= Past = Present x Future Over Yesterday =

- Barry episode
- Episode no.: Season 2 Episode 3
- Directed by: Minkie Spiro
- Written by: Jason Kim
- Cinematography by: Paula Huidobro
- Editing by: Jeff Buchanan
- Original air date: April 14, 2019
- Running time: 27 minutes

Guest appearances
- John Pirruccello as Detective John Loach; Darrell Britt-Gibson as Jermaine Jefrint; D'Arcy Carden as Natalie Greer; Andy Carey as Eric; Rightor Doyle as Nick Nicholby; Alejandro Furth as Antonio Manuel; Kirby Howell-Baptiste as Sasha Baxter; Michael Irby as Cristobal Sifuentes; Andrew Leeds as Leo Cousineau; Patricia Fa'asua as Esther; Joe Massingill as Sam; Alexa Havins as Kate; James Hiroyuki Liao as Albert Nguyen; Sam Ingraffia as Thomas Friedman; Nikita Bogolyubov as Mayrbek; Troy Caylak as Akhmal; Nick Gracer as Yandar

Episode chronology
← Previous "The Power of No"	Next → "What?!"

"Past = Present x Future Over Yesterday" is the third episode of the second season of the American crime tragicomedy television series Barry. It is the 11th overall episode of the series and was written by producer Jason Kim, and directed by Minkie Spiro. It was first broadcast on HBO in the United States on April 14, 2019.

The series follows Barry Berkman, a hitman from Cleveland who travels to Los Angeles to kill someone but finds himself joining an acting class taught by Gene Cousineau, where he meets aspiring actress Sally Reed and begins to question his path in life as he deals with his criminal associates such as Monroe Fuches and NoHo Hank. In the episode, Barry struggles to write a monologue that details his war experience, while Sally also struggles with telling her story about her abusive relationship with her ex-husband. Meanwhile, Hank is negatively affected by Esther's failed assassination attempt and decides he must kill Barry.

According to Nielsen Media Research, the episode was seen by an estimated 1.78 million household viewers and gained a 0.7 ratings share among adults aged 18–49. The episode received positive reviews, with critics praising the performances (particularly Hader and Carrigan), and subject matter although the lack of plot progress was criticized. For his performance in the episode, Anthony Carrigan received an Outstanding Supporting Actor in a Comedy Series nomination at the 71st Primetime Emmy Awards.

== Plot ==
After having a dream where he debates with Thomas Friedman (Sam Ingraffia), Hank (Anthony Carrigan) is woken up and is surprised to see Esther (Patricia Fa'assua) alive. Cristobal (Michael Irby) allows Esther and some of her gang to move into the stash house and sends Hank and his men out to live in a storage unit. Hank concludes he must kill Barry (Bill Hader).

In his apartment, Barry is preparing for a monologue about his war experiences in Korangal Valley. He decides to focus on the first time he saved a life, but the events prove to be even more traumatic, as it involved his partner Albert (James Hiroyuki Liao) being gravely wounded. Sally (Sarah Goldberg) is using the night she left her abusive ex-husband as a monologue, but while investigating the events, she struggles with the fact that she never actually stood up to him. Some gunshots miss Barry as he is writing, who injures the sniper, and confronts Hank. Barry lets him live and offers to train Hank's men to kill the Burmese to settle their debt, which Hank gleefully accepts. Meanwhile, Gene (Henry Winkler) once again tries to reconnect with his son, Leo (Andrew Leeds), by giving him his lake house, but Leo refuses it, citing Moss's disappearance there.

Barry's first day as an instructor to the Chechens proves difficult, with most of them failing to hit a single bottle. Fuches (Stephen Root) is pressured by Loach (John Pirruccello) to get more evidence against Barry. He decides to visit Barry at his Lululemon job, and this time, Barry actually welcomes him. Barry wants to talk about his war experience but Fuches advises him against it, warning him that his class would be against him if he details everything that happened, and the two have an emotional re-connection while an increasingly frustrated Loach looks on.

At the acting class, Barry starts his monologue but Gene quickly deduces that he plagiarized Braveheart in his monologue. He then has Barry act as Sally's abusive ex-husband for her monologue, stating she feels more comfortable with him. The monologue asks Barry to choke Sally and, despite Sally telling him to do it, Barry can't bring himself to perform the action. Sally then provokes him, even attacking him, prompting an angry Barry to storm out. As Sally and Barry talk outside, Sally is shocked to see her ex-husband, Sam (Joe Massingill), show up.

== Production ==
=== Development ===
In March 2019, the episode's title was revealed as "Past = Present x Future Over Yesterday" and it was announced that producer Jason Kim had written the episode while Minkie Spiro had directed it. This was Kim's first writing credit, and Spiro's first directing credit.

=== Writing ===
Bill Hader wanted the episode to properly portray Barry's view of the war, "It starts with the idea of how we lie to ourselves and how we can tell some of our truths but not all of our truths. You tell partial truths, and so it'd be funny to illustrate that instead of, you know, just watching Barry type stuff and say it. You want to actually dramatize it." The crew also decided to include the speech from Braveheart, deeming Barry as a person who watched few films and thought no one ever watched the film itself.

Sally's abusive ex-husband was teased on the first season, with the writers wondering if they really needed to bring him into focus. After a writer suggesting to do so and to keep in theme with the idea that Barry had to stop being "violent", the writers decided to introduce him in the episode.

During the scene where Barry confronts NoHo Hank (Anthony Carrigan) and Akhmal (Troy Caylak) on the rooftop, Noho Hank was scripted to simply refer to his men as "shit", with Akhmal retorting that if he was "shit" then NoHo Hank is "King of Shit Mountain". However, during one of the takes Carrigan replaced the insult with "suck balls", to which Caylak accordingly adjusted Akhmal's line, resulting in Akhmal referring to NoHo Hank as "King of Suck Balls Mountain", which caused the entire cast and crew to break down laughing. The improvised moment made it into the final episode. The ad-lib has since become a fan favorite, with a cut of Caylak's line appearing in the season 3 opening recap in an apparent homage to its popularity.

== Reception ==
=== Viewers ===
The episode was watched by 1.78 million viewers, earning a 0.7 in the 18-49 rating demographics on the Nielson ratings scale. This means that 0.7 percent of all households with televisions watched the episode. This was a massive 319% increase from the previous episode, which was watched by 0.424 million viewers with a 0.2 in the 18-49 demographics.

=== Critical reviews ===
"Past = Present x Future Over Yesterday" received positive reviews. Vikram Murthi of The A.V. Club gave the episode a "B−" and wrote, "'Past = Present x Future Over Yesterday' is an okay episode that spends too much of its runtime table setting and spinning its wheel without enough compensatory laughs. Barry and Hank quickly bury their would-be feud when Barry agrees to train the Chechens to be assassins. Fuches and Loach continue to conspire to get Barry to admit he killed Moss on tape. Barry and Sally struggle with their personal pieces. Gene tries again to reconcile with his estranged son, who still has little interest in any meaningful relationship with him. It's not that these are unimportant developments, but you can also definitely feel Barry stalling just long enough to ramp up the tension."

Nick Harley of Den of Geek wrote, "'Past Equals Present x Future Over Yesterday' continues Barry's soul-searching in intense fashion, cutting the heaviness with healthy doses of humor. It's clear now that the blank-slate that we saw in Season 1 was just a coping mechanism for Barry and that he's got some serious PTSD and identity issues to sort through."

=== Accolades ===
TVLine named Bill Hader as the "Performer of the Week" for the week of April 20, 2019, for his performance in the episode. The site wrote, "As the talented hitman/not-so-talented actor at the center of HBO's pitch-black comedy, Hader delivers an exquisitely subtle brand of acting that's remarkable for how little it looks like acting. Barry is a tightly wound coil of suppressed emotion, never revealing the trauma he's endured in his years as a hired killer, so it often looks like Hader is underplaying it. But this week, he let a tiny bit of that emotion peek out in a restrained yet riveting turn."

Anthony Carrigan submitted this episode into consideration for his Outstanding Supporting Actor in a Comedy Series nomination at the 71st Primetime Emmy Awards.
