= Chapter Six: Listen With Your Ears, React With Your Face =

- Barry episode
- Episode no.: Season 1 Episode 6
- Directed by: Hiro Murai
- Written by: Emily Heller
- Cinematography by: Paula Huidobro
- Editing by: Kyle Reiter
- Original air date: April 29, 2018
- Running time: 29 minutes

Guest appearances
- Paula Newsome as Detective Janice Moss; Chris Marquette as Chris Lucado; John Pirruccello as Detective John Loach; Darrell Britt-Gibson as Jermaine Jefrint; Andy Carey as Eric; Rightor Doyle as Nick Nicholby; Alejandro Furth as Antonio Manuel; Kirby Howell-Baptiste as Sasha Baxter; Mark Ivanir as Vacha; Dale Pavinski as Taylor Garrett

Episode chronology
← Previous "Chapter Five: Do Your Job"	Next → "Chapter Seven: Loud, Fast, and Keep Going"

"Chapter Six: Listen With Your Ears, React With Your Face" is the sixth episode of the first season of the American crime tragicomedy television series Barry. The episode was written by producer Emily Heller, and directed by Hiro Murai. It was first broadcast on HBO in the United States on April 29, 2018.

The series follows Barry Berkman, a hitman from Cleveland who travels to Los Angeles to kill someone but joins an acting class taught by Gene Cousineau, where he meets Reed and questions his life path as he deals with associates such as Fuches and NoHo Hank. In the episode, Barry must face the consequences of sparing Taylor's life and Fuches' pressure to kill him. Meanwhile, the police close in on him, and a henchman seeks revenge.

According to Nielsen Media Research, the episode was seen by an estimated 0.560 million household viewers and gained a 0.2 ratings share among adults aged 18–49. The episode received critical acclaim, with critics praising the writing, directing, performances, tension and cliffhanger.

== Plot ==
Barry (Bill Hader), Fuches (Stephen Root), and Taylor (Dale Pavinski) are surveying a desert airstrip where they plan to intercept Bolivian drug lord Cristobal Sifuentes's upon arrival. Fuches tells Barry it was a mistake to let Taylor live.

The morning after having sex, Moss (Paula Newsome) tells Gene (Henry Winkler) that they must end their relationship, as she feels it will interfere with her investigation. Meanwhile, Goran (Glenn Fleshler) and Hank (Anthony Carrigan) inspect the stash house and praise Barry's actions. Pazar's henchman Vacha (Mark Ivanir), tells Goran about Sally (Sarah Goldberg), but Goran tells him to drop his vendetta.

Barry hangs out with Taylor at his apartment and suggests that Taylor could work for Fuches while he quits his hitman life. Taylor refuses and tells Barry he should be getting more money and should kill Fuches. Barry refuses to take unlaundered money from the raid, but Taylor secretly places the money in his backpack.

At the acting class, Barry and the class mutually apologize over their previous argument. Barry finds the money in his backpack and hurriedly hides it in the bathroom. He then performs a Macbeth scene with Sally, which is going poorly. After the class ends, Barry calls Taylor and tells him that he will do the airstrip job by himself, which Taylor seemingly accepts. Meanwhile, Moss starts thinking about her relationship with Gene and decides to drop the case.

That night, Sally persuades Gene to let her play Macbeth instead. Vacha sneaks into the building to find Sally, but runs into Moss, who was visiting Gene to rekindle their relationship. Vacha flees after Moss notes his Russian accent and is killed in a shootout. Moss tells Gene to leave the active crime scene and police discover the hidden money in the bathroom.

The next day, Barry bumps into Taylor and is shocked to see that he has brought in Chris (Chris Marquette) and Vaughn (Marcus Brown) to help them in the airstrip attack, having felt inspired by Gene's acting book that Taylor had removed earlier from Barry's bag. A panicked Barry tries to get Chris out of the vehicle as he is unaware of the attack, but Chris chooses to stay. Taylor ignores Barry's warnings to follow the safer route and drives straight toward the Bolivians, who have already arrived. As they approach, Taylor and Vaughn are shot and the car starts to crash.

== Production ==
=== Development ===
In February 2018, the episode's title was revealed as "Chapter Six: Listen With Your Ears, React With Your Face" and it was announced that producer Emily Heller had written the episode while Hiro Murai had directed it. This was Heller's first writing credit, and Murai's second directing credit.

== Reception ==
=== Viewers ===
The episode was watched by 0.560 million viewers, earning a 0.2 in the 18-49 rating demographics on the Nielson ratings scale. This means that 0.2 percent of all households with televisions watched the episode. This was a 13% decrease from the previous episode, which was watched by 0.643 million viewers with a 0.2 in the 18-49 demographics.

=== Critical reviews ===
"Chapter Six: Listen With Your Ears, React With Your Face" received critical acclaim. Vikram Murthi of The A.V. Club gave the episode an "A" and wrote, "'Chapter 6: Listen With Your Ears, React With Your Face' is the everything-begins-to-unravel episode of the season, in which the walls start to slowly close in on our hero. Yet, Barry makes some interesting choices for such a now-standard episode of TV. For one thing, the show takes its sweet time before it lets the proverbial shit hit the fan. Most of the episode follows Barry tip-toeing around Taylor or acting class drama, but by the end of the episode, the LAPD are closer to Barry than ever, and Taylor takes control of Barry's mission. Credited writer Emily Heller lulls the audience into a false sense of security before letting the action take over."

Nick Harley of Den of Geek wrote, "Once again, Barry moves toward darker material and gives us a cliffhanger that has me resisting immediately firing up the next episode. I have to assume Barry will get out of this situation unscathed, but how will potentially losing his friend Chris affect him? Will the rage then send him after Fuches? Will the Bolivian connection finally put him in Moss’ crosshairs? The fact that a half-hour series that was pitched as a comedy has me asking all of these questions proves we're dealing with something truly unique and special here." Charles Bramesco of Vulture gave the episode a 4 star rating out of 5 and wrote, "For all its absurd humor and Jarmuschian flights of stagnant ennui, Barry remains at its heart a morality play about the immorality of people who put on plays. Barry now has a few innocent lives on his hands, most troublingly the friend with a wife and kid who thought they were all going into the desert to do a little light intimidation."
