= Chapter Five: Do Your Job =

- Barry episode
- Episode no.: Season 1 Episode 5
- Directed by: Hiro Murai
- Written by: Ben Smith
- Cinematography by: Paula Huidobro
- Editing by: Jeff Buchanan
- Original air date: April 22, 2018
- Running time: 29 minutes

Guest appearances
- Paula Newsome as Detective Janice Moss; Chris Marquette as Chris Lucado; John Pirruccello as Detective John Loach; Darrell Britt-Gibson as Jermaine Jefrint; D'Arcy Carden as Natalie Greer; Andy Carey as Eric; Karen David as Sharon Lucado; Rightor Doyle as Nick Nicholby; Alejandro Furth as Antonio Manuel; Kirby Howell-Baptiste as Sasha Baxter; Dale Pavinski as Taylor Garrett

Episode chronology
← Previous "Chapter Four: Commit... to YOU"	Next → "Chapter Six: Listen With Your Ears, React With Your Face"

"Chapter Five: Do Your Job" is the fifth episode of the first season of the American crime tragicomedy television series Barry. The episode was written by co-producer Ben Smith, and directed by Hiro Murai. It was first broadcast on HBO in the United States on April 22, 2018.

The series follows Barry Berkman, a hitman from Cleveland who travels to Los Angeles to kill someone but finds himself joining an acting class taught by Gene Cousineau, where he meets aspiring actress Sally Reed and begins to question his path in life as he deals with his criminal associates such as Monroe Fuches and NoHo Hank. In the episode, Barry is preparing to take part in the stash house raid with Taylor, but is instructed by Fuches to kill Taylor after the mission is done to avoid any potential danger to their interests.

According to Nielsen Media Research, the episode was seen by an estimated 0.643 million household viewers and gained a 0.2 ratings share among adults aged 18–49. The episode received critical acclaim, with critics praising the performances, humor, Murai's directing and action sequences.

== Plot ==
Taylor (Dale Pavinski) constantly sends messages to Barry (Bill Hader), who is spending the day at a carnival with Chris (Chris Marquette) and his family. He daydreams about a life with Sally (Sarah Goldberg) and their child.

Barry goes to acting class, where Sally tells him they need to take some time off from their relationship. The class is preparing a Macbeth performance in a Shakespeare showcase, and they are surprised to see that they are scene partners. Moss (Paula Newsome) returns to the class, questioning the students about the silhouetted figure seen from the lipstick camera, although no one is able to recognize it, relieving Barry. However, he is questioned by Moss due to his height and talks about his military background. Barry evades suspicion by providing a pre-arranged alibi that is "verified" by Fuches (Stephen Root).

After being allowed to go, Barry meets with Fuches, Goran (Glenn Fleshler) and Hank (Anthony Carrigan) to discuss the plans for the raid, with Fuches instructing Barry to kill Taylor once they finish, as he knows too much, despite his misgivings over killing a fellow former Marine.

At the acting class, the students debate about the morality and actions of Lord Macbeth and Lady Macbeth, with Barry taking an opposite position to the class by stating the fault is with Lady Macbeth and not Lord Macbeth, eventually lashing out with the class as he has killed people. The class assumes he means his military background, with Gene (Henry Winkler) having some say "thank you for your service" to Barry. Distraught, Barry storms out. At a bar, the students lament their treatment of Barry. When Sally tries deflect blame from themselves, Natalie (D'Arcy Carden) criticizes her for leaving her party with Zach. Moss struggles with the case and visits Gene at his house where they passionately kiss.

Barry and Taylor then start the raid at the stash house, killing many Bolivians. At one point, Barry is knocked out. When he wakes up, he sees that Taylor killed everyone and saved his life. Taylor then starts taking some of the money from the Bolivians, while Barry prepares to shoot him while his back is turned. The next morning, Barry meets with Fuches at a restaurant, who is happy to see that he survived. Fuches starts calming him when he thinks he killed Taylor, when suddenly Taylor joins them, Barry having not followed his order.

== Production ==
=== Development ===
In February 2018, the episode's title was revealed as "Chapter Five: Do Your Job" and it was announced that co-producer Ben Smith had written the episode while Hiro Murai had directed it. This was Smith's first writing credit, and Murai's first directing credit.

== Reception ==
=== Viewers ===
The episode was watched by 0.643 million viewers, earning a 0.2 in the 18-49 rating demographics on the Nielsen ratings scale. This means that 0.2 percent of all households with televisions watched the episode. This was a 25% increase from the previous episode, which was watched by 0.511 million viewers with a 0.2 in the 18-49 demographics.

=== Critical reviews ===
"Chapter Five: Do Your Job" received critical acclaim. Vikram Murthi of The A.V. Club gave the episode an "A−" and wrote, "In its debut season, Barry has somewhat suffered from a lack of focus. Hader and Berg have introduced so many elements that are great on their own but the show hasn't always been successful maneuvering between them. Events don't flow into each other as much as they just occur sequentially. But 'Chapter Five: Do Your Job' is the best episode of the season precisely because it hones in on Barry's own plight, and almost every scene orbits that conflict. He can't escape the past, but he needs to let it go before moving into the future. Where does he begin?"

Nick Harley of Den of Geek wrote, "Five episodes in, Barry is evolving into something darker and more complex than what viewers originally envisioned when they heard the pitch for Bill Hader's series. Humor and heavy morality haven't been mixed this deftly since Breaking Bad's first season, and it will be interesting to see how cloudy the waters get in the rest of this season's back half." Charles Bramesco of Vulture gave the episode a 4 star rating out of 5 and wrote, "The annals of screen entertainment are littered with accessories in denial. 'Chapter Five: Do Your Job' places Barry in a narrative lineage stretching from Rick Blaine all the way to Baby the driver, men adjacent to reprehensible behavior who can nonetheless convince themselves of their own innocence. They're masters of rationalization, establishing a code or sticking to a principle that exonerates them from culpability in their own mind."

=== Accolades ===
TVLine named Bill Hader as the "Performer of the Week" for the week of April 28, 2018, for his performance in the episode. The site wrote, "He exploded with rage, and Hader, for the first time, showed us the churning waters of self-loathing underneath Barry's placid surface. Barry also executed an elaborate kill mission later in the episode, and Hader was convincingly adept handling a high-powered rifle. But that scene in the acting class is what's sticking with us. We know Hader can deliver the laughs, but this week, he hit new dramatic heights, too."
