= What?! =

- Barry episode
- Episode no.: Season 2 Episode 4
- Directed by: Liza Johnson
- Written by: Duffy Boudreau
- Cinematography by: Paula Huidobro
- Editing by: Kyle Reiter
- Original air date: April 21, 2019
- Running time: 30 minutes

Guest appearances
- John Pirruccello as Detective John Loach; Darrell Britt-Gibson as Jermaine Jefrint; D'Arcy Carden as Natalie Greer; Andy Carey as Eric; Rightor Doyle as Nick Nicholby; Alejandro Furth as Antonio Manuel; Kirby Howell-Baptiste as Sasha Baxter; Andrew Leeds as Leo Cousineau; Joe Massingill as Sam; Daniel Bernhardt as Ronny Proxin; Nikita Bogolyubov as Mayrbek; Troy Caylak as Akhmal; Nick Gracer as Yandar

Episode chronology
← Previous "Past = Present x Future Over Yesterday"	Next → "ronny/lily"

"What?!" is the fourth episode of the second season of the American crime tragicomedy television series Barry. It is the 12th overall episode of the series and was written by co-producer Duffy Boudreau, and directed by Liza Johnson. It was first broadcast on HBO in the United States on April 21, 2019.

The series follows Barry Berkman, a hitman from Cleveland who travels to Los Angeles to kill someone but finds himself joining an acting class taught by Gene Cousineau, where he meets aspiring actress Sally Reed and begins to question his path in life as he deals with his criminal associates such as Monroe Fuches and NoHo Hank. In the episode, Barry decides to take matters on his own hands when Sally's abusive ex-husband reappears in her life, while Sally has to confront herself on never standing up to her ex-husband. Meanwhile, Fuches is pressured by Loach to get a confession from Barry, but he works in order to evade Barry confessing.

According to Nielsen Media Research, the episode was seen by an estimated 1.94 million household viewers and gained a 0.8 ratings share among adults aged 18–49. The episode received critical acclaim, with critics praising the performances (particularly Hader, Goldberg and Winkler), writing and ending. For his performance in the episode, Henry Winkler received an Outstanding Supporting Actor in a Comedy Series nomination at the 71st Primetime Emmy Awards.

== Plot ==
Barry (Bill Hader) and Sally (Sarah Goldberg) have dinner with Sally's ex-husband, Sam (Joe Massingill), who stopped enroute to San Diego. Sally tries to dissuade him from looking into her play which is based on their abusive marriage, while Barry is inwardly angry at Sam. Later, while training with Hank (Anthony Carrigan), he unleashes his anger towards Mayrbek (Nikita Bogolyubov), a young, carefree henchman.

At the acting class, Sally admits to Barry that she had not actually stood up to Sam when leaving and that she is distraught about potentially telling the truth onstage. Barry assures her that it's sometimes okay to keep secrets. Meanwhile, Loach (John Pirruccello) bugs a hotel room and orders Fuches (Stephen Root) to bring Barry there to confess to Moss's murder. Fuches calls Barry, convincing him to visit to discuss his past.

While Barry watches Sally rehearse at the class, he notices Sam watching and confronts him outside. Sam says he wanted to hear Sally's version of the story and insults them before driving away. Sally is invited by Sam to his hotel to receive a gift, which she hesitantly agrees to do. Barry, meanwhile, takes a pistol to confront Sam himself.

Sam is initially friendly but becomes threatening when Sally states she will still do the performance. Sally leaves with Barry almost shooting her, although he manages to hide. Barry leaves and misses his hotel meeting with Fuches. This frustrates Loach and gives Fuches a window to secretly call Barry and tell him to avoid all contact with him.

Needing support, Barry visits Gene (Henry Winkler), promising to not look at him differently if he tells the truth. Barry then opens up about the experience in the Korangal Valley: after Albert was shot, he killed an innocent civilian he mistakenly thought was responsible and was subsequently discharged from the Marines. Gene tells Barry never to share the story, but accepts and comforts him. Gene tells him about his own failed relationship with his son Leo (Andrew Leeds) and that everyone can change for the better.

Barry visits Fuches just as he is trying to escape from the hotel room. Despite Fuches's attempts to prevent Barry from saying anything, Barry confesses to killing Moss. Loach then enters, shows Barry the recording device, and offers him a deal: if he kills his ex-wife's lover, Ronny (Daniel Bernhardt), he will let him go. Shocked, Barry says the episode's title line.

== Production ==
=== Development ===
In April 2019, the episode's title was revealed as "What?!" and it was announced that co-producer Duffy Boudreau had written the episode while Liza Johnson had directed it. This was Boudreau's second writing credit, and Johnson's first directing credit.

=== Writing ===
Sally's abusive past was discussed by Bill Hader, who talked with some relatives who were survivors of domestic abuse. The writers talked with many women on the subject, with Hader saying "everyone had different experiences or different ideas, but the consensus was that this was pretty honest."

As writing on the season started, Hader thought "it would be great if Loach at one point needed Barry to kill his ex-wife's boyfriend." The writers would then work on the plotline, stating that it was vital that the episode would need to be in the middle of the season, "Right in here we should find that out, so let's build to that."

It was important for the writers to address the scene where Barry confessed to killing an innocent man to Gene. As the writers originally did not plan to add Gene's son until a few episodes later, the line "I have a son" was supposed to be used as a surprise element.

== Reception ==
=== Viewers ===
The episode was watched by 1.94 million viewers, earning a 0.8 in the 18-49 rating demographics on the Nielson ratings scale. This means that 0.8 percent of all households with televisions watched the episode. This was a 8% increase from the previous episode, which was watched by 1.78 million viewers with a 0.7 in the 18-49 demographics.

=== Critical reviews ===
"What?!" received critical acclaim. Vikram Murthi of The A.V. Club gave the episode an "A−" and wrote, "Barry keeps receiving second chances from the universe, but they only take the form of moral traps. Train Hank's army and then he can walk away. Kill Ronnie Proxin and the Moss situation goes away. Live a lie only if it's convenient. Tell the truth, but not the whole truth. Over time, 'Starting... now!' has become less of a promise and more of a threat."

Nick Harley of Den of Geek wrote, "It doesn't matter if the laughs are few and far between, Barry has made us care about these characters and their personal journeys and is finally starting to show Barry, Sally, and Gene grow and evolve. Obviously being blackmailed to kill will likely be a setback for Barry, but we'll feel the frustration of that situation more deeply now that we've seen him make serious strides to better himself." Carissa Pavlica of TV Fanatic gave the episode a 4.75 star rating out of 5 and wrote, "They say timing is everything. Whether Barry's timing is good or terrible during 'What?!' depends on how you look at it. Barry's journey is significantly changed when he meets Sally's Ex, Sam. But another sharp turn reveals itself that could throw a wrench in his plans again."

=== Accolades ===
Henry Winkler submitted this episode into consideration for his Outstanding Supporting Actor in a Comedy Series nomination at the 71st Primetime Emmy Awards.
