= Chapter Eight: Know Your Truth =

- Barry episode
- Episode no.: Season 1 Episode 8
- Directed by: Alec Berg
- Written by: Alec Berg & Bill Hader
- Cinematography by: Paula Huidobro
- Editing by: Kyle Reiter
- Original air date: May 13, 2018
- Running time: 32 minutes

Guest appearances
- Paula Newsome as Detective Janice Moss; John Pirruccello as Detective John Loach; Darrell Britt-Gibson as Jermaine Jefrint; D'Arcy Carden as Natalie Greer; Andy Carey as Eric; Rightor Doyle as Nick Nicholby; Alejandro Furth as Antonio Manuel; Kirby Howell-Baptiste as Sasha Baxter; Michael Irby as Cristobal Sifuentes; Mark Ivanir as Ruslan; Gary Kraus as Chief Krauss

Episode chronology
← Previous "Chapter Seven: Loud, Fast, and Keep Going"	Next → "The Show Must Go On, Probably?"

"Chapter Eight: Know Your Truth" is the eighth episode and season finale of the first season of the American crime tragicomedy television series Barry. The episode was written by series creators Alec Berg and Bill Hader, and directed by Berg. It was first broadcast on HBO in the United States on May 13, 2018.

The series follows Barry Berkman, a hitman from Cleveland who travels to Los Angeles to kill someone but finds himself joining an acting class taught by Gene Cousineau, where he meets aspiring actress Sally Reed and begins to question his path in life as he deals with his criminal associates such as Monroe Fuches and NoHo Hank. In the episode, Barry wants to leave his criminal life behind but has to interfere when Fuches' life is in danger, while the police are closing in on him.

According to Nielsen Media Research, the episode was seen by an estimated 0.548 million household viewers and gained a 0.2 ratings share among adults aged 18–49. The episode received critical acclaim, with critics praising the writing, directing, performances, character development, suspense and ending. However, some critics questioned if the decision to continue the series would be effective.

== Plot ==
Barry (Bill Hader) visits Fuches (Stephen Root) at his hotel room, and punches his initially delighted mentor. Barry takes his share of the money and leaves saying that he is done with his criminal life.

Angry, Fuches goes to Goran (Glenn Fleshler) and offers a partnership to kill him. However, Goran instead brings Vacha's twin, Ruslan (Mark Ivanir) to kill Fuches while he goes to kill Barry. Hank (Anthony Carrigan) calls Barry to tell him about Goran, telling him to leave town. Meanwhile, Moss (Paula Newsome) and her LAPD colleagues get a warrant for Goran.

Failing to find Barry, Goran returns to see that Ruslan wasted time building a pillory and decides to kill Fuches himself. Before he can do so, Barry kills him and his henchmen and frees Fuches. Barry takes Fuches to Hollywood Burbank Airport, gives him all the money and tells him to leave the city, as he is done with his criminal life. Meanwhile, Hank and the remaining henchmen discover Goran's corpse before the authorities arrive. They flee and are welcomed into Cristobal's (Michael Irby) Bolivian gang. Police blame recent events on Taylor and Ryan Madison having conspired to get the Chechens and the Bolivians to fight each other and close the case.

Barry tells Sally (Sarah Goldberg) that he plans to quit the class, but she convinces him to stay and to act alongside her in an adaptation of The Front Page. A few weeks later, Barry and Sally are now in a relationship and are staying with Gene (Henry Winkler) and Moss at Gene's lake house. Moss notes that Barry is now using the "Barry Block" stage name. During dinner, Gene recalls the time Barry approached his car and gave a "monologue" about killing people, which arouses Moss's suspicions, worrying Barry.

That night, Moss sneaks out and uses her laptop to find Barry's Facebook profile, which links him to Chris and Taylor. Moss concludes that Barry is the silhouetted man from the lipstick camera. Barry approaches her, explaining he is not proud of his actions, that he tried to leave it behind, and begs her not to pursue the matter. Moss repeatedly rebuffs him and forces him to walk toward the house, prompting Barry to approach a tree that holds a silenced pistol. Shots are fired, Barry returns to his room with a sleeping Sally, and he once again tells himself that his criminal life is over "starting now".

== Production ==
=== Development ===
In February 2018, the episode's title was revealed as "Chapter Eight: Know Your Truth" and it was announced that series creators Alec Berg and Bill Hader had written the episode while Berg had directed it. This was Berg's third writing credit, Hader's third writing credit, and Berg's second directing credit.

=== Writing ===
The time jump at the second half of the episode was done in an attempt to trick the viewers into thinking it was another fantasy of Barry, a recurring gag throughout the season. The original ending included a different version. In the original version, Barry bought a house at a midpoint of the series, and Moss would discover crucial evidence when she visited his bathroom. The writers scrapped the plan as Hader deemed it "too pat". Alec Berg then suggested setting the final moments at Gene's lake house.

Regarding Barry's decision to kill Moss, Berg said "At the beginning of the season, he's not fulfilled and he's leading a life of quiet desperation, but he's also not exposing himself to the emotional ramifications of anything he's done, and that has its advantages. So trying to run to the light the way he is, it exposes him to have to emotionally dissect everything that he's done in his life. And it makes his life a hell of a lot harder, not easier." The writers also worked on ways to avoid killing Goran Pazar, but Hader said "every way we looked at it, and we did for days, it just all came back to Barry cannot move on if Goran is alive."

== Reception ==
=== Viewers ===
The episode was watched by 0.548 million viewers, earning a 0.2 in the 18-49 rating demographics on the Nielsen ratings scale. This means that 0.2 percent of all households with televisions watched the episode. This was a 14% decrease from the previous episode, which was watched by 0.636 million viewers with a 0.2 in the 18-49 demographics.

=== Critical reviews ===
"Chapter Eight: Know Your Truth" received critical acclaim. Vikram Murthi of The A.V. Club gave the episode an "A−" and wrote, "The hitman path will only bring further pain and acting seemingly requires him to rely on that pain. It's a no-win situation for ol' Barry, a man who just wants to escape but is ill-equipped to do so. But then, about halfway through 'Chapter Eight', something improbable happens. The world conspires to give Barry the fresh start he so desires. A series of betrayals and misunderstandings provide him an out that he never saw coming. In the world of Barry, this counts as something close to a miracle."

Alan Sepinwall of Uproxx wrote, "this season kept surprising me in so many ways, and particularly in how the writing and Hader's performance didn't flinch from the tragedy Barry brings into the world. So I will hope they have a specific — and hopefully short-term — plan for where the story goes next, and will look forward to seeing what that is next year." Emily VanDerWerff of Vox wrote, "I almost wish the last moments of 'Know Your Truth' were the last moments of the show, period. We know Barry well enough now to be aware of how blinded he is from who he is, how little he actually knows his truth. 'Starting now—' is a promise he'll never keep to himself. Do we really need to see that unfold, season after season? Or can we just know that failure is inevitable?"

Nick Harley of Den of Geek gave the episode a perfect 5 star rating out of 5 and wrote, "With such a quiet, powerful ending, 'Chapter Eight: Know Your Truth' had me lingering in my seat long after the credits rolled completely stunned by the excellence of Barry's first season. Deeply human, funny, and surprising, Barry is more ambitious and surehanded than any comedy in the last ten years, barring only The Good Place and Bojack Horseman." Charles Bramesco of Vulture gave the episode a perfect 5 star rating out of 5 and wrote, "Barry isn't the story of a criminal struggling to join the light side, or even the story of a fundamentally all right yet passive guy learning to assert himself. It's the story of a lonesome man building a richer existence by filling his life with connections and passions and desires. It's the story of a withdrawn cipher growing into an actor by the basest dictionary definition: one who does."

Emily Yahr of The Washington Post wrote, "Terrific Barry shows how HBO's best dramas are often found in its comedies." Miles Surrey of The Ringer wrote, "The season finale of Barry pushes its hitman-turned-actor protagonist into a corner, and shines a light on the performative nature of being human."
