= The Power of No =

- Barry episode
- Episode no.: Season 2 Episode 2
- Directed by: Hiro Murai
- Written by: Taofik Kolade
- Cinematography by: Paula Huidobro
- Editing by: Kyle Reiter
- Original air date: April 7, 2019
- Running time: 29 minutes

Guest appearances
- John Pirruccello as Detective John Loach; Sarah Burns as Detective Mae Dunn; Darrell Britt-Gibson as Jermaine Jefrint; D'Arcy Carden as Natalie Greer; Andy Carey as Eric; Rightor Doyle as Nick Nicholby; Alejandro Furth as Antonio Manuel; Kirby Howell-Baptiste as Sasha Baxter; Michael Irby as Cristobal Sifuentes; Andrew Leeds as Leo Cousineau; Patricia Fa'asua as Esther; Jessy Hodges as Lindsay Mandel; Chris McGarry as Michael Cohen; Rodney To as Mike; Michael Beach as Police Detective; Patrick Fabian as Space Dad

Episode chronology
← Previous "The Show Must Go On, Probably?"	Next → "Past = Present x Future Over Yesterday"

"The Power of No" is the second episode of the second season of the American crime tragicomedy television series Barry. It is the 10th overall episode of the series and was written by Taofik Kolade, and directed by Hiro Murai. It was first broadcast on HBO in the United States on April 7, 2019.

The series follows Barry Berkman, a hitman from Cleveland who travels to Los Angeles to kill someone but finds himself joining an acting class taught by Gene Cousineau, where he meets aspiring actress Sally Reed and begins to question his path in life as he deals with his criminal associates such as Monroe Fuches and NoHo Hank. In the episode, Barry is forced to participate in a hit for NoHo Hank and is also pressured by Gene to use his war speech for a performance. Meanwhile, Loach decides to visit Fuches to get a possible confession from him and to help him get Barry.

According to Nielsen Media Research, the episode was seen by an estimated 0.424 million household viewers and gained a 0.2 ratings share among adults aged 18–49. The episode received positive reviews, with critics praising the performances, character development and Murai's directing.

== Plot ==
Barry (Bill Hader) and Hank (Anthony Carrigan) meet in a car, with Hank instructing Barry to kill Esther (Patricia Fa'asua), and revealing her connections to Cristobal (Michael Irby). Barry is hesitant on doing the job, as he wanted to leave his criminal life behind, but Hank's threat leaves him with no choice.

Barry arrives at class, seeing that the students are now trying to up the stakes on his performance and perform their biggest personal tragedies. Gene (Henry Winkler) announces his intentions of a performance where the students play a short piece that perfectly encapsulates their own personal truth. Barry visits Gene, asking to use a different story as he does not want his truth to represent death. Gene only accepts when Barry wants to use the day they first met. Meanwhile, Sally (Sarah Goldberg) now works with new agents, which has given her more success. However, her roles are mostly small or insignificant, upsetting her. Her sole female agent, Lindsay (Jessy Hodges), sympathizes and urges her to bide her time until the perfect role comes along.

Loach (John Pirruccello) goes to Cleveland and visits Fuches (Stephen Root), revealing he knows about his tooth and questions him about Barry. Fuches denies knowing him, but Loach, still grief-stricken about Moss, threatens to send him to prison for cooperating with Barry. Meanwhile, Gene decides to talk with his estranged son, an organic farmer named Leo. Leo is not interested in reconnecting with his father, as Gene is more interested in speaking about himself and blaming anyone but himself. The meeting prompts Gene to tell Barry that he will have to do the Afghanistan story, as he feels having Barry recreate the scene would be too self-absorbed to Gene. While rehearsing, Sally uses a story to detail her attempts to move on from her abusive ex-husband.

That night, Barry sneaks into Esther's monastery to kill her. However, he is haunted by his actions in the War in Afghanistan and is unable to kill her. He decides to leave, accidentally entering a room with members of the Burmese mob. Barry crashes his car after being shot by the Burmese mob. A wounded Barry escapes to his apartment. Fuches is waiting for him and says he wants to reconcile, but Barry rebuffs him. Fuches then communicates with Loach, who is surveilling from a van, telling him he will eventually get him to confess.

== Production ==
=== Development ===
In March 2019, the episode's title was revealed as "The Power of No" and it was announced that Taofik Kolade had written the episode while Hiro Murai had directed it. This was Kolade's first writing credit, and Murai's fourth directing credit.

=== Writing ===
As the writers already had elements in motion for the season premiere, Bill Hader wanted to expand on the idea of Fuches working with Loach. The writers had the reveal as the ending of the episode and wrote backwards from that point. The scene was rewritten after a rehearsal when the writers deemed that the scene "wasn't working".

Originally, Gene Cousineau would have an ex-wife but the writers scrapped it when they felt the storyline wasn't working. Hader then came up with the concept of Gene's son, saying "it is about Barry being stuck between these two fathers. What if Gene's thing was that it was a son?"

=== Filming ===
Hader wanted the scene set at the monastery, as he wanted a "very quiet, eerie, holy-type place." Initially, the scene would include music. During post-production, the crew decided to see the scene without music and decided the new version was superior to the original plan.

== Reception ==
=== Viewers ===
The episode was watched by 0.424 million viewers, earning a 0.2 in the 18-49 rating demographics on the Nielson ratings scale. This means that 0.2 percent of all households with televisions watched the episode. This was a 21% decrease from the previous episode, which was watched by 0.532 million viewers with a 0.2 in the 18-49 demographics.

=== Critical reviews ===
"The Power of No" received positive reviews. Vikram Murthi of The A.V. Club gave the episode a "B" and wrote, "But is Barry evil? It's a reasonable question, though one that the series has little interest in answering definitely. Bill Hader and Alec Berg are understandably cagey about whether 'evil' is a static or fluid concept in the world of Barry. Can Barry change or was he doomed the first moment he accepted money in exchange for a life? What if it was before that, when he clinically killed three 'sheep fuckers' in Afghanistan and shared in celebration with his fellow troops? It will be interesting to see where the series lands on this question or if it addresses whether Barry is a product of external manipulation or a wholly autonomous individual."

Nick Harley of Den of Geek gave the episode a 4 star rating out of 5 and wrote, "For many people, the best part about acting is about the opportunity to inhabit someone else's life and escape your own for a brief period of time, but for the actors on Barry, they're hindered by their constant self-examination. In Barry's case, it's probably good that he's exploring who he is, because he's shown a shocking lack of remorse for horrible acts that he's committed. However, there's always the possibility that Barry discovers that he actually is some kind of monster, and instead of being repulsed and trying to fix it, he embraces it. That being said, there's always the potential that the danger coming at Barry from both the Burmese and the police catches up to him first." Carissa Pavlica of TV Fanatic gave the episode a 4.25 star rating out of 5 and wrote, "Barry will only go straight comedy when the show gives up on Barry's wishes to free himself from his darker side. That's not going to happen because it would be a worse show as a result."
