= The Show Must Go On, Probably? =

- Barry episode
- Episode no.: Season 2 Episode 1
- Directed by: Hiro Murai
- Written by: Alec Berg & Bill Hader
- Cinematography by: Paula Huidobro
- Editing by: Jeff Buchanan
- Original air date: March 31, 2019
- Running time: 38 minutes

Guest appearances
- John Pirruccello as Detective John Loach; Sarah Burns as Detective Mae Dunn; Darrell Britt-Gibson as Jermaine Jefrint; D'Arcy Carden as Natalie Greer; Andy Carey as Eric; Rightor Doyle as Nick Nicholby; Alejandro Furth as Antonio Manuel; Kirby Howell-Baptiste as Sasha Baxter; Michael Irby as Cristobal Sifuentes; Patricia Fa'asua as Esther; Nick Gracer as Yandal; Troy Caylak as Akhmal; Shaughn Buchholz as Hitman; James Hiroyuki Liao as Albert Nguyen; Michael Gray as Washington; JB Blanc as Batir

Episode chronology
← Previous "Chapter Eight: Know Your Truth"	Next → "The Power of No"

"The Show Must Go On, Probably?" is the first episode of the second season of the American crime tragicomedy television series Barry. It is the 9th overall episode of the series and was written by series creators Alec Berg and Bill Hader, and directed by Hiro Murai. Abandoning the "Chapter" title naming scheme of the first season, it was first broadcast on HBO in the United States on March 31, 2019.

The series follows Barry Berkman, a hitman from Cleveland who travels to Los Angeles to kill someone but finds himself joining an acting class taught by Gene Cousineau, where he meets aspiring actress Sally Reed and begins to question his path in life as he deals with his criminal associates such as Monroe Fuches and NoHo Hank. In the episode, Barry wants to move on with his life after the events at the lake house. However, Gene is grief-stricken after Moss' "disappearance" and considers ending the class. Meanwhile, NoHo Hank sees his life threatened when Cristobal collaborates with their rival and is also threatened by his family back in Chechnya.

According to Nielsen Media Research, the episode was seen by an estimated 0.532 million household viewers and gained a 0.2 ratings share among adults aged 18–49. The episode received critical acclaim, with critics praising the series' new direction following the first season, performances and darker tone.

== Plot ==
In Cleveland, Fuches (Stephen Root) surrenders to police after his hitman (Shaughn Buchholz) messes up a job and leads police to his motel room.

Back in Los Angeles, Gene (Henry Winkler) has been absent since Moss's "disappearance" (Note: As depicted in the Season One finale Chapter Eight: Know Your Truth) and Barry (Bill Hader) tries to get an apathetic class to rehearse The Front Page. Meanwhile, Hank (Anthony Carrigan) is upset when Sifuentes (Michael Irby) and the Bolivians ally with Esther's (Patricia Fa'asua) rival Burmese gang.

Barry visits Gene as Moss's former partner at the LAPD, Loach (John Pirruccello), informs him that his cabin is no longer an active crime scene, and Moss's case will be closed due to the lack of leads in her disappearance. Gene rebuffs Barry's plea to return to the class.

Hank receives a death threat from his family in Chechnya, who believe the Bolivians to be responsible for killing Goran. He visits Barry at his new job at Lululemon, telling him he protected him by lying to the Chechens that Esther had Goran killed. He asks Barry to kill Esther, but is rebuffed.

Gene arrives, cancels the play, and says that he wants to shut down the class permanently. When Barry suggests that the class could help Gene work through his grief, Gene bitterly says that talking about Moss would be like Barry opening up about the first time he killed someone. Barry confesses that he killed three possible enemy combatants from an impressive distance in Afghanistan while surveying with his partner Albert (James Hiroyuki Liao). As Barry talks, Gene has actors act out the scene, in which Barry is portrayed as remorseful. When asked, Barry says their interpretation is accurate, when in reality the other Marines celebrated with him. Gene is convinced to continue with the class.

Sally (Sarah Goldberg) praises Barry for his bravery, though is too busy to spend time with him. Hank confronts Barry again in the parking lot, asserts that Barry owes him for saving his life, and threatens to tell his family the truth about Goran and then kill him and the class if he refuses to kill Esther. Barry agrees to help.

Police match Fuches's DNA to the tooth found at the scene of Goran's murder. Loach is informed of this by his new partner, Mae Dunn (Sarah Burns), and quickly finds Fuches and Barry's connections to Cleveland and begins to suspect the latter.

== Production ==
=== Development ===
In March 2019, the episode's title was revealed as "The Show Must Go On, Probably?" (abandoning the "Chapter" title naming scheme of the first season) and it was announced that series creators Alec Berg and Bill Hader had written the episode while Hiro Murai had directed it. This was Berg's fourth writing credit, Hader's fourth writing credit, and Murai's third directing credit.

=== Writing ===
The writers considered many possible scenarios for the opening scene, with one idea including the revelation of Barry's actions after the woods. Staff writer Liz Sarnoff suggested ignoring that and explore new concepts for the season. Bill Hader brought up many story beats, which included Fuches' tooth, Loach's new partner and Fuches' new hitman. Sarnoff then suggested starting the season with Fuches' new hitman and his failed hit. That way, the story could be connected to Fuches' tooth through his arrest, culminating in Loach's discovery of Barry. The writers thought that connecting Fuches to Barry just because they were in Cleveland wouldn't work, so they added Loach staring at the photo from the lipstick camera.

== Reception ==
=== Viewers ===
The episode was watched by 0.532 million viewers, earning a 0.2 in the 18-49 rating demographics on the Nielson ratings scale. This means that 0.2 percent of all households with televisions watched the episode. This was a slight decrease from the previous episode, which was watched by 0.548 million viewers with a 0.2 in the 18-49 demographics.

=== Critical reviews ===
"The Show Must Go On, Probably?" received critical acclaim. Vikram Murthi of The A.V. Club gave the episode an "A" and wrote, "I had my own doubts about Barry's sustainability, mostly because its premise lends itself to the possibility of retreading the same material. There's a version of Barry that could essentially replicate its first season again and again until everyone becomes bored, and it would still do very well. There's always the fear that a series will be content with being in neutral rather than pushing itself to different territory. Luckily, my skepticism evaporated almost immediately after watching tonight’s cold open."

Alan Sepinwall of Rolling Stone wrote, "The return of HBO's dark comedy about a hitman-turned-actor highlights a common problem in modern TV: series that are perfectly built for one season but come back for more anyway." Ben Travers of IndieWire wrote, "The most biting gags often grow from the gloomiest corners of the soul, but what Hader and Berg are doing with Barry isn't focused on sharpening their fangs; they're not setting up laughs through Barry's descent, so much as they're using them to coax us into analyzing one of television's more challenging perspectives. Their interest lies in their lead, and so does the audience's. Barry Berkman is on the verge of becoming the next Walter White, and Barry could very well go the Breaking Bad route if it wants to — that's how dark the series is getting, and it's not a front. It's really, really good. Get ready."

Nick Harley of Den of Geek gave the episode a 4 star rating out of 5 and wrote, "The season finale of Barry's first outing was satisfying and complete enough to serve as a series finale, but here, Barry resets the table effortlessly, introducing new threats and shades to characters while still having a masterful hold over the show's disparate tone. I haven't anticipated the return of a show this much in quite some time, and thankfully, Barry delivers from the episode's very first moments. If things got heavy and complicated for Barry last year, then by the looks of it, he better buckle up." Jen Chaney of Vulture wrote, "Barry, like the series that shares his name, is still in a dark place this season. While the wannabe actor might not want to hear this, that's a place that suits him, and Barry, just perfectly."
