= Donna Britt =

Donna Britt may refer to:

- Donna Britt (news anchor) (1958–2021), American television news anchor
- Donna Britt (writer), American author and former newspaper journalist
