= Chapter Seven: Loud, Fast, and Keep Going =

- Barry episode
- Episode no.: Season 1 Episode 7
- Directed by: Alec Berg
- Written by: Elizabeth Sarnoff
- Cinematography by: Paula Huidobro
- Editing by: Jeff Buchanan
- Original air date: May 6, 2018
- Running time: 37 minutes

Guest appearances
- Paula Newsome as Detective Janice Moss; Chris Marquette as Chris Lucado; John Pirruccello as Detective John Loach; Karen David as Sharon Lucado; Michael Irby as Cristobal Sifuentes

Episode chronology
← Previous "Chapter Six: Listen With Your Ears, React With Your Face"	Next → "Chapter Eight: Know Your Truth"

"Chapter Seven: Loud, Fast, and Keep Going" is the seventh episode in the first season of the American crime tragicomedy television series Barry. The episode was directed by series co-creator Alec Berg and written by Elizabeth Sarnoff, and originally aired on HBO on May 6, 2018. In the episode, Barry (Bill Hader) deals with the aftermath of the botched bum-rush and begins to struggle with the morality of his actions.

The episode received acclaim from critics, particularly for Hader's performance. At the 70th Primetime Emmy Awards, Hader won the Outstanding Lead Actor in a Comedy Series for his performance in the episode, while Sarnoff was nominated for Outstanding Writing for a Comedy Series.

== Plot ==
In the aftermath of the botched bum-rush, Taylor and Vaughn are dead, and Barry (Bill Hader) and Chris (Chris Marquette) have fled. A Bolivian mobster finds and nearly kills Barry before being shot dead by Chris. The Bolivian mafia leader, Cristobal Sifuentes (Michael Irby), phones Goran (Glenn Fleshler), informing him about the two dead soldiers and tells him that he would've gladly shared the stash house, but since his people were killed, they are now at war. Assuming one of the dead was Barry, NoHo Hank (Anthony Carrigan) tells Fuches (Stephen Root) that Barry is dead, causing Fuches to break down.

Meanwhile, the police listen in on the call between Cristobal and Goran, and Detective Moss (Paula Newsome) pinpoints Barry as the prime suspect of Ryan Madison's murder due to his background as a Marine. However, police find Ryan's copy of Gene's book (that he gave to Barry) at Taylor's apartment, leading Taylor to become the main suspect.

Barry arrives at the community center and is informed by Sally (Sarah Goldberg) that the police found money in the theater and that they suspect Ryan is involved with the Chechen mafia. At rehearsal, Barry struggles to deliver his one line and is berated by Sally and Gene (Henry Winkler), the latter suspecting that Barry is on drugs. Barry later meets up with a traumatized Chris at a remote location. Chris tells Barry that to clear his conscience, he will go to the authorities and confess. Despite Chris then trying to backtrack, Barry kills him and stages the scene as a suicide before fleeing.

Barry returns to the community center and Sally tells him that a talent agent from The Gersh Agency that she invited is present, and begs him to give her something she can work with. As Barry waits in the wings, he becomes overwhelmed with guilt over killing Chris. He then goes on stage and tearfully delivers his one line announcing the death of Lady Macbeth; Sally proceeds to harness Barry's delivery to give an outstanding performance of the "Tomorrow and tomorrow and tomorrow" soliloquy. After the show, Gene praises Barry backstage, but he remains wracked with guilt. Back in the theater, Sally tells Barry that the agent was impressed by her performance, and thanks Barry for helping her. After Sally leaves, Barry stands alone on the stage, staring into the empty audience.

== Reception ==
The episode received critical acclaim, with Hader's performance receiving particular praise. Vikram Murthi of The A.V. Club gave the episode an A rating and said it "makes a bold turn that makes the whole show suddenly click." Nick Harley, in a review for Den of Geek, praised the episode and said "The way Hader and Co. are able to constantly surprise and effortlessly toggle back and forth between jokes and drama is completely spellbinding." Writing for The Ringer, Alison Herman called Hader's performance "flat-out extraordinary" and said the episode did not "shy away from confronting their viewers with the full extent of Barry's corruption."

At the 70th Primetime Emmy Awards, Hader was awarded the Outstanding Lead Actor in a Comedy Series for his performance while Liz Sarnoff was nominated for Outstanding Writing for a Comedy Series.
