= Transcending (film) =

American comedy drama film

- Directed by: Mike Luciano
- Screenplay by: Raleigh Cain
- Produced by: Paige Blankenship; Courtney Tait
- Starring: Tone Bell; Raleigh Cain; Heidi Gardner; Kirby Howell-Baptiste
- Production companies: The Launch Company; Blank Paige Films
- Country: United States
- Language: English

Transcending is an upcoming American black comedy film starring Tone Bell, Raleigh Cain, Heidi Gardner and Kirby Howell-Baptiste.

== Premise ==
An artist rents a room in a Midwest town from a widow who is convinced the soul of her late husband inhabits her house.

== Cast ==
- Tone Bell
- Raleigh Cain
- Heidi Gardner
- Kirby Howell-Baptiste
- Nicole Byer
- Peter Gardner
- Kevin Morby

== Production ==
The film is directed by Mike Luciano in his feature length directorial debut, from a script by Raleigh Cain. It is from The Launch Company and Blank Paige Films and produced by Paige Blankenship and Courtney Tait.

The cast is led by Tone Bell, Raleigh Cain, Heidi Gardner and Kirby Howell-Baptiste as well as Pete Gardner and Nicole Byer, and the musician Kevin Morby who has his music featured in the film.

Principal photography took place in Kansas, Missouri and Belton, Missouri, and was completed by July 2025.
