= Nina Dobrev =

Canadian actress (born 1989)

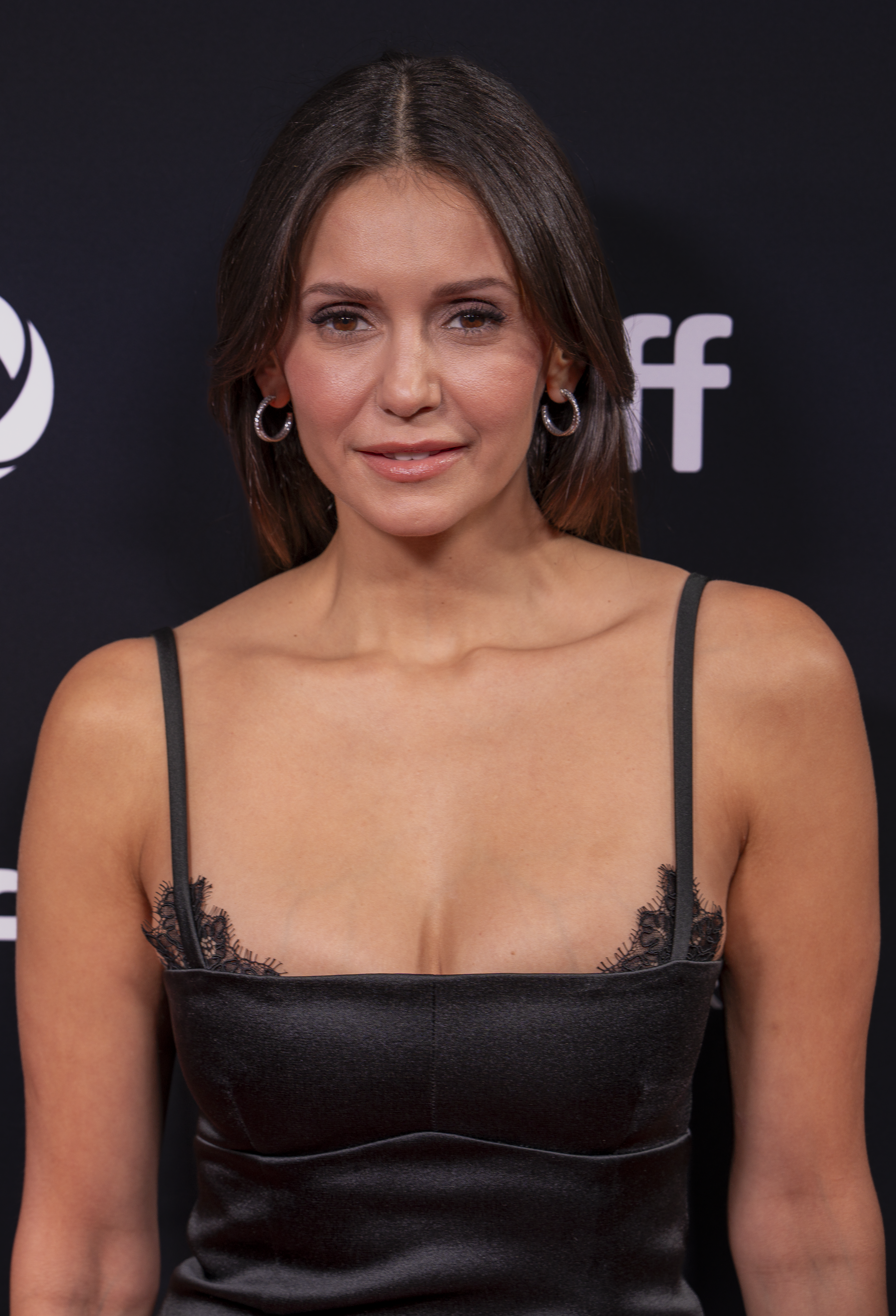
- Dobrev at the 2025 Toronto International Film Festival
- Born: Nikolina Kamenova Dobreva; January 9, 1989 (age 37); Sofia, Bulgaria
- Citizenship: Bulgaria; Canada
- Occupation: Actress
- Years active: 2006–present

Nikolina Kamenova Dobreva (Bulgarian: Николина Каменова Добрева; born January 9, 1989), known professionally as Nina Dobrev (/ˈdoʊbrɛv/ DOH-brev), is a Canadian actress. She is known for portraying Elena Gilbert and Katherine Pierce in The CW's supernatural drama series The Vampire Diaries (2009–2015).

Born in Sofia and raised in Toronto, Dobrev made her screen debut playing minor roles in various films, before landing her breakout role as Mia Jones in the drama series Degrassi: The Next Generation (2006–2009). She later rose to prominence with her role in The Vampire Diaries, and appeared in several feature films, including the 2012 coming-of-age drama The Perks of Being a Wallflower, the comedies Let's Be Cops and The Final Girls (2014), and the 2017 science-fiction drama Flatliners. Her biggest commercial success came with XXX: Return of Xander Cage (2017). She also starred in the romantic comedies Dog Days (2018), Then Came You (2018), and Love Hard (2021), and she had a leading role in the sitcom Fam (2019).

== Early life ==
Nikolina Kamenova Dobreva was born on January 9, 1989, in Sofia, Bulgaria, to Kamen Dobrev, a computer specialist, and Michaela Dobreva (née Radeva), an artist. She has an older brother named Alexander, nicknamed Alex, who is a computer specialist. When she was two, her family relocated to Canada, where she was raised in Scarborough, Toronto and attended Vradenburg Junior Public School. At age 10, she moved back to Bulgaria with her mother for two years and here, in Sofia, Nina was placed two grades below her age group because the Bulgarian education system was more advanced than the Canadian one. After returning to Canada, she was able to rejoin her peers and continue her education alongside students her own age.

Dobrev later attended J. B. Tyrrell Sr. Public School, where she started ballet and jazz classes and competed in rhythmic gymnastics. She took acting classes at Armstrong Acting Studios in Toronto. Dobrev subsequently attended the arts program at Wexford Collegiate School for the Arts in Scarborough until her graduating year.

Dobrev entered post-secondary studies at Ryerson University (now Toronto Metropolitan University) in Toronto, majoring in sociology, though her pursuit of an acting career prevented her from graduating.

== Career ==
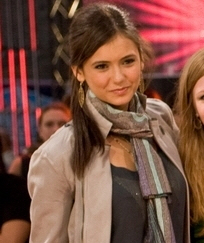
Dobrev at the 2008 Toronto International Film Festival

Dobrev's first major acting role was as Mia on the teen drama television series Degrassi: The Next Generation, a role she played for three seasons starting in 2006. She appeared in several feature films in the mid-2000s, including Fugitive Pieces (2007) and Away from Her (2007). Dobrev also headlined a number of television films, including Sci Fi Channel's Never Cry Werewolf (2008), MTV's The American Mall (2008), and two Lifetime original movies.

Dobrev left Degrassi in 2009 to star in The CW's supernatural drama series The Vampire Diaries, a television adaptation of the book series of the same name, playing the lead role of Elena Gilbert. Dobrev recurrently played a 500-year-old doppelgänger vampire named Katherine Pierce. She played the Petrova doppelgänger progenitor Amara, also known as the world's first immortal, in season 5. She crossed over to The Vampire Diaries spinoff The Originals, as doppelgänger character Tatia, in an episode in 2014. In April 2015, Dobrev announced via Instagram that she would be leaving The Vampire Diaries after portraying Elena for six seasons. In January 2017, it was announced that Dobrev would return as Elena and Katherine in The Vampire Diaries series finale. In September 2025, roughly eight years since the series ended, Dobrev confirmed in an interview with Harper's Bazaar that the reason she departed the The Vampire Diaries was due to The CW unwilling to pay her equal to the show's two leading actors, Paul Wesley and Ian Somerhalder.

Dobrev had a minor role in Atom Egoyan's erotic thriller Chloe, theatrically released by Sony Pictures Classics on March 26, 2010. Dobrev also had a small role in the 2011 film The Roommate.

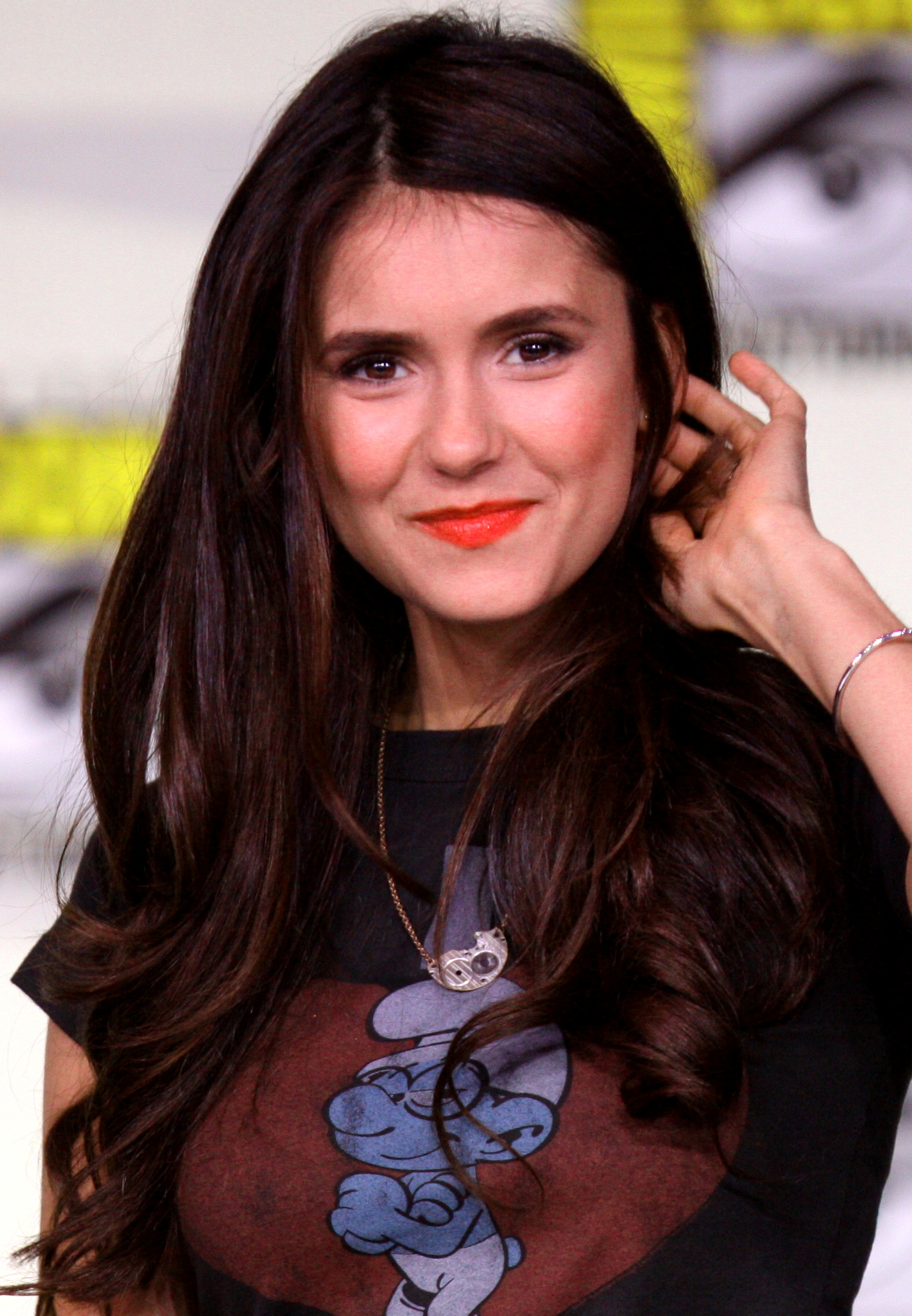
Dobrev at the 2011 San Diego Comic-Con

In April 2011, Dobrev was cast as Candace Kelmeckis in the film adaptation of The Perks of Being a Wallflower. In August 2014, she starred in the 20th Century Fox comedy Let's Be Cops.

Dobrev played the role of Vicki Summers in the 2015 horror comedy film The Final Girls. In September 2015, she was cast in the film Arrivals as flight attendant Izzy; the film was later retitled Departures and was scheduled to go into production in April 2017. That year, she was also cast in the romantic comedy Crash Pad, which began filming in Vancouver in fall 2015.

In 2017, Dobrev co-starred as weapons specialist Becky Clearidge in the action film sequel XXX: Return of Xander Cage. It grossed $346 million worldwide, becoming Dobrev's most successful film. The same year, she co-starred as Marlo in the remake of Flatliners.

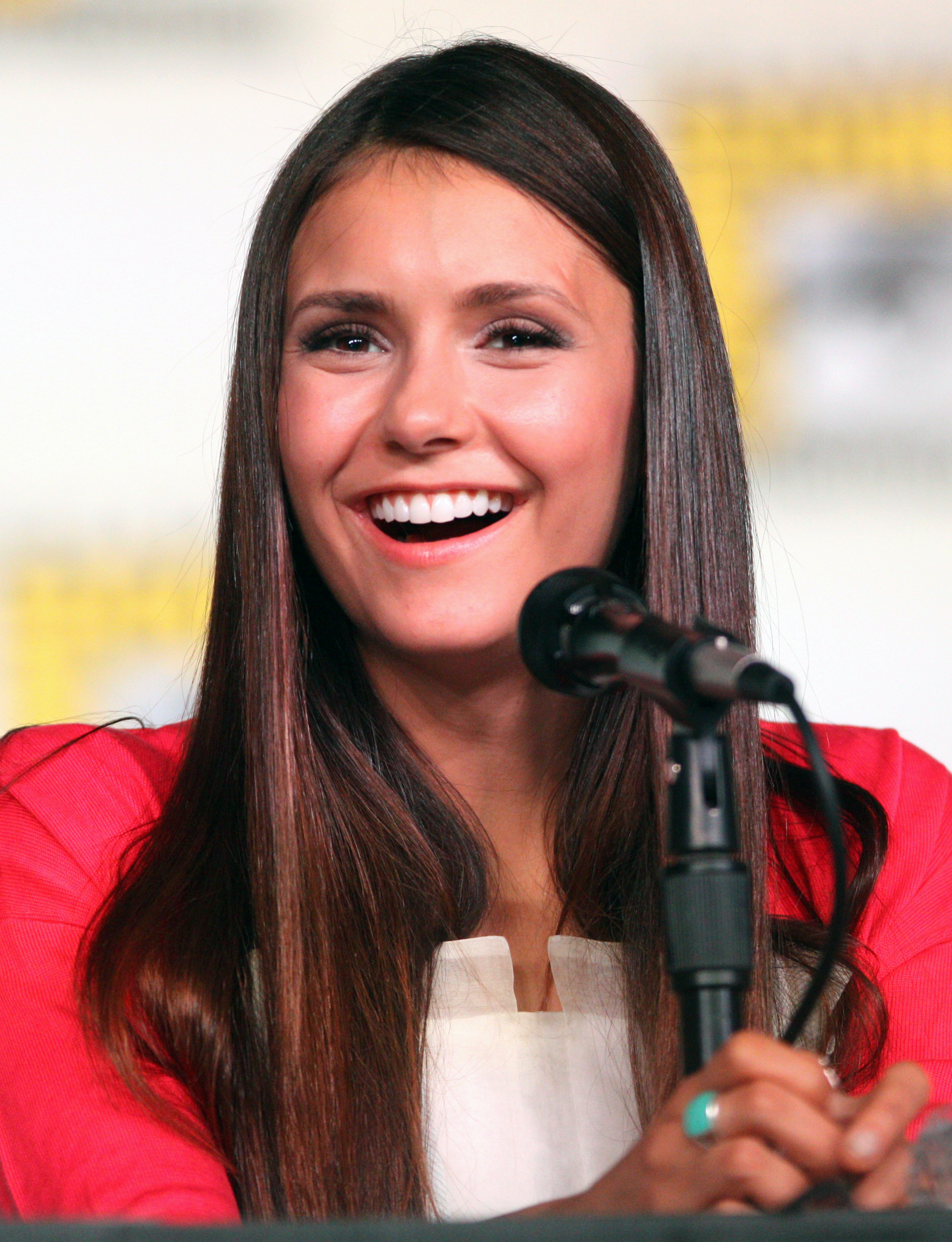
Dobrev at the 2012 San Diego Comic-Con

In March 2018, Dobrev was cast as Clem in the comedy Fam, a CBS sitcom pilot that was picked up to series in May 2018. It premiered January 10, 2019. It was canceled on May 10, 2019, after one season. Dobrev starred as Chloe in the Roger Avary thriller Lucky Day, released 2019. She also joined the cast of the film Run This Town, which was released in March 2020. In July 2020, it was announced that Dobrev would star in and serve as an executive producer for a television adaptation of the Woman 99 book series.

== Activism and charity work ==
Dobrev supports multiple charitable causes, including Puma's 2011 non-profit Project Pink, which supports numerous breast cancer charities, and Hunger Bites, an organization that is dedicated to reducing hunger in 27 districts across Pennsylvania. She is also recognized for her long-term involvement with the WE movement, a Canadian-based charity that empowers youth as agents of change. She took part in a Me to We volunteer trip to Kenya to help build a school. She hosted the We Day event in Toronto in 2011 and made an appearance on stage at WE Day California 2019. Other social and charity issues with which she has been involved include the Elton John AIDS Foundation. She also attended the film premiere for The Promise, a film about the Armenian genocide, featuring Hollywood actors Christian Bale and Oscar Isaac.

== Personal life ==
Dobrev is a dual citizen of Bulgaria and Canada. She speaks fluent English and Bulgarian, and she is conversant in French. Her mother tongue is Bulgarian. While filming The Vampire Diaries, she lived in Atlanta; however, she moved to Los Angeles after leaving the series in 2015.

Dobrev has invested in various beverage companies and co-owns a wine brand with dancer Julianne Hough called Fresh Vine Wine.

From 2010 to 2013, Dobrev was in a relationship with American actor and The Vampire Diaries co-star Ian Somerhalder. She later dated retired American professional snowboarder, skateboarder and Olympic gold medalist Shaun White. They became engaged in October 2024, but in September 2025, it was reported that they had ended their engagement and separated.

On Dobrev's birthday in 2025, she had to evacuate her Los Angeles home due to a wildfire. Her home did not burn down, which made her feel survivor's guilt.

== Filmography ==
=== Film ===
Key
†	Denotes films that have not yet been released

Year	Title	Role	Notes
2006	Repo! The Genetic Opera	Teenage Zydrate addict	Short film
2007	Away from Her	Monica	
2007	Fugitive Pieces	Bella	
2007	How She Move	Tall girl in bathroom	
2007	The Poet	Rachel	
2009	Chloe	Anna	
2011	Arena	Lori Lord	
2011	The Roommate	Maria	
2012	The Perks of Being a Wallflower	Candace Kelmeckis	
2014	Let's Be Cops	Josie	
2015	The Final Girls	Vicki Summers	
2017	Crash Pad	Hannah	
2017	Flatliners	Marlo	
2017	XXX: Return of Xander Cage	Becky Clearidge	
2018	Dog Days	Elizabeth	
2018	Then Came You	Izzy	
2019	Lucky Day	Chloe	
2019	Run This Town	Ashley Pollock	
2021	Fin	N/A	Executive producer
2021	Love Hard	Natalie Bauer	
2021	The One	N/A	Short film; director, co-writer and producer
2022	Redeeming Love	Mae	
2023	The Out-Laws	Parker McDermott	
2023	Sick Girl	Wren Pepper	Also executive producer
2024	The Bricklayer	Kate	
2024	Reunion	Amanda Tanner	
2026	The Get Out	Carrie	
TBA	It Happened One Summer †	Piper Bellinger	Post-production
TBA	The Streak †		Post-production

=== Television ===
Year	Title	Role	Notes
2006	Playing House	Young Frannie McKenzie	Television film
2006–2009	Degrassi: The Next Generation	Mia Jones	Recurring role (season 6); main role (seasons 7–8); guest star (season 9)
2007	My Daughter's Secret	Justine Dysert	Television film
2007	Too Young to Marry	Jessica Carpenter	Television film
2008	The American Mall	Ally Shepherd	Television film
2008	The Border	Stephenie	2 episodes
2008	Never Cry Werewolf	Loren Hansett	Television film
2009	Degrassi Goes Hollywood	Mia Jones	Television film
2009	Eleventh Hour	Grace Dahl	Episode: "Eternal"
2009	Merry Madagascar	Cupid the Reindeer (voice)	Christmas special
2009–2015; 2017	The Vampire Diaries	Elena Gilbert	Lead role (seasons 1–6); guest role (season 8)
2009–2015; 2017	The Vampire Diaries	Katherine Pierce	Recurring role (season 1); main role (seasons 2–5); guest role (season 8)
2009–2015; 2017	The Vampire Diaries	Amara	Recurring role (season 5); 3 episodes
2011	Family Guy	Gina (voice)	Episode: "Trading Places"
2011	The Super Hero Squad Show	Ellen Brandt (voice)	Episode: "This Man-Thing, This Monster!"
2014	The Originals	Tatia	Special guest star; episode: "Red Door"
2014	Robot Chicken	Cortana, Abby, Jenny Curran (voice)	Episode: "Panthropologie"
2016	Lip Sync Battle	Herself	Episode: "Tim Tebow vs. Nina Dobrev"
2017	Workaholics	Courtnee	Episode: "Termidate"
2019	Fam	Clem	Main role

=== Music videos ===
Year	Title	Artist	Ref.
2009	"You Got That Light"	Wade Allain-Marcus & David Baum	
2014	"Imagine" (UNICEF: World version)	Various	
2018	"I'm Upset"	Drake	

== Awards and nominations ==
Year	Association	Category	Nominated work	Result	Ref.
2010	Teen Choice Awards	Choice TV Actress – Fantasy/Sci-Fi	The Vampire Diaries	Won	
2010	Teen Choice Awards	Choice TV Breakout Star – Female	The Vampire Diaries	Won	
2010	Young Hollywood Awards	Cast to Watch (with Paul Wesley and Ian Somerhalder)	The Vampire Diaries	Won	
2010	Young Hollywood Awards	Making Their Mark	The Vampire Diaries	Won	
2011	Teen Choice Awards	Choice Hottie – Female	The Vampire Diaries	Nominated	
2011	Teen Choice Awards	Choice TV Actress – Fantasy/Sci-Fi	The Vampire Diaries	Won	
2011	Teen Choice Awards	Choice Vampire	The Vampire Diaries	Nominated	
2012	People's Choice Awards	Favorite TV Drama Actress	The Vampire Diaries	Won	
2012	San Diego Film Critics Society	Best Ensemble Performance	The Perks of Being a Wallflower	Won	
2012	Teen Choice Awards	Choice TV Actress – Fantasy/Sci-Fi	The Vampire Diaries	Won	
2013	People's Choice Awards	Favorite Dramatic TV Actress	The Vampire Diaries	Nominated	
2013	Teen Choice Awards	Choice TV Actress – Fantasy/Sci-Fi	The Vampire Diaries	Won	
2014	MTV Fandom Awards	Ship of the Year (with Ian Somerhalder)	The Vampire Diaries	Won	
2014	People's Choice Awards	Favorite On-Screen Chemistry (with Ian Somerhalder)	The Vampire Diaries	Won	
2014	People's Choice Awards	Favorite Sci-Fi/Fantasy TV Actress	The Vampire Diaries	Nominated	
2014	Teen Choice Awards	Choice TV Actress: Fantasy/Sci-Fi	The Vampire Diaries	Won	
2014	Young Hollywood Awards	Best Threesome (with Paul Wesley and Ian Somerhalder)	The Vampire Diaries	Won	
2014	Young Hollywood Awards	Fan Favorite Actor – Female	The Vampire Diaries	Nominated	
2015	People's Choice Awards	Favorite Sci-Fi/Fantasy TV Actress	The Vampire Diaries	Nominated	
2015	People's Choice Awards	Favorite TV Duo (with Ian Somerhalder)	The Vampire Diaries	Won	
2015	Teen Choice Awards	Choice TV Actress: Fantasy/Sci-Fi	The Vampire Diaries	Won	
2015	Teen Choice Awards	Choice TV: Liplock (with Ian Somerhalder)	The Vampire Diaries	Won	
2017	Teen Choice Awards	Choice Movie Actress: Action	XXX: Return of Xander Cage	Nominated	
2019	Teen Choice Awards	Choice TV Actress Comedy	Fam	Won	
