= Dog Days (2018 film) =

- Theatrical release poster
- Directed by: Ken Marino
- Screenplay by: Elissa Matsueda; Erica Oyama
- Story by: Elissa Matsueda
- Produced by: Mickey Liddell; Pete Shilaimon; Jennifer Monroe
- Starring: Nina Dobrev; Vanessa Hudgens; Adam Pally; Eva Longoria; Rob Corddry; Tone Bell; Jon Bass; Michael Cassidy; Thomas Lennon; Tig Notaro; Finn Wolfhard; Ron Cephas Jones
- Cinematography: Frank Barrera
- Edited by: Brian Scofield
- Music by: Craig Wedren
- Distributed by: LD Entertainment
- Release date: August 8, 2018 (United States)
- Running time: 113 minutes
- Country: United States
- Language: English
- Budget: $10 million
- Box office: $10.3 million

Dog Days is a 2018 American romantic comedy film directed by Ken Marino and written by Elissa Matsueda and Erica Oyama. It stars Eva Longoria, Nina Dobrev, Vanessa Hudgens, Lauren Lapkus, Thomas Lennon, Adam Pally, Ryan Hansen, Rob Corddry, Tone Bell, Jon Bass and Finn Wolfhard. The plot follows the intertwining lives of various dogs and their owners around Los Angeles.

The movie was released on August 8, 2018, by LD Entertainment, and received mixed reviews from critics.

== Plot ==
Los Angeles is the main and backdrop where life and fate interconnect five different stories as well as their characters with their respective canines:

Elizabeth is a famous newscaster of a morning TV show; after a disastrous interview with former football player Jimmy, Elizabeth's boss decides to contract him as co-host due to the interview's high ratings.

In another part of town, coffee shop barista Tara passes her days talking with her shallow, dog-walker friend Daisy. Tara, who is crazy about the friendly but full of himself vet Dr. Mike, one day meets Garrett, the eccentric and shy owner of an animal care center who is unable to tell Tara how he feels about her.

Grace and Kurt are a married couple struggling to properly prepare for the arrival of their adoptive daughter, Amelia. When she moves in, she does not seem happy with her new home or her new parents.

Dax is a teen in the body of an adult and leader of the aspiring rock band Frunk. After a visit to his pregnant sister Ruth and her husband Greg, he is forced to take care of Ruth's dog, despite his building not allowing dogs.

Finally Walter, an aging, lonely widower, loses his dog when it escapes and runs off. His regular pizza delivery driver Tyler unexpectedly offers to help find her.

As time moves on, things become more complicated: Elizabeth and Jimmy start to feel attracted to each other, making their work more difficult. After they have been dating for some time, she finds out (from her makeup artist) that Jimmy has been offered a position hosting a show on another channel.

Tara accepts a volunteer job working at Garrett’s animal care center, at the same time she starts to date Dr. Mike. Meanwhile, Garrett learns that the owner of the building has sold it, so he has to relocate the center.

Amelia finds Walter's dog, which makes her happy, but Grace and Kurt fear that one day she will lose her new friend when the owner appears; Dax is caring for Ruth's dog, although eventually it starts to put order in his life, even as it creates trouble to hide it from his neighbors. Walter begins helping Tyler with his studies in exchange for help finding his dog. Jimmy has to put his dog Brandy down after she suffers a stroke. After hearing the news Elizabeth realizes she loves Jimmy and wants to be with him.

Tara works to help Garrett save his animal shelter by organizing a fund-raiser with live music, which culminates in all the main characters' fates intertwining in unexpected ways. Walter, seeing how attached Amelia is to his dog, lets her keep it as long as they visit regularly. He also opens his home to the shelter, simultaneously curing him of his loneliness.

== Cast ==
- Vanessa Hudgens as Tara, a barista
- Michael Cassidy as Mike, a veterinarian
- Jon Bass as Garrett, who runs a dog shelter
- Nina Dobrev as Elizabeth, who hosts a morning show
- Tone Bell as Jimmy, an athlete
- Adam Pally as Dax, a musician
- Jessica St. Clair as Ruth, Dax's pregnant sister
- Thomas Lennon as Greg, Ruth's husband
- Ron Cephas Jones as Walter, a widower
- Finn Wolfhard as Tyler, a pizza delivery boy
- Eva Longoria as Grace, who is adopting a daughter
- Rob Corddry as Kurt, Grace's husband
- Elizabeth Caro as Amelia, who is adopted by Grace and Kurt
- Lauren Lapkus as Daisy, a dog-walker
- John Gemberling as Ernie, Mike's assistant
- Jessica Lowe as Amy, the makeup girl at Elizabeth's show
- Phoebe Neidhardt as Alexa, a weather girl
- Toks Olagundoye as Nina, Elizabeth's boss
- Tig Notaro as Danielle, a dog therapist
- David Wain as Wacky Wayne, a clown
- Ryan Hansen as Peter, Elizabeth's boyfriend
- Jasmine Cephas Jones as Lola, a singer in Dax's band
- Tony Cavalero as Stanley, a drummer in Dax's band

== Production ==
In August 2017, it was announced Ken Marino would direct the film, from a screenplay by Elissa Matsueda and Erica Oyama, with Mickey Liddell, Jennifer Monroe and Pete Shilaimon producing under their LD Entertainment banner. In September 2017, Finn Wolfhard, Vanessa Hudgens, Tone Bell, Adam Pally, Eva Longoria, and Jon Bass joined the cast of the film. In October 2017, Tig Notaro, Rob Corddry, Michael Cassidy, Jasmine Cephas Jones, Ron Cephas Jones, John Gemberling, Ryan Hansen, Thomas Lennon, Lauren Lapkus, Jessica Lowe, Toks Olagundoye, Jessica St. Clair and David Wain joined the cast of the film.

=== Filming ===
Principal photography began in October 2017, in Los Angeles, California.

== Release ==
The film was released on August 8, 2018 by LD Entertainment.

== Reception ==
=== Box office ===
In the United States and Canada, Dog Days was projected to gross $5–9 million from 2,442 theaters over its five-day opening weekend. The film made $635,164 on its opening day, a Wednesday, and another $405,000 on its second for a two-day total of $1 million. It went on to have an opening weekend of $2.6 million, for a five-day debut of just $3.6 million. In its second weekend of release, the film was removed from 55 theaters across the country, dropping 66% and grossing $868,664.

=== Critical response ===
On the review aggregation website Rotten Tomatoes, the film holds an approval rating of 63% based on 68 reviews. The website's critical consensus reads, "Dog Days is frivolous but frothy, sporting a forgettable cast of human characters but a lovable troupe of pooches that ought to delight viewers looking for a gentle affirmation of humanity's bond with their furry friends." On Metacritic, the film has a weighted average score of 47 out of 100, based on reviews from 19 critics, indicating "mixed or average" reviews. Audiences polled by CinemaScore gave the film an average grade of "A−" on an A+ to F scale.
