= Tone Bell =

American comedian and actor

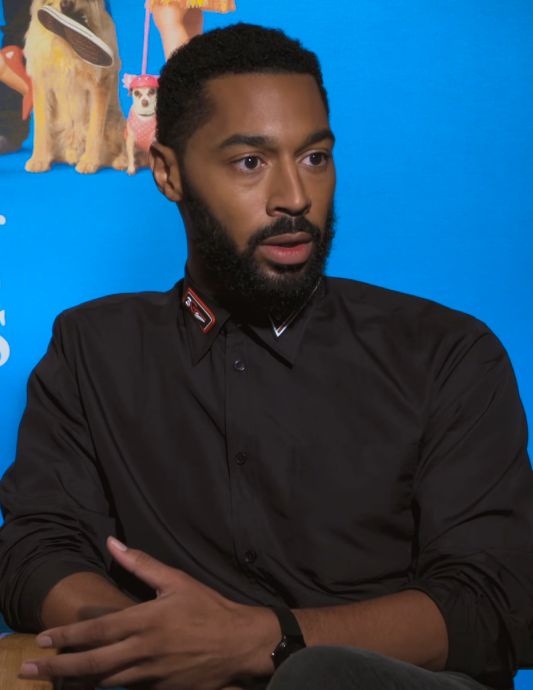
- Bell in August 2018
- Born: Michael Anthony Bell II; Decatur, Georgia, U.S.

Comedy career
- Years active: 2004–present
- Medium: Stand-up, film, television
- Website: tonebell.com

Michael Anthony Bell II, known professionally as Tone Bell, is an American stand-up comedian and actor.

== Early life ==
Bell was born in Decatur, Georgia. He attended Savannah State University where he studied communications with a concentration in radio and television and became a member of Alpha Phi Alpha fraternity. After graduating in 2004 he taught first grade before working on the production of HBO's Warm Springs and doing other various promo work.

Bell took a job in San Francisco as a brand manager with Swivel Media for a year, before moving back to Atlanta. There he started doing promotion work for a beer company that eventually transferred him to Dallas where he started doing open-mics at various comedy clubs.

== Career ==
Shortly after moving to Los Angeles, Bell won the NBC Stand Up For Diversity Talent Search in 2012 and was awarded a development deal from the network. He was cast as "RJ" the bartender in the NBC sitcom Whitney and later as "Tedward" in NBC's Bad Judge. Bell also appeared in other TV shows, including VH1's Single Ladies, E!'s Love You, Mean It with Whitney Cummings, Comedy Central's Key & Peele and Game Show Network's Mind of a Man and hosted the first season of hidden camera show Jerks with Cameras on MTV.

Bell also has a web series on Russell Simmons' YouTube channel All Def Digital called The Green Room.

In March 2018, Bell was cast in a lead role for the CBS comedy pilot Fam after having starred in the Netflix multi-camera comedy Disjointed.

Bell is the host of the new Netflix reality show Drink Masters, which premiered October 28, 2022. He stars as Khalil in the Netflix comedy series, Survival of the Thickest written by Michelle Buteau.

== Filmography ==
=== Films ===
Year	Title	Role	Notes
2013	Solstice	Bartender #1	Short film
2013	Implanted	Philip	
2013	To My Future Assistant	Davis	Television film
2016	My Time Your Time	Parker	Television film
2017	Woman Child	Michael Abby	Short film
2018	Dog Days	Jimmy	
2018	The Weekend	Bradford Collins	
2018	It’s A Party	Cool Breeze	
2019	Little	Preston	
2020	Sylvie's Love	Dickie Brewster	
2021	The United States vs. Billie Holiday	John Levy	
2021	Horror Noire	Marcus	
2024	Trigger Warning	Spider	
2026	Coyote vs. Acme	Sal Maltese	Filmed in 2023
TBA	Transcending	TBA	Post-production

=== Television series ===
Year	Title	Role	Notes
2012	Single Ladies	Parker	2 episodes
2012–2013	Whitney	RJ	Main role, 13 episodes
2013	Creepy Caress	Tom	1 episode
2013	Key & Peele	Friend #1	1 episode
2014–2015	Bad Judge	Tedward Mulray	Main role, 13 episodes
2015	Truth Be Told	Russell	Main role, 10 episodes
2016	The Flash	Scott Evans	2 episodes
2017	9JKL	Luke	2 episodes
2017–2018	Disjointed	Carter	Main role, 20 episodes
2019	Fam	Nick	Main role, 13 episodes
2020	BoJack Horseman	Voice	1 episode
2020	American Soul	Richard Pryor	Recurring role
2022	Nailed It!	Himself	1 episode
2022	Drink Masters	Host	10 episodes
2023–present	Survival of the Thickest	Khalil	Main Cast
