= Fam (TV series) =

2019 American television sitcom

- Genre: Sitcom
- Created by: Corinne Kingsbury
- Starring: Nina Dobrev; Tone Bell; Odessa Adlon; Sheryl Lee Ralph; Brian Stokes Mitchell; Gary Cole
- Composer: Gabriel Mann
- Country of origin: United States
- Original language: English
- No. of seasons: 1
- No. of episodes: 13

Production
- Executive producers: Corinne Kingsbury; Aaron Kaplan; Wendi Trilling; Dana Honor; Bob Kushell; Joe Port; Joe Wiseman
- Cinematography: Patti Lee
- Editor: Pamela Marshall
- Camera setup: Multi-camera
- Running time: 21 minutes
- Production companies: Kushellivision; Trill Television; CBS Television Studios; Kapital Entertainment

Original release
- Network: CBS
- Release: January 10 – April 11, 2019

Fam is an American television sitcom created by Corinne Kingsbury and that aired on CBS from January 10 to April 11, 2019. It stars Nina Dobrev, Tone Bell, Odessa Adlon, Sheryl Lee Ralph, Brian Stokes Mitchell and Gary Cole.

== Synopsis ==
The series revolves around Clem, a young woman who envisions her life as perfect after getting engaged to fiancé Nick, and loves her future in-laws Walt and Rose. However, her world is turned upside down when her out-of-control teenage half-sister Shannon moves in, and her estranged police detective father Freddy comes back into her life.

== Cast ==
=== Main ===
- Nina Dobrev as Clem, a recently engaged woman who works in event planning for Metropolitan Museum of Art
- Tone Bell as Nick, Clem's fiancé and an associate professor of world literature at NYU
- Odessa Adlon as Shannon, Clem's rebellious 16-year-old half-sister who dropped out of high school and ends up living with her
- Sheryl Lee Ralph as Rose, Nick's mother and a therapist
- Brian Stokes Mitchell as Walt, Nick's father and a Broadway star
- Gary Cole as Freddy, Clem and Shannon's estranged father who is a homicide detective at New York City Police Department

=== Recurring ===
- Blake Lee as Ben, Clem's best friend and an indoor cycling instructor
- Brendan Calton as Evan
- Charles Maceo as Officer Lopez
- Jearnest Corchado as Janelle

=== Guest stars ===
- John Ales as Darryl
- James Urbaniak as Tom
- Leslie David Baker as Mr. Kersey
- Kate Walsh as Jolene
- Curran Walters as Kyle
- Andre G. Ward as Felix
- David Pressman as Dean Kaiser
- Peter Adrian Sudarso as JoJo
- Christina DeRosa as Linda
- Emily Kosloski as Stacy
- Katie Wee as Kristen
- Matthew Broussard as Charlie
- Cooper Mothersbaugh as Max
- Andrew Santino as Spence
- Audrey Whitby as Beth
- Lindsey Kraft as Molly
- Ravi Patel as Joe
- Ryan Cartwright as David

== Production ==
=== Development ===
On May 11, 2018, it was announced that CBS had given the production a pilot-to-series order. The series' creator, Corinne Kingsbury, was also expected to executive produce alongside Bob Kushell, Aaron Kaplan, Wendi Trilling, and Dana Honor. Production companies involved with the series were slated to include Kapital Entertainment and CBS Television Studios. On July 13, 2018, it was reported that the first season would consist of thirteen episodes.

On November 5, 2018, it was reported that CBS had fired executive producer Bob Kushell for "inappropriate language in the workplace". After Kushnell was fired, it was announced that Joe Port and Joe Wiseman were promoted to executive-produce alongside Kingsbury, Trilling, and Honor. On May 10, 2019, CBS canceled the series after one season.

=== Casting ===
Alongside the initial series announcement, it was reported that Nina Dobrev, Tone Bell, Odessa Adlon, Sheryl Lee Ralph, and Brian Stokes Mitchell had been cast in series regular roles.

=== Filming ===
Fam was filmed at Radford Studio Center in Studio City, California, but it is set in New York City, New York.

== Episodes ==
No.	Title	Directed by	Written by	Original release date	Prod. code	U.S. viewers (millions)
1	"Pilot"	Scott Ellis	Corinne Kingsbury	January 10, 2019	FAM101	7.34
Clem, a young woman living with her fiancé Nick, who comes from a seemingly well put-together family, gets a surprise; her rebellious teenage half-sister Shannon moves into her apartment after their father, Freddy, hardly takes any responsibility for her.
2	"Freddy Returns"	Victor Gonzalez	Joe Port & Joe Wiseman	January 17, 2019	FAM102	6.00
Clem lets Nick's parents, Rose and Walt, know ahead of time that she is not inviting Freddy to her wedding. In an effort to have Nick's parents know Freddy a lot better, Clem invites Freddy to Rose and Walt's apartment for dinner. Clem is then surprised by Freddy's new nicer attitude. Nick tries to teach Shannon about proper chore etiquette at home.
3	"Stealing Time"	Todd Holland	Stephanie Furman Darrow	January 24, 2019	FAM105	6.35
Shannon steals one of Walt's watches to buy an expensive pair of Yeezys. Upon finding out what Shannon has done, Clem and Nick enlist Freddy's help to get the watch back from the pawn shop that Shannon sold it to.
4	"It's Been A While"	Victor Gonzalez	Bill Martin & Mike Schiff	January 24, 2019	FAM103	5.03
Clem and Nick have been experiencing a lull in their sex life since Shannon has moved in. They set an appointment during the noon hour for some private time, until Shannon gets suspended from school.
5	"Jolene, Jolene"	Victor Gonzalez	Don D. Scott	January 31, 2019	FAM109	6.05
Shannon's free-spirited and irresponible mom Jolene (Kate Walsh), shows up. Now married to a rich old man, she tries to convince Shannon to come live with her in Arizona, while also undermining Clem's guardianship. At her wits end, Clem then goes to Freddy to stop the move from happening. Freddy is also offended that Clem does not want him to walk her down the aisle at her wedding.
6	"Pregnant Pause"	Todd Holland	Charles Brottmiller	February 14, 2019	FAM106	5.43
Clem finds a pregnancy test in Shannon's room and assumes that Shannon is pregnant. Nick finds that same pregnancy test and thinks that Clem is pregnant, which has him doubting whether he will be a good father.
7	"Drunk in Love"	Victor Gonzalez	Talia Bernstein	February 21, 2019	FAM104	5.58
In preparation for her engagement party, Clem agrees to tell the story about how she and Nick first met, but she has no recollection of their first encounter. Rose tries to make Walt jealous by telling him that one of his old friends had a crush on her.
8	"Jojo Returns"	Scott Ellis	Joe Port & Joe Wiseman	February 28, 2019	FAM110	5.09
Shannon's club DJ ex-boyfriend Jojo shows up, re-igniting their relationship. Jojo flirts with Clem when they are alone, but Nick and Shannon do not believe her, because Clem is paranoid that every guy that she meets flirts with her. In order to secure a bigger office when one of his fellow professors dies, Nick invites his boss to his wedding, which drives Rose crazy, as she wants a strict seating arrangement.
9	"Ocean View"	Todd Holland	Guy Endore-Kaiser	March 7, 2019	FAM107	5.68
Clem and Nick go on a one-night getaway at a fancy hotel. Feeling worried about leaving Shannon alone in their apartment, Clem and Nick ask Rose and Walt to watch Shannon for the night while they are away. However, with some convincing from Rose that Shannon is old enough to stay home alone, Clem and Nick eventually agree, until Shannon betrays the trust of her elders by throwing a house party. While at the fancy hotel, Clem and Nick bump into Nick's ex-girlfriend, Kristen. Clem is then shocked to learn that Nick previously lived with Kristen in their current apartment and that they previously went to the same fancy hotel. Meanwhile, Walt auditions to play a cop in a Broadway play.
10	"Dance Dance Resolution"	Scott Ellis	Bill Martin & Mike Schiff	March 14, 2019	FAM111	5.76
Freddy is mandated by the police department to undergo therapy sessions after taking part in a traumatic case and asks Clem to ask Rose, who is a therapist, to simply sign off that he went through therapy without dealing with any personal issues. Clem never learned how to drive, and Rose encourages her to have Freddy teach her, so they can spend more quality time together. Nick is extremely nervous about dancing at his wedding reception, and asks Walt to help him overcome his fears, with Shannon also helping by heckling his performance.
11	"Party Girl"	Victor Gonzalez	Darrin Bragg	March 14, 2019	FAM108	4.55
After being mistaken as Shannon's mom at a parent-teacher conference, Clem decides to turn her subdued bachelorette dinner party into a wild affair with a stripper. Nick gets a bad review on a teacher rating website, and it frequently bothers him to the point that it effects his own pre-wedding get-together. Shannon immediately becomes jealous when she sees Evan has a girlfriend, a fellow student named Beth (Audrey Whitby).
12	"Say Mess To The Dress"	Scott Ellis	Allison Gilbert	April 4, 2019	FAM112	4.79
Rose gives away her wedding dress to Clem so she can wear it for her wedding. However, Clem hates the dress, and later accidentally ruins it by spilling red wine on it. Just when Clem is about to tell Rose about ruining the dress, Shannon takes the blame in exchange for wanting a dog. Upon Shannon getting the dog, she realizes what a big responsibility it is. Nick's body is put through excruiating pain after taking Ben's cycling class.
13	"This is Fam"	Scott Ellis	Corinne Kingsbury	April 11, 2019	FAM113	4.93
As the wedding day for Clem and Nick approaches, Freddy shows her an old tape of Clem's deceased mother that was saved to show her before her wedding. However, the tape is cut off in the middle due to Freddy taping over it with an old episode of Baywatch from years ago. When Clem and Nick go to get their marriage license, Nick discovers that Clem was previously married to Ben, as part of a wedding prank in Las Vegas. As the wedding ceremony is about to begin, the family rushes to be with Freddy after he has an incident at work.

== Reception ==
=== Critical reception ===
The series holds an approval rating of 40% based on 10 reviews, with an average rating of 4.7/10 on Rotten Tomatoes. The website's critical consensus reads, "Despite an appealing cast, FAM flounders under the weight of its sitcom stylings, drowning much of its potential in a sea of familiar jokes that don't serve its progressive premise." Metacritic, which uses a weighted average, assigned the series a score of 54 out of 100 based on 7 critics.

=== Ratings ===
Viewership and ratings per episode of Fam
No.	Title	Air date	Rating/share (18–49)	Viewers (millions)	DVR (18–49)	DVR viewers (millions)	Total (18–49)	Total viewers (millions)
1	"Pilot"	January 10, 2019	1.2/5	7.34	0.5	1.72	1.7	9.07
2	"Freddy Returns"	January 17, 2019	0.9/4	6.00	—N/a	1.51	—N/a	7.51
3	"Stealing Time"	January 24, 2019	1.0/5	6.35	TBD	TBD	TBD	TBD
4	"It's Been a While"	January 24, 2019	0.8/4	5.03	TBD	TBD	TBD	TBD
5	"Jolene, Jolene"	January 31, 2019	1.0/5	6.05	0.3	1.21	1.3	7.26
6	"Pregnant Pause"	February 14, 2019	0.8/4	5.43	0.3	1.09	1.1	6.52
7	"Drunk in Love"	February 21, 2019	0.9/4	5.58	0.3	1.12	1.2	6.70
8	"Jojo Returns"	February 28, 2019	0.8/3	5.09	0.2	0.98	1.0	6.07
9	"Ocean View"	March 7, 2019	0.9/4	5.68	0.3	1.19	1.2	6.87
10	"Dance Dance Resolution"	March 14, 2019	0.9/3	5.76	0.2	0.72	1.1	6.49
11	"Party Girl"	March 14, 2019	0.7/4	4.55	0.2	0.76	0.9	5.31
12	"Say Mess To The Dress"	April 4, 2019	0.7/4	4.79	0.2	1.06	0.9	5.86
13	"This is Fam"	April 11, 2019	0.8/4	4.93	0.1	0.99	0.9	5.92

=== Awards and nominations ===
Year	Award	Category	Nominee(s)	Result	Ref.
2019	Teen Choice Awards	Choice TV Actress Comedy	Nina Dobrev	Won	
