= Kevin Merida =

American journalist

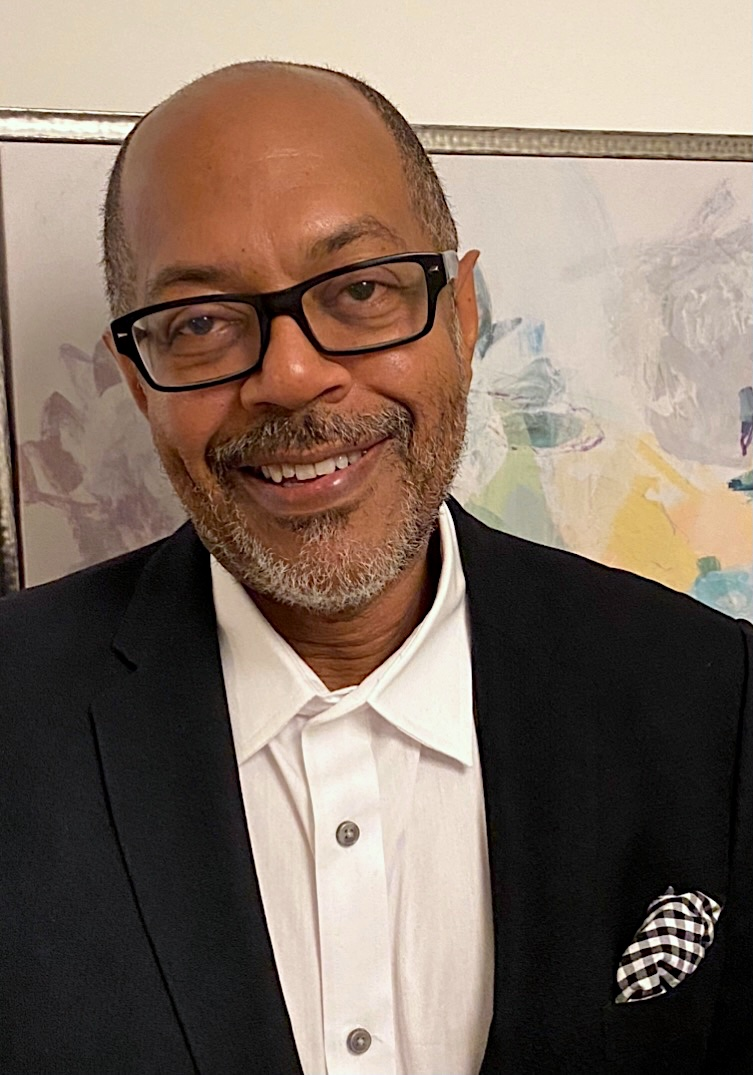
- Merida in 2021
- Born: January 17, 1957 (age 69); Wichita, Kansas, U.S.
- Education: Boston University (BS); University of California, Berkeley
- Occupations: Executive editor, Los Angeles Times
- Spouse: Donna Britt (m. 1992)
- Children: 3, including Darrell Britt-Gibson

Kevin Merida (born January 17, 1957) is an American journalist and author. He formerly served as executive editor at the Los Angeles Times, where he oversaw and coordinated all news gathering operations, including city and national desks, Sports and Features departments, Times Community News and Los Angeles Times en Español.

Prior to joining the Times, Merida was a ESPN senior VP and editor-in-chief. He supervised the creation and launch in May 2016 of The Undefeated (rebranded as "Andscape" in 2022). A multimedia platform that explores the intersections of race, sports and culture, editor in chief Merida expanded The Undefeated brand across The Walt Disney Company, with a content portfolio encompassing journalism, documentaries and television specials, albums, music videos, live events, digital talk shows and two bestselling children’s books.

During his tenure at ESPN, Merida oversaw the investigative/news enterprise unit, the television shows “E:60” and “Outside the Lines.” He chaired ESPN’s editorial board.

== Early life and education ==
Kevin Merida was born in Wichita, Kansas, and raised in the Washington, D.C., area. He is the eldest of two children born to the late Jesse Merida, a geologist and paleontologist employed with the United States Geological Survey and Smithsonian Institution. His mother, Doris, (née Ewell) worked as a communications specialist and FOIA officer for the National Science Foundation.

Merida attended Crossland High School, among the first group of children in the U.S. to be bused under a 1971 Supreme Court ruling. He graduated from Boston University. After graduating, he attended the University of California, Berkeley's "Summer Program for Minority Journalists."

== Career ==
Merida's journalistic and research focus generally involves biographies about "difficult subjects," as described by the Houston Institute for Race & Justice. He has covered biographical subjects like Strom Thurmond, Bob Dole, George W. Bush, and Newt Gingrich.

Merida began his journalism career at the Milwaukee Journal. He served as a general assignments reporter and rotating city desk editor from 1979 to 1983.

In 1983, Merida was recruited by the Dallas Morning News, where he initially worked as a special projects reporter and local political writer. He was later promoted to Washington-based national correspondent and White House correspondent covering the George H.W. Bush presidency. He concluded his tenure at the paper as assistant managing editor in charge of foreign and national news coverage. At those newspapers, he wrote about crime and society.

=== The Washington Post ===
He was hired by The Washington Post in 1993. During his 22-year career at the paper, Merida served as a congressional correspondent, national political reporter, longform feature writer, magazine columnist and senior editor in several roles. He was the coordinating editor of the Post’s yearlong 2006 series, “Being a Black Man," which was featured in the newspaper. The series earned a Peabody Award for increasing “our ability to understand the old issues in new ways,” and for its “melding of old and new forms of journalism and pointing to the future of electronic communication.”

In 2008, Merida became Assistant Managing Editor at The Washington Post for the paper's United States national news department. He led the national staff for four years during the Obama presidency. Merida co-authored 'Supreme Discomfort: The Divided Soul of Clarence Thomas, about Clarence Thomas, with Michael A. Fletcher. He teamed with Deborah Willis in 2008 to co-author the bestselling hardcover photo book, Obama, the Historic Campaign in Photographs.

He was named managing editor, "responsible for news and features coverage as well as the Universal News Desk," on February 4, 2013. During his tenure in that position, he helped lead the newspaper to four Pulitzer Prizes. He was instrumental in revamping the Post’s digital presence, transforming the paper’s website into one of the world’s top-ranked online news journals.

=== The Los Angeles Times ===
After a six-month search, The Los Angeles Times announced on Monday, May 3, 2021 that it had selected Merida to be executive editor of the publication. In January 2024, it was announced that Merida would step down from his role at The Los Angeles Times, with owner Patrick Soon-Shiong later stating he fired Merida in an interview with Tucker Carlson in March 2025.

== Awards and board memberships ==
Merida serves on the boards of the Pulitzer Prizes, and the Boston University Board of Trustees. In addition, he sits on the boards of the Kaiser Family Foundation, the Maynard Institute for Journalism Education, the Philip Merrill College of Journalism and the Wallace House at the University of Michigan.

In 2020, Merida was named to the Dean’s Advisory Council at the Gwen Ifill School of Media, Humanities and Social Sciences, Simmons University.

Merida was part of a 1990 Dallas Morning News team that was named a Pulitzer Prize finalist in explanatory journalism for a special report on the world’s “hidden wars.”

In 2025, Merida served as a judge for that year's American Mosaic Journalism Prize.

=== Awards and honors ===
- 1990, Pulitzer Prize finalist
- 2000, Journalist of the Year, National Association of Black Journalists
- 2005, Distinguished Alumni Award from Boston University’s College of Journalism.
- 2006, Vernon Jarrett Award for Journalistic Excellence
- 2018, Missouri Honors Medal for Distinguished Service in Journalism Missouri School of Journalism
- 2020, NABJ Chuck Stone Lifetime Achievement Award.

== Personal life ==
Merida lives in Los Angeles with his wife, journalist, author and former Washington Post columnist Donna Britt. In 2012, The Huffington Post named the couple one of the "Black Voices Power Couples" of the year. He has one son—Skye—with Donna Briit; and is stepfather to her sons Justin Britt-Gibson and actor Darrell Britt-Gibson.

== Bibliography ==
- Merida, Kevin. Being a Black Man: At the Corner of Progress and Peril. New York: Public Affairs (2007). ISBN 1586485229
- Merida, Kevin and Deborah Willis. Obama: The Historic Campaign in Photographs. New York: Amistad (2008). ISBN 0061733091
- Merida, Kevin and Michael Fletcher. Supreme Discomfort: The Divided Soul of Clarence Thomas. New York: Broadway (2008). ISBN 0767916360
