= Teen Choice Award for Choice TV Actress Comedy =

Entertainment award category

The following is a list of the Teen Choice Award winners and nominees for Choice TV Actress - Comedy. Lea Michele receives the most wins with four.

== Winners and nominees ==
=== 2000s ===
Year	Winner	Nominees	Ref.
2002	Jennifer Aniston – Friends	Courteney Cox – Friends; Jane Kaczmarek – Malcolm in the Middle; Lisa Kudrow – Friends; Mila Kunis – That '70s Show; Debra Messing – Will & Grace; Megan Mullally – Will & Grace; Laura Prepon – That '70s Show	
2003	Jennifer Aniston – Friends	Amanda Bynes – What I Like About You; Sarah Chalke – Scrubs; Courteney Cox – Friends; Kaley Cuoco – 8 Simple Rules; Hilary Duff – Lizzie McGuire; Mila Kunis – That '70s Show; Wanda Sykes – Wanda at Large	
2004	Jennifer Aniston – Friends	Alexis Bledel – Gilmore Girls; Amanda Bynes – What I Like About You; Kaley Cuoco – 8 Simple Rules; Eve – Eve; Jennifer Freeman – My Wife and Kids; Mila Kunis – That '70s Show; Raven-Symoné – That's So Raven	
2005	Alexis Bledel – Gilmore Girls	Pamela Anderson – Stacked; Amanda Bynes – What I Like About You; Eve – Eve; JoAnna Garcia – Reba; Mila Kunis – That '70s Show; Eva Longoria – Desperate Housewives; Raven-Symoné – That's So Raven	
2006	Alexis Bledel – Gilmore Girls	Tichina Arnold – Everybody Hates Chris; Mila Kunis – That '70s Show; Eva Longoria – Desperate Housewives; Jaime Pressly – My Name Is Earl; Raven-Symoné – That's So Raven	
2007	Miley Cyrus – Hannah Montana	America Ferrera – Ugly Betty; Eva Longoria – Desperate Housewives; Tia Mowry – The Game; Emma Roberts – Unfabulous	
2008	Miley Cyrus – Hannah Montana	Christina Applegate – Samantha Who?; America Ferrera – Ugly Betty; Tina Fey – 30 Rock; Jaime Pressly – My Name Is Earl	
2009	Miley Cyrus – Hannah Montana	Miranda Cosgrove – iCarly; America Ferrera – Ugly Betty; Jenna Fischer – The Office; Eva Longoria – Desperate Housewives	

=== 2010s ===
Year	Winner	Nominees	Ref.
2010	Selena Gomez – Wizards of Waverly Place	Miranda Cosgrove – iCarly; Kaley Cuoco – The Big Bang Theory; Demi Lovato – Sonny with a Chance; Lea Michele – Glee	
2011	Selena Gomez – Wizards of Waverly Place	Miranda Cosgrove – iCarly; Kaley Cuoco – The Big Bang Theory; Miley Cyrus – Hannah Montana; Demi Lovato – Sonny with a Chance	
2012	Lea Michele – Glee	Miranda Cosgrove – iCarly; Kaley Cuoco – The Big Bang Theory; Zooey Deschanel – New Girl; Sofía Vergara – Modern Family	
2013	Lea Michele – Glee	Kaley Cuoco – The Big Bang Theory; Zooey Deschanel – New Girl; Mindy Kaling – The Mindy Project; Bridgit Mendler – Good Luck Charlie	
2014	Lea Michele – Glee	Kaley Cuoco – The Big Bang Theory; Mindy Kaling – The Mindy Project; Laura Marano – Austin & Ally; Debby Ryan – Jessie	
2015	Lea Michele – Glee	Dove Cameron – Liv and Maddie; Kaley Cuoco – The Big Bang Theory; Emily Osment – Young & Hungry; Gina Rodriguez – Jane the Virgin; Zendaya – K.C. Undercover	
2016	Candace Cameron Bure – Fuller House	Dove Cameron – Liv and Maddie; Laura Marano – Austin & Ally; Lea Michele – Scream Queens; Emma Roberts – Scream Queens; Gina Rodriguez – Jane the Virgin	
2017	Candace Cameron Bure – Fuller House	Rose McIver – iZombie; Emma Roberts – Scream Queens; Gina Rodriguez – Jane the Virgin; Yara Shahidi – Black-ish; Zendaya – K.C. Undercover	
2018	Gina Rodriguez – Jane the Virgin	Kristen Bell – The Good Place; Candace Cameron Bure – Fuller House; America Ferrera – Superstore; Sarah Hyland – Modern Family; Yara Shahidi – Black-ish & Grown-ish	
2019	Nina Dobrev – Fam	Candace Cameron Bure – Fuller House; Kaley Cuoco – The Big Bang Theory; Sarah Hyland – Modern Family; Gina Rodriguez – Jane the Virgin; Yara Shahidi – Black-ish & Grown-ish	
