= Donna Britt (writer) =

American writer

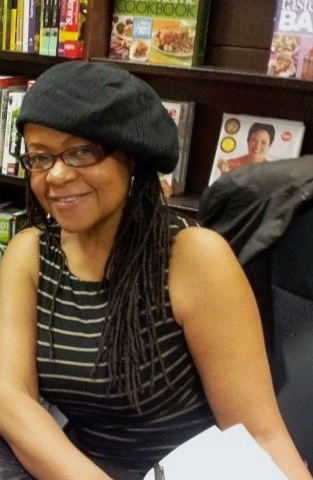
- Britt in 2012
- Born: Donna Marie Britt; January 1, 1954 (age 72); Gary, Indiana, U.S.
- Education: Hampton University (BA); University of Michigan (MA)
- Spouse: Kevin Merida (m. 1992)
- Children: 3, including Darrell Britt-Gibson

Donna Marie Britt (born 1 January 1954) is an American author and former syndicated newspaper columnist, reporter and critic. Her first book, Brothers (& me): A Memoir of Loving and Giving, was published in 2011 by Little, Brown and Company.

== Early life and education ==
Britt was born and raised in Gary, Indiana. Her father, Thomas, was a construction worker, and her mother, Geraldine, was an insurance salesperson and recruiter for the state of Indiana. Britt graduated from West Side High School in Gary, and later earned a Bachelor of Arts degree in film from Hampton University.

In 1977, while studying for her master's degree at the University of Michigan, Britt's 26-year-old older brother Darrell was shot and killed by two Gary, Indiana police officers under suspicious circumstances. She later wrote extensively about the incident and its impact on her family.

== Career ==
Britt launched her journalism career at the Detroit Free Press in 1980 where she worked as a general assignment reporter, features writer and fashion columnist. A former editor and film critic for USA Today, she joined The Washington Post in 1989, earning acclaim as an op-ed columnist and writing frequently about social, cultural and racial issues. Her weekly column ran in newspapers in more than 60 cities and was syndicated by the Washington Post Writer's Group.

Britt's 2011 book, Brothers (& me): a Memoir of Loving and Giving was honored by O: The Oprah Magazine as one of January 2012's "Ten Titles to Pick Up Now," and excerpted that same month by Essence magazine.

== Personal life ==
Britt is married to author and Los Angeles Times executive editor, Kevin Merida. Merida formerly was editor at The Washington Post, where he worked for twenty-two years. In 2012, Britt and Merida ranked seventh on the list of African American power couples compiled by HuffPost. They have three sons: Justin Britt-Gibson and Darrell Britt-Gibson (from Britt's first marriage), and Skye Merida.

A well-being and meditation enthusiast, Britt has instructed yoga since 2004.

== Honors and awards ==
Britt has earned numerous awards, including top honors from the National Association of Black Journalists, The American Association of Sunday and Feature Editors, and the American Society of Newspaper Editors.
