= Andrew Leeds (actor) =

American actor (born 1981)

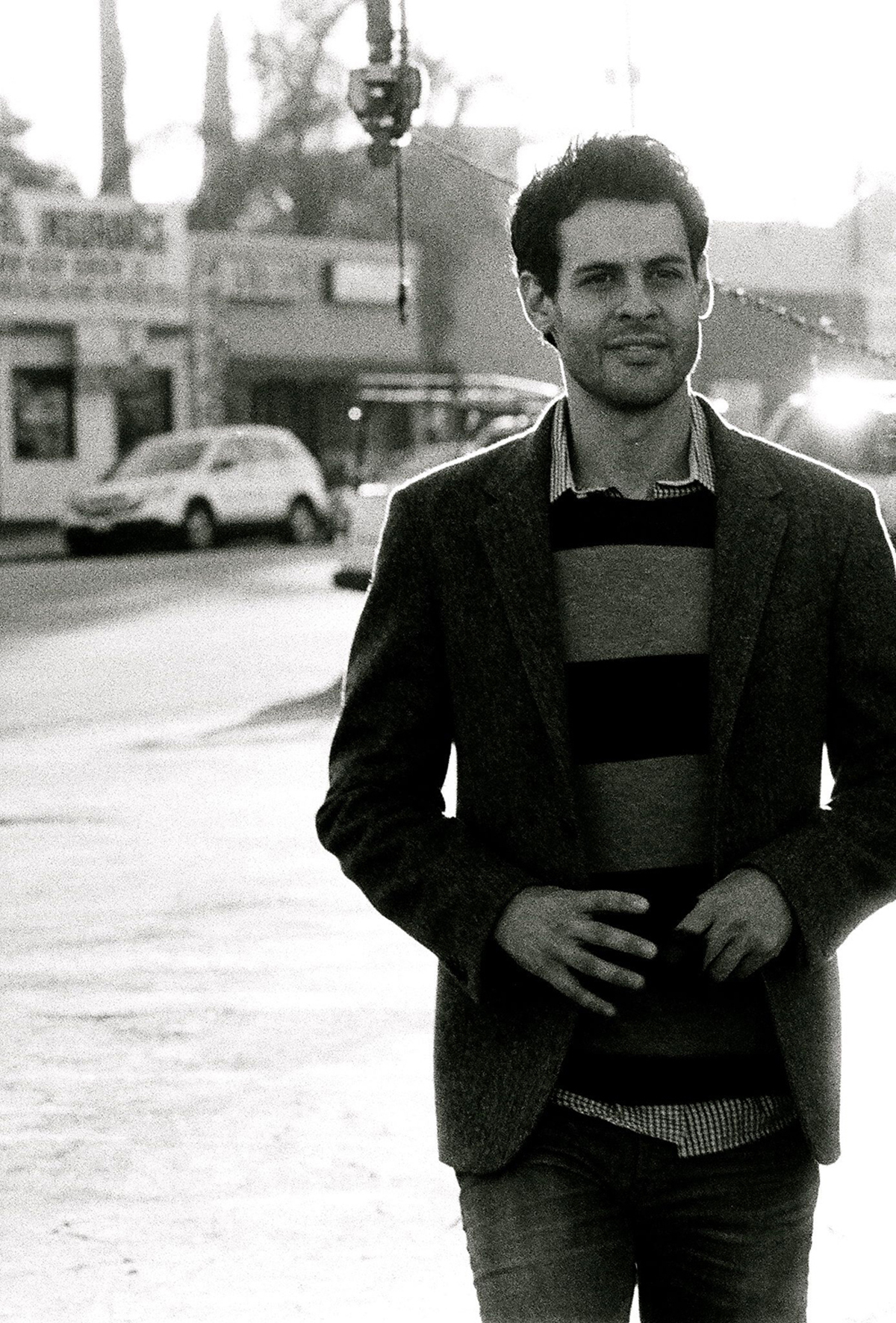
- Leeds in March 2016
- Born: Andrew Harrison Leeds; September 24, 1981 (age 44); Tarpon Springs, Florida
- Education: Stanford University (BS)
- Occupation: Actor
- Years active: 1995–present

Andrew Harrison Leeds (born September 24, 1981) is an American actor. He is known for his portrayal of Josh on Cristela, Christopher Pelant on Bones, and David Clarke on Zoey's Extraordinary Playlist. He is also in the Main Company of the sketch comedy/improv theater The Groundlings.

== Early life and education ==
Andrew Harrison Leeds was born on September 24, 1981, in Tarpon Springs, Florida.

While at Stanford University, Leeds participated in theatrical productions on campus. He graduated with a degree in computer science.

== Career ==
Leeds' first job as a professional actor was at the age of eight as an understudy in the Broadway musical Teddy & Alice. Eventually, Leeds took over the role of Quentin Roosevelt.

Leeds then originated the role of Gavroche in the national tour of Les Miserables. After leaving Les Miserables, Leeds appeared in the Broadway production of Falsettos playing the role of Jason on Wednesday and Saturday matinees. He starred in the musical for a year, acting opposite such Broadway legends as Michael Rupert, Chip Zien, and Mandy Patinkin. After taking over the evening performances for a short stint, Leeds departed the production to play the title role in Carly Simon's opera Romulus Hunt.

Leeds appeared in the movie A Pig's Tale produced by Polygram Filmed Entertainment and as Cadet Dotson in Major Payne starring Damon Wayans.

Leeds and his writing partner at the time, David Lampson, were selected to be on the Bravo reality show Situation: Comedy. Produced by Sean Hayes, the show documented the process of making two competing pilots. Leeds and Lampson's pilot, Stephen's Life, was selected out of 10,000 submissions. The pilot was shot for NBC and went on to win the competition, launching Leeds' career as a writer. Leeds then returned to his acting career and appeared on Veep and It's Always Sunny in Philadelphia.

His drama pilot Rex Is Not Your Lawyer was produced by NBC in 2011. Leeds and Lampson then wrote another television pilot, a comedy for NBC called Brenda Forever, but it was not ordered for a full series. Leeds was later cast in a regular role as Josh in the ABC comedy Cristela.

Leeds then wrote a comedy pilot called Those People for Kelly Ripa's company and ABC and appeared on the Comedy Central show Workaholics. In November 2015, Leeds became a member of the Main Company of the sketch comedy/improv troupe The Groundlings. As of June 2026, he remains a member.

== Filmography ==
=== Film ===
Year	Title	Role	Notes
1993	Life with Mikey	Fred	Uncredited
1995	Major Payne	Private Dotson	
2003	Missing Brendan	Older Bob Calden	
2006	Special	Grocery Store Patron	
2006	Fanaa		
2009	Irene In Time	Marcus	
2011	Subject: I Love You	Chris	
2015	Entourage	Paul	
2016	Office Christmas Party	Tim	
2017	The Golden Age	Morgan Winslow	
2021	Zoey's Extraordinary Christmas	David Clarke	
2022	A Lot of Nothing	Ted	
2026	Ugly Cry		

=== Television ===
Year	Title	Role	Notes
1994	Aaahh!!! Real Monsters	Jake	Episode: "The Switching Hour" (voice)
2002	Nancy Drew	Newspaper Kid	Television film
2003	CSI: Crime Scene Investigation	Tom Bell	Episode: "All for Our Country"
2003	The Practice	Danny Grant	2 episodes
2003–2004	Nip/Tuck	Henry Shapiro	3 episodes
2004	I'm with Her	Joel	Episode: "Drama Queen"
2006	Numb3rs	Daniel	Episode: "Backscatter"
2008	Dirt	Alan	3 episodes
2008	Desperate Housewives	Leo	Episode: "Kids Ain't Like Everybody Else"
2009	House	Dr. Medina	Episode: "Broken"
2010	The Mentalist	Drew Yost	Episode: "Red Sky at Night"
2010	Castle	Adam Murphy	Episode: "Punked"
2011	The Closer	Conner Ellis	Episode: "Home Improvement"
2011	Rules of Engagement	Lester	Episode: "Audrey is Dumb"
2012	Grey's Anatomy	Andy	Episode: "Second Opinion"
2012–15	Bones	Christopher Pelant	Recurring role (9 episodes)
2013	Cult	Marc Segal	2 episodes
2013	The Fosters	ADA Colbert	Episode: "I Do"
2013	American Horror Story	Dr. Dunphy	Episode: "The Axeman Cometh"
2013–2014	NCIS: Los Angeles	John Booker	Recurring role (4 episodes)
2014	Mixology	Cute guy	Episode: "Bruce & Fab"
2014	Veep	Jackson	Episode: "Debate"
2014	Bad Teacher	Ned	Episode: "Divorced Dudes"
2014	Hot in Cleveland	Tom	Episode: "The Italian Job"
2015	It's Always Sunny in Philadelphia	Jason	Episode: "The Gang Misses the Boat"
2014–2015	Cristela	Josh	Main cast (22 episodes)
2016	Workaholics	Dan	Episode: "A Night at the Dudeseum"
2016	Modern Family	Rich	Episode: "Double Click"
2016	Shameless	Micah	Episode: "The Defenestration of Frank"
2017	The Great Indoors	Paul	Recurring role (6 Episodes)
2018	Lucifer	Joel	Episode: "The Last Heartbreak"
2018	Silicon Valley	Duncan	Episode: "Grow Fast or Die Slow"
2018	Nobodies	Andrew	Episode: "Alone Star State"
2018–19	Get Shorty	Ken Stevenson	Recurring role (10 episodes)
2019	The Morning Show	Alan	Episode: "In the Dark Night of the Soul It's Always 3:30 in the Morning"
2019–2023	Barry	Leo Cousineau	Recurring role (12 episodes)
2020	One Day at a Time	Bryce	Episode: "Penny Pinching"
2020–2021	Zoey's Extraordinary Playlist	David Clarke	Recurring role/main cast (24 episodes)
2020–2022	A Million Little Things	Peter Benoit	Recurring role (12 episodes)
2021	Why Women Kill	Dr. Andrews	Episode: "The Lady Confesses"
2021–2022	The Conners	Nick	Recurring role (3 episodes)
2022	The Dropout	Roland	Episode: "Old White Men"
2022	Love, Victor	Dr. Richards	Episode: "You Up?"
2022	The Goldbergs	Duane	2 episodes
2022	The Patient	Ezra	Main cast (10 episodes)
2022–2025	Ghosts	Eric	Recurring role (4 episodes)
2024	Frasier	Terry	Episode: "All About Eve"
TBA	The People v. Gorilla Grodd	TBA	Filming
