= Paula Newsome =

American actress

- Born: October 7, 1961 (age 65)
- Education: Webster University
- Occupation: Actress
- Years active: 1990–present
- Known for: Spider-Man: No Way Home; CSI: Vegas

Paula Newsome (born October 7, 1961) is an American actress. She starred in a number of television series, most notably in the ABC police drama Women's Murder Club (2007–08), and had recurring roles on NYPD Blue, NCIS, Barry, and Chicago Med. She is best known for her supporting role in the film Spider-Man: No Way Home (2021), and her leading role of Maxine "Max" Roby in the CBS crime drama series CSI: Vegas (2021–2024).

== Early life ==
Newsome grew up on Chicago's South Side, residing in Chatham and attending Howalton Day School and later Morgan Park Academy. She received a bachelor's degree from Webster University’s Conservatory of Theater Arts.

== Career ==
Newsome began having an interest in acting as a child performing in community theater, before moving to New York City. While in New York, she was cast in a number of Broadway productions. She made her big screen debut appearing in a supporting role in the 1992 comedy film Straight Talk starring Dolly Parton. She went on to guest star in a number of notable television series, include Chicago Hope, Law & Order, Ally McBeal, Dharma & Greg, NYPD Blue, ER, Heroes, and Criminal Minds. In film, Newsome has appeared in Guess Who (2005), Little Miss Sunshine (2006), Reign Over Me (2007), Things We Lost in the Fire (2007), Thinspiration (2014), Black or White (2014) and Spider-Man: No Way Home (2021).

Newsome was a regular cast member in a number of short-lived television series. First, she co-starred alongside Mark Feuerstein and Lauren Graham in the NBC sitcom Conrad Bloom (1998). In 2003, she appeared in the NBC legal drama The Lyon's Den starring Rob Lowe. From 2007 to 2008, she starred alongside Angie Harmon, Laura Harris and Aubrey Dollar in the ABC police drama Women's Murder Club playing medical examiner Claire Washburn. The following years, she returned to playing guest-starring roles, appearing on The New Adventures of Old Christine, Bones, Parenthood, FlashForward, Drop Dead Diva, Grey's Anatomy, Suits, Castle, and most notably How to Get Away with Murder opposite Viola Davis, for which she received positive reviews. She also had recurring roles on City of Angels, NCIS, and Suburgatory. In 2018 she appeared as Detective Moss in the first season of HBO's Barry. In her Hello! magazine interview she said: "My life took a huge turn after the HBO comedy Barry because Hollywood saw this show where I was allowed to play a role that I absolutely loved; Detective Janice Moss was funny, she was poignant, and finally Hollywood was like, Wait a minute, get her, get her! But I'd been doing that work for years!" In 2019, Newsome appeared in 12 episodes of Chicago Med as Caroline Charles, ex-wife of Dr. Daniel Charles, Chief of Psychiatry, and mother of Robin Charles. She also played Jackie Vance in the CBS series NCIS from 2009-2013.

In 2021, Newsome was cast in the leading role of Maxine "Max" Roby in the CBS crime drama series, CSI: Vegas. The series was canceled after three seasons in 2024.

== Filmography ==
=== Film ===
Year	Title	Role	Notes
1990	Home Alone	Shopper	Deleted Scene
1992	Straight Talk	Ellen	
2005	Guess Who	Darlene	
2006	Little Miss Sunshine	Linda	
2007	Reign Over Me	Melanie	
2007	Things We Lost in the Fire	Diane	
2014	Black or White	Judge Margaret Cummins	
2021	Spider-Man: No Way Home	MIT Assistant Vice Chancellor	

=== Television ===
Year	Title	Role	Notes
1992	Keeper of the City	Receptionist	Television film
1996	Swift Justice	Ada Pierce	Episode: "Pilot"
1998	Law & Order	Carol Mallon	Episode: "Carrier"
1998	Conrad Bloom	Faye Reynolds	Main role, 13 episodes
1999	Chicago Hope	Michelle Corwin / Kathy Stalworth	2 episodes
1999	Ally McBeal	Phyllis Butters	Episode: "Buried Pleasures"
2000	Dharma & Greg	Charlene	Episode: "Weekend at Larry's"
2000	ER	Rehab Receptionist Margaret	Episode: "Homecoming"
2000	City of Angels	Dr. Helen Chanley	3 episodes
2001	First Years	Alyse	Episode: "Porn in the U.S.A."
2001	Judging Amy	Ms. Pitt	Episode: "Nobody Expects the Spanish Exquisition"
2002, 2004	The Guardian	Angela / James Mooney's Sister	2 episodes
2003	The Lyon's Den	Kathy Wolf	Recurring role, 8 episodes
2003–2004	NYPD Blue	Tammy Carlyle	3 episodes
2004	Friends	Stewardess/Flight Attendant	2 episodes (1 uncredited)
2005	Yes, Dear	Donna	Episode: "The New Neighbors"
2005	Killer Instinct	Mrs. Cavanagh	2 episodes
2005	Night Stalker	Dr. Lawrence	Episode: "Malum"
2005	Criminal Minds	Detective Shea Clavin	Episode: "L.D.S.K."
2007	Heroes	Dr. Witherson	2 episodes
2007–2008	Women's Murder Club	Dr. Claire Washburn	Main role, 13 episodes
2009	The New Adventures of Old Christine	Principal Diane Slater	Episode: "Hair"
2009	Bones	Kelly Bissette	Episode: "The Beautiful Day in the Neighborhood"
2009–2013	NCIS	Jackie Vance	4 episodes
2010	FlashForward	Dr. Callie Langer	Episode: "Revelation Zero: Part 1"
2010	Drop Dead Diva	Wanda Williams	Episode: "Would I Lie to You?"
2010–2011	Parenthood	Dr. Robertson	2 episodes
2011	Grey's Anatomy	Mrs. Sturgeon	Episode: "Disarm"
2011	Pretty Little Liars	Coach Fulton	2 episodes
2011	Suits	Lucille Jackson	Episode: "Identity Crisis"
2012	1600 Penn	Atlanta Weaver	Episode: "Putting Out Fires"
2012–2014	Suburgatory	Tracy	4 episodes
2015	Cougar Town	Principal Shore	Episode: "Even the Losers"
2015	Backstrom	Jill Chapin	Episode: "Inescapable Truth"
2015	Castle	Debbie Parker	2 episodes (1 uncredited)
2016	How to Get Away with Murder	Joyce Robinson	Episode: "She Hates Us"
2016	Code Black	Margaret Wesley	Episode: "Blood Sport"
2016–2017	No Tomorrow	Tyra DeNeil Fields	3 episodes
2016–2017	Transparent	Dr. Leona Gunderson	3 episodes
2017	Doubt	Talia Mendez	Episode: "Then and Now"
2018–2019	Barry	Detective Janice Moss	Recurring role, 9 episodes Nominated — Screen Actors Guild Award for Outstanding Performance by an Ensemble in a Comedy Series
2019	Boomerang	Victoria Jackson	2 episodes
2019	Chicago Med	Caroline Charles	Recurring role, 12 episodes
2019	Magnum P.I.	Brianna Healy	Episode: "Murder is Never Quiet"
2020	The Unicorn	Vanessa	Episode: "Everyone's a Winner"
2020	The Twilight Zone	Pastor Nichelle Del Rio	Episode: "A Small Town"
2021–2024	CSI: Vegas	Maxine "Max" Roby	Main role
