= Darrell Britt-Gibson =

American actor

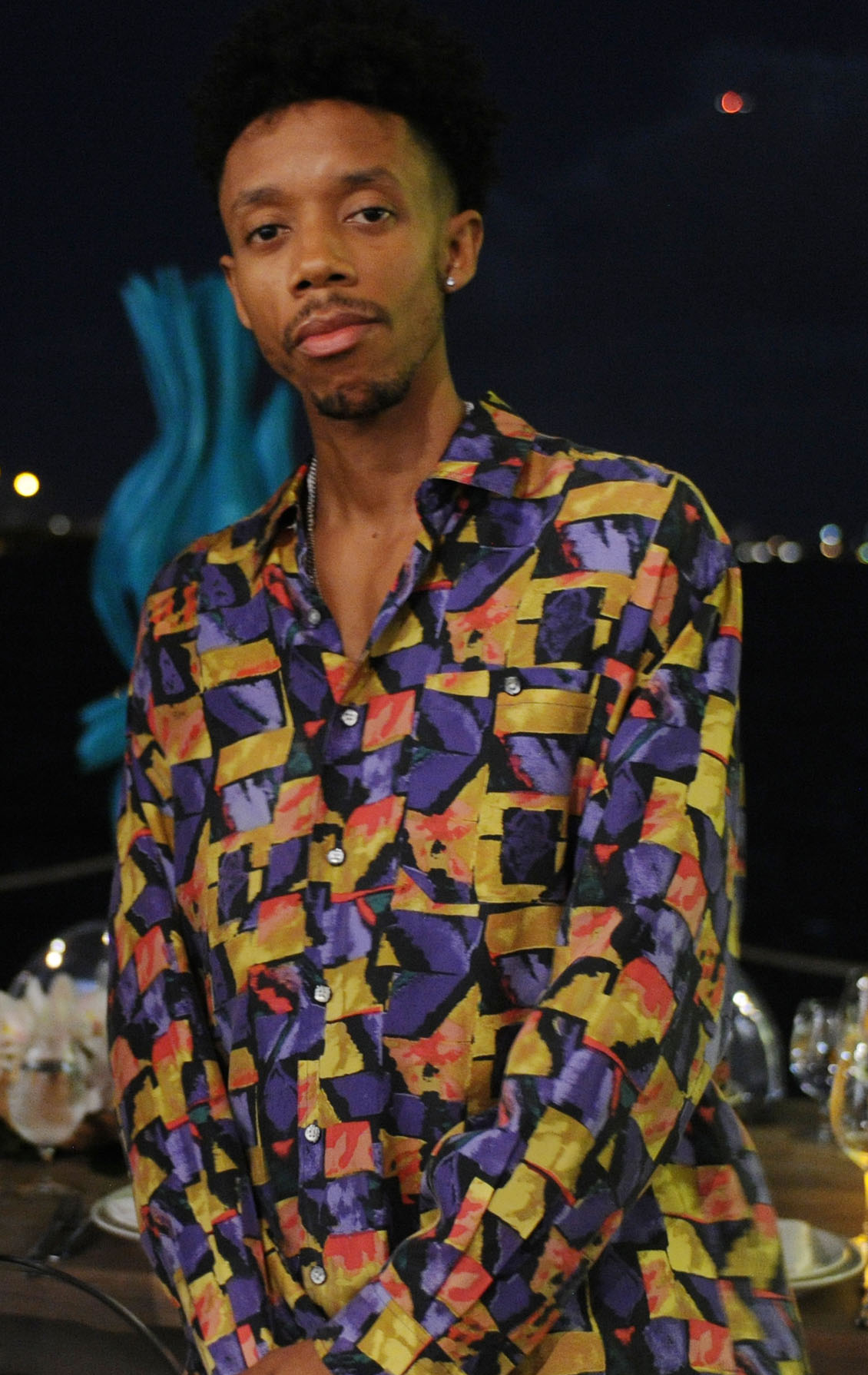
- Britt-Gibson at the Miami International Film Festival in October 2016
- Born: Darrell Hadari Britt-Gibson; Silver Spring, Maryland, U.S.
- Occupation: Actor
- Years active: 2006–present

Darrell Hadari Britt-Gibson is an American actor, known for his role as Darius "O-Dog" Hill on the HBO series The Wire along with his role as “Bishop” on the HBO series Euphoria. He has also appeared on the Showtime series Californication, the Starz series Power, the FX series You're the Worst, and the HBO series Barry and We Own This City. He has also starred in the films Keanu (2016), 20th Century Women (2016), Three Billboards Outside Ebbing, Missouri (2017), and Judas and the Black Messiah (2021).

== Early life ==
Britt-Gibson was born in Detroit, Michigan and raised in Silver Spring, Maryland. He is the son of author and journalist Donna Britt and her first husband, Greg Gibson. Britt-Gibson has one older brother, Justin Britt-Gibson, a screenwriter, and one younger half-brother, Skye Merida, from his mother's remarriage to newspaper editor Kevin Merida. He attended Hampton University and thereafter transferred to the University of Maryland, Baltimore County, where he studied theater.

== Career ==
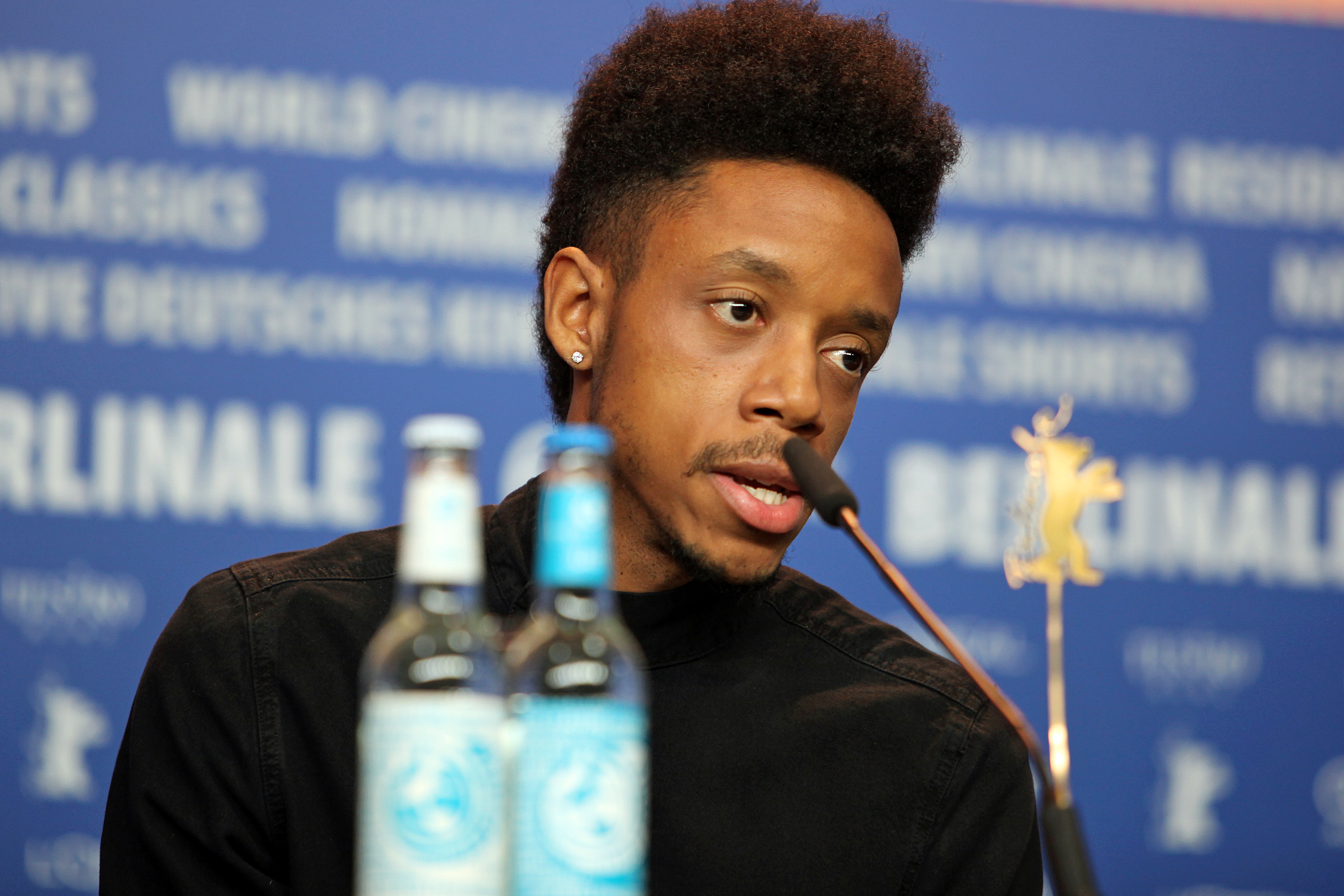
Britt-Gibson at the Berlin International Film Festival in February 2016

Britt-Gibson made his acting debut in the recurring role of Darius "O-Dog" Hill on HBO's crime drama television series The Wire, starring in 8 episodes from 2006 to 2008. He then appeared in the film Toe to Toe (2009) as Leron, and 2 episodes of the web series Monday Wednesday Friday, also writing one of the episodes in which he starred. He has also guest starred in episodes of many television series, such as Southland, Shameless, The Bridge, and Major Crimes.

In 2014, Britt-Gibson had recurring roles on the series Californication as Darrell, Power as Rolla, and You're the Worst as Shitstain. Britt-Gibson was cast in the pilot of ABC's crime drama series Wicked City in the role of Diver Hawkes, but was subsequently recast after the pilot was ordered to series. In 2016, he co-starred in the comedy film Keanu, portraying the role of Trunk.

== Filmography ==
=== Film ===
Year	Title	Role	Notes
2009	Toe to Toe	Leron	
2012	Man vs. Automated Phone System	Man	Short film; also producer
2013	"Brotherman"	Brotherman	Short film shot on location in Watts, Los Angeles
2013	W.M.D.	Other Guy	
2014	Squatters	Teen #2	
2016	Soy Nero	Private Compton	
2016	Keanu	Trunk	
2016	20th Century Women	Julian	Nominated – Critics' Choice Movie Award for Best Acting Ensemble; Nominated – Washington D.C. Area Film Critics Association Award for Best Ensemble
2017	Three Billboards Outside Ebbing, Missouri	Jerome	Critics' Choice Movie Award for Best Acting Ensemble; Washington D.C. Area Film Critics Association Award for Best Ensemble; Nominated – Detroit Film Critics Society Award for Best Ensemble
2018	The Unicorn	Charlie	
2019	Just Mercy	Darnell Houston	
2021	Judas and the Black Messiah	Bobby Rush	
2021	Silk Road	Rayford	
2021	Fear Street Part One: 1994	Martin P. Franklin	
2021	Fear Street Part Three: 1666	Martin P. Franklin	
2024	She Taught Love	Frank Cooper	also screenwriter

=== Television ===
Year	Title	Role	Notes
2006–2008	The Wire	Darius "O-Dog" Hill	8 episodes
2011	Monday Wednesday Friday	Darrell	2 episodes; also writer
2012	Southland	Kid	Episode: "God's Work"
2013	Shameless	Nick	Episode: "Cascading Failures"
2013	Uproxx Video	Lenny Bailor	3 episodes
2013	The Bridge	Waiter	Episode: "The Beetle"
2013	Major Crimes	Shorty Wallace	Episode: "Risk Assessment"
2014	Californication	Darrell	6 episodes
2014	Power	Rolla	4 episodes
2014–2017	You're the Worst	Dale "Shitstain"	17 episodes
2017	Powerless	Anton	Episode: "Cold Season"
2018	Get Shorty	Moises	8 Episodes in Season 2
2018–2023	Barry	Jermaine	16 episodes
2022	We Own This City	Jemell Rayam	6 episodes
2026	Euphoria	Bishop	7 episodes
