= Kirby Howell-Baptiste =

British actress (born 1987)

- Born: 23 October 1987 (age 39); London, England
- Occupation: Actress
- Years active: 2008–present

Kirby Howell-Baptiste (born 23 October 1987), credited mononymously as Kirby from 2023 onwards, is an English actress. She has appeared as a series regular on Downward Dog (2017), Killing Eve (2018), Why Women Kill (2019), Sugar (2024), and as Death of the Endless in The Sandman (2022–2025) and Dead Boy Detectives (2024).

Her television appearances also include recurring roles on Love (2016–2018), Barry (2018–2023), The Good Place (2018–2020), and the fourth season of Veronica Mars (2019), with voice roles in Infinity Train (2020) and Splinter Cell: Deathwatch (2025).

== Early life and education ==
Kirby is from London and of Jamaican descent. Her mother owned clothing stalls in Camden. Kirby began acting at the Anna Scher Theatre.

== Career ==
Kirby's acting career has included many appearances in guest and recurring television series roles, in addition to several short and feature-length films. Her earlier television work includes the IFC sketch comedy series Comedy Bang! Bang! and the Showtime series House of Lies. She was also a series regular in the short-lived ABC series Downward Dog in 2017. Kirby followed in 2018 with her role as Elena in the first season of the BBC series Killing Eve. She had a recurring role as actress Sasha Baxter in the HBO comedy-drama series Barry, and has appeared as neuroscientist Simone Garnett in the third and fourth seasons of the NBC series The Good Place. On streaming television platforms, Kirby has had recurring roles on the Netflix series Love and the fourth season of Veronica Mars for Hulu, and appeared in the main cast of the CBS All Access series Why Women Kill for its first season. She booked the role of Anita Darling in Disney's Cruella in 2021. Originally credited by her full name, Kirby has been credited mononymously since 2023. However, she continues to be credited as Kirby Howell-Baptiste in the second season of The Sandman.

== Filmography ==
=== Film ===
Key
†	Denotes films that have not yet been released

Year	Title	Role	Notes	Ref.
2011	Prepping Keisha	Keisha James	Short	
2012	How to Succeed with Women	Unknown	Short	
2012	Invasion of the Les-Body Snatchers	Emma	Short	
2013	Lucky Day	Carly	Short; also director, producer & writer	
2013	We Four Queens	Samantha	Short	
2014	Thanks for the Ride	Kirby	Video short	
2014	Minor Alterations	Ruby	Short; also producer & writer	
2015	Textbook Adulthood	Lady Jerk		
2016	Nell Live: Still Tayin' Around	Moviegoer	Short	
2016	The Hip Hooray	Kirby	Short	
2016	Solar	Mystic voice (voice)	Short	
2017	A Dog's Purpose	Maya		
2017	A Dog's Purpose: Lights, Camera, Woof	Herself	Video short	
2017	Lane Woods Finds Love	Unknown		
2018	It's a Party	Hannah		
2018	Find Me	Jordan		
2021	Happily	Maude		
2021	Cruella	Anita "Tattletale" Darling		
2021	Queenpins	JoJo Johnson		
2021	Silent Night	Alex		
2022	Catwoman: Hunted	Barbara Minerva / Cheetah (voice)	Direct-to-video	
2022	Mr. Harrigan's Phone	Ms. Hart		
2023	The Magician's Elephant	The Countess (voice)		
2024	We Strangers	Ray Martin		
2026	Club Kid	Edison		
TBA	Transcending †		Post-production	
TBA	Ibelin †		Filming	

=== Television ===
Year	Title	Role	Notes
2008	Holby City	Sick Patient	Episode: "You're So Vain"; uncredited
2012	AMC Fearfest	Angelique Kumari	Television special
2014	CollegeHumor Originals	Brittany	Episode: "How America Is Like a Bad Boyfriend"
2014	Six Guys One Car	Christy / Keri	2 episodes
2014–2015	Comedy Bang! Bang!	Decaf Dame / Boom Operator	2 episodes
2014–2015	UCB Comedy Originals	Unknown	4 episodes
2015	House of Lies	Erin	Episode: "We Can Always Just Overwhelm the Vagus Nerve with Another Sensation"
2015	The Brat Cave	Office O'Neill / Kirby	2 episodes
2015	The King of 7B	Greta Milgrim	Television film
2016	The Dating Game	Evie	Episode: "AJ vs. The Truffle Butter Sex Act"
2016	The UCB Show	Unknown	2 episodes
2016	TripTank	Stylist / Wife (voice)	2 episodes
2016	Bajillion Dollar Propertie$	Rezecca	Episode: "Spiritual Gurus"
2016	Lady Time	Kathy	Miniseries
2016–2017	The Powerpuff Girls	Chelsea (voice)	2 episodes
2016–2018	Love	Beth	Recurring; 8 episodes
2017	@midnight	Herself	Episode #4.114
2017	Downward Dog	Jenn	Main role; 8 episodes
2017	Do You Want to See a Dead Body?	Flight Attendant	Episode: "A Body and a Plane" (with Alexandra Daddario)
2017	Dirtbags	Kind Neighbor	Episode: "Husband"
2018	Alone Together	Cassidy	Episode: "Sleepover"
2018	Pappy	Kiki	Episode: "Dad Dick"
2018	Big City Greens	Judge Uppinsbottom (voice)	Episode: "Tilly's Goat"
2018	Girls Code	Angela	Pilot
2018	Into the Dark	Kayla	Episode: "New Year, New You"
2018–2019	Drunk History	Herself	3 episodes
2018–2020	The Good Place	Simone Garnett	Recurring; 12 episodes
2018–2022	Killing Eve	Elena Felton	Main role (season 1), guest role (season 4); 8 episodes
2018–2023	Barry	Sasha Baxter	Recurring; 16 episodes
2019	Veronica Mars	Nicole Malloy	7 episodes
2019	Why Women Kill	Taylor Harding	Main role (10 episodes)
2020	Glitch Techs	Audrey (voice)	Episode: "I'm Mitch Williams"
2020	Infinity Train	Grace Monroe (voice)	13 episodes; recurring role (Book Two), main role (Book Three)
2020	Big Hero 6: The Series	Cobra (voice)	Episode: "Cobra and Mongoose"
2021	Waffles + Mochi	Pickler	Episode: "Pickles"
2021	Wolfboy and the Everything Factory	Flora (voice)	2 episodes
2021–2022	Hacks	Daisy	2 episodes
2021–2022	Jurassic World Camp Cretaceous	Dr. Mae Turner (voice)	Recurring (seasons 4–5); 16 episodes
2021–2022	Tig n' Seek	Octavia Spritz / various (voice)	6 episodes
2022	RuPaul's Drag Race: All Stars	Herself (guest judge)	Episode: "The Realness of Fortune Ball"
2022–2025	The Sandman	Death of the Endless	Recurring; 8 episodes
2023	Is It Cake?	Herself (guest judge)	Episode: "Cake University"
2023	Digman!	Nigella (voice)	Episode: "Shakespeare's Lost Sonnet"
2023	Scott Pilgrim Takes Off	Lucas's Agent / Actress in a Movie Within the Show (voice)	3 episodes
2023	Culprits	Officer	Recurring (billed as "Kirby")
2024	Sugar	Ruby	8 episodes (billed as "Kirby")
2024	Dead Boy Detectives	Death of the Endless	Episode: "The Case of Crystal Palace" (billed as "Kirby")
2025–present	Splinter Cell: Deathwatch	Zinnia McKenna	Voice
2025	Krapopolis	Viscera	Voice, recurring role (billed as "Kirby" in the first two appearances)
2026	The Night Manager	Dr. Kim Saunders	1 episode
2026	Sherwood	D.I. Zara Gill	
