= A nice meal =

"a nice meal"
- Barry episode
- Episode no.: Season 4 Episode 7
- Directed by: Bill Hader
- Written by: Liz Sarnoff
- Cinematography by: Carl Herse
- Editing by: Ali Greer
- Original air date: May 21, 2023
- Running time: 30 minutes

Guest appearances
- Fred Melamed as Tom Posorro; Charles Parnell as DA Buckner; Andrew Leeds as Leo Cousineau; Nate Corddry as "Matt Iserson"; Gary Kraus as Chief Krauss; Anthony Molinari as Shane Taylor; Tobie Windham as "Groove Tube" Damian; Andre Hyland as "Live Wire" Jason; Zachary Golinger as John

Episode chronology
← Previous "the wizard"	Next → "wow"

"a nice meal" is the seventh episode of the fourth season of the American crime tragicomedy television series Barry. It is the 31st episode overall and the penultimate episode of the series and was written by executive producer Liz Sarnoff and directed by series creator Bill Hader, who also serves as lead actor. It was first broadcast on HBO in the United States on May 21, 2023, and also was available on HBO Max on the same date.

The series follows Barry Berkman, a hitman from Cleveland who travels to Los Angeles to kill someone but finds himself joining an acting class taught by Gene Cousineau, where he meets aspiring actress Sally Reed and begins to question his path in life as he deals with his criminal associates such as Monroe Fuches and NoHo Hank. The previous seasons saw Barry try to decide between both lives, which culminated in his arrest. In the episode, Jim Moss subjects Barry, who escaped prison eight years ago and has returned to Los Angeles to kill Gene and gain control over his legacy, to psychological torture but changes his mind when Barry unwittingly reveals a critical piece of information Gene had neglected. Meanwhile, Gene sees a new opportunity to win back his fame, while Hank tries to kill Fuches and his gang.

According to Nielsen Media Research, the episode was seen by an estimated 0.237 million household viewers and gained a 0.07 ratings share among adults aged 18–49. The episode received critical acclaim, with critics praising the dark humor, performances, character development, writing, directing and set-up for the finale.

== Plot ==
Jim Moss (Robert Wisdom) psychologically tortures Barry (Bill Hader), making him experience losing his loved ones. Meanwhile, Gene (Henry Winkler) and Tom (Fred Melamed) mount a well-received campaign to boycott the production of Barry's biopic.

Hank (Anthony Carrigan) hires a team of assassins to kill Fuches (Stephen Root) and his gang. As Jim prepares to physically torture Barry, Barry daydreams talking with Gene, apologizing for giving him the duffel bag with $250,000. (Note: As depicted in "all the sauces".) This revelation surprises Jim, who corroborates the story from Lon O'Neil's notes. (Note: Which he retrieved in "you're charming".) Gene, meanwhile, is contacted by Matt Iserson (Nate Corddry), who says he is a UTA agent representing Daniel Day-Lewis, who wants to come out of retirement to portray Gene in the biopic. Interested, Gene schedules a meeting. Sally (Sarah Goldberg), who arrived in Los Angeles with John (Zachary Golinger), calls Gene, asking for help. Unwilling to miss the meeting, he tells her to come to his house. The heads of the hired assassins are returned to Hank's office in boxes.

Hank and his assistant try to kill Fuches's gang with a rocket-propelled grenade but miss and are forced to flee. Hank survives and orders Gene kidnapped to reach Barry. Gene meets with Iserson, who says the studio wants Mark Wahlberg to play Barry but that the actor is reluctant to play a cop killer. Gene asserts that, despite his sensationalized performance from eight years prior (Note: As depicted in "Bestest place on the earth".) as well as Barry's crimes, his history with Barry is much more complex than that of a simple hero/villain narrative and Barry, therefore, can still be considered relatable. He ultimately agrees to meet with Wahlberg in Beverly Hills.

At Jim's house, Barry uses a knife to escape the garage but accidentally cuts himself and falls unconscious. Sally arrives at Gene's house, but no one answers. John asks what will they do after everything goes back to normal, prompting her to approach a nearby police officer to turn herself in. However, the officer does not recognize her, and she falls silent hallucinating that he is the man she killed. (Note: As depicted in "starting now".) After the officer leaves, Sally sees John being pulled into a van by Hank's Chechen henchmen who also approach her.

Iserson's meeting is a trap, and Gene is confronted by Jim, DA Buckner (Charles Parnell), and Leo (Andrew Leeds) over the $250,000. "Iserson" is actually an actor who attended one of Gene's earliest acting classes in 2004. They suspect Gene has been lying, with Leo, who figured out that Gene paid for his house using drug money, suspecting that he shot him to keep this a secret. (Note: As depicted in "it takes a psycho".) As Janice killed a Chechen and found drug money in Gene's class, (Note: As depicted in "Chapter Six: Listen With Your Ears, React With Your Face".) they deduce that Gene was involved with the Chechen mafia and manipulated Barry into killing her. (Note: As depicted in "Chapter Eight: Know Your Truth".) This theory is also reinforced by the fact that he was found near her corpse with the alleged Chechen hitman "The Raven." (Note: As depicted in "berkman ﹥ block".)

Back at Jim's house, Barry wakes up and retrieves his phone as it rings. Hank confirms he has Sally and John and tells Barry to come to Nohobal if he wants them safe, leaving Barry furious.

== Production ==
=== Development ===
In April 2023, the episode's title was revealed as "a nice meal" and it was announced that executive producer Liz Sarnoff had written the episode, while series creator and lead actor Bill Hader directed it. This was Sarnoff's fourth writing credit, and Hader's seventeenth directing credit.

=== Writing ===
Explaining Gene's actions, Henry Winkler said, "He absolutely wants to do the right thing, but he is so egocentric. He is so spotlight-starved that he can't help himself. He realizes only afterwards that he has made a gross mistake."

== Reception ==
=== Ratings ===
The episode was watched by 0.237 million viewers, earning a 0.07 in the 18-49 rating demographics on the Nielson ratings scale. This means that 0.07 percent of all households with televisions watched the episode. This was a slight increase from the previous episode, which was watched by 0.232 million viewers with a 0.05 in the 18-49 demographics.

=== Critical reception ===
"a nice meal" received critical acclaim. On the review aggregator Rotten Tomatoes, it holds an approval rating of 100% based on 6 reviews, with an average rating of 9/10. Matt Schimkowitz of The A.V. Club gave the episode an "A" and wrote, "Without seeing the final episode, it's impossible to say how much of this classic Barry tone will make it to the finale. But, considering all the ravens coming home to roost, it does feel like we're heading toward a gutting (in more ways than one) finale. So amid all the plate stacking of 'a nice meal,' it lives up to its name. As the gangster suggested, the episode feels like we're getting a welcome diversion from the pain and misery, like we were taken for a nice meal while four dudes had their heads cut off. For a show that's never cared much what the audience thinks of it, 'a nice meal' plays to the rafters, giving us one last reminder that Barry is a comedy."

Alan Sepinwall of Rolling Stone wrote, "We head into the finale with Barry once again shot from behind, a motif Hader has used multiple times this season. We do not get to see the expression on his face as NoHo Hank threatens Barry's wife and son, but we don't need to. His body language, and everything we know about this damaged, dysfunctional, highly destructive man tells us where all this is headed. The only question left is how many other significant characters may wind up on that beach by the time all is said and done." Ben Rosenstock of Vulture gave the episode a 4 star rating out of 5 and wrote, "Even aside from the strong punchlines, though, there remains something essentially comic about Barry's view of people trapped with themselves, totally unable to resist the pull of the dark side. Even in some of the grimmest scenes, I can see Bill Hader's sense of humor shine through — his amusement at people pathetic enough to compromise every second chance the universe graciously provides them. I have no idea how everything will shake out in next week's finale, yet with one episode to go, it feels like everyone's fate is set in stone."

Steve Greene of IndieWire gave the episode an "A–" and wrote, "For all the shows that Barry shares DNA with — crime dramas, black comedies, metaphysical treatises on morality — as the end nears, it's easiest to see Barry as basically a more dangerous version of The Other Two. Hollywood satire, over-confident narcissists plummeting to depths of their own digging, relationships shredded in a heartbeat. Add a few extra corpses to the Dubek family's peaks and valleys and you get something roughly approximating where Barry finds itself now: desperation, death, and jokes." Josh Spiegel of /Film wrote, "'a nice meal' does a lot of what this season of Barry has done very well — balances a sense of unavoidable bleakness with some solid inside-baseball humor as well as some visually effective gags — while also making me wonder about this being the endgame."
