= Ben mendelsohn (Barry) =

"ben mendelsohn"
- Barry episode
- Episode no.: Season 3 Episode 3
- Directed by: Alec Berg
- Written by: Emma Barrie
- Cinematography by: Darran Tiernan
- Editing by: Franky Guttman
- Original air date: May 8, 2022
- Running time: 25 minutes

Guest appearances
- D'Arcy Carden as Natalie Greer; Michael Irby as Cristobal Sifuentes; Mark-Paul Gosselaar as himself; Jessy Hodges as Lindsay Mandel; Miguel Sandoval as Fernando; Nick Gracer as Yandal; Turhan Troy Caylak as Akhmal; JB Blanc as Batir; Elsie Fisher as Katie; Marika Domińczyk as Anna; Michael Lanahan as Showrunner

Episode chronology
← Previous "limonada"	Next → "all the sauces"

"ben mendelsohn" is the third episode of the third season of the American crime tragicomedy television series Barry. It is the 19th overall episode of the series and was written by Emma Barrie, and directed by series co-creator Alec Berg. It was first broadcast on HBO in the United States on May 8, 2022, and also was available on HBO Max on the same date.

The series follows Barry Berkman, a hitman from Cleveland who travels to Los Angeles to kill someone but finds himself joining an acting class taught by Gene Cousineau, where he meets aspiring actress Sally Reed and begins to question his path in life as he deals with his criminal associates such as Monroe Fuches and NoHo Hank. In the episode, Barry and Gene start preparing for their new extra roles in a new TV series. Meanwhile, Hank tries to convince his henchmen to avoid attacking Cristobal while Sally starts a press junket for her series. The episode is named after actor Ben Mendelsohn.

According to Nielsen Media Research, the episode was seen by an estimated 0.299 million household viewers and gained a 0.07 ratings share among adults aged 18–49. The episode received extremely positive reviews from critics, who praised the performances (especially Winkler), pacing, direction and character development.

== Plot ==
Barry (Bill Hader) and Gene (Henry Winkler) are in the makeup trailer preparing for their new roles in the TV series Laws of Humanity. Showrunner Brian (Michael Lanahan) enters and says that Gene had abused him as an assistant on Murder, She Wrote. Nonetheless, Gene is given an important line, for which Barry prompts Gene to thank them.

At the Chechen heroin operation, Batir (JB Blanc) contemplates killing Cristobal (Michael Irby) in retaliation for the Bolivian raid. Hank (Anthony Carrigan) suggests using Fuches (Stephen Root), but even after Hank lies and says that Barry is no longer a problem, Fuches decides to stay in Chechnya where he is happy. Meanwhile, Cristobal convinces Fernando (Miguel Sandoval) that attacking the Chechens is not worth it and to return to Bolivia instead. Fernando intends to take his men to Johnny Rockets to break the news.

Sally (Sarah Goldberg) and Katie (Elsie Fisher) start the press junket for Joplin, conducting interviews with E! News, Access Hollywood, and other outlets. Sally is surprised by the interviews' short lengths and irrelevant questions, such as who will be the next Spider-Man, for which she suggests Ben Mendelsohn. In their trailer, Gene questions Barry about murdering Moss and the person who took him to see Moss's body. (Note: Revealed to be Fuches in Season 2 Episode 7 "The Audition") Gene also blames himself, stating that if he hadn't brought up Barry's monologue at the lake house, (Note: As depicted in the Season One finale Chapter Eight: Know Your Truth) Moss would have never suspected Barry and would still be alive.

Hank convinces Batir that Fernando, not Cristobal is the true threat. Nevertheless, Batir orders Akhmal (Turhan Troy Caylak) to bomb Cristobal's house as a message. Hank calls Barry to help him but is rebuffed. Barry is then called by Fuches, who apologizes for his actions, but Barry does not reciprocate. Fuches says that Barry ruined Gene's life by killing Moss and the relationship is doomed. Meanwhile, Katie confides in Natalie (D'Arcy Carden) that she feels uncomfortable around Barry. Natalie tries to convince Katie otherwise, but Katie is unnerved when she learns that Barry had lashed out in acting classes and that he killed people as a Marine. When asked about Barry during an interview, Katie hesitates but speaks positively of him.

As they film their scene, Gene punches Barry, telling him to stay away from him and his family before leaving. Barry decides to accept Hank's job, to Batir's annoyance. Back in Chechnya, Fuches expresses the desire for revenge against Barry. His caretaker Anna (Marika Domińczyk) tries to convince him to abandon the idea, using an old fable about forgiveness, but Fuches misses the point of the story.

== Production ==
=== Development ===
In April 2022, the episode's title was revealed as "ben mendelsohn" and it was announced that Emma Barrie had written the episode while series co-creator Alec Berg had directed it. This was Barrie's first writing credit, and Berg's fifth directing credit.

=== Writing ===
Compared to other episodes, the episode underwent extensive reshoots. Notable moments included Hank coming out to his henchmen. While Hader liked the scene, the editors expressed that "it just doesn't feel like this is what they would be talking about." Hader re-wrote the scenes with Duffy Boudreau and Liz Sarnoff. Hader expressed that "it was just like looking at everything cut together and being like, yeah this doesn't feel right. And luckily HBO was supportive, so we went back and did it."

The press junket scenes were inspired by Hader's experience. While promoting The Skeleton Twins, Hader was asked about the film's theme of suicide and then was immediately asked, "What do you think about Ben Affleck as Batman?" He also based it on his experience promoting It Chapter Two, where he was constantly asked the same questions, further adding "it's champagne problems, by the way, I mean we're in that stuff and we're getting asked questions so don't get me wrong, it's champagne problems. But at the same time, I'm like, 'I'm so bored'."

== Reception ==
=== Viewers ===
The episode was watched by 0.299 million viewers, earning a 0.07 in the 18-49 rating demographics on the Nielson ratings scale. This means that 0.07 percent of all households with televisions watched the episode. This was a slight increase from the previous episode, which was watched by 0.294 million viewers with a 0.06 in the 18-49 demographics.

=== Critical reviews ===
"ben mendelsohn" received extremely positive reviews from critics. The review aggregator website Rotten Tomatoes reported a 100% approval rating for the episode, based on 5 reviews with an average rating of 8.0/10.

David Cote of The A.V. Club gave the episode a "B+" and wrote, "After two episodes of nonstop tension and escalating crazy, Barry had to ease up on the gas. There are still surprising turns in this week's descent into assassin-actor delusion with reversals and setups for future action. There's nothing super shocking or explosive, but it's an enjoyable bridge to the meat of the season."

Ben Rosenstock of Vulture gave the episode a 4 star rating out of 5 and wrote, "Barry has always shown that at its best, acting can be a tool for catharsis — a way to exorcise your inner demons, to combine empathy with self-expression. But in Hollywood especially, a successful career in acting also comes with a lot of extra stuff, like the necessary evil of self-promotion." Nick Harley of Den of Geek gave the episode a 3.5 star rating out of 5 and wrote, "While there are still a ton of moving parts in 'ben mendelsohn', it does feel like the episode ends just as things are starting to heat up. No matter: I'll happily take wanting more over feeling like an episode has wasted my time with filler. While Fuches reintroduction back into the mix isn't exactly where I wanted the story to go, it's clear that Barry must wrap up his conflict with his first father figure if he's ever going to figure out what to do with Gene."
