= Chapter Two: Use It =

- Barry episode
- Episode no.: Season 1 Episode 2
- Directed by: Bill Hader
- Written by: Alec Berg; Bill Hader
- Cinematography by: Paula Huidobro
- Editing by: Kyle Reiter
- Original air date: April 1, 2018
- Running time: 32 minutes

Guest appearances
- Paula Newsome as Detective Janice Moss; Michael Bofshever as George Krempf; John Pirruccello as Detective John Loach; Darrell Britt-Gibson as Jermaine Jefrint; D'Arcy Carden as Natalie Greer; Andy Carey as Eric; Izzy Diaz as Detective Clark Roberts; Rightor Doyle as Nick Nicholby; Alejandro Furth as Antonio Manuel; Kirby Howell-Baptiste as Sasha Baxter; Mark Ivanir as Vacha

Episode chronology
← Previous "Chapter One: Make Your Mark"	Next → "Chapter Three: Make the Unsafe Choice"

"Chapter Two: Use It" is the second episode of the first season of the American crime tragicomedy television series Barry. The episode was written by series creators Alec Berg and Bill Hader, and directed by Hader, who also serves as the main lead actor. It was first broadcast on HBO in the United States on April 1, 2018.

The series follows Barry Berkman, a hitman from Cleveland who travels to Los Angeles to kill someone but finds himself joining an acting class taught by Gene Cousineau, where he meets aspiring actress Sally Reed and begins to question his path in life as he deals with his criminal associates such as Monroe Fuches and NoHo Hank. In the episode, Ryan Madison's death devastates the acting class, and they decide to hold an on-stage memorial for Ryan. Barry and Fuches are also confronted by Goran Pazar for Barry's failure in killing Ryan.

According to Nielsen Media Research, the episode was seen by an estimated 0.641 million household viewers and gained a 0.2 ratings share among adults aged 18–49. The episode received critical acclaim, with critics praising the performances, writing and building momentum from the premiere.

== Plot ==
Barry (Bill Hader) is practicing with Sally (Sarah Goldberg) when Gene (Henry Winkler) informs the class about the death of Ryan Madison, whose real name was Richard Krempf, devastating them. Gene tells them that they should use their grief for their acting methods, letting them take the day off. Instead, the class decides to plan an on-stage memorial for Ryan, with each one acting a scene that makes them remember him. Meanwhile, the Los Angeles Police Department is investigating Ryan's death, discovering the lipstick camera. However, they fail to get a lead as they don't know how it works, which frustrates Detective Janice Moss (Paula Newsome).

Barry visits Fuches (Stephen Root) in his hotel room, where Fuches is mad about the Chechens' attempt to kill Barry. Barry wants Fuches out of town but Fuches wants both of them to go to war against them. Barry partly leaves to answer a call from Sally, who asks him to act with her a scene from Doubt, which he accepts. Chechen henchmen soon arrive and brutally attack Fuches, then kidnap both of them.

Barry and Fuches are brought before Hank (Anthony Carrigan), who survived Barry's rampage and is recovering from a wound, and Goran (Glenn Fleshler), who is mad that Barry killed one of his men and wants him to kill an informant for him. Barry refuses, even when the Chechens start torturing Fuches by tooth-filing. Barry reluctantly accepts, but the Chechens will keep Fuches until he completes the job. That night at the memorial, Barry and Sally prepare for their scene, where Barry realizes that their piece was the last one that Sally and Ryan performed together in class.

At the memorial, Barry is informed that his target is named Paco Zambrana and is given his address. Before their performance, Ryan's father, George Krempf (Michael Bofshever), delivers a speech where he tearfully thanks them for their commitment and breaking down by questioning who would kill his son. The speech heavily impacts Barry, who storms out as he feels affected by realizing the damage he inflicted on Ryan's father. Sally consoles him and decides to cancel their performance. The bar then places an "In Memoriam" plaque of Ryan to honor him. Barry then accompanies Sally home, who suddenly says they should not have sex, though Barry says this was not his intent, surprising her. As Barry leaves, a Chechen is seen taking pictures of Sally.

== Production ==
=== Development ===
In February 2018, the episode's title was revealed as "Chapter Two: Use It" and it was announced that series creators Alec Berg and Bill Hader had written the episode while Hader had directed it. This was Hader's second writing credit, Berg's second writing credit, and Hader's second directing credit.

== Reception ==
=== Viewers ===
The episode was watched by 0.641 million viewers, earning a 0.2 in the 18-49 rating demographics on the Nielson ratings scale. This means that 0.2 percent of all households with televisions watched the episode. This was a 13% increase from the previous episode, which was watched by 0.564 million viewers with a 0.2 in the 18-49 demographics.

=== Critical reviews ===
"Chapter Two: Use It" received critical acclaim. Vikram Murthi of The A.V. Club gave the episode an "A−" and wrote, "Barry pulls no punches about the actual talents in the class — most are terrible and the best, like Sally, are still somewhat middling — but it treats the community itself with a disarming sincerity. Gene's acting class provides hope to those who are otherwise floundering, providing them with a sense of purpose, or an avenue to exercise their passions. Barry isn't an actor, but he wants to be something, and though it requires more of him than he expected, he's also not ready to leave it behind."

Nick Harley of Den of Geek wrote, "Once again, I'm impressed by how well Barry is able to balance its disparate tones. Barry's obvious damage and earnestness makes this show affecting in an interesting way. It has me invested in the character so early and honestly worried about his well-being so much so that I appreciate the moments of levity when they come all the more. Also, in two episodes its stunning how much story work this show has done. Barry is one of the most self-assured new series I've ever seen, I can't wait for casual TV fans to catch wind of it." Charles Bramesco of Vulture gave the episode a 4 star rating out of 5 and wrote, "In its second episode, 'Use It', Barry fully presents itself as the workplace sitcom suggested by the funny little banalities of the pilot. It doesn't matter whether you're a contract gun, a gangster, or a cop — everyone's subject to the same incompetence, pettiness, and awkwardness of the average mid-range retail-paper office. Bill Hader opens up a rich comic vein by contrasting the sensational life-or-death stakes of the crime genre with interdepartmental fussiness and uncomfortable client meetings."
