= Barry (TV series) =

American crime tragicomedy TV series (2018–2023)

- Genre: Black comedy; Comedy drama; Crime; Psychological drama; Tragicomedy
- Created by: Alec Berg; Bill Hader
- Showrunners: Alec Berg; Bill Hader
- Directed by: Bill Hader; Various (seasons 1–3)
- Starring: Bill Hader; Stephen Root; Sarah Goldberg; Glenn Fleshler; Anthony Carrigan; Henry Winkler; Sarah Burns; Robert Wisdom
- Opening theme: "Change for the World" by Charles Bradley (seasons 1–3)
- Composer: David Wingo
- Country of origin: United States
- Original language: English
- No. of seasons: 4
- No. of episodes: 32

Production
- Executive producers: Alec Berg; Bill Hader; Aida Rodgers; Liz Sarnoff
- Producers: Emily Heller; Sarah Solemani; Ben Smith; Kris Baucom; Megan Murphy; Amy Solomon; Julie Camino; Jason Kim; Duffy Boudreau; Arturs Rusis; Davin Michaels
- Cinematography: Brandon Trost; Paula Huidobro; Carl Herse; Darran Tiernan
- Editors: Jeff Buchanan; Kyle Reiter; Franky Guttman; Ali Greer
- Camera setup: Single-camera
- Running time: 26–37 minutes
- Production companies: HBO Entertainment; Alec Berg Inc.; Hanarply

Original release
- Network: HBO
- Release: March 25, 2018 – May 28, 2023

Barry is an American crime tragicomedy television series created by Alec Berg and Bill Hader for HBO. Set and primarily filmed in Los Angeles, California, the series stars Hader as Barry Berkman, a depressed hitman who joins an acting class while hunting a target, and begins to question his path in life as he deals with his criminal associates while navigating his new relationships. It also stars Stephen Root, Sarah Goldberg, Anthony Carrigan, and Henry Winkler.

The series premiered on HBO on March 25, 2018, and concluded on May 28, 2023, after four seasons and 32 episodes. It explores themes relating to psychological trauma, morality, honesty, forgiveness, the impacts of violent crime, and criticisms of the American film industry.

Barry received critical acclaim, with most praise going to its directing, writing, originality, humor, characters, and performances (particularly those of Hader and Winkler) as well as its examination of its subject matter. The series received various accolades, including 55 Primetime Emmy Award nominations, 10 Golden Globe Award nominations, and 12 Critics' Choice Award nominations. At the Emmys, Hader won Outstanding Lead Actor in a Comedy Series twice, while Winkler won Outstanding Supporting Actor in a Comedy Series for his performance in the first season.

== Premise ==
Barry follows Barry Berkman, a U.S. Marine and Afghanistan veteran from Cleveland, who works as a hitman and wrestles with loneliness, depression, and guilt caused by his lifestyle as well as his actions during his service. He travels to Los Angeles to kill a target and finds a new sense of purpose when he follows his target into an acting class. After joining the class and making plans to become an actor, using his newfound passion as an outlet for his anxiety, he struggles to distance himself from his old life and keep his past a secret from new friends and colleagues.

== Cast and characters ==
=== Main ===
- Bill Hader as Barry Berkman, a depressed former Lance Corporal from the U.S. Marines and Afghanistan veteran who works as a hitman but is drawn towards human connection in an acting class. A mentally unstable yet exceptional assassin, Barry longs to put his criminal history behind him to become a full-time performer under the stage name Barry Block, but struggles to stop his past from creeping into the new life he tries to build for himself. The character's struggle with anxiety in a profession for which he has natural talent was inspired by Hader's tenure as a cast member on Saturday Night Live. According to early drafts of the pilot episode's screenplay, Barry's surname was originally planned to be "Belkin".
  - Reese Levine portrays Barry as a child in flashbacks (season 4).
- Stephen Root as Monroe Fuches, Barry's old family friend since Barry's childhood and a former military cook, who groomed him for his post-military career as a hitman. He is cowardly, manipulative, and self-centered, refusing to believe he has been anything but good to Barry despite consistently abusing him and dragging him back into a life of crime to serve his own personal interests.
- Sarah Goldberg as Sally Reed, an aspiring and talented but struggling actress from Joplin, Missouri. She meets Barry when he joins her acting class and becomes romantically involved with him, culminating in a dysfunctional relationship. Seemingly good-natured but selfish and envious, Sally is focused on gaining fame and fortune as an actress while frequently alternating between bouts of narcissism and self-hatred in both her personal life and creative work.
- Glenn Fleshler as Goran Pazar (season 1; guest season 3), the leader of the Los Angeles branch of the Chechen mafia, who employs Barry to kill a man who has been sleeping with his wife. Despite his ruthlessness as a crime boss, he cares greatly for his teenage daughter Natasha.
- Anthony Carrigan as NoHo Hank, Goran's overly positive, polite, and naïve best friend and right-hand man, whose Chechen birth name is never revealed. Though he would be happier conducting legitimate business, particularly in sales, he sticks to his belief that being a gangster is his life's calling. Hank quickly becomes attached to Barry, who does not reciprocate his attempts at friendship. Following Goran's death, he becomes the leader of the Chechen mafia but struggles with this responsibility as he lacks in the skills necessary to be a gangster. Originally planned to be killed by Barry in the pilot episode, Hank was made a series regular after Carrigan's performance impressed the show's creators.
- Henry Winkler as Gene Cousineau, an eccentric acting coach and Barry's mentor whose glory days as a performer are long behind him, having alienated his industry colleagues and loved ones. Cousineau is self-absorbed and rarely seems to help his acting students, in whom he instills a nearly fanatical devotion, unless it directly benefits him. Despite this, he makes a connection with and serves as a father figure to Barry, helping him come to terms with his past atrocities and grow as a person until he learns of his criminal activity.
- Sarah Burns as Detective Mae Dunn (season 3; recurring season 2; guest season 4), a naïve and obtuse investigator who becomes Detective John Loach's partner.
- Robert Wisdom as Jim Moss (season 4; recurring season 3), a Vietnam veteran and former SERE instructor, and the father of LAPD Detective Janice Moss, who previously served in the U.S. Army in the field of psychological warfare.

=== Recurring ===
- Paula Newsome as Detective Janice Moss (also starring season 1; guest season 2), a police officer investigating the murder of Ryan Madison, who starts an on-and-off relationship with Gene.
- John Pirruccello as Detective John Loach (seasons 1–2), Moss' perpetually depressed partner who later finds himself investigating Barry.
- Michael Irby as Cristobal Sifuentes, a Bolivian drug lord with whom the Chechens come into conflict, and later Hank's love interest. His ultimate goal is to unite all of LA's criminal gangs for what he believes will be a greater good.
- D'Arcy Carden as Natalie Greer (seasons 1–3; guest season 4), an actress and Sally's friend. Natalie often serves as Cousineau's personal assistant during acting class, and later becomes Sally's assistant on her television series.
- Kirby Howell-Baptiste as Sasha Baxter (seasons 1–2; guest season 4), a British actress in Cousineau's acting class.
- Darrell Britt-Gibson as Jermaine Jefrint (seasons 1–3), an actor in Cousineau's acting class.
- Andy Carey as Eric (seasons 1–2; guest season 4), an actor in Cousineau's class with a proclivity for slam poetry and rap, neither of which he has any talent for.
- Alejandro Furth as Antonio Manuel (seasons 1–2; guest season 4), a Puerto Rican actor in Cousineau's class.
- Rightor Doyle as Nick Nicholby (seasons 1–3; guest season 4), an actor in Cousineau's class who acts all his scenes as "flamboyantly gay".
- Mark Ivanir as Vacha and Ruslan (season 1; guest season 3), twin brothers and Chechen assassins working for Goran. While Vacha is more serious and vengeful, Ruslan is an enthusiastic and theatrical torturer considered irritating by his colleagues.
- Chris Marquette as Chris Lucado (season 1; guest season 3), a former Marine logistics officer and one of Barry's only friends.
- Karen David as Sharon Lucado (seasons 1, 3), Chris' wife.
- Dale Pavinski as Taylor Garrett (season 1), a former Marine and one of Chris' friends.
- Marcus Brown as Vaughn (season 1), a former Marine and Chris and Taylor's friend.
- Jessy Hodges as Lindsay Mandel (seasons 2–4), Sally's talent agent.
- Nikita Bogolyubov as Mayrbek (season 2; guest season 3), a star pupil of the new Chechen army and Barry's protégé, earning him the nickname "Baby Barry”.
- Troy Caylak as Akhmal (seasons 2–3), a Chechen mobster who often serves as Hank's right-hand man.
- JB Blanc as Batir (seasons 2–4), a Chechen mobster and Hank's immediate boss.
- Nick Gracer as Yandar (seasons 2–3), a Chechen mobster.
- James Hiroyuki Liao as Special Agent Albert Nguyen (seasons 2–3), a former Marine who served alongside Barry. He later arrives in LA to help investigate crimes as an FBI agent.
- Andrew Leeds as Leo Cousineau (seasons 2–4), Gene's estranged son and an organic farmer.
- Patricia Fa'asua as Esther (season 2; guest season 3), a Burmese gang leader.
- Elizabeth Perkins as Diane Villa (season 3), a major TV producer and head of the streaming service BanShe.
- Elsie Fisher as Katie Harris (season 3; guest season 4), a teenage actress playing the role of Chloe in Sally's TV series Joplin.
- Gary Kraus as Chief Krauss (seasons 3–4; guest seasons 1–2), the chief of the LAPD, nicknamed the "Big Cat".
- Miguel Sandoval as Fernando (season 3), the head of the Bolivian cartel and Cristobal's father-in-law.
- Eli Michael Kaplan (season 3) and Charlie Korman (guest season 4) as Gordon Cousineau, Gene's grandson and Leo's son.
- Laura San Giacomo as Annie Eisner (season 3), a theater director and Gene's ex-girlfriend.
- Fred Melamed as Tom Posorro (seasons 3–4), Gene's talent agent.
- Jolene Van Vugt as Traci (season 3), Taylor's sister.
- Michael Bofshever as George Krempf (season 3; guest season 1), Ryan Madison's father.
- Patrick Fischler as Lon O'Neil (season 4), a Vanity Fair writer terrorized into silence by Jim Moss after interviewing Gene and Barry. Fischler previously auditioned for the role of Fuches but was later given this part as compensation, at the request of casting director Sherry Thomas.
- Charles Parnell as District Attorney Buckner (season 4), the district attorney for Los Angeles.
- François Chau as Bong (season 4), a Thai mob boss who joins Hank and Cristobal's sand importation business venture.
- Tobie Windham and Andre Hyland, respectively, as "Groove Tube" Damian and "Live Wire" Jason (season 4), two prison inmates who join Fuches' gang and continue working with him after their release from prison.
- David Warshofsky as FBI Agent Harris (season 4), an incompetent FBI agent.
- Zachary Golinger (season 4) and Jaeden Martell (guest season 4) as John, Barry and Sally's son.

=== Guest ===
- Tyler Jacob Moore as Richard Krempf / Ryan Madison, a personal trainer and actor in Gene's class whom Goran hires Barry to kill, though Ryan is instead killed by Chechen assassins. ("Chapter One: Make Your Mark")
- Mia Juel as Oksana Pazar, Goran's wife, who cheated on him with Ryan. ("Chapter One: Make Your Mark")
- Mo Anouti and Dennis Keiffer as "Thick Neck" and "Lucky", the Chechen mobsters who kill Ryan, only to be killed by Barry. ("Chapter One: Make Your Mark")
- Melissa Villaseñor as a diner waitress aspiring to be an actress. ("Chapter One: Make Your Mark")
- Cameron Britton as Charlie Simmer, a detective in the LAPD. ("Chapter Two: Use It", "Chapter Four: Commit... to YOU")
- Robert Curtis Brown as Mike Hallman, a talent agent who helps Sally book acting auditions. ("Chapter Three: Make the Unsafe Choice", "Chapter Four: Commit... to YOU")
- Geo Corvera as Paco Zambrana, a Bolivian mobster turned informant for the Chechens. ("Chapter Three: Make the Unsafe Choice")
- Larry Hankin as Stovka, a renowned Chechen assassin and brother of Vacha and Ruslan, who is weary of his life as a contract killer and appears severely aged despite being only 45 years old. ("Chapter Three: Make the Unsafe Choice")
- Kat Foster as Liv, a former friend of Sally's. ("Chapter Three: Make the Unsafe Choice")
- Jon Hamm as himself ("Chapter Four: Commit... to YOU")
- Michael Beach as Police Detective ("The Power of No")
- Patrick Fabian as Space Dad ("The Power of No")
- Sam Ingraffia as Thomas Friedman ("Past = Present x Future Over Yesterday")
- Joe Massingill as Sam, Sally's abusive ex-husband. ("Past = Present x Future Over Yesterday", "What?!")
- Daniel Bernhardt as Ronny Proxin, a deadly martial artist whom Loach hires Barry to kill as revenge for sleeping with his ex-wife. ("ronny/lily")
- Jessie Giacomazzi as Lily Proxin, Ronny's 12-year-old daughter who is also skilled in martial arts and behaves in a near-feral manner when angered. ("ronny/lily") Hader was introduced by stunt coordinator Wade Allen to Giacomazzi, a practicing martial artist since childhood, and subsequently wrote Lily's character for her.
- Jay Roach as himself ("The Audition")
- Allison Jones as herself ("The Audition", "limonada")
- Mark-Paul Gosselaar as himself, the star of Laws of Humanity. ("ben mendelsohn")
- Annabeth Gish as Julie, the widow of Barry's victim killed in the series premiere. ("all the sauces", "crazytimesh*tshow")
- Joe Mantegna as himself ("all the sauces", "crazytimesh*tshow")
- Michael Ironside as Andrei, an elder Chechen mafia boss. ("crazytimesh*tshow", "it takes a psycho")
- Krizia Bajos as Elena, Fernando's daughter and Cristobal's wife. ("crazytimesh*tshow", "starting now")
- Vanessa Bayer as Morgan Dawn-Cherry, a BanShe executive who offers Sally a writer's room job. ("710N")
- Michael Dempsey as Joe Reed, Sally's caring father. ("yikes")
- Romy Rosemont as Claudia Reed, Sally's emotionally abusive mother. ("yikes")
- Michael Villar as Officer Birdwell, a prison guard. ("yikes")
- John Gloria as John Berkman, Barry's father and a military veteran appearing in flashbacks, who introduced him to Fuches and had at least two other children before Barry, his youngest son. ("yikes", "bestest place on the earth")
- Matt Servitto as Gale Winograde, Fuches' lawyer. ("bestest place on the earth")
- Richard Riehle as Warden Reynolds, the warden of the prison where Barry and Fuches are confined. ("you're charming", "it takes a psycho")
- Dan Bakkedahl as FBI WITSEC Agent James Curtis ("you're charming")
- Fred Armisen as Nestor Flores, a hitman who hosts a podcast for tech product reviews with his brother and fellow hitman Chuy. ("you're charming")
- Guillermo del Toro as Toro, a handler for assassins who procures Nestor and Chuy to kill Barry for Hank and Cristobal. ("you're charming")
- Ellyn Jameson as Kristen, a student in Sally's acting class, who goes on to become the star of Mega Girls, an in-universe blockbuster superhero film series. ("you're charming", "it takes a psycho")
- Sian Heder as herself, the reluctant director of Mega Girls. ("it takes a psycho")
- Paul McCrane as Mark Staffordshire, a talent agent representing Sally's acting student Kristen. ("it takes a psycho") Like Patrick Fischler, McCrane previously auditioned for the role of Fuches but was later given this part as compensation, again per casting director Sherry Thomas's request.
- Spenser Granese as Bevel, Sally's coworker at a diner who fantasizes about her and accidentally discovers her true identity. ("tricky legacies")
- Adrian Sparks as the owner of the diner where Sally works while living on the run with Barry. ("tricky legacies")
- Annie Chang as Josie, the assistant to the head of Warner Bros. Pictures. ("tricky legacies", "the wizard")
- Bill Burr and James Austin Johnson as the voices of online pastors Barry listens to. ("the wizard")
- Carrie Gibson as a barista and single mother who becomes Fuches' apparent wife. ("the wizard", "a nice meal")
- Nate Corddry as "Matt Iserson", a student from one of Gene's earliest acting classes who poses as a UTA agent to lure Gene into a trap. ("a nice meal")
- Ross Partridge as Robert, an AP history teacher Sally meets some years after Barry's death. ("wow")
- Julian Zane Chowdhury as Eric, John's high school friend, who shows him the biographical drama The Mask Collector, which paints Gene as a villain and Barry as a tragic hero. ("wow")
- Jim Cummings, Louisa Krause, Michael Cumpsty, Kimberly Hébert Gregory, and Finn Sweeney as actors portraying Barry, Sally, Gene, Janice, and John in The Mask Collector. ("wow")

== Episodes ==
Season	Episodes	Originally released	
Season	Episodes	First released	Last released
1	8	March 25, 2018	May 13, 2018
2	8	March 31, 2019	May 19, 2019
3	8	April 24, 2022	June 12, 2022
4	8	April 16, 2023	May 28, 2023

=== Season 1 (2018) ===
No. overall	No. in season	Title	Directed by	Written by	Original release date	U.S. viewers (millions)
1	1	"Chapter One: Make Your Mark"	Bill Hader	Alec Berg & Bill Hader	March 25, 2018	0.564
Contract killer Barry Berkman arrives in Los Angeles, hired by Chechen mob boss Goran Pazar to kill Ryan Madison for sleeping with Goran's wife. Barry follows Ryan to an acting class taught by Gene Cousineau, where Ryan convinces Barry to perform a scene with him. Despite a poor performance, Ryan befriends Barry and invites him to a bar with the class, where Barry takes an interest in student Sally Reed. Barry drives a drunk Ryan home, which is witnessed by NoHo Hank, Goran's second-in-command. The next day, Barry's handler Monroe Fuches arrives and warns Barry that the Chechens will kill them if Barry does not kill Ryan. That night, Barry tells Gene he is a hitman but wants a different life. Gene, believing the confession is an improvised performance, gives Barry another chance at his class, and Barry introduces himself as "Barry Block", a stage name Ryan devised. Barry decides to visit Ryan but finds Ryan already dead and the Chechens prepared to shoot him, too. Barry shoots the Chechens, unaware that their lipstick camera has recorded him. At a nearby diner, while police cars speed past, Barry tells his waitress that he is an actor.
2	2	"Chapter Two: Use It"	Bill Hader	Alec Berg & Bill Hader	April 1, 2018	0.641
LAPD detectives investigate the murders of Ryan and the Chechen mobsters and discover the Russian lipstick camera left by Hank but cannot figure out how it works. Barry and Fuches are kidnapped by the Chechens, and Fuches is tortured via tooth-filing until Barry reluctantly agrees to carry out one last hit on an informant. Gene tells his class that Ryan was murdered, and the students plan an on-stage memorial service, each performing a piece in Ryan's honor. Sally asks Barry to perform a scene from Doubt, the last piece she and Ryan performed together in the class. At the service, Ryan's father George Krempf, whose son's real name was Richard Krempf, delivers an impassioned speech, causing Barry distress because he has never before seen the aftermath of his killings. Shaken, Barry declines to perform the Doubt piece. As he walks Sally home, she expresses her desire to have sex with him, but he declines her advances and rushes off. From afar, a Chechen takes photos of Sally.
3	3	"Chapter Three: Make the Unsafe Choice"	Bill Hader	Duffy Boudreau	April 8, 2018	0.595
Barry is ready to kill the Chechens' next target, Paco, but NoHo Hank tells him to wait. Goran's new assassin, Stovka, arrives and is instructed to kill Barry and Fuches once Barry returns. Fuches attempts to talk Stovka out of killing him, and Stovka ends up killing himself instead. Detectives Janice Moss and John Loach learn of Ryan's connection to Goran and question Gene and his students. Barry helps Sally prepare for an audition, where Sally is devastated to find that the lead actress is a former friend she had worked with on a failed TV series, and cries during her audition. Barry again prepares to kill Paco but is interrupted by a phone call from Sally, who vents about her problems and begs him to come over. Barry misses his chance to kill Paco with a sniper rifle, so breaks into his house and strangles him to death. Barry then has sex with Sally at her apartment and daydreams about a happy future with her but is haunted by Paco's last words, which mean: "You don't have to do this".
4	4	"Chapter Four: Commit... to YOU"	Maggie Carey	Sarah Solemani	April 15, 2018	0.511
Barry reconnects with Chris, an old military friend. Fuches gives Barry his next job: to raid a Bolivian stash house for Goran, but Barry believes it to be too dangerous and backs out. Sally prepares for an audition with her agent, who makes an unwelcome advance and claims he was only joking. At the audition, the casting assistant tells Sally that her agent does not represent her and sends her home in tears. Detective Moss meets with Gene at a restaurant, expecting pertinent information about the case; realizing it is a date, she stays anyway. Police techs unlock the lipstick camera, showing Barry as an obscure, silhouetted figure. At a party, Barry presents Sally with an expensive new laptop as a gift, making her uncomfortable since she barely knows him. Barry invites Chris, who brings two other rowdy marines, Vaughn and Taylor. Barry continues to misinterpret his relationship with Sally, and with the marines encouraging him to assert himself, he oversteps and angers Sally. After the party, Taylor finds Barry's notes on the stash house raid and tells Barry that he wants to take part.
5	5	"Chapter Five: Do Your Job"	Hiro Murai	Ben Smith	April 22, 2018	0.643
Sally suggests she and Barry take a break from each other, only to discover they have been cast as scene partners in their class's Shakespeare showcase. Detective Moss returns to the acting class and re-interviews Barry and two others who are consistent with the image from the lipstick camera. Barry provides an alibi with the help of Fuches, who tells him to kill Taylor once the raid is done; Barry reluctantly agrees despite his qualms about killing a fellow marine. The acting class discusses the morality of Macbeth, and Barry, feeling the moral weight of his profession, has an emotional outburst, yelling at the class that he has killed people. The class assumes this confession is about Barry's time in the military, while Gene condemns the idea of killing outside of war. That night, Barry and Taylor successfully raid the stash house, killing several men, with Taylor doing most of the killing as well as saving Barry's life. The next morning, Barry meets with Fuches, who is happy to see Barry alive. Taylor soon joins, revealing Barry did not follow Fuches's advice.
6	6	"Chapter Six: Listen With Your Ears, React With Your Face"	Hiro Murai	Emily Heller	April 29, 2018	0.560
Barry and Fuches survey a desert airstrip used by Bolivian drug lord Cristobal Sifuentes, and Fuches tells Barry he wants Taylor gone. At the stash house, Goran forbids Vacha from killing Barry to avenge his brother's death. After spending the night with Gene, Detective Moss ends their relationship as she is investigating his class. At Taylor's apartment, Barry suggests that Taylor work for Fuches in his place, but Taylor says Barry should kill Fuches. Without Barry's knowledge, Taylor puts half of the stash house money into Barry's backpack, in place of Gene's acting textbook. At acting class, Barry finds the money and hides it. Vacha arrives at the class and follows Sally to her car, but bumps into Moss, who has come to rekindle her relationship with Gene. Vacha runs, and Moss kills him in a shootout. A search warrant is executed at the acting class and the hidden money is found. Barry tells Taylor he will do the job alone, but Taylor arrives with Vaughn and Chris to rapidly storm the airstrip, following Gene's advice from the book. Taylor recklessly drives them to the airfield, where Taylor and Vaughn are shot dead at long range by the Bolivians.
7	7	"Chapter Seven: Loud, Fast, and Keep Going"	Alec Berg	Liz Sarnoff	May 6, 2018	0.636
Barry and Chris are the only survivors of the botched attack. After Chris kills a Bolivian gang member, the two escape the airfield and return to Los Angeles. Going immediately to rehearsal, Barry gives poor line delivery and is berated by Sally and Gene. The Chechens receive a call from their assassination target, Cristobal, who says that he would have gladly shared the stash house with them but now is forced to declare war. Goran, furious with Fuches and believing Barry dead, orders NoHo Hank to kill Fuches. Moss learns that there was a "military guy" involved in the Chechen–Bolivian violence and suspects Barry, but Taylor is already linked to Ryan by evidence. A visibly shaken Chris tells Barry that he intends to go to the police to clear his conscience. As Chris backtracks, Barry kills him, stages it as a suicide, and suffers an emotional breakdown. Arriving late to the class's Shakespeare night, Barry delivers his single line with such emotional intensity that the audience becomes captivated and Sally receives a confidence boost, impressing an agent she had invited.
8	8	"Chapter Eight: Know Your Truth"	Alec Berg	Alec Berg & Bill Hader	May 13, 2018	0.548
Barry visits Fuches, punches him, and takes a share of his money before telling him he wants to give up crime. Fuches tells Goran that Barry is alive and should be killed, but Goran prepares to kill Fuches instead. Hank alerts Barry, who promptly kills Goran and others holding Fuches, forcing Fuches out of Los Angeles. Hank assumes leadership of the Chechens and allies with the Bolivians. Moss discovers Ryan's copy of Gene's book in Taylor's apartment, believing the two had conspired to bait the Chechens and Bolivians into war. The LAPD discovers the bodies at Goran's house and conclude the Bolivians were responsible, closing the case. Barry rejoins the acting class, resuming his relationship with Sally. Some time later, Gene invites Barry, Sally and Moss to his country home. Gene tells Moss of the monologue Barry gave about being a hitman, prompting Moss to discover a link between Barry, Chris, and Taylor on Facebook. Barry begs her not to pursue things further. When she refuses, he retrieves a hidden gun, and shots ring out. Barry returns to the still-sleeping Sally, and declares, yet again, that his criminal life is over.

=== Season 2 (2019) ===
No. overall	No. in season	Title	Directed by	Written by	Original release date	U.S. viewers (millions)
9	1	"The Show Must Go On, Probably?"	Hiro Murai	Alec Berg & Bill Hader	March 31, 2019	0.532
Weeks after Moss' disappearance, the police close the case over a lack of leads, sending Gene further into grief-stricken isolation. Gene eventually visits his students after a long absence and tells them he intends to shut down the acting class, but Barry convinces him to continue teaching by recounting his first killing while serving as a Marine. Hank finds his thriving partnership with Cristobal threatened by Esther, a Burmese gang leader the Bolivians want to bring into their operation. Hank, facing retaliation from his family for failing to kill Goran's assassin, pins the blame on Esther to protect Barry. He seeks help from Barry, who furiously turns him away for approaching him in public. Hank later approaches Barry again, reminding him that he owes Hank his life, and threatens to kill Barry and his friends unless Barry kills Esther. Fuches, meanwhile, is arrested in Cleveland after hiring a new hitman to replace Barry. Unbeknownst to him, his DNA is matched to a missing tooth found at Goran's murder. Detective Loach uses this information to connect Fuches to Barry, surmising that Barry is the man in the lipstick camera's footage.
10	2	"The Power of No"	Hiro Murai	Taofik Kolade	April 7, 2019	0.424
Hank enlists Barry to kill Esther, but Barry is reluctant to return to a life of killing. Gene, inspired by Barry's tale of his first kill, tasks the acting class with writing and performing a short piece that encapsulates their own personal truth. Barry, not wanting his "truth" to be death, convinces Gene to let him tell the story of the day they met. However, after attempting to reconnect with his estranged son Leo, an organic farmer, Gene realizes that he is too self-absorbed and tells Barry that he must tell the Afghanistan story. Sally has found minor success under her new agents, but becomes frustrated at being cast in insignificant roles. Her agent Lindsay sympathizes and urges her to bide her time until the right role comes along. Loach tracks down Fuches in Ohio, and convinces him to return to Los Angeles and elicit a confession from Barry in order to keep himself out of jail. Barry finds himself unable to carry out the hit on Esther, and narrowly escapes from the furious Burmese mob. Barry finds Fuches waiting for him upon returning home, and angrily rebuffs him while a frustrated Loach watches from a surveillance van.
11	3	"Past = Present x Future Over Yesterday"	Minkie Spiro	Jason Kim	April 14, 2019	1.78
Hank attempts to kill Barry after learning of the failed hit on Esther, but Barry foils the assassination attempt. He offers to train Hank and his men so that Hank can eliminate the Burmese himself, restoring Hank's partnership with Cristobal while fulfilling Barry's debt to Hank. For his scene, Barry decides to tell a different story from the war, in which he saved his friend Albert while serving in the Korangal Valley, but struggles to cast himself in a positive light. Fuches again approaches Barry, who welcomes him this time and asks for advice on how to tell the Korangal story; Fuches advises against it and the two have an emotional reunion, further frustrating Loach. Sally decides to tell the story of the night she left her abusive ex-husband, Sam, but feels ashamed that she never stood up to him, and instead writes a version of the story painting her in a stronger light. Barry is reluctant at having to choke Sally while playing the role of Sam; Sally and Gene berate him to get him in the right headspace, but Barry storms out. Sally follows and attempts to reason with him, but shuts down upon realizing Sam has arrived in Los Angeles.
12	4	"What?!"	Liza Johnson	Duffy Boudreau	April 21, 2019	1.94
Barry and Sally have dinner with Sam, where Barry barely contains his rage. Afterwards, Sally breaks down and admits to Barry that she never stood up to Sam. Sally becomes distraught about telling the truth about her relationship with Sam onstage, but Barry assures her that it is sometimes appropriate to keep secrets. Barry later notices Sam sneaking into the theater to watch Sally rehearse her scene; he confronts Sam, who insults Sally and drives away. Sam invites Sally to his hotel to receive a gift; while there, Sam attempts to coerce her out of performing her scene to preserve his reputation. Barry, who secretly followed Sally to the hotel to kill Sam, nearly shoots her when she opens the door to leave. An ashamed Barry visits Gene and opens up about Korangal, where he killed an innocent civilian in a blind rage after Albert had been shot. Gene, shaken by Barry's confession, agrees that he should not share the story with the class, but reassures him that people can change their nature. His spirits lifted, Barry goes to Fuches's hotel to share Gene's advice, but is cornered by Loach into confessing to Moss' murder. However, instead of arresting Barry, Loach blackmails him into killing his ex-wife's lover.
13	5	"ronny/lily"	Bill Hader	Alec Berg & Bill Hader	April 28, 2019	2.03
Barry finds Ronny, Loach's ex-wife's lover, at his house and attempts to negotiate a peaceful deal. However, Ronny is a deadly Taekwondo champion, and the two fight until Ronny collapses from a broken windpipe. Ronny's daughter Lily, also skilled in martial arts, comes home and viciously attacks Barry with seemingly superhuman strength, speed, and agility before fleeing. Barry, left with a stab wound, urges Fuches to take him to a hospital; Fuches instead drives to a drugstore and shoddily stitches Barry's wound himself. When Fuches begins to talk about the wound Ronny caused, Barry notes that Lily actually stabbed him. Fuches drives around the neighborhood looking for Lily, but gives up on killing her after watching her scale a tree and sit perched for hours on a roof. That night, Barry rips his stitches; Fuches attempts to close the wound with superglue, but ends up gluing his hands to the steering wheel. Lily sneaks into the car and bites off a piece of Fuches's cheek before escaping. Barry and Fuches return to the drugstore, where Barry finds Ronny alive and ready to fight again. Loach arrives and shoots Ronny, but Ronny kills him effortlessly before being shot dead by other police officers. Barry flees and returns to Fuches's car, contemplating their relationship.
14	6	"The Truth Has a Ring to It"	Alec Berg	Emily Heller	May 5, 2019	1.99
Barry, infuriated that Fuches turned on him, breaks off their relationship for good and returns to acting class. Once there, he discovers that Sally has rewritten her scene to tell the truth about her relationship with Sam, but is mortified after doing a cold reading for the class. Barry asks for Gene's help, requesting that Gene help him perform well in Sally's scene in lieu of writing his own. Gene tells Barry to use his own story to find the emotion in Sally's. Onstage, Barry taps into his trauma over killing Detective Moss and delivers a spectacular performance, much to Gene's satisfaction. Lindsay, having witnessed the entire performance, offers to help Sally use it to branch out in her career. Meanwhile, Barry has finished training the Chechens, and Hank gives Barry a pin as a gift for having repaid his debt. Mayrbek, a young Chechen, thanks Barry for giving him purpose and improving his prowess as a soldier. As Hank prepares to ambush Esther, he is surprised to find that his whole army has been captured after an accordion player he had previously insulted sold them out to Esther and Cristobal. Fuches, furious at Barry, begins to comb through the woods near Gene's cabin and eventually finds the car containing Moss's body.
15	7	"The Audition"	Alec Berg	Liz Sarnoff	May 12, 2019	1.87
Sally turns down an offer to star in a series about abused women killing their husbands, believing it to be revenge porn. She becomes envious of Barry after he easily lands an audition for a lead role in a feature film directed by Jay Roach. Lindsay offers Sally the chance to have the acting class perform their scenes before a large audience to get Sally's story out into the world. After Hank's men escape the attempt on their lives by the Bolivians and Burmese, they abandon Hank due to his poor leadership and turn to Mayrbek as their leader. Gene does not appear at Barry's audition; Barry discovers he is with Fuches, who is posing as a private detective to lead Gene to Moss's body. After hearing Gene explain how Barry was lost until he came to his class, an infuriated Fuches leads him to Moss's car. After opening the trunk and showing Moss's body to the distraught Gene, Fuches calls the police and confesses to murdering her, pretending to be Gene. Fuches then raises a gun to Gene's head while Barry races through the forest.
16	8	"berkman ﹥ block"	Bill Hader	Alec Berg & Bill Hader	May 19, 2019	2.21
Unable to bring himself to shoot Gene, Fuches whispers something in his ear and flees. Barry and Gene are taken into custody; Barry is soon released while Gene is arrested on suspicion of killing Moss. Barry vows to kill Fuches. Gene's students perform their scenes in a large theater secured by Lindsay. Sally changes her scene with Barry mid-performance and portrays herself confidently denouncing Sam, played by Barry; the performance is applauded by the audience, but Sally is dismayed that her acclaim is now founded on a lie. Hank and the Chechens move into a Buddhist monastery previously held by the Burmese and prepare for war with the Burmese and Bolivians. Fuches, seeking protection from Barry, brokers a peace among all three gangs. The police release Gene to his son Leo after finding Hank's Chechen pin on Moss' body, planted there by Barry. Barry is relieved to hear of Gene's release, but then receives a text from Hank revealing Fuches' location. Barry travels to the monastery and kills nearly everyone there in a rage, including Esther and Mayrbek; Fuches escapes while Hank survives. Hank's successor Batir arrives from Chechnya and is pleased with Hank for seemingly killing Esther. Later that evening, Gene suddenly remembers Fuches whispering that Barry killed Moss.

=== Season 3 (2022) ===
No. overall	No. in season	Title	Directed by	Written by	Original release date	U.S. viewers (millions)
17	1	"forgiving jeff"	Bill Hader	Alec Berg & Bill Hader	April 24, 2022	0.249
A depressed Barry returns to contract killing, taking jobs on the Internet while still auditioning for acting work; during one job where his client forgives his target for sleeping with his wife, Barry kills them both. His relationship with Sally has become lifeless, as Sally has become preoccupied with writing and starring in Joplin, a semi-autobiographical TV series. Hank is questioned by the police regarding Moss's murder and the monastery shooting; he diverts their attention away from Barry by identifying Fuches, hiding in Chechnya, as the culprit, claiming he is a high-level Chechen assassin called "the Raven". The police, believing Barry's alibi and unable to verify Fuches's real identity, accept Hank's statement and relay it to Gene, who refuses to believe that Barry is blameless. Barry approaches Hank, who is now in a romantic relationship with Cristobal, and asks him for work, but Hank turns him away. Gene meets privately with Barry and threatens him at gunpoint over Moss's murder, but his prop gun falls apart. Barry subdues Gene and takes him to the outskirts of the city, preparing to execute him. Gene pleads for his life, telling Barry that he can earn his forgiveness. Barry then has an idea, telling Gene to get into the trunk of his car.
18	2	"limonada"	Bill Hader	Alec Berg & Bill Hader	May 1, 2022	0.294
Barry attempts to convince Sally to cast Gene in her show, believing that steady acting work will lighten his spirits and will eventually lead to Gene’s forgiveness. Sally tells Barry her bosses won't allow it, and Barry reacts by viciously shouting at her in the production offices. Barry books another audition through Allison Jones, who also refuses to work with Gene. Cristobal's father-in-law Fernando arrives in LA and organizes a raid on the Chechens' compound. Cristobal tips off Hank, allowing the Chechens to escape before the raid occurs. Cristobal later breaks up with Hank to protect him from danger. Sally is forced to move the premiere of her series up by several weeks to avoid competing with another series, thereby committing her to a grueling press junket. Barry has a successful audition, landing a role for himself and getting a part for Gene as an extra. However, upon leaving the audition, he finds that Gene has escaped from the trunk of his car. Barry intercepts Gene at Leo's house and threatens to kill both Leo and his son if Gene doesn't cooperate.
19	3	"ben mendelsohn"	Alec Berg	Emma Barrie	May 8, 2022	0.299
The Chechens return to their raided heroin operation; Batir, unaware that Cristobal aided their escape, proposes retaliation against the Bolivians. Hank instead proposes bringing Fuches back to the U.S. for assistance, but Fuches refuses, still fearing Barry's wrath. Cristobal successfully convinces Fernando to back down from fighting the Chechens for territory. Batir, meanwhile, buys a bomb to use against the Bolivians, and Hank suggests hiring Barry to carry out the assassination. Sally embarks on her press tour; Katie, a young actress who witnessed Barry's outburst, struggles to convey her concerns about Barry to the production team. Barry and Gene prepare for their roles on the series Laws of Humanity; Gene realizes he inadvertently tipped Janice off to Barry's crimes at the cabin. While filming their scene together, Gene lashes out at Barry and storms off the set. Barry receives a call from Fuches attempting to make amends, but Barry rebuffs him. He later accepts Hank's request to kill Fernando, raising Batir's suspicions. Inspired by a traditional Chechen moralistic story by the owner of the safehouse, Fuches begins plotting revenge against Barry.
20	4	"all the sauces"	Alec Berg	Jason Kim	May 15, 2022	0.270
Fuches returns to the U.S., visiting the families of Barry's victims as his PI persona. He gives Barry's address to both the widow and son of one victim as well as to Ryan Madison's father. Barry places the Chechens' bomb in Cristobal's home to kill Fernando and his men, but his remote detonator app malfunctions. Cristobal returns to the house and is confronted by Fernando, who has learned of his relationship with Hank. Cristobal refuses to cooperate and escapes right as Barry's phone connects and detonates the bomb, injuring Cristobal. Barry returns Cristobal to Hank, who pays him. Gene prepares to flee LA with Leo and his grandson, despite his agent telling him that his reputation has vastly improved after his mentorship of Barry was publicized. After Joplin's premiere – which Barry misses due to his job with Hank – Katie warns Sally that her relationship with Barry is abusive. Barry visits Gene to give him the money he received from Hank, promising to stay out of his life. Barry then visits Sally outside the premiere, where Sally breaks up with him. Elsewhere, the widow, Julie, and her son, Kyle, purchase a firearm to kill Barry.
21	5	"crazytimesh*tshow"	Alec Berg	Emily Heller	May 22, 2022	0.257
Barry's fellow Marine Albert Nguyen, now an FBI Special Agent, consults in the police's investigation into Moss's murder and pushes them to pursue more leads. Barry asks for relationship advice from Hank and Cristobal, who suggest he express himself more sincerely to Sally. Elena, Fernando's daughter and Cristobal's wife, arrives in Los Angeles looking for her father's killer, leading another raid on the Chechens' compound and later kidnapping Cristobal while Hank hides in the closet. Gene attends a dinner party hosted by Joe Mantegna, where he apologizes for his past behavior, but Annie, a theater director he once dated, rebukes him for ruining her career after she left him. Sally is devastated to learn that, after dominating its homepage for twelve hours, Joplin has been canceled by its streaming platform, BanShe, after failing to hit the site's target demographic. Barry tries to console her by suggesting detailed ways to psychologically torment BanShe's CEO, causing a horrified Sally to kick him out. As Barry leaves, Julie and Kyle prepare to kill him, but Julie accidentally shoots Kyle in the stomach and drives off in a panic while Barry walks away.
22	6	"710N"	Bill Hader	Duffy Boudreau	May 29, 2022	0.210
Fuches directs a biker gang led by Taylor's sister Traci to go after Barry. One of the members shoots Fuches and leaves him for dead in the desert; Fuches is tended to by a kindly family that lets him stay with them, but Fuches remains insistent on bringing down Barry. He steals the family's truck and contacts Moss's father Jim. Sally reluctantly accepts a writing job on a different BanShe series, The New Medusas (which supplanted Joplin as BanShe's flagship show). Gene's agent offers him the opportunity to teach a MasterClass acting course; Gene agrees so long as Annie is involved, and offers her the full profits. Albert suggests someone with a military background was involved in Fernando's assassination, and decides to visit Chris's widow Sharon to inquire about Barry. Sharon invites Barry to a dinner that night; on his way there, Barry is attacked by Traci's gang and steals one of their bikes to escape them. At Sharon's, Barry notices Fuches's PI card on her table and realizes too late that Sharon has poisoned his food, her invitation a ruse to avenge Chris's death.
23	7	"candy asses"	Bill Hader	Liz Sarnoff	June 5, 2022	0.261
Sharon flees her house after poisoning Barry, who hallucinates himself approaching a crowd of his past victims on a beach. He is found in a catatonic state by Ryan Madison's father, who considers killing Barry as revenge before committing suicide in a hospital driveway. Hank travels to Bolivia to find Cristobal, only to be captured alongside his fellow Chechens. Sally discovers her former assistant Natalie has become a showrunner at BanShe and lashes out at her in a fit of rage and envy; Natalie films the encounter and posts it online, costing Sally her writing job. Sally later posts an nonpology video in which she defends her actions, and Lindsay drops Sally as a client when she launches into another tirade. Fuches meets Jim Moss to discuss Barry's role in Janice's death, only for Jim to drive Fuches to the police station to be arrested. Filming begins on Gene's MasterClass, although Annie struggles because of her decades-long absence from the industry. After learning that Gene also accused Barry of killing Janice, Jim questions Gene, who unconvincingly covers for Barry. Albert interrogates Fuches with the cameras off; Fuches admits to being Barry's handler and reveals Barry's role in Chris's death.
24	8	"starting now"	Bill Hader	Alec Berg & Bill Hader	June 12, 2022	0.221
Barry leaves the hospital only to find Sally at his apartment asking for his help with getting revenge on Natalie. Barry refuses, but the surviving member of the motocross gang arrives, knocks out Barry, and attempts to kill Sally, who fights him off and beats him to death. Barry tells Sally to go home and that he will take the blame. Fuches is imprisoned. Hank is forced to listen to his fellow Chechens being mauled to death by a panther; he breaks free from his shackles and uses a guard's automatic rifle to kill the panther through a wall before it can break into his cell. Finding Elena subjecting Cristobal to electroshock conversion therapy, Hank kills Elena and rescues Cristobal but remains visibly traumatized. Albert confronts Barry as he is burying the biker but spares him and implores him to stop killing; Barry suffers an emotional breakdown. Barry makes plans with Sally to run away from Los Angeles, unaware she is already traveling alone to Joplin, Missouri. Jim Moss calls him to tell him he spoke with Gene and asks to meet, but Barry refuses. He subsequently calls Gene, who tells him he is going to kill Moss. Barry prepares to kill Moss himself but is ambushed by the police, having been lured by Gene and Moss into getting arrested.

=== Season 4 (2023) ===
No. overall	No. in season	Title	Directed by	Written by	Original release date	U.S. viewers (millions)
25	1	"yikes"	Bill Hader	Bill Hader	April 16, 2023	0.274
When Barry is imprisoned, Fuches, his fellow inmate, fears for his life and wears a wire for the FBI to extract a confession from Barry, who instead apologizes to Fuches for not heeding his judgment on Gene. Gene, meanwhile, is hailed as a hero for his role in Barry's arrest; Jim tells him not to exploit the case for publicity, but Gene arranges a meeting with Vanity Fair reporter Lon O'Neil. Sally is horrified to learn of Barry's crimes as she returns home to her parents, but clashes with her antagonistic mother over her TV series. Hank and Cristobal attempt to start a legitimate business by investing in construction sand. Barry provokes a friendly guard into beating him, prompting visions of his childhood; Fuches finds him and tearfully apologizes for taking advantage of him.
26	2	"bestest place on the earth"	Bill Hader	Nicky Hirsch	April 16, 2023	0.216
Fuches pulls out of his deal with the FBI and attempts to assemble a gang to protect himself and Barry. Sally visits Barry in jail and admits she feels safe around him. Barry offers to inform on the Chechens to the FBI in exchange for being moved to special housing. Sally attempts to return to acting, but Lindsay warns that her options are limited due to her association with Barry and her viral outburst at Natalie. Gene gives O'Neil a heavily embellished retelling of his history with Barry. Sally confronts Gene about not disclosing Barry's murder of Janice; Gene suggests she begin teaching to cope with her trauma. Cristobal attempts to broker peace among warring gangs by hiring them to his and Hank's operation, but Hank makes a surprise proposal to break Barry out of prison. Fuches later calls Hank to tell him Barry is working with the FBI, so Hank resolves to kill Barry.
27	3	"you're charming"	Bill Hader	Emma Barrie	April 23, 2023	0.208
Hank and Cristobal meet a handler named Toro to procure assassins to kill Barry, who in turn is trying to get himself and Sally relocated to witness protection. Batir informs Hank that the Chechen Mafia's elders want him to kill the rival gangs. O'Neil visits Barry in prison to ask about Gene, sending Barry into a rage when he learns what Gene said about him. O'Neil then visits Jim, who terrorizes him into silence. Jim later confronts Gene about publicizing his story and tells him he must be "isolated". Sally teaches an acting class where she attempts to replicate Gene's brash teaching style, disgusting all her students except one, Kristen, who asks her for help with a gig. Barry calls Hank to arrange a hit on Gene, but Hank cuts ties with him. Fuches has a change of heart and attempts to report the hit on Barry. Barry's meeting with WITSEC is derailed when the disguised assassins kill the officers; Barry kills one of the hitmen and escapes the prison.
28	4	"it takes a psycho"	Bill Hader	Taofik Kolade	April 30, 2023	0.303
Fuches is beaten by the prison guards, who believe he aided Barry's escape; this earns him the respect of his fellow inmates. Gene is moved to his cabin but becomes paranoid upon learning of Barry's escape and unknowingly shoots his son Leo in the shoulder when he brings him food. Kristen forgets a line while shooting her part in a superhero film; her agent notices Sally trying to steal the role and offers to hire her, impressed with her talent. Hank buries most of his new associates alive in sand to save himself and Cristobal from being killed by the Chechen elders. Horrified, Cristobal tries to leave Hank but is killed by the Chechens for knowing too much about their operations. Having failed to land the superhero film role, Sally returns to her apartment to find Barry waiting for her, and says they should leave together. Barry and Sally are then shown to be married and living in a remote area with a son.
29	5	"tricky legacies"	Bill Hader	Bill Hader	May 7, 2023	0.279
Eight years have passed since Barry and Sally ran away together, during which they had a son named John. Having taken on new identities, they live a seemingly peaceful life mostly detached from society; however, Barry remains severely paranoid and has raised John with limited knowledge of the outside world, and Sally struggles with her role as a mother, battling depression, alcoholism, and pent-up aggression, which manifests when she chokes coworker Bevel for coming onto her. John learns more about Barry's past when he finds Barry's military shadow box, though Barry whitewashes his actions. A bearded and disheveled Gene, who has been in hiding in Israel for eight years, shows up at Warner Bros. Studios, where he asks to talk to the CEO about an upcoming biopic about Barry and Sally. Sally is outraged as she suspects Gene has become a consultant, and when she tells Barry, he decides he must kill Gene.
30	6	"the wizard"	Bill Hader	Duffy Boudreau	May 14, 2023	0.232
Despite Sally's protests, Barry travels to Los Angeles intent on killing Gene. Fuches, now a hardened gang leader, is released from prison and visits Hank, who now runs a successful sand importation company called Nohobal. Although Hank believes Barry to be dead, he agrees to hire Fuches's gang as Nohobal security in exchange for an opportunity to kill Barry. Hank terminates the agreement when a drunk Fuches congratulates him for indirectly causing Cristobal's death. During a meeting with a studio executive, Gene is summoned to meet with District Attorney Buckner and explains that he came out of hiding to prevent the production of a biopic glorifying Barry or disgracing Janice. He visits Leo to apologize for shooting him. While home alone with John, Sally hears Shane Taylor's voice outside threatening them and hallucinates an attack from the biker she killed. She finds part of the house damaged for real, and John awakes later to hear Sally leave Barry a voicemail, begging him to return, and repeatedly using his real name. Barry arrives at Gene's house to kill him, only to be captured and find himself seated before Jim.
31	7	"a nice meal"	Bill Hader	Liz Sarnoff	May 21, 2023	0.237
After Hank fails to kill Fuches multiple times, he instead decides to help Fuches kill Barry by kidnapping Gene and using him as bait. Gene reconsiders his plan to kill the movie when he learns from an agent that Daniel Day-Lewis wants to play him. Sally, who has flown with John to Los Angeles in a panic, calls Gene, who tells her to wait for him at his house. Hank's men arrive and decide to kidnap Sally and John instead of Gene. Meanwhile, Jim subjects Barry to psychological torture, during which he learns about the $250,000 Barry gave to Gene. The theatrical agent who talked to Gene turns out to be a former acting student, who leads Gene to Jim, Leo, and Buckner, all of whom now believe Gene was working with the Chechens and manipulated Barry into killing Janice to stop her investigation. Barry escapes from captivity and receives a call from Hank, who tells him they must meet or else Sally and John will die.
32	8	"wow"	Bill Hader	Bill Hader	May 28, 2023	0.234
Sally confesses to John that she and Barry are fugitives. When Hank shows Fuches that he has them hostage, Fuches takes his men to Nohobal and offers to disappear if Hank admits to killing Cristobal. Hank refuses and is mortally wounded by Fuches; a shootout erupts, leaving Fuches as the last gangster standing. A heavily armed Barry arrives, but Fuches allows him to leave unharmed with his family before disappearing. Hank dies shortly thereafter. Jim and Buckner publicly condemn Gene as the prime suspect in Janice's re-opened case. Sally, concerned that Gene might go to prison for Janice's death, urges Barry to turn himself in, but he claims that their survival means he has been "redeemed." She leaves with John while Barry is asleep, and he searches for them at Gene's house. Just as Gene's talent agent Tom convinces Barry to turn himself in, a vengeful Gene shoots Barry dead. Years later, Sally is a high school theater teacher, yet still a distant and cold mother, and a well-adjusted teenage John watches The Mask Collector, the biopic about Barry, which depicts Gene as a villain and Barry as a tragic hero. The biopic's epilogue states that Gene was sentenced to life in prison and Barry was buried in Arlington with full honors.

== Production ==
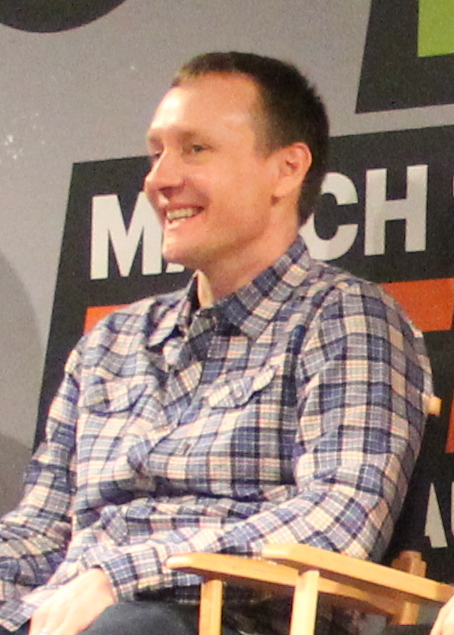
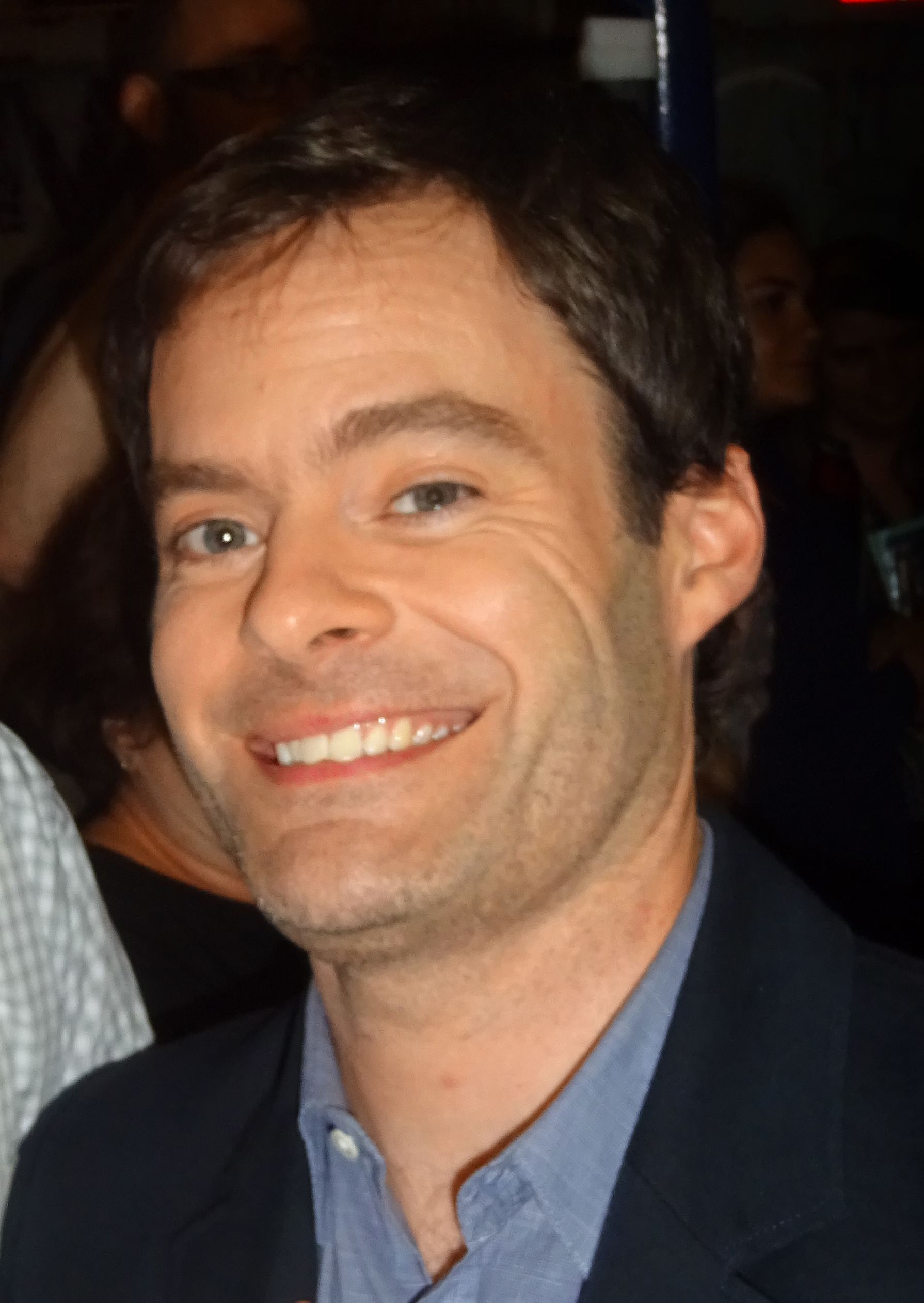
The series was co-created by Alec Berg and Bill Hader, who also serve as writers, producers, and directors.

=== Development ===
On January 11, 2016, it was reported that HBO had given the production a pilot order, to be directed by Bill Hader who would also co-write and executive produce alongside Alec Berg. On June 2, 2016, it was reported that HBO had given the production a series order. On April 12, 2018, HBO renewed the series for a second season, which premiered on March 31, 2019. On April 10, 2019, HBO renewed the series for a third season which premiered on April 24, 2022. On May 19, 2022, HBO renewed the series for an eight-episode fourth season with Hader directing all eight episodes. In March 2023, it was confirmed that season four would be its last.

=== Casting ===
Alongside the report of the pilot order, it was confirmed that Hader would star in the pilot. In February 2016, it was reported that Sarah Goldberg, Glenn Fleshler, Anthony Carrigan, Henry Winkler, and Stephen Root had been cast in lead roles in the series' pilot. For the third season, Sarah Burns was promoted to series regular after having a recurring role in the second season.

=== Filming ===
Principal photography for the first season began in 2017 in Los Angeles. The second season filmed from September 2018 to December 2018.

Production on the third season was shut down on March 18, 2020, due to the COVID-19 pandemic, before a single episode had been shot. The cast had already gathered for table reads for the first two episodes when they were informed. In January 2021, Hader revealed that scripts for seasons 3 and 4 had been written. Filming for the third season began in August 2021. Production on the fourth season began in June 2022 in Los Angeles.

== Release ==
=== Marketing ===
On December 4, 2017, HBO released the first teaser trailer for the series. On January 9, 2018, HBO released the first official trailer for the series.

=== Premiere ===
On March 21, 2018, the series held its official premiere at NeueHouse Hollywood in Los Angeles, California.

On April 28, 2018, episodes one through three were screened during the Series Mania Festival at the Le Majestic cinema in Lille, France. It appeared alongside seven other television programs in the festival's "Best of USA" series of shows.

== Reception ==
=== Critical response ===
Critical response of Barry
Season	Rotten Tomatoes	Metacritic
1	98% (82 reviews)	84 (30 reviews)
2	100% (42 reviews)	87 (14 reviews)
3	99% (111 reviews)	94 (19 reviews)
4	96% (119 reviews)	90 (23 reviews)

All four seasons of Barry have received critical acclaim. On the review aggregation website Rotten Tomatoes, the overall series holds a 98% rating. Meanwhile, on Metacritic, which uses a weighted average, the overall series received a score of 88 out of 100. Some critics have labeled it as one of the best television series of all time. In various publications' lists of the 100 greatest TV shows of all time, it placed no. 91 by Empire, no. 53 by IGN, and no. 52 by Rolling Stone.

On Rotten Tomatoes, the first season holds a 98% rating with an average rating of 8.1/10, based on 82 reviews. The website's critical consensus reads, "PTSD and comedy make strangely endearing bedfellows in Barry, which proves more poignant than its sketch show premise." Metacritic assigned the season a score of 84 out of 100 based on 30 critics, indicating "universal acclaim".

On Rotten Tomatoes, the second season holds a 100% rating with an average rating of 8.8/10, based on 42 reviews. The website's consensus reads, "Barry follows up a pitch-perfect debut with a second season that balances darkness with comedy while steering clear of antihero overindulgence." On Metacritic, the season has a score 87 out of 100, based on 14 critics, indicating "universal acclaim".

On Rotten Tomatoes, the third season holds a 99% rating with an average rating of 9.05/10, based on 111 reviews. The website's critics consensus states, "Bill Hader and company can take a well-deserved bow—Barry makes its belated return to the screen without missing a step, retaining its edge as one of television’s funniest and most unsettling offerings." On Metacritic, the season has a score 94 out of 100, based on 19 critics, indicating "universal acclaim".

On Rotten Tomatoes, the fourth season holds a 96% rating with an average rating of 9.05/10, based on 119 reviews. The website's critics consensus states, "What began as a macabre comedy is now close to completely shorn of genuine mirth, but Bill Hader's masterful indictment of stardom closes the curtain with one hell of an encore." On Metacritic, the season has a score 90 out of 100, based on 23 critics, indicating "universal acclaim".

=== Ratings ===
==== Season 1 ====
Viewership and ratings per episode of Barry
No.	Title	Air date	Rating (18–49)	Viewers (millions)	DVR (18–49)	DVR viewers (millions)	Total (18–49)	Total viewers (millions)
1	"Chapter One: Make Your Mark"	March 25, 2018	0.2	0.564	—N/a	0.538	—N/a	1.103
2	"Chapter Two: Use It"	April 1, 2018	0.2	0.641	—N/a	—N/a	—N/a	—N/a
3	"Chapter Three: Make the Unsafe Choice"	April 8, 2018	0.2	0.595	0.2	0.555	0.4	1.150
4	"Chapter Four: Commit...To You"	April 15, 2018	0.2	0.511	0.2	0.565	0.4	1.077
5	"Chapter Five: Do Your Job"	April 22, 2018	0.2	0.643	—N/a	—N/a	—N/a	—N/a
6	"Chapter Six: Listen With Your Ears, React With Your Face"	April 29, 2018	0.2	0.560	—N/a	—N/a	—N/a	—N/a
7	"Chapter Seven: Loud, Fast, and Keep Going"	May 6, 2018	0.2	0.636	—N/a	—N/a	—N/a	—N/a
8	"Chapter Eight: Know Your Truth"	May 13, 2018	0.2	0.548	0.2	0.523	0.4	1.072

==== Season 2 ====
Viewership and ratings per episode of Barry
No.	Title	Air date	Rating (18–49)	Viewers (millions)	DVR (18–49)	DVR viewers (millions)	Total (18–49)	Total viewers (millions)
1	"The Show Must Go On, Probably?"	March 31, 2019	0.2	0.532	—N/a	0.428	—N/a	0.960
2	"The Power of No"	April 7, 2019	0.2	0.424	—N/a	—N/a	—N/a	—N/a
3	"Past = Present x Future Over Yesterday"	April 14, 2019	0.7	1.78	0.2	—N/a	0.9	—N/a
4	"What?!"	April 21, 2019	0.8	1.94	—N/a	—N/a	—N/a	—N/a
5	"ronny/lily"	April 28, 2019	0.9	2.03	—N/a	—N/a	—N/a	—N/a
6	"The Truth Has a Ring to It"	May 5, 2019	0.8	1.99	—N/a	0.59	—N/a	2.58
7	"The Audition"	May 12, 2019	0.8	1.87	—N/a	—N/a	—N/a	—N/a
8	"berkman > block"	May 19, 2019	0.9	2.21	—N/a	—N/a	—N/a	—N/a

=== Awards and nominations ===
Year	Award	Category	Nominee(s)	Result	Ref.
2018	Television Critics Association Awards	Outstanding Achievement in Comedy	Barry	Nominated	
2018	Television Critics Association Awards	Outstanding New Program	Barry	Nominated	
2018	Television Critics Association Awards	Individual Achievement in Comedy	Bill Hader	Nominated	
2018	Primetime Emmy Awards	Outstanding Comedy Series	Alec Berg, Bill Hader, Emily Heller, Aida Rodgers, and Liz Sarnoff	Nominated	
2018	Primetime Emmy Awards	Outstanding Lead Actor in a Comedy Series	Bill Hader (for "Chapter Seven: Loud, Fast And Keep Going")	Won	
2018	Primetime Emmy Awards	Outstanding Supporting Actor in a Comedy Series	Henry Winkler (for "Chapter Four: Commit To You")	Won	
2018	Primetime Emmy Awards	Outstanding Directing for a Comedy Series	Bill Hader (for "Chapter One: Make Your Mark")	Nominated	
2018	Primetime Emmy Awards	Outstanding Writing for a Comedy Series	Alec Berg and Bill Hader (for "Chapter One: Make Your Mark")	Nominated	
2018	Primetime Emmy Awards	Outstanding Writing for a Comedy Series	Liz Sarnoff (for "Chapter Seven: Loud, Fast And Keep Going")	Nominated	
2018	Primetime Creative Arts Emmy Awards	Outstanding Casting for a Comedy Series	Sharon Bialy and Sherry Thomas	Nominated	
2018	Primetime Creative Arts Emmy Awards	Outstanding Cinematography for a Single-Camera Series (Half-Hour)	Paula Huidobro (for "Chapter Eight: Know Your Truth")	Nominated	
2018	Primetime Creative Arts Emmy Awards	Outstanding Production Design for a Narrative Program (Half-Hour or Less)	Tyler B. Robinson, Eric Schoonover, and Amber Haley (for "Chapter Seven: Loud, Fast And Keep Going")	Nominated	
2018	Primetime Creative Arts Emmy Awards	Outstanding Single-Camera Picture Editing for a Comedy Series	Jeff Buchanan (for "Chapter Seven: Loud, Fast And Keep Going")	Nominated	
2018	Primetime Creative Arts Emmy Awards	Outstanding Single-Camera Picture Editing for a Comedy Series	Kyle Reiter (for "Chapter Eight: Know Your Truth")	Nominated	
2018	Primetime Creative Arts Emmy Awards	Outstanding Sound Editing for a Comedy or Drama Series (Half-Hour) and Animation	Matthew E. Taylor, Sean Heissinger, Rickley W. Dumm, Michael Brake, Hilda Hodges, and Rick Owens (for "Chapter Seven: Loud, Fast And Keep Going")	Nominated	
2018	Primetime Creative Arts Emmy Awards	Outstanding Sound Mixing for a Comedy or Drama Series (Half-Hour) and Animation	Todd Beckett, Elmo Ponsdomenech, and Benjamin Patrick (for "Chapter Seven: Loud, Fast And Keep Going")	Won	
2018	American Film Institute Awards	Top 10 TV Programs of the Year	Barry	Won	
2019	Golden Globe Awards	Best Television Series – Musical or Comedy	Barry	Nominated	
2019	Golden Globe Awards	Best Actor in a Television Series – Musical or Comedy	Bill Hader	Nominated	
2019	Golden Globe Awards	Best Supporting Actor – Series, Miniseries or Television Film	Henry Winkler	Nominated	
2019	Dorian Awards	TV Comedy of the Year	Barry	Nominated	
2019	Critics' Choice Awards	Best Comedy Series	Barry	Nominated	
2019	Critics' Choice Awards	Best Actor in a Comedy Series	Bill Hader	Won	
2019	Critics' Choice Awards	Best Supporting Actor in a Comedy Series	Henry Winkler	Won	
2019	Producers Guild of America Awards	Best Episodic Comedy	Alec Berg, Bill Hader, Aida Rodgers, Emily Heller, and Liz Sarnoff	Nominated	
2019	Screen Actors Guild Awards	Outstanding Performance by an Ensemble in a Comedy Series	Darrell Britt-Gibson, D'Arcy Carden, Andy Carey, Anthony Carrigan, Rightor Doyle, Glenn Fleshler, Alejandro Furth, Sarah Goldberg, Bill Hader, Kirby Howell-Baptiste, Paula Newsome, John Pirruccello, Stephen Root, and Henry Winkler	Nominated	
2019	Screen Actors Guild Awards	Outstanding Performance by a Male Actor in a Comedy Series	Bill Hader	Nominated	
2019	Screen Actors Guild Awards	Outstanding Performance by a Male Actor in a Comedy Series	Henry Winkler	Nominated	
2019	Artios Awards	Outstanding Achievement in Casting – Television Pilot & First Season — Comedy	Sherry Thomas, Sharon Bialy, and Stacia Kimler	Nominated	
2019	American Cinema Editors Eddie Awards	Best Edited Comedy Series for Non-Commercial Television	Jeff Buchanan (for "Chapter One: Make Your Mark")	Nominated	
2019	Directors Guild of America Awards	Outstanding Directorial Achievement in Comedy Series	Bill Hader (for "Chapter One: Make Your Mark")	Won	
2019	Cinema Audio Society Awards	Outstanding Achievement in Sound Mixing for Television Series – Half Hour	Benjamin A. Patrick, Elmo Ponsdomenech, Todd Beckett, David Wingo, Aaron Hasson, and John Sanacore (for "Chapter Seven: Loud, Fast, and Keep Going")	Nominated	
2019	Golden Reel Awards	Broadcast Media: Live Action Under 35:00	TBA (for "Chapter Seven: Loud, Fast, and Keep Going")	Nominated	
2019	Writers Guild of America Awards	Television: Comedy Series	Alec Berg, Duffy Boudreau, Bill Hader, Emily Heller, Liz Sarnoff, Ben Smith, and Sarah Solemani	Nominated	
2019	Writers Guild of America Awards	Television: New Series	Alec Berg, Duffy Boudreau, Bill Hader, Emily Heller, Liz Sarnoff, Ben Smith, and Sarah Solemani	Won	
2019	Writers Guild of America Awards	Television: Episodic Comedy	Alec Berg and Bill Hader (for "Chapter One: Make Your Mark")	Won	
2019	Satellite Awards	Best Television Series – Musical or Comedy	Barry	Nominated	
2019	Satellite Awards	Best Actor in a Television Series – Musical or Comedy	Bill Hader	Won	
2019	Shorty Awards	Best TV Show	Barry	Nominated	
2019	Peabody Awards	Entertainment	Barry	Won	
2019	Television Critics Association Awards	Outstanding Achievement in Comedy	Barry	Nominated	
2019	Television Critics Association Awards	Individual Achievement in Comedy	Bill Hader	Nominated	
2019	Primetime Emmy Awards	Outstanding Comedy Series	Alec Berg, Bill Hader, Aida Rodgers, Emily Heller, Julie Camino, Jason Kim, and Liz Sarnoff	Nominated	
2019	Primetime Emmy Awards	Outstanding Lead Actor in a Comedy Series	Bill Hader (for "The Truth Has A Ring To It")	Won	
2019	Primetime Emmy Awards	Outstanding Supporting Actor in a Comedy Series	Anthony Carrigan	Nominated	
2019	Primetime Emmy Awards	Outstanding Supporting Actor in a Comedy Series	Stephen Root	Nominated	
2019	Primetime Emmy Awards	Outstanding Supporting Actor in a Comedy Series	Henry Winkler	Nominated	
2019	Primetime Emmy Awards	Outstanding Supporting Actress in a Comedy Series	Sarah Goldberg	Nominated	
2019	Primetime Emmy Awards	Outstanding Directing for a Comedy Series	Alec Berg (for "The Audition")	Nominated	
2019	Primetime Emmy Awards	Outstanding Directing for a Comedy Series	Bill Hader (for "ronny/lily")	Nominated	
2019	Primetime Emmy Awards	Outstanding Writing for a Comedy Series	Alec Berg and Bill Hader (for "ronny/lily")	Nominated	
2019	Primetime Creative Arts Emmy Awards	Outstanding Casting for a Comedy Series	Sharon Bialy and Sherry Thomas	Nominated	
2019	Primetime Creative Arts Emmy Awards	Outstanding Music Composition for a Series (Original Dramatic Score)	David Wingo (for "What?")	Nominated	
2019	Primetime Creative Arts Emmy Awards	Outstanding Production Design for a Narrative Program (Half-Hour or Less)	Tyler B. Robinson, Eric Schoonover, and Rachael Ferrara (for "ronny/lily")	Nominated	
2019	Primetime Creative Arts Emmy Awards	Outstanding Single-Camera Picture Editing for a Comedy Series	Jeff Buchanan (for "ronny/lily")	Nominated	
2019	Primetime Creative Arts Emmy Awards	Outstanding Single-Camera Picture Editing for a Comedy Series	Kyle Reiter (for "berkman > block")	Nominated	
2019	Primetime Creative Arts Emmy Awards	Outstanding Sound Editing for a Comedy or Drama Series (Half-Hour) and Animation	Matthew E. Taylor, Mark Allen, Rickley W. Dumm, John Creed, Harrison Meyle, Michael Brake, Clayton Weber, Alyson Dee Moore, and Chris Moriana (for "ronny/lily")	Won	
2019	Primetime Creative Arts Emmy Awards	Outstanding Sound Mixing for a Comedy or Drama Series (Half-Hour) and Animation	Jason "Frenchie" Gaya, Elmo Ponsdomenech, Aaron Hasson, and Benjamin Patrick (for "ronny/lily")	Won	
2019	Primetime Creative Arts Emmy Awards	Outstanding Stunt Coordination for a Comedy Series or Variety Program	Wade Allen	Nominated	
2019	Satellite Awards	Best Musical or Comedy Series	Barry	Nominated	
2019	Satellite Awards	Best Actor in a Musical or Comedy	Bill Hader	Nominated	
2020	Golden Globe Awards	Best Television Series – Musical or Comedy	Barry	Nominated	
2020	Golden Globe Awards	Best Actor in a Television Series – Musical or Comedy	Bill Hader	Nominated	
2020	Golden Globe Awards	Best Supporting Actor – Series, Miniseries or Television Film	Henry Winkler	Nominated	
2020	Critics' Choice Awards	Best Comedy Series	Barry	Nominated	
2020	Critics' Choice Awards	Best Actor in a Comedy Series	Bill Hader	Won	
2020	Critics' Choice Awards	Best Supporting Actor in a Comedy Series	Anthony Carrigan	Nominated	
2020	Critics' Choice Awards	Best Supporting Actor in a Comedy Series	Henry Winkler	Nominated	
2020	Producers Guild of America Awards	Best Episodic Comedy	Alec Berg, Bill Hader, Aida Rodgers, Elizabeth Sarnoff, Emily Heller, Julie Camino, and Jason Kim	Nominated	
2020	Directors Guild of America Awards	Outstanding Directorial Achievement in Comedy Series	Bill Hader (for "ronny/lily")	Won	
2020	Screen Actors Guild Awards	Outstanding Performance by an Ensemble in a Comedy Series	Nikita Bogolyubov, Darrell Britt-Gibson, D'Arcy Carden, Andy Carey, Anthony Carrigan, Troy Caylak, Rightor Doyle, Patricia Fa'Asua, Alejandro Furth, Sarah Goldberg, Nick Gracer, Bill Hader, Kirby Howell-Baptiste, Michael Irby, John Pirruccello, Stephen Root, and Henry Winkler	Nominated	
2020	Screen Actors Guild Awards	Outstanding Performance by a Male Actor in a Comedy Series	Bill Hader	Nominated	
2020	Cinema Audio Society Awards	Outstanding Achievement in Sound Mixing for Television Series – Half Hour	Benjamin A. Patrick, Elmo Ponsdomenech, Jason "Frenchie" Gaya, Aaron Hasson, and John Sanacore (for "ronny/lily")	Won (Note: Tied with Fleabag.)	
2020	Casting Society of America	Television Series – Comedy	Sherry Thomas, Sharon Bialy, and Stacia Kimler	Nominated	
2020	Art Directors Guild Awards	Half-Hour Single-Camera Series	Tyler B. Robinson (for "ronny/lily")	Nominated	
2020	Writers Guild of America Awards	Television: Comedy Series	Alec Berg, Duffy Boudreau, Bill Hader, Emily Heller, Jason Kim, Taofik Kolade, and Elizabeth Sarnoff	Won	
2022	Television Critics Association Awards	Outstanding Achievement in Comedy	Barry	Nominated	
2022	Television Critics Association Awards	Individual Achievement in Comedy	Bill Hader	Nominated	
2022	Hollywood Critics Association TV Awards	Best Cable Series, Comedy	Barry	Nominated	
2022	Hollywood Critics Association TV Awards	Best Actor in a Broadcast Network or Cable Series, Comedy	Bill Hader	Won	
2022	Hollywood Critics Association TV Awards	Best Supporting Actor in a Broadcast Network or Cable Series, Comedy	Anthony Carrigan	Nominated	
2022	Hollywood Critics Association TV Awards	Best Supporting Actor in a Broadcast Network or Cable Series, Comedy	Henry Winkler	Won	
2022	Hollywood Critics Association TV Awards	Best Supporting Actress in a Broadcast Network or Cable Series, Comedy	D'Arcy Carden	Nominated	
2022	Hollywood Critics Association TV Awards	Best Supporting Actress in a Broadcast Network or Cable Series, Comedy	Sarah Goldberg	Nominated	
2022	Hollywood Critics Association TV Awards	Best Directing in a Broadcast Network or Cable Series, Comedy	Bill Hader (for "710N")	Won	
2022	Hollywood Critics Association TV Awards	Best Writing in a Broadcast Network or Cable Series, Comedy	Alec Berg and Bill Hader (for "starting now")	Nominated	
2022	Hollywood Critics Association TV Awards	Best Writing in a Broadcast Network or Cable Series, Comedy	Liz Sarnoff (for "candy asses")	Nominated	
2022	Primetime Emmy Awards	Outstanding Comedy Series	Alec Berg, Bill Hader, Aida Rodgers, Liz Sarnoff, Emily Heller, Jason Kim, Duffy Boudreau, and Julie Camino	Nominated	
2022	Primetime Emmy Awards	Outstanding Lead Actor in a Comedy Series	Bill Hader (for "starting now")	Nominated	
2022	Primetime Emmy Awards	Outstanding Supporting Actor in a Comedy Series	Anthony Carrigan (for "forgiving jeff")	Nominated	
2022	Primetime Emmy Awards	Outstanding Supporting Actor in a Comedy Series	Henry Winkler (for "starting now")	Nominated	
2022	Primetime Emmy Awards	Outstanding Directing for a Comedy Series	Bill Hader (for "710N")	Nominated	
2022	Primetime Emmy Awards	Outstanding Writing for a Comedy Series	Duffy Boudreau (for "710N")	Nominated	
2022	Primetime Emmy Awards	Outstanding Writing for a Comedy Series	Alec Berg and Bill Hader (for "starting now")	Nominated	
2022	Primetime Creative Arts Emmy Awards	Outstanding Casting for a Comedy Series	Sharon Bialy and Sherry Thomas	Nominated	
2022	Primetime Creative Arts Emmy Awards	Outstanding Cinematography for a Single-Camera Series (Half-Hour)	Carl Herse (for "starting now")	Nominated	
2022	Primetime Creative Arts Emmy Awards	Outstanding Single-Camera Picture Editing for a Comedy Series	Ali Greer (for "starting now")	Won	
2022	Primetime Creative Arts Emmy Awards	Outstanding Sound Editing for a Comedy or Drama Series (Half-Hour) and Animation	Sean Heissinger, Matthew E. Taylor, John Creed, Rickley W. Dumm, Clay Weber, Darrin Mann, Michael Brake, Alyson Dee Moore, and Chris Moriana (for "starting now")	Won	
2022	Primetime Creative Arts Emmy Awards	Outstanding Sound Mixing for a Comedy or Drama Series (Half-Hour) and Animation	Elmo Ponsdomenech, Teddy Salas, and Scott Harber (for "all the sauces")	Nominated	
2022	Primetime Creative Arts Emmy Awards	Outstanding Stunt Coordination for a Comedy Series or Variety Program	Wade Allen	Won	
2022	Primetime Creative Arts Emmy Awards	Outstanding Stunt Performance	Clay Cullen, David Castillo, Jolene Van Vugt, and Chris Morrison (for "710N")	Nominated	
2023	American Society of Cinematographers Awards	Outstanding Achievement in Cinematography in an Episode of a Half-Hour Television Series	Carl Herse (for "starting now")	Won	
2023	Artios Awards	Outstanding Achievement in Casting – Television Comedy Series	Sherry Thomas, Sharon Bialy, Stacia Kimler	Nominated	
2023	Cinema Audio Society Awards	Outstanding Achievement in Sound Mixing for Television Series – Half Hour	Scott Harber, Elmo Ponsdomenech, Teddy Salas, Sean Heissinger, David Wingo, Howard London, Darrin Mann (for "starting now")	Nominated	
2023	Critics' Choice Awards	Best Comedy Series	Barry	Nominated	
2023	Critics' Choice Awards	Best Actor in a Comedy Series	Bill Hader	Nominated	
2023	Critics' Choice Awards	Best Supporting Actor in a Comedy Series	Henry Winkler	Won	
2023	Directors Guild of America Awards	Outstanding Directorial Achievement in a Comedy Series	Bill Hader (for "710N")	Won	
2023	Golden Globe Awards	Best Actor in a Television Series – Musical or Comedy	Bill Hader	Nominated	
2023	Golden Globe Awards	Best Supporting Actor in a Television Series – Musical/Comedy or Drama	Henry Winkler	Nominated	
2023	Golden Reel Awards	Outstanding Achievement in Sound Editing – Broadcast Short Form	Sean Heissinger, Matthew E. Taylor, Rickley W. Dumm, Deron Street, Candice Brunello, Charles Campagna, John Creed, Darrin Mann, Clay Weber, Alyson Dee Moore, Chris Moriana (for "710N")	Nominated	
2023	Producers Guild of America Awards	Best Episodic Comedy	Barry	Nominated	
2023	Satellite Awards	Best Comedy or Musical Series	Barry	Won	
2023	Satellite Awards	Best Actor in a Comedy or Musical Series	Bill Hader	Won	
2023	Screen Actors Guild Awards	Outstanding Performance by an Ensemble in a Comedy Series	Sarah Burns, D'Arcy Carden, Anthony Carrigan, Turhan Troy Caylak, Sarah Goldberg, Nick Gracer, Bill Hader, Jessy Hodges, Michael Irby, Gary Kraus, Stephen Root, and Henry Winkler	Nominated	
2023	Screen Actors Guild Awards	Outstanding Performance by a Male Actor in a Comedy Series	Anthony Carrigan	Nominated	
2023	Screen Actors Guild Awards	Outstanding Performance by a Male Actor in a Comedy Series	Bill Hader	Nominated	
2023	Television Critics Association Awards	Outstanding Achievement in Comedy	Barry	Nominated	
2023	Television Critics Association Awards	Individual Achievement in Comedy	Bill Hader	Nominated	
2023	Writers Guild of America Awards	Television: Comedy Series	Emma Barrie, Alec Berg, Duffy Boudreau, Bill Hader, Emily Heller, Nicky Hirschhorn, Jason Kim, Liz Sarnoff	Nominated	
2024	AARP Movies for Grownups Awards	Best Actor	Henry Winkler	Nominated	
2024	Artios Awards	Outstanding Achievement in Casting – Television Comedy Series	Sherry Thomas, Sharon Bialy, Stacia Kimler	Nominated	
2024	American Cinema Editors	Best Comedy Drama Series	Ali Greer and Franky Guttman (for "wow")	Nominated	
2024	American Society of Cinematographers Awards	Outstanding Achievement in Cinematography in Episode of a Half Hour Series for Television	Carl Herse (for "tricky legacies")	Won	
2024	Critics' Choice Television Awards	Best Comedy Series	Barry	Nominated	
2024	Critics' Choice Television Awards	Best Actor in a Comedy Series	Bill Hader	Nominated	
2024	Critics' Choice Television Awards	Best Supporting Actor in a Comedy Series	Henry Winkler	Nominated	
2024	Golden Globe Awards	Best Television Series – Musical or Comedy	Barry	Nominated	
2024	Golden Globe Awards	Best Actor – Television Series Musical or Comedy	Bill Hader	Nominated	
2024	Golden Reel Awards	Outstanding Achievement in Sound Editing – Broadcast Short Form	Sean Heissinger, Matthew E. Taylor, Rickley W. Dumm, Deron Street, John Creed, Clay Weber, Darrin Mann, Alyson Dee Moore, Chris Moriana (for "wow")	Nominated	
2024	Hollywood Critics Association TV Awards	Best Cable Series, Comedy	Barry	Nominated	
2024	Hollywood Critics Association TV Awards	Best Actor in a Broadcast Network or Cable Series, Comedy	Bill Hader	Nominated	
2024	Hollywood Critics Association TV Awards	Best Supporting Actor in a Broadcast Network or Cable Series, Comedy	Henry Winkler	Nominated	
2024	Hollywood Critics Association TV Awards	Best Supporting Actress in a Broadcast Network or Cable Series, Comedy	Sarah Goldberg	Nominated	
2024	Hollywood Critics Association TV Awards	Best Directing in a Broadcast Network or Cable Series, Comedy	Bill Hader (for "wow")	Nominated	
2024	Hollywood Critics Association TV Awards	Best Writing in a Broadcast Network or Cable Series, Comedy	Bill Hader (for "wow")	Nominated	
2024	Hollywood Critics Association Creative Arts TV Awards	Best Casting in a Comedy Series	Barry	Nominated	
2024	Hollywood Critics Association Creative Arts TV Awards	Best Guest Actress in a Comedy Series	D'Arcy Carden	Nominated	
2024	Primetime Emmy Awards	Outstanding Comedy Series	Barry	Nominated	
2024	Primetime Emmy Awards	Outstanding Lead Actor in a Comedy Series	Bill Hader	Nominated	
2024	Primetime Emmy Awards	Outstanding Supporting Actor in a Comedy Series	Anthony Carrigan	Nominated	
2024	Primetime Emmy Awards	Outstanding Supporting Actor in a Comedy Series	Henry Winkler	Nominated	
2024	Primetime Emmy Awards	Outstanding Directing for a Comedy Series	Bill Hader (for "wow")	Nominated	
2024	Primetime Emmy Awards	Outstanding Writing for a Comedy Series	Bill Hader (for "wow")	Nominated	
2024	Primetime Creative Arts Emmy Awards	Outstanding Cinematography for a Series (Half-Hour)	Carl Herse (for "tricky legacies")	Nominated	
2024	Primetime Creative Arts Emmy Awards	Outstanding Picture Editing for a Single-Camera Comedy Series	Franky Guttman and Ali Greer (for "wow")	Nominated	
2024	Primetime Creative Arts Emmy Awards	Outstanding Sound Editing for a Comedy or Drama Series (Half-Hour) and Animation	Sean Heissinger, Matthew E. Taylor, John Creed, Rickley W. Dumm, Deron Street, Clay Weber, Michael Brake, Darrin Mann, Alyson Dee Moore, and Chris Moriana (for "wow")	Nominated	
2024	Primetime Creative Arts Emmy Awards	Outstanding Sound Mixing for a Comedy or Drama Series (Half-Hour) and Animation	Elmo Ponsdomenech, Teddy Salas, Scott Harber, and Aaron Hasson (for "wow")	Nominated	
2024	Primetime Creative Arts Emmy Awards	Outstanding Stunt Coordination for a Comedy Series or Variety Program	Wade Allen	Won	
2024	Producers Guild of America Awards	Best Episodic Comedy	Barry	Nominated	
2024	Directors Guild of America Awards	Outstanding Directorial Achievement in a Comedy Series	Bill Hader (for "wow")	Nominated	
2024	Satellite Awards	Best Comedy or Musical Series	Barry	Nominated	
2024	Satellite Awards	Best Actor in a Comedy or Musical Series	Bill Hader	Nominated	
2024	Screen Actors Guild Awards	Outstanding Performance by an Ensemble in a Comedy Series	Anthony Carrigan, Sarah Goldberg, Zachary Golinger, Bill Hader, Andre Hyland, Fred Melamed, Charles Parnell, Stephen Root, Tobie Windham, Henry Winkler, and Robert Wisdom	Nominated	
2024	Screen Actors Guild Awards	Outstanding Performance by a Male Actor in a Comedy Series	Bill Hader	Nominated	
2024	Screen Actors Guild Awards	Outstanding Performance by a Stunt Ensemble in a Television Series	Barry	Nominated	
2024	Writers Guild of America Awards	Television: Comedy Series	Emma Barrie, Alec Berg, Duffy Boudreau, Bill Hader, Emily Heller, Nicky Hirschhorn, Jason Kim, Liz Sarnoff	Nominated	
