= Chapter Four: Commit... to YOU =

- Barry episode
- Episode no.: Season 1 Episode 4
- Directed by: Maggie Carey
- Written by: Sarah Solemani
- Cinematography by: Paula Huidobro
- Editing by: Kyle Reiter
- Original air date: April 15, 2018
- Running time: 32 minutes

Guest appearances
- Jon Hamm as himself; Paula Newsome as Detective Janice Moss; Robert Curtis Brown as Mike Hallman; Chris Marquette as Chris Lucado; John Pirruccello as Detective John Loach; Darrell Britt-Gibson as Jermaine Jefrint; D'Arcy Carden as Natalie Greer; Andy Carey as Eric; Rightor Doyle as Nick Nicholby; Alejandro Furth as Antonio Manuel; Kirby Howell-Baptiste as Sasha Baxter; Dimiter D. Marinov as Abbas; Dale Pavinski as Taylor Garrett; Ross Philips as Zach Burrows

Episode chronology
← Previous "Chapter Three: Make the Unsafe Choice"	Next → "Chapter Five: Do Your Job"

"Chapter Four: Commit... to YOU" is the fourth episode of the first season of the American crime tragicomedy television series Barry. The episode was written by co-producer Sarah Solemani, and directed by Maggie Carey. It was first broadcast on HBO in the United States on April 15, 2018.

The series follows Barry Berkman, a hitman from Cleveland who travels to Los Angeles to kill someone but finds himself joining an acting class taught by Gene Cousineau, where he meets aspiring actress Sally Reed and begins to question his path in life as he deals with his criminal associates such as Monroe Fuches and NoHo Hank. In the episode, Barry reconnects with an old friend from the Marines, although his relationship with Sally may take a turn for the worse. Meanwhile, Moss meets with Gene for information on Ryan Madison's murder, although Gene uses it as a date instead.

According to Nielsen Media Research, the episode was seen by an estimated 0.511 million household viewers and gained a 0.2 ratings share among adults aged 18–49. The episode received positive reviews from critics, who praised the character development and performances, with many highlighting Henry Winkler. For this episode, Winkler won the Primetime Emmy Award for Outstanding Supporting Actor in a Comedy Series at the 70th Primetime Emmy Awards.

== Plot ==
Sally (Sarah Goldberg) creates a Facebook profile for Barry (Bill Hader) under his stage name "Barry Block", which he uses to reconnect with an old military friend, Chris Lucado. Sally has an audition and they plan to meet at a party held that night by Natalie (D'Arcy Carden).

Barry meets with Fuches (Stephen Root), who informs Barry that the Chechens want him to carry out a dangerous raid on a Bolivian stash house. Meanwhile, the Los Angeles Police Department brings in a technician to unlock the lipstick camera after Moss (Paula Newsome) exceeds the amount of password attempts. Moss calls Gene (Henry Winkler), who is at an audition and claims to have information regarding Ryan which he offers to disclose over dinner at a restaurant. Sally's manager Mike Hallman (Robert Curtis Brown) makes unwelcome advances towards her while practicing for the audition, and plays it off as a joke.

At class, Gene criticizes Barry's delivery of a monologue from Glengarry Glen Ross and says he can use his military background to improve his acting. Inspired, Barry later confronts Fuches and refuses to do the raid. As Sally waits for her audition, she learns that Mike has dropped her as a client, causing her to break down. Barry, still daydreaming about a life with Sally that includes Jon Hamm joining them for a barbecue party, buys a laptop as a gift.

At the party, Sally lies about the audition to Barry and is uncomfortable with being gifted an expensive laptop. A lonely Barry texts Chris to come along with two of his Marine friends. Fuches appears, hands him the stash house intel, and tells Barry he can keep going to acting class if he continues as a hitman. Barry bonds with Chris at the party, while Chris's friends Taylor (Dale Pavinski) and Vaughn (Marcus Brown) begin roughhousing to Natalie's chagrin. Barry jealously confronts an actor named Zach Burrows (Ross Philips) who is talking with Sally, who berates him for being possessive and leaves with Zach.

Moss meets a flirtatious Gene and decides to stay for dinner despite him failing to provide useful information. When she returns to the station, the lipstick camera has been unlocked, but the hitman's image is too blurry to easily identify. Meanwhile, as Barry gets into his car to leave the party, Taylor finds the stash house intel and tells him he wants in on the raid.

== Production ==
=== Development ===
In February 2018, the episode's title was revealed as "Chapter Four: Commit... to YOU" and it was announced that co-producer Sarah Solemani had written the episode while Maggie Carey had directed it.

=== Writing ===
According to Henry Winkler, the episode helped develop Gene's character, with the episode representing him as "the sadness of wanting to be somebody and maybe not becoming that person you want to be. So you create it in this artificial space." Winkler also mentioned that the scene where his character auditioned for an extra role inspired "profound sadness" in series creators Bill Hader and Alec Berg.

== Reception ==
=== Viewers ===
The episode was watched by 0.511 million viewers, earning a 0.2 in the 18-49 rating demographics on the Nielson ratings scale. This means that 0.2 percent of all households with televisions watched the episode. This was a 15% decrease from the previous episode, which was watched by 0.595 million viewers with a 0.2 in the 18-49 demographics.

=== Critical reviews ===
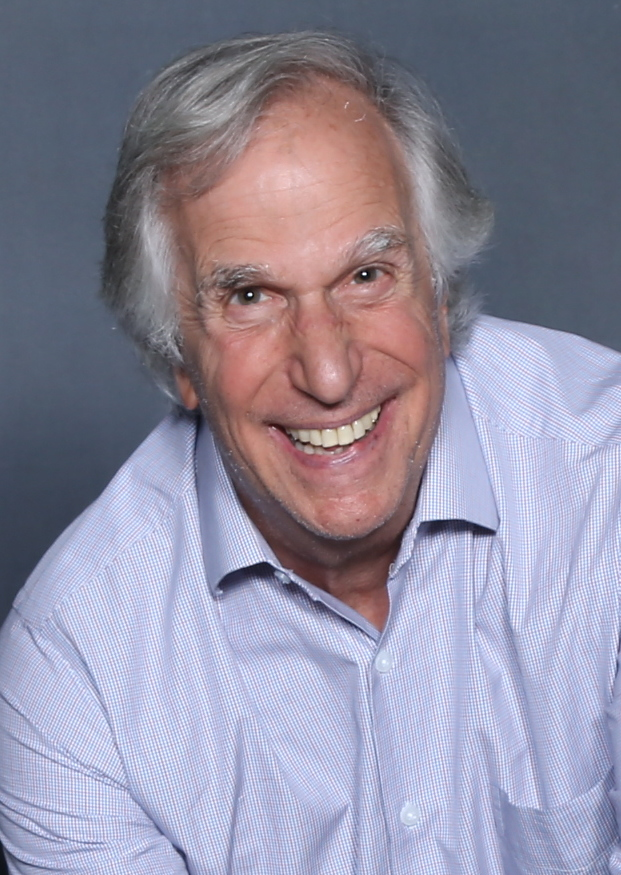
Henry Winkler's performance in the episode received critical acclaim. Winkler would win the Primetime Emmy Award for Outstanding Supporting Actor in a Comedy Series for this episode.

"Chapter Four: Commit... to YOU" received positive reviews. Vikram Murthi of The A.V. Club gave the episode a "B" and wrote, "For the past three episodes, Barry has tried to run from his past, but, predictably, his past keeps catching up to him. He tried to wiggle his way out of killing Ryan Madison only to end up in a position where he kills a car full of Chechens. He tried to leave the hitman business behind only to be forced to kill Paco, the Chechens' informant into the Bolivian gang, because Fuches' life was in danger. But after Barry killed Paco, it seems like all the loose ends had been tied up."

Nick Harley of Den of Geek wrote, "Most of the comedy this week is supplied by the always fantastic Henry Winkler as Gene Cousineau. We get a peek at Cousineau's life as a working actor and it's just as pathetic as suspected. It further colors his behavior at the acting class, where he's treated like a returning hero at the beginning of each class and uses his position of authority to take back some of the control and respect that he doesn't get elsewhere in his life." Charles Bramesco of Vulture gave the episode a 4 star rating out of 5 and wrote, "The living embodiment of this brain twister is Gene Cousineau, who claims the spotlight this week with a surprisingly intense, layered turn from Henry Winkler. Not unlike Barry, passing for a normal guy in his violent everyday life, Gene is adept at assuming a persona. This episode casts him as two men, one pathetic and ground down by a career of one-line gigs, the other commanding and seductive. Winkler convincingly inhabits both the beta and alpha positions, showing the audience the mushy innards behind the chest he puffs out in class or around women. Gene has less control over how he turns this on and off, however. His problem is not that he's a bad actor, but that he can't do it on command."

=== Awards and accolades ===
TVLine named Henry Winkler as an honorable mention as the "Performer of the Week" for the week of April 21, 2018, for his performance in the episode. The site wrote, "This week, Gene hilariously breezed through an audition for the coveted role of 'Man in Back of Line', with Winkler lending Gene an air of serene self-confidence, even in humiliating circumstances. Then the former Fonz got seductively silly as Gene took advantage of the murder of one of his acting students to put the moves on an attractive homicide detective. Actually, the appeal of Winkler's performance is that Gene is so completely comfortable with who he is, and where he is in life. And so is Winkler, it seems: He could be sitting at home counting his Happy Days residuals, but instead, he's giving us this wonderfully entertaining late-career turn."

Winkler submitted this episode for consideration for his Primetime Emmy Award for Outstanding Supporting Actor in a Comedy Series nomination at the 70th Primetime Emmy Awards. He would win the award, earning his first Emmy win.
