= Chapter Three: Make the Unsafe Choice =

- Barry episode
- Episode no.: Season 1 Episode 3
- Directed by: Bill Hader
- Written by: Duffy Boudreau
- Cinematography by: Paula Huidobro
- Editing by: Jeff Buchanan
- Original air date: April 8, 2018
- Running time: 34 minutes

Guest appearances
- Paula Newsome as Detective Janice Moss; Robert Curtis Brown as Mike Hallman; Kat Foster as Liv; Larry Hankin as Stovka; John Pirruccello as Detective John Loach; Darrell Britt-Gibson as Jermaine Jefrint; Andy Carey as Eric; Rightor Doyle as Nick Nicholby; Alejandro Furth as Antonio Manuel; Kirby Howell-Baptiste as Sasha Baxter; Mark Ivanir as Vacha

Episode chronology
← Previous "Chapter Two: Use It"	Next → "Chapter Four: Commit... to YOU"

"Chapter Three: Make the Unsafe Choice" is the third episode of the first season of the American crime tragicomedy television series Barry. The episode was written by Duffy Boudreau, and directed by series co-creator Bill Hader, who also serves as the main lead actor. It was first broadcast on HBO in the United States on April 8, 2018.

The series follows Barry Berkman, a hitman from Cleveland who travels to Los Angeles to kill someone but finds himself joining an acting class taught by Gene Cousineau, where he meets aspiring actress Sally Reed and begins to question his path in life as he deals with his criminal associates such as Monroe Fuches and NoHo Hank. In the episode, Barry is instructed to kill a target for Pazar but is forced to delay the action per Hank's orders. His class is also the subject of a police investigation, as authorities found a connection between Ryan and the class. Sally has an audition, but meeting a former friend causes her to break down.

According to Nielsen Media Research, the episode was seen by an estimated 0.595 million household viewers and gained a 0.2 ratings share among adults aged 18–49. The episode received positive reviews from critics, who praised the performances, dark humor and character development.

== Plot ==
Barry (Bill Hader), armed with a sniper rifle, is surveilling the house of his target: Paco Zambrana (Geo Corvera), a Bolivian drug cartel member turned informant for the Chechens. However, Hank (Anthony Carrigan) calls him to delay the hit as he wants the Bolivians to receive a bullet he sent in the mail right before Paco's death. Barry complies as Fuches (Stephen Root) is still held hostage.

While working as a party princess, Sally (Sarah Goldberg) is informed by her agent that there is an audition in a We Bought a Zoo television adaptation. Goran (Glenn Fleshler) excitedly informs Hank that the famed Chechen assassin Stovka (Larry Hankin) is arriving. Stovka turns out to be a weary man and is ordered by Goran to guard Fuches until Barry returns and then to kill them both.

Detective Moss (Paula Newsome) is informed by her partner Detective Loach (John Pirruccello) that Ryan Madison had an affair with Goran's wife, providing a murder motive but they still question who killed the Chechens at the crime scene. They deduce that because Ryan was unfamiliar with the city, he was likely with a member from his acting class. Meanwhile, Stovka, depressed by his life as an assassin, fatally shoots himself, shocking Fuches and Goran, who now urgently needs a hitman.

The detectives interrogate the acting class members about Ryan, after which Gene (Henry Winkler) flirts with a seemingly disinterested Moss. Barry takes Sally to her audition, where she finds out that a former friend, Liv (Kat Foster) with whom she had worked on a failed series, is the lead and had advocated for her audition. Sally is so devastated by this revelation that she breaks down during the audition. Barry comforts her while she leaves and they are secretly photographed by Vacha (Mark Ivanir).

Over dinner, Fuches suggests that Goran could lure Cristobal Sifuentes, the leader of the Bolivian cartel, to Los Angeles by seizing one of his stash houses and kill him. The bullet is delivered, but Barry misses his opportunity to shoot Paco when Sally calls him for comfort. Eventually, Barry promises to visit, sneaks into the house, and strangles Paco to death.

Barry arrives at Sally's house, where she wonders what her acting future will be shortly before they have sex. He remembers Paco's last words (in Spanish) and asks Sally what they meant. She says "you don't have to do this".

== Production ==
=== Development ===
In February 2018, the episode's title was revealed as "Chapter Three: Make the Unsafe Choice" and it was announced that Duffy Boudreau had written the episode while series creator and main actor Bill Hader had directed it. This was Boudreau's first writing credit, and Hader's third directing credit.

== Reception ==
=== Viewers ===
The episode was watched by 0.595 million viewers, earning a 0.2 in the 18-49 rating demographics on the Nielson ratings scale. This means that 0.2 percent of all households with televisions watched the episode. This was a 8% decrease from the previous episode, which was watched by 0.641 million viewers with a 0.2 in the 18-49 demographics.

=== Critical reviews ===
"Chapter Three: Make the Unsafe Choice" received positive reviews. Vikram Murthi of The A.V. Club gave the episode a "B+" and wrote, "Barry tends to focus on two kinds of people: Those who want to be the best, and those who are the best and are miserable because of it. 'Chapter Three: Make The Unsafe Choice', written by Duffy Boudreau, follows three characters who fit somewhere into those two categories. First, Sally Reed, an ambitious, aspiring actress who’s convinced that relentless determination will overcome any obstacles in her path to become a movie star. Second, Stovka, the best assassin in all of Chechnya turned inconsolable depressive after a long life plagued by death. Finally, there's Barry, another world-class assassin who knows it's not too late to pivot towards something more meaningful and less destructive."

Nick Harley of Den of Geek gave the episode a 4 star rating out of 5 and wrote, "This was another extremely well-crafted, tight episode. It was great to see the show stretching out, taking the focus off of Barry a bit more and exploring some of the other characters." Charles Bramesco of Vulture gave the episode a 3 star rating out of 5 and wrote, "The episode's B-plot introduces a foil for Barry in the ancient Chechen assassin Stovka, a warning of the harrowing future that awaits him. A lifetime of causing pain has left Stovka a shell of himself, seeing no cure for his own guilt but suicide. The scenes between Fuches and Stovka hit a rarefied high of gallows humor, but they're the also the darkest passages that the show has produced yet. Even on the long term, for Barry, the stakes are life and death. He cannot continue making a living killing. It'll be the end of him — the only question is who will be holding the gun."

=== Accolades ===
TVLine named Sarah Goldberg as an honorable mention as the "Performer of the Week" for the week of April 14, 2018, for her performance in the episode. The site wrote, "Sally was thrilled to get an audition for an upcoming pilot, but her face fell when she learned an obnoxious former co-star of hers was already cast as the lead, and only brought her in as a favor. The normally upbeat Sally was heartbroken, and Goldberg was devastatingly vulnerable as Sally faked her way through congratulating her frenemy before completely bombing the biggest audition of her life. It actually takes great acting to play a bad actor — and Goldberg was very bad this week indeed."
