= Crazytimesh*tshow =

"crazytimesh*tshow"
- Barry episode
- Episode no.: Season 3 Episode 5
- Directed by: Alec Berg
- Written by: Emily Heller
- Cinematography by: Darran Tiernan
- Editing by: Ali Greer
- Original air date: May 22, 2022
- Running time: 28 minutes

Guest appearances
- Elizabeth Perkins as Diane Villa; D'Arcy Carden as Natalie Greer; Michael Irby as Cristobal Sifuentes; Jessy Hodges as Lindsay Mandel; Laura San Giacomo as Annie; Darrell Britt-Gibson as Jermaine Jefrint; Rightor Doyle as Nick Nicholby; James Hiroyuki Liao as Albert Nguyen; Michael Ironside as Andrei; Joe Mantegna as himself; Annabeth Gish as Julie; Andrew Leeds as Leo Cousineau; Nick Gracer as Yandal; JB Blanc as Batir; Gary Kraus as Chief Krauss; Turhan Troy Caylak as Akhmal; Alexander Macnicoll as Kyle; Krizia Bajos as Elena; Michael Lanahan as Showrunner; Carlos Lacámara as Mr. Coleman; Joanna Sotomura as Casey; Jolene Van Vugt as Traci

Episode chronology
← Previous "all the sauces"	Next → "710N"

"crazytimesh*tshow" is the fifth episode of the third season of the American crime tragicomedy television series Barry. It is the 21st overall episode of the series and was written by supervising producer Emily Heller, and directed by series co-creator Alec Berg. It was first broadcast on HBO in the United States on May 22, 2022, and also was available on HBO Max on the same date.

The series follows Barry Berkman, a hitman from Cleveland who travels to Los Angeles to kill someone but finds himself joining an acting class taught by Gene Cousineau, where he meets aspiring actress Sally Reed and begins to question his path in life as he deals with his criminal associates such as Monroe Fuches and NoHo Hank. In the episode, Barry attempts to reconnect with Sally by being more sincere. Meanwhile, Cristobal's wife arrives at Los Angeles, while Gene attends a party hosted by Joe Mantegna.

According to Nielsen Media Research, the episode was seen by an estimated 0.257 million household viewers and gained a 0.04 ratings share among adults aged 18–49. The episode received extremely positive reviews from critics, with critics praising the performances, humor and character development, although some expressed criticism for the pace.

== Plot ==
Albert Nguyen (James Hiroyuki Liao), whom Barry (Bill Hader) helped after being shot in the Korengal Valley, is now an FBI special agent; he visits Mae Dunn (Sarah Burns) and Chief Krauss (Gary Kraus) to help on Janice Moss's murder case. He rejects the idea that "The Raven" killed her, and wonders about Barry's role. Meanwhile, Fuches (Stephen Root) tells the sister of Barry's fellow hitman Taylor (Note: Who died while working a job with Barry in "Chapter Six: Listen With Your Ears, React With Your Face".) that Barry owed him money.

Barry moves back in with his old roommates and asks for relationship advice from Hank (Anthony Carrigan) and Cristobal (Michael Irby), who both state that Barry needs to express himself more sincerely to Sally. Joplin is a critical success at its streaming service, BanShe, but the show is soon overshadowed by a new show, frustrating Sally (Sarah Goldberg). When she complains to BanShe executives, they announce they will cancel the show, despite just being released to glowing reviews because it allegedly performed poorly on the algorithm. Natalie (D'Arcy Carden) consoles Sally, stating that she created something special and that she learned a lot working with her.

Albert is dismayed by LAPD incompetence and orders the Chechens brought in for questioning. Fernando's daughter and Cristobal's wife, Elena (Krizia Bajos), arrives in Los Angeles to avenge her father's death. She leads a raid on the Chechen heroin shop shortly before the police arrive. Batir (JB Blanc) evades the raid as he live-streams the operations to his Chechen bosses, who are angry with the attack. Hank is alerted of the attack by Akhmal (Turhan Troy Caylak), who was kidnapped by the Bolivians. He hides in a closet as the Bolivians enter and take Cristobal. Elena is heartbroken to see a picture of Hank and Cristobal together.

Gene (Henry Winkler) attends a party hosted by Joe Mantegna. At dinner, Gene apologizes for his poor behavior in the past to Mantegna and a woman whom he previously dated, Annie (Laura San Giacomo). Annie then states that Gene ruined her directing career by blacklisting her after she left him and leaves without accepting the apology.

At Sally's place, Barry runs into Kyle (Alexander Macnicoll) outside the building, who leaves and argues with Julie (Annabeth Gish) about who will kill Barry. That night, Barry leaves his keys and a note when Sally enters, crying about the show's cancellation. Barry consoles her and asks for the BanShe executive's address, claiming he could use some psychological torture on her. An even more scared Sally demands that he leave. After Barry steps out, Julie accidentally shoots Kyle in the stomach, and they drive off as Barry, wondering where the sound of gunfire came from, walks away.

== Production ==
=== Development ===
In April 2022, the episode's title was revealed as "crazytimesh*tshow" and it was announced that supervising producer Emily Heller had written the episode while series co-creator Alec Berg had directed it. This was Heller's third writing credit, and Berg's seventh directing credit.

=== Writing ===
Part of Sally's storyline was inspired by a friend of Bill Hader, who worked on a Netflix series. The friend claimed to have a show on the homepage in the early morning, but once Hader searched for it overnight, he found it missing. He further added, "it was like that joke that's in there where she had to type out pretty much the whole thing before it showed up. That is from life." The idea was also suggested by Amy Gravitt, HBO’s EVP of Original Programming, who suggested that Sally could get everything right but her series still gets cancelled. Originally, after Joplin's cancellation, Natalie would say "I'm so sorry" to the writers room while she starts taking stuff from the office. While Hader and the crew laughed with the scene, he felt that the scene "undermined the emotion of it completely" and replaced it with the bathroom scene.

Barry's role in the episode was much smaller in the original episode. The character would appear in very few scenes before the final scene with Sally. Hader felt that Barry had "no real story" on the episode and decided to add more scenes with his roommates, the grocery bags and asking advice from Hank and Cristobal. Barry's collage was inspired by the 1981 film Thief, where Frank (portrayed by James Caan) took out a collage he made, a scene that Hader found hilarious, "We thought that was really funny that this tough guy had made a collage like our sisters would make." As a nod to Thief, the picture of Willie Nelson on Barry's collage is the same as the picture on Thief.

The raid at the heroin shop was inspired by Mad Max 2, where Max Rockatansky witnesses the raid at the compound. For the series, Batir witnesses the raid while live-streaming with his Chechen bosses. The title of the episode derives from one of the bosses commenting on the livestream “Batir, this is [a] crazy time shitshow” as the Chechens, Bolivians, and police fight over the heroin shop. Elena's arrival at Hank's and Cristobal's house was reshot, as the writers felt her surprise arrival would only cause confusion.

== Reception ==
=== Viewers ===
The episode was watched by 0.257 million viewers, earning a 0.04 in the 18-49 rating demographics on the Nielson ratings scale. This means that 0.04 percent of all households with televisions watched the episode. This was a slight decrease from the previous episode, which was watched by 0.270 million viewers with a 0.05 in the 18-49 demographics.

=== Critical reviews ===
"crazytimesh*tshow" received largely positive reviews from critics. David Cote of The A.V. Club gave the episode an "A−" and wrote, "Either way, it felt like a small misstep in a show that is trying something exceedingly difficult: an elaborate comic conceit wrapped in a tragic vision. Barry's moral compass turns on two interrelated dichotomies: forgiveness vs. vengeance, and happiness vs. success. No character can have it all. The cycles of chasing either showbiz success or retribution feed each other, ensuring sorrow for anyone who stays in the game. Barry will only know peace if he gives himself up to the police or dies. That could make Albert the angel of death."

Ben Rosenstock of Vulture gave the episode a 3 star rating out of 5 and wrote, "'Crazytimesh*tshow' is a solid but slightly disjointed episode of Barry with much left unresolved. It's hard to know exactly what to make of Sally's story, for example. [...] As we barrel toward season three's endgame, there are a lot of balls in the air — and 'Crazytimesh*tshow' only adds to the juggling act. It makes for a slightly unwieldy but thrilling episode. I've never wanted to watch the next one more." Nick Harley of Den of Geek gave the episode a perfect 5 star rating out of 5 and wrote, "As I said up top, this episode is jam-packed and it's pretty successful with everything it presents, but it still leaves you wishing there was more time spent exploring Gene's mental state and where his feelings with Barry lie, or Barry trying to work through what exactly went wrong with Sally. A little more emphasis on character moments could take this already excellent show to the next level, but this is the tiniest of nit-picks."
