= You're charming =

"you're charming"
- Barry episode
- Episode no.: Season 4 Episode 3
- Directed by: Bill Hader
- Written by: Emma Barrie
- Cinematography by: Carl Herse
- Editing by: Ali Greer
- Original air date: April 23, 2023
- Running time: 32 minutes

Guest appearances
- Michael Irby as Cristobal Sifuentes; Fred Melamed as Tom Posorro; Dan Bakkedahl as Agent James Curtis; Charles Parnell as DA Buckner; Fred Armisen as Nestor; Guillermo del Toro as Toro; David Warshofsky as FBI Agent Harris; Cornell Womack as FBI Agent; Patrick Fischler as Lon O'Neil; Richard Riehle as Warden Reynolds; François Chau as Bong; JB Blanc as Batir; Ellyn Jameson as Kristen; Ericka Kreutz as Mrs. O'Neil; Anthony Molinari as Shane Taylor; Tobie Windham as "Groove Tube" Damian; Andre Hyland as "Live Wire" Jason

Episode chronology
← Previous "bestest place on the earth"	Next → "it takes a psycho"

"you're charming" is the third episode of the fourth season of the American crime tragicomedy television series Barry. It is the 27th overall episode of the series and was written by Emma Barrie and directed by series creator Bill Hader, who also serves as lead actor. It was first broadcast on HBO in the United States on April 23, 2023, and also was available on HBO Max on the same date.

The series follows Barry Berkman, a hitman from Cleveland who travels to Los Angeles to kill someone but finds himself joining an acting class taught by Gene Cousineau, where he meets aspiring actress Sally Reed and begins to question his path in life as he deals with his criminal associates such as Monroe Fuches and NoHo Hank. The previous seasons saw Barry try to decide between both lives, which culminated in his arrest. In the episode, Barry's actions unleash consequences, as Hank hires hitmen to kill him in prison. Meanwhile, Gene finds that his exaggerated description of his relationship with Barry may have severe consequences to Barry's incoming trial.

According to Nielsen Media Research, the episode was seen by an estimated 0.208 million household viewers and gained a 0.03 ratings share among adults aged 18–49. The episode received critical acclaim from critics, who praised the episode's humor, character development, performances and Hader's directing. For the episode, Bill Hader received a nomination for Outstanding Lead Actor in a Comedy Series at the 75th Primetime Emmy Awards.

== Plot ==
As their crew is ecstatic over the arrival of the imported sand, Hank (Anthony Carrigan) and Cristobal (Michael Irby) meet with "Toro" (Guillermo del Toro), who has agreed to send two hitmen to kill Barry (Bill Hader).

District Attorney Buckner (Charles Parnell) informs Gene (Henry Winkler) and Tom Posorro (Fred Melamed) that Barry is making a deal with the FBI and advises them not to talk. Gene tells Tom about the one-man performance he gave to Lon O'Neil (Patrick Fischler), (Note: As depicted in "bestest place on the earth".) and Tom insists that they must stop the article from being published. In prison, Barry has informed the FBI agents about Hank and Cristobal's relationship. They intend to honor their deal, informing him that his companion, Sally (Sarah Goldberg), will have to be questioned as she must leave her life behind. Lon O'Neil visits prison for comment from Barry, who shouts that Gene should keep silent. Lon then visits Jim (Robert Wisdom), telling him he spoke with Gene.

Sally has started teaching her own acting class and the attendees are aware of her recent scandals. Fuches (Stephen Root) is discreetly told by Hank of the upcoming hit. Batir (JB Blanc) surprises Hank in the compound and offers him an ultimatum: kill the crew or be killed by Chechen reinforcements. Meanwhile, Gene and Tom break into Lon's house, and meet Lon's wife, who directs them to Jim. Jim rebukes Gene for talking and says that he spoke to Lon in his garage. Lon arrives home, with no evidence of anything, now speaking only in German due to Jim's psychological torture.

While hearing monologues, Sally is taken aback by a performer, Kristen (Ellyn Jameson), who arrived unprepared. She humiliates her in front of the class as Gene once did to her (Note: As depicted in "Chapter One: Make Your Mark".) and Kristen confidently recites the "I am big! It's the pictures that got small" line from Sunset Boulevard. Sally excuses her method as one of Gene's, but the entire class leaves except for Kristen, who has booked a gig and wants Sally's help. Back in prison, Barry calls Hank and claims that Gene has information on the Chechens. Hank confronts Barry on his lies, stating he knows that he talked to the FBI.

Inspired by Rain Man, Fuches decides to warn the officers about the hit on Barry, but isn't taken seriously. Barry has been escorted to meet WITSEC Agent James Curtis (Dan Bakkedahl) and identifies a nervous official to the agents as a hitman. The hitman, Nestor (Fred Armisen), blows off his own finger with his faulty gadget gun pen. His brother Chuy, hiding in the ceiling, kills everyone but Barry, who retrieves a gun, kills Chuy, and sneaks away, while the prison is placed on lockdown. Warden Reynolds (Richard Riehle) and two guards arrive at the massacre with Barry nowhere to be found.

== Production ==
=== Development ===
In April 2023, the episode's title was revealed as "you're charming" and it was announced that Emma Barrie had written the episode while series creator and lead actor Bill Hader had directed it. This was Barrie's second writing credit, and Hader's thirteenth directing credit.

=== Casting ===
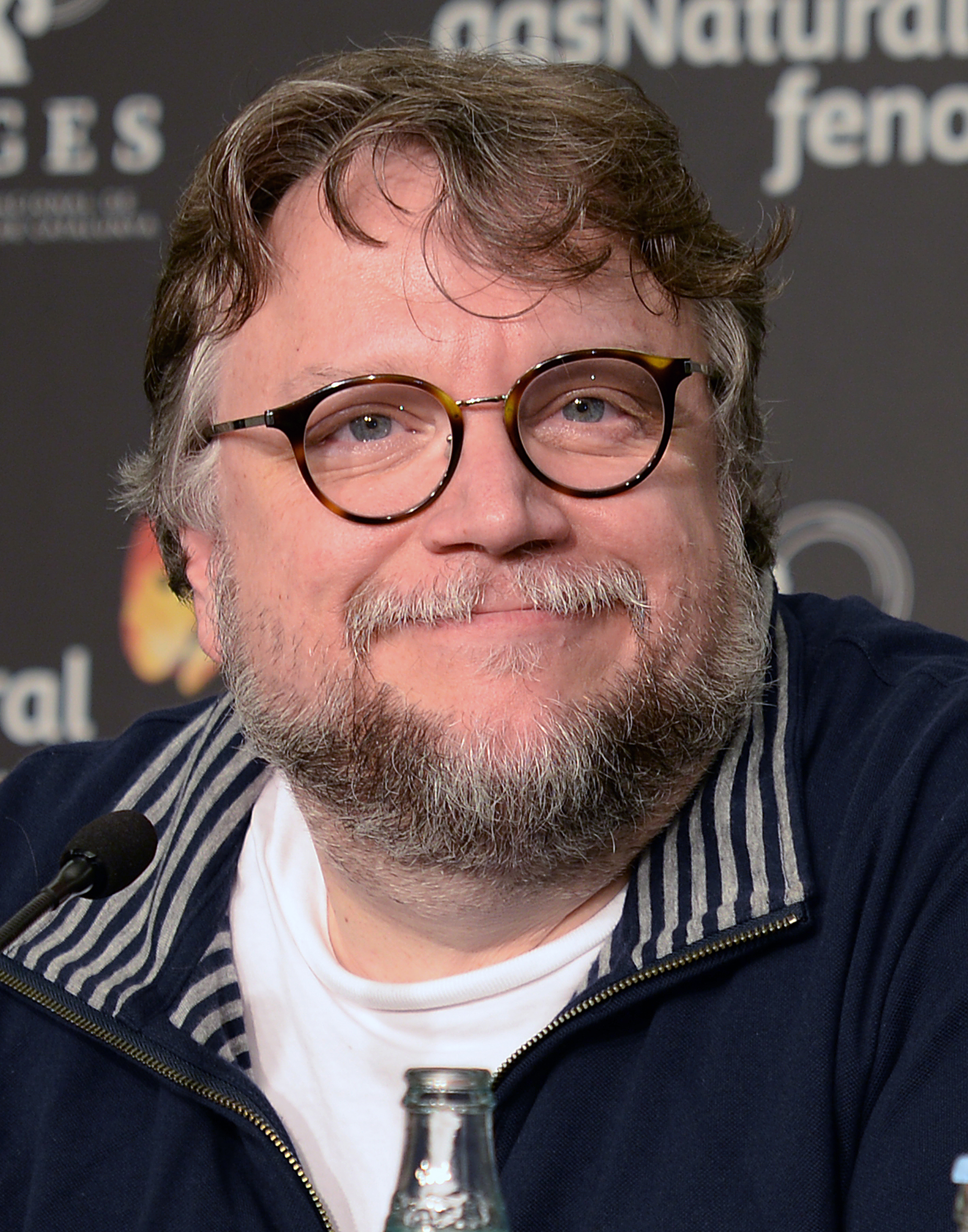
Guillermo del Toro guest stars in the episode.

The episode featured a guest appearance by Guillermo del Toro, who appears as a criminal known as "El Toro" to help Hank and Cristobal in killing Barry. Del Toro had expressed admiration for the series and is friends with Hader, asking for a part in the series. Hader wrote the role specifically for him, and del Toro accepted, bringing his own cane to use in character.

== Reception ==
=== Ratings ===
The episode was watched by 0.208 million viewers, earning a 0.03 in the 18-49 rating demographics on the Nielson ratings scale. This means that 0.03 percent of all households with televisions watched the episode. This was a slight decrease from the previous episode, which was watched by 0.216 million viewers with a 0.04 in the 18-49 demographics.

=== Critical reception ===
"you're charming" received critical acclaim reviews from critics. On the review aggregator Rotten Tomatoes, it holds an approval rating of 100% based on 6 reviews, with an average rating of 8.7/10. Steve Greene of IndieWire gave the episode an "A" and wrote, "So, in its own way, this week's 'You're Charming' finds Barry tapping into some of its old spirit again. From the opening sequence providing a 'Hey, that guy looks kinda like Guillermo Del Toro... Wait, that is Guillermo Del Toro!' moment, all the way through the ever-reliable Richard Riehle nailing the 'Oh shit. Where the hell is Berkman!' button, the weirdness here has gone back to being an inherent part of the show rather than something that merely happens to the people at its center." Josh Spiegel of /Film wrote, "'you're charming' is another suitably tense episode, and one that once again makes clear that while few of the characters on this show are truly good people, Barry Berkman has quickly become the worst of them."

Alan Sepinwall of Rolling Stone wrote, "'You're Charming' was a potent reminder of how consistently funny Barry can be when it wants, even as the episode's two centerpiece scenes involved emotional trauma and then shocking violence." Ben Rosenstock of Vulture gave the episode a 4 star rating out of 5 and wrote, "'You're Charming' is structured around the hit, with most of the half-hour deriving its tension from the dramatic irony of us knowing what Barry doesn't. We see him go through with the deal, spilling the beans about Hank and Cristobal's 'crime utopia' and fully assuming everything will work out for him, including Sally's cooperation. Fuches even tries to save Barry's life from his separate cell block, though his warnings about something going down in special housing get ignored."

Matt Schimkowitz of The A.V. Club gave the episode a "B+" and wrote, "There were times in this episode the show felt a little expository, as if we were seeing more setup than payoff. Still, I can't stop thinking about it as a whole. There's so much magic in this episode: the camera work in the opening shot, the home invasion, Sally's close-up, the cameos that never feel overplayed, Han Zimmer's Rain Man theme needle-drop... There's no scene without something original or strange or worth seeing. These killers tap into their ugliest versions as those around them chew Skittles, serve them jalapeño poppers, and enjoy their podcasts. That's crime utopia, and it remains sublime television."

=== Accolades ===
Bill Hader submitted the episode to support his nomination for Outstanding Lead Actor in a Comedy Series at the 75th Primetime Emmy Awards.
