= All the sauces =

"all the sauces"
- Barry episode
- Episode no.: Season 3 Episode 4
- Directed by: Alec Berg
- Written by: Jason Kim
- Cinematography by: Darran Tiernan
- Editing by: Ali Greer
- Original air date: May 15, 2022
- Running time: 31 minutes

Guest appearances
- Elizabeth Perkins as Diane Villa; D'Arcy Carden as Natalie Greer; Michael Irby as Cristobal Sifuentes; Miguel Sandoval as Fernando; Jessy Hodges as Lindsay Mandel; Fred Melamed as Tom Posorro; Michael Bofshever as George Krempf; Joe Mantegna as himself; Annabeth Gish as Julie; Andrew Leeds as Leo Cousineau; Nick Gracer as Yandal; Turhan Troy Caylak as Akhmal; Elsie Fisher as Katie; Alexander Macnicoll as Kyle; Joanna Sotomura as Casey; Ali Greer (voice) as app operator

Episode chronology
← Previous "ben mendelsohn"	Next → "crazytimesh*tshow"

"all the sauces" is the fourth episode of the third season of the American crime tragicomedy television series Barry. It is the 20th overall episode of the series and was written by supervising producer Jason Kim, and directed by series co-creator Alec Berg. It was first broadcast on HBO in the United States on May 15, 2022, and also was available on HBO Max on the same date.

The series follows Barry Berkman, a hitman from Cleveland who travels to Los Angeles to kill someone but finds himself joining an acting class taught by Gene Cousineau, where he meets aspiring actress Sally Reed and begins to question his path in life as he deals with his criminal associates such as Monroe Fuches and NoHo Hank. In the episode, Barry accepts Hank's help in killing Fernando. Meanwhile, Gene fears for his life after the events at the set, while Sally attends the premiere of her new series. Fuches also starts conspiring against Barry by visiting some people familiar with his victims.

According to Nielsen Media Research, the episode was seen by an estimated 0.270 million household viewers and gained a 0.05 ratings share among adults aged 18–49. The episode received critical acclaim, with critics praising the performances (particularly Bill Hader and Sarah Goldberg), writing and character development.

== Plot ==
Barry (Bill Hader) shoots a man dead in a hotel after he gets off the phone with his wife Julie (Annabeth Gish), with the murder revealed to be the first scene of the series. In the present day, Fuches (Stephen Root), pretending to be a private investigator, visits Julie and her son, Kyle (Alexander Macnicoll), offering them information on his murder. Fuches also similarly visits Ryan Madison's father, George Krempf (Michael Bofshever).

Gene (Henry Winkler) is convinced that Barry will kill his family and unsuccessfully tries to convince Leo (Andrew Leeds) to leave Los Angeles. Gene's agent Tom Posorro (Fred Melamed) tells him that the slap made the showrunners offer him an extended role. They run into Joe Mantegna, who shows them a Variety article where the show's producers highlighted Gene in a positive way. Tom advises Gene not to squander this chance to be forgiven by Hollywood, but Gene insists he must leave. Barry meets with Hank (Anthony Carrigan) to discuss the bombing of Fernando (Miguel Sandoval) and his men, and is given a time that Cristobal (Michael Irby) will not be at the house.

Barry promises to make Sally's (Sarah Goldberg) Joplin premiere as he arrives at the Bolivian house. He plants the bomb in the crawl space, but the detonator app fails and Barry spends hours contacting the app's IT team and fails to notice Cristobal's return. Inside, Fernando reveals that he knows about Cristobal's betrayals of his wife and the Bolivians. He then gives Cristobal an ultimatum: kill Hank or be killed. Cristobal flees just as the bomb finally detonates. As Barry drives away, he finds an injured Cristobal.

A stressed Sally (Sarah Goldberg) arrives at the premiere and learns that the show received critical acclaim, in contrast to the rival show's poor reviews. She then gives an emotional speech, giving credit to Katie (Elsie Fisher), Gene, Barry, and Lindsay (Jessy Hodges). Later during the event, Katie tells Sally that Barry was violent towards her at the set and worries that he might hurt her, leaving Sally speechless.

Barry takes an injured Cristobal to Hank, who thanks and pays him. Barry then visits Gene at his house and apologizes for taking him hostage, offering him the money and stating he will never see him again. Barry leaves and Gene tells Leo that they will stay. Barry catches up with Sally at her premiere, apologizing for missing it. Sally breaks up with him, citing the set incident. Julie and Kyle conclude that they must take action and buy a Glock from a gun store.

== Production ==
=== Development ===
In April 2022, the episode's title was revealed as "all the sauces" and it was announced that supervising producer Jason Kim had written the episode while series co-creator Alec Berg had directed it. This was Kim's third writing credit, and Berg's sixth directing credit.

=== Writing ===
While Hank's storyline was altered through reshoots, planting the bomb at the house was still part of the original plan. A slight difference was Cristobal visiting the house during the day and his argument with Fernando extended through the night. Hader thought the scene would not make sense and had Cristobal visiting at night so the conversation would be shorter. Hader also explained that Barry accepting Hank's offer was a way to make up to Gene; instead of feeling pressured to kill, Barry was thinking "How do I make this up to him?" and accepted the job to give him the money.

The episode featured the break-up of Barry's and Sally's relationship. Elsie Fisher suggested to Hader that her character should act more nervous about Barry's actions and Hader conceded. The decision to break up the characters was not planned in advance, and was actually brought up during the writing process. The episode's writer Jason Kim suggested the idea after Barry misses the premiere, with Hader explaining "We just loved that idea that it's all being stowed away, their relationship and all this, to not hit it too hard."

The episode connected to the first episode through a flashback, expanding on Barry committing a murder in the very first scene of the series. Hader commented, "that guy is just a body in a TV show and you've seen that 100 times, but what if you found out that he had a loving wife and son?" Stephen Root explained that Fuches' intentions are not actually planned, saying "I don't think he's planned shit. He thinks on his feet — and he's not dumb. I mean, he's managed to manipulate the police through seasons one and two. He's managed to stay out of jail. He's not a dumb person. What he is is completely stubborn in terms of what he wants. He wants what he wants, so he's going to go get what he wants, come hell or high water. But I don’t think he plans specifically for stuff in the long-range, he'll think of something and go, 'Yeah, that's good. Let's do that.'"

=== Casting ===
Fred Melamed guest stars in the episode as Tom Posorro, Gene Cousineau's agent. Melamed got the role after being recommended by the casting director Sherry Thomas and previously working with Alec Berg in other projects. Joe Mantegna also guest stars as himself, also recommended by Thomas and accepting to appear. Annabeth Gish, who appears in the episode, is married to Wade Allen, who coordinates stunts for the series.

== Reception ==
=== Viewers ===
The episode was watched by 0.270 million viewers, earning a 0.05 in the 18–49 rating demographics on the Nielson ratings scale. This means that 0.05 percent of all households with televisions watched the episode. This was a slight decrease from the previous episode, which was watched by 0.299 million viewers with a 0.07 in the 18–49 demographics.

=== Critical reviews ===
"all the sauces" received critical acclaim. David Cote of The A.V. Club gave the episode an "A−" and wrote, "Halfway through Barry's third season, it seems like Bill Hader and Alec Berg are wrapping up plot lines spun out in the first half and bringing in new ones. Of course, there's no reason to doubt both halves will come crashing together. The long arc of the series has been the impossibility of murder and showbiz to coexist peacefully in one person, i.e., the conflict between personal and professional integrity. By the end of 'all the sauces', Sally breaks up with Barry, Fernando and the Bolivians get blown up in their Airbnb, NoHo Hank and Cristobal reunite, and Gene Cousineau is released by Barry, given a duffel of cash, and his explosive cameo on The Laws Of Humanity might have restarted his career."

Ben Rosenstock of Vulture gave the episode a 4 star rating out of 5 and wrote, "'All the Sauces' may not be the best episode of Barry's third season; much of it is spent setting up future stories, as when Gene gets offered additional scenes on Laws of Humanity and even receives a dinner invite from Joe Mantegna, who wants to bury the hatchet after reading about what Gene did for a veteran. But I'm fascinated by the continual deepening and complication of our protagonist, and I understand better now how the series can extend for another season or two after this one." Nick Harley of Den of Geek gave the episode a perfect 5 star rating out of 5 and wrote, "Full of funny, specific pieces of humor and shake-ups to this season's status quo, 'all the sauces' is another stellar episode of Barry. With excellent pacing and dynamic camera work as well, I'm hard pressed to find something negative to say about the show at this point. I do believe that the Barry and Sally relationship could have used more reinforcement to make this breakup plotline feel more significant, but I'm willing to see where things head before rushing to judgement. Barry had been excellent in the past, but it feels like it's operating at peak performance right now."

=== Accolades ===
TVLine named Sarah Goldberg as an honorable mention as the "Performer of the Week" for the week of May 21, 2022, for her performance in the episode. The site wrote, "If they gave out Emmys for Hollywood premiere speeches, we'd hand one right away to Barry's Sally, with Sarah Goldberg delivering a loopy, giddy roller coaster of a monologue this week. Sally is finally achieving the fame she's always craved and at her show's premiere, Sally deviated from her prepared speech to freak out about its glowing Rotten Tomatoes score. After an uncomfortably long pause filled with gasped sobs, Goldberg's eyes lit up as Sally breathlessly thanked everyone in her life, with the magnitude of her success finally dawning on her. The orchestra eventually had to play her off, but we would've kept listening, if only to savor more of Goldberg's wildly chaotic and hilarious work."

The episode received a nomination for Outstanding Sound Mixing for a Comedy or Drama Series (Half-Hour) and Animation at the 74th Primetime Emmy Awards.
