= Bestest place on the earth =

"bestest place on the earth"
- Barry episode
- Episode no.: Season 4 Episode 2
- Directed by: Bill Hader
- Written by: Nicky Hirsch
- Cinematography by: Carl Herse
- Editing by: Franky Guttman
- Original air date: April 16, 2023
- Running time: 30 minutes

Guest appearances
- Michael Irby as Cristobal Sifuentes; Jessy Hodges as Lindsay Mandel; David Warshofsky as FBI Agent Harris; Cornell Womack as FBI Agent; Patrick Fischler as Lon O'Neil; Matt Servitto as Gale Winograde; François Chau as Bong; Tobie Windham as "Groove Tube" Damian; Andre Hyland as "Live Wire" Jason; John Gloria as John Berkman; Reese Levine as Young Barry Berkman

Episode chronology
← Previous "yikes"	Next → "you're charming"

"bestest place on the earth" is the second episode of the fourth season of the American crime tragicomedy television series Barry. It is the 26th overall episode of the series and was written by Nicky Hirsch and directed by series creator Bill Hader, who also serves as lead actor. It was first broadcast on HBO in the United States on April 16, 2023, and also was available on HBO Max on the same date. The episode aired back-to-back with the previous episode, "yikes".

The series follows Barry Berkman, a hitman from Cleveland who travels to Los Angeles to kill someone but finds himself joining an acting class taught by Gene Cousineau, where he meets aspiring actress Sally Reed and begins to question his path in life as he deals with his criminal associates such as Monroe Fuches and NoHo Hank. The previous seasons saw Barry try to decide between both lives, which culminated in his arrest. In the episode, Fuches tries to get protection for himself and Barry, while a visit from Sally causes Barry to change his priorities. Hank and Cristobal put their new business plan into action, and Gene finds a new opportunity to create a positive legacy for himself.

According to Nielsen Media Research, the episode was seen by an estimated 0.216 million household viewers and gained a 0.04 ratings share among adults aged 18–49. The episode received extremely positive reviews from critics, who praised Hader's directing, humor, performances, emotional weight and ending. For the episode, Henry Winkler received a nomination for Outstanding Supporting Actor in a Comedy Series at the 75th Primetime Emmy Awards.

== Plot ==
In a flashback, a young Barry (Reese Levine) runs through a field playing with military toys and is introduced by his military veteran father, John (John Gloria), to one of his friends, Fuches (Stephen Root). Back in the present day, Fuches informs his officers that he will abandon the wiretapping operation, not wanting to incriminate Barry (Bill Hader). Using his "Raven" status, Fuches struggles to convince other inmates into forming a gang with him and Barry for protection.

Cristobal (Michael Irby) meets with a former Thai associate, Bong (François Chau), to recruit him and his gang for their sand business. He reunites Bong's gang with their rival gang, the Guatemalan mafia, at a Dave & Buster's restaurant to discuss cooperation. Hank (Anthony Carrigan), meanwhile, has kept in touch with a person known as "Toro", who can help him break Barry out of prison, but will need henchmen. Cristobal convinces the gangs about their sand empire, but is taken aback when Hank explains he will need Barry for their plan. Meanwhile, Lon O'Neil (Patrick Fischler) meets with Gene (Henry Winkler) at the theater of his former acting class and the "interview" turns out to be a dramatized reenactment of his history with Barry.

Barry is surprised when Sally (Sarah Goldberg) visits him in prison. She discreetly asks him about the attacker she killed, (Note: As depicted in "starting now".) with Barry stating the situation is under control. She breaks down in tears, and says she feels safer around him when asked about why she came back, but does not answer Barry's further questions. Sally meets with Lindsay (Jessy Hodges), who explains she cannot be her agent anymore since her reputation is ruined after her outburst with Natalie and her relationship with Barry.

After more daydreaming, including a fantasy about a reception following his and Sally's marriage, Barry meets with FBI agents. He offers to give up the Chechens, Bolivians, and other powerful criminal organizations, in exchange for protection for him and someone else. Back at the theater, Gene finishes his performance, which included many self-serving lies, and then asks for anonymity. However, the event was witnessed by Sally, who confronts Gene for not warning her about Barry's hitman status. Gene says that they are both victims and advises her that if she cannot get acting jobs, she can always teach.

At their house, Cristobal questions why Hank brought up Barry during their operation. As Hank defends his decision, he is called by Fuches, who tells him that Barry has made a deal with authorities. Fuches had discovered that Barry was moved out of his cell after missing a meeting with defense counsel. A disappointed Hank returns to Cristobal, telling him they must now kill Barry.

== Production ==
=== Development ===
In April 2023, the episode's title was revealed as "bestest place on the earth" and it was announced that Nicky Hirsch had written the episode while series creator and lead actor Bill Hader had directed it. This was Hirsch's first writing credit, and Hader's twelfth directing credit.

=== Writing ===
The flashbacks were used to establish Fuches meeting young Barry and set their status. Bill Hader explained, "some people, in doing these interviews, felt that Fuches has been grooming him since he was a kid. But I don't think that's what's happening. I think Barry was his best friend's kid, and he just thought he was a cool, sweet guy, and they genuinely had a connection. So, I think there is more of a manipulative father-son thing going on there, but it's weirdly born out of real love."

The conversation during Sally's visit was suggested by Sarah Goldberg. As Hader wondered why would she visit him, she suggested she could say the line "I feel safe with you", with Hader explaining, "That kind of applies to a lot of the characters. We just want to go to a place where we feel safe and held when we're out of our element or things aren't going the way we want."

Regarding Gene's advice to Sally, Henry Winkler explained, "So there's a sense of humor to the line, but Gene was also telling her that she would be good at teaching. And when I saw [her teaching scene], I loved that she mimicked Gene."

=== Filming ===
For the scene where a flashback to Barry's childhood transitions into a daydream, Hader was inspired by some Italian films that accomplished this technique. On what it would cover, he said, "There's something that just felt right about this idea of a future to get a life together. That he’ll be happy to grow old with somebody, and the idea that a wedding takes him there." The scene was shot with a two month gap, and needed the presence of Hader's stand-in for the shot.

=== Music ===
For Gene's performance, the series used the song "Desperado" by Eagles while he waited for Lon. Hader was debating on which song he could use, and settled on "Desperado" at the suggestion of Paul Rudd.

== Reception ==
=== Ratings ===
The episode was watched by 0.216 million viewers, earning a 0.04 in the 18-49 rating demographics on the Nielson ratings scale. This means that 0.04 percent of all households with televisions watched the episode. This was a slight increase from the previous episode, which was watched by 0.274 million viewers with a 0.05 in the 18-49 demographics.

=== Critical reception ===
"bestest place on the earth" received extremely positive reviews from critics. On the review aggregator Rotten Tomatoes, it holds an approval rating of 100% based on 6 reviews, with an average rating of 8.3/10. Matt Schimkowitz of The A.V. Club gave the episode an "A–" and wrote, "This idea that the 'bad guys fight everyone but themselves' is what Barry was trying to do. Essentially what he's saying is bad guys don't look inwards. They don't do the work, and when they do, they end up like Tony Soprano, circling and recognizing the issue but still keeping the plot wheel spinning. No one can change too much or the show would be over, so they move on to the next target. When Barry starts battling himself, which manifests in getting guards to beat the crap out of him, things begin to unravel."

Alan Sepinwall of Rolling Stone deemed the episode as "filled with nightmares, flashbacks, and visions, because everyone is scarred by past events. Barry pictures Sally rehearsing lines in the prison yard, and later envisions the two of them as a happy older couple. Hank finds himself a prisoner of Cristobal's family again. Flying home to Joplin, Sally imagines that the man she killed is sitting in the row in front of her. Whatever criminal sentence Barry or Fuches may receive, we are seeing that some form of karmic comeuppance is coming for them all."

Ben Rosenstock of Vulture gave the episode a 4 star rating out of 5 and wrote, "Maybe the biggest question, as this final season progresses, will be this: Will anyone in Barry successfully leave behind the worst version of themselves?" Josh Spiegel of /Film wrote, "With these two excellent and unnerving episodes now in the books, I think it's safe to say that Barry remains as disturbing, as darkly funny, and as uncompromising as ever."

=== Accolades ===
TVLine named Henry Winkler as an honorable mention as the "Performer of the Week" for the week of April 22, 2023, for his performance in the episode. The site wrote, "Things can get pretty grim on Barry, so thank goodness Henry Winkler is there to lighten the mood. The veteran actor stepped into the spotlight (quite literally) this week, as Gene shared his story with a Vanity Fair writer the only way he knew how: by taking the stage and putting on an elaborate one-man show for an audience of one. Winkler was hilariously earnest as Gene acted out the saga of his relationship with his killer student Barry, putting on a ridiculous lunkhead voice to play Barry that didn't sound anything like him. We love Barry's willingness to get dark, but we also love its lighter moments, and Winkler delivered a welcome jolt of laughs, reminding us that some actors will do just about anything to hear a little applause."

Winkler submitted the episode to support his nomination for Outstanding Supporting Actor in a Comedy Series at the 75th Primetime Emmy Awards.
