= Yikes (Barry) =

"yikes"
- Barry episode
- Episode no.: Season 4 Episode 1
- Directed by: Bill Hader
- Written by: Bill Hader
- Cinematography by: Carl Herse
- Editing by: Ali Greer
- Original air date: April 16, 2023
- Running time: 26 minutes

Guest appearances
- Michael Irby as Cristobal Sifuentes; Sarah Burns as Detective Mae Dunn; Andrew Leeds as Leo Cousineau; Jessy Hodges as Lindsay Mandel; Charles Parnell as DA Buckner; David Warshofsky as FBI Agent Harris; Cornell Womack as FBI Agent; Patrick Fischler as Lon O'Neil; Elsie Fisher as Katie; Gary Kraus as Chief Krauss; Anthony Molinari as Shane Taylor; Romy Rosemont as Claudia Reed; Michael Dempsey as Joe Reed; Erica Kreutz as; Andy Carey as Eric; Rightor Doyle as Nick Nicholby; Alejandro Furth as Antonio Manuel; Kirby Howell-Baptiste as Sasha Baxter; Michael Villar as Officer Birdwell; John Gloria as John Berkman (voice); Reese Levine as Young Barry Berkman

Episode chronology
← Previous "starting now"	Next → "bestest place on the earth"

"yikes" is the first episode of the fourth season of the American crime tragicomedy television series Barry. It is the 25th overall episode of the series and was written and directed by series creator Bill Hader, who also serves as lead actor. It was first broadcast on HBO in the United States on April 16, 2023, and also was available on HBO Max on the same date. The episode aired back-to-back with the follow-up episode, "bestest place on the earth".

The series follows Barry Berkman, a hitman from Cleveland who travels to Los Angeles to kill someone but finds himself joining an acting class taught by Gene Cousineau, where he meets aspiring actress Sally Reed and begins to question his path in life as he deals with his criminal associates such as Monroe Fuches and NoHo Hank. The previous seasons saw Barry try to decide between both lives, which culminated in his arrest. In the episode, Barry is now in prison after his arrest, only to run into Fuches, who has also been imprisoned. Meanwhile, Hank and Cristobal plan a new business strategy, while Sally moves back to Joplin.

According to Nielsen Media Research, the episode was seen by an estimated 0.274 million household viewers and gained a 0.05 ratings share among adults aged 18–49. The episode received critical acclaim, with critics praising the new story arcs, performances, directing and character development.

== Plot ==
Following his arrest, (Note: As depicted in "starting now".) Barry (Bill Hader) is now in prison. He calls Gene (Henry Winkler), asking him if he collaborated with Jim Moss (Robert Ray Wisdom) in his capture. When Barry says he loves him, Gene says "I got you" before hanging up. District Attorney Buckner (Charles Parnell) tells Gene that he will be the key witness in Barry's trial. Jim tells Gene that they should avoid press and honor his daughter's memory.

As her flight lands in Joplin, Missouri, Sally (Sarah Goldberg) is contacted by Lindsay (Jessy Hodges) about Barry's arrest and that he was with her when he killed Moss. (Note: As depicted in "Chapter Eight: Know Your Truth".) After her mother Claudia (Romy Rosemont) picks her up, she has a nervous breakdown. After seeing Barry in prison, a frightened Fuches (Stephen Root) makes a deal with the authorities to wear a wire. He approaches Barry to get a confession, but Barry apologizes instead, saying that he was right about Gene and that he regrets taking acting lessons.

Hank (Anthony Carrigan) and Cristobal (Michael Irby) are in a temporary remote house in Santa Fe, New Mexico and are considering retiring from their criminal lives. After learning sand is imported at high prices for construction, Cristobal suggests using his criminal contacts to make money. Hank, who has been struggling with insomnia since the events in Bolivia, does not like the idea. He discovers Barry's arrest after an unfamiliar person picks up Barry's phone, which prompts him to move back to Los Angeles with Cristobal. In Joplin, Sally is disheartened that her father Joe (Michael Dempsey) has turned her bedroom into a man cave. Claudia criticizes how Sally used Sam's name while the family watches the Joplin series, and Sally lashes out at her for not helping her.

Back at prison, Barry lashes out at himself in a bathroom. A guard, Birdwell (Michael Villar), tries to calm him by claiming that despite his crimes, he does not think he is a bad person. Barry provokes Birdwell into attacking him with his baton by saying that he is a cop killer and would kill Birdwell and his family. Barry falls unconscious while being beaten and experiences a childhood memory. The young Barry (Reese Levine) is seen running in a field and hearing his father's voice (John Gloria). After Barry regains consciousness on the floor, Fuches uses his informant status to talk to Barry alone, disposing of his wire. He tends to Barry, apologizing for using him. That night, Gene calls a Vanity Fair reporter named Lon O'Neil (Patrick Fischler), intending to reveal how he caught Barry.

== Production ==
=== Development ===
In April 2023, the episode's title was revealed as "yikes" and it was announced that series creator and lead actor Bill Hader had written and directed the episode. This was Hader's tenth writing credit, and his eleventh directing credit.

=== Writing ===
Bill Hader explained that they wanted an immediate answer to the previous episode's ending, "It became very clear to me that Episode 1 needed to be everybody's kind of dealing with their own personal fallouts, wins and losses from the end of Season 3, and Barry getting caught has to kind of affect that. So that was kind of the drive of it."

Hader explained that Barry's state throughout the episode involved confusion, as the character fails to understand what he did wrong. He explained that Barry abandoning every potential good thing about him as "just because you're hyper-aware of your issues doesn't mean they go away; you still have to manage them. And I think Barry just got tired of managing them."

On Barry's decision to go back with Fuches, Hader explained "He's just been told to fuck off by two the most important people in his life. So you retreat back to those people who are hard on you. Fuches also, like a parent, has unconditional love for Barry. It just shows in a very weird way." As a big plot point of the third season revolved around Fuches wanting an apology from Barry, the episode depicted Barry apologizing to him, which helped Fuches abandon his intentions.

Sally's subplot had a different idea. Originally, she would go to her high school, where she would look at an old photograph of herself during a school performance. A teacher recognized her and removed the photograph to showcase her struggles. Hader deemed that it was "just too much" and decided to scrap it. He addressed Sally's relationship with her mother, "That just kind of gives you a lot of context on what her life was like and how she was treated by her folks. I think that the feeling that we got between those two is that they prove truly that the mother couldn’t handle having like an overdramatic daughter. And Sally just was ignored by her mother from a young age."

Regarding Gene's actions, Henry Winkler explained, "Gene is an asshole. Gene can't help himself. As much as Gene wants to be a big person, [attention] is like crack for him. He needs that spotlight like some other people need heroin."

Originally, the ending would be different. Barry would frequently see his father chastising him for screwing things up, to mirror Sally's subplot. As Sally leaves Barry, Barry would suddenly attack Fuches, only to be stopped when his father tells him not to do it. Hader scrapped it as he considered it "corny", explaining "It's one of those things where you've got to write that stuff to kind of, at least in my experience, you write it to try to understand it and then once you get to that version and you live with it, you get sick of it."

== Reception ==
=== Ratings ===
The episode was watched by 0.274 million viewers, earning a 0.05 in the 18-49 rating demographics on the Nielson ratings scale. This means that 0.05 percent of all households with televisions watched the episode. This was a slight increase from the previous episode, which was watched by 0.221 million viewers with a 0.04 in the 18-49 demographics.

=== Critical reception ===
"yikes" received critical acclaim. On the review aggregator Rotten Tomatoes, it holds an approval rating of 100% based on 6 reviews, with an average rating of 9/10. Matt Schimkowitz of The A.V. Club gave the episode a "B+" and wrote, "Gene's time on top can only last so long, and as the forces of evil gather strength around the old acting teacher, it's only a matter of time before Barry catches up with him. Sadly, Barry has no reason not to kill Mr. Cousineau now. Unless, of course, he's changed."

Alan Sepinwall of Rolling Stone wrote, "In a plotting sense, this is exactly correct. Barry's current predicament ties directly back to his murder of Janice Moss, which happened because he became Gene’s student. And many of the other mistakes he's made — from a criminal standpoint, if not a human one — have come from the way that acting classes forced him to confront all the damage that violence has done to himself and others."

Ben Rosenstock of Vulture gave the episode a perfect 5 star rating out of 5 and wrote, "And yet we see a new side of Barry Berkman in this premiere, barely recognizable in his almost-feral state of disbelief and, later, utter self-hatred. He's stripped down to nothing: desperate, drained, and full-on self-immolating. I'd call it rock bottom if I didn’t suspect it could get much worse in the next seven episodes." Josh Spiegel of /Film wrote, "Fame is a funny thing. Of course, on the HBO series Barry, fame is a terrifyingly dangerous thing. Barry begins its fourth and final season with a two-episode premiere, exploring the darkest possible version of what fame can bring. The hitman-turned-wannabe actor is only ever a halfway-decent actor when he's channeling the immense rage that fuels him, and he's constantly lured back into the hitman lifestyle. But it took three seasons for that lifestyle to catch up with him in tangible ways."
