= 710N =

- Barry episode
- Episode no.: Season 3 Episode 6
- Directed by: Bill Hader
- Written by: Duffy Boudreau
- Cinematography by: Carl Herse
- Editing by: Franky Guttman
- Original air date: May 29, 2022
- Running time: 29 minutes

Guest appearances
- Robert Ray Wisdom as Jim Moss; Vanessa Bayer as Morgan Dawn-Cherry; Jessy Hodges as Lindsay Mandel; Darrell Britt-Gibson as Jermaine Jefrint; Rightor Doyle as Nick Nicholby; Laura San Giacomo as Annie; Fred Melamed as Tom Posorro; James Hiroyuki Liao as Albert Nguyen; Karen David as Sharon Lucado; Gary Kraus as Chief Krauss; Tom Allen as Mitch; Sal Lopez as Anita's Father; Jolene Van Vugt as Traci

Episode chronology
← Previous "crazytimesh*tshow"	Next → "candy asses"

"710N" is the sixth episode of the third season of the American crime tragicomedy television series Barry. It is the 22nd overall episode of the series and was written by Duffy Boudreau, and directed by series co-creator and main actor Bill Hader. It was first broadcast on HBO in the United States on May 29, 2022, and also was available on HBO Max on the same date.

The series follows Barry Berkman, a hitman from Cleveland who travels to Los Angeles to kill someone but finds himself joining an acting class taught by Gene Cousineau, where he meets aspiring actress Sally Reed and begins to question his path in life as he deals with his criminal associates such as Monroe Fuches and NoHo Hank. In the episode, Barry is reunited with Chris's widow and agrees to attend one of her dinners. Meanwhile, Fuches is left for dead by Traci's crew and is saved by a family, making him question his goal of revenge.

According to Nielsen Media Research, the episode was seen by an estimated 0.210 million household viewers and gained a 0.03 ratings share among adults aged 18–49. The episode received universal acclaim, with critics praising the directing, writing, cinematography, performances and ending. Some highlighted the highway chase, which received universal praise for its execution. At the 74th Primetime Emmy Awards, the episode received nominations for Outstanding Directing for a Comedy Series and Outstanding Writing for a Comedy Series.

== Plot ==
At the outskirts, Fuches (Stephen Root) tells Taylor's sister, Traci (Jolene Van Vugt), and her biker gang that Barry (Bill Hader) was supposed to install a hot tub for Taylor nearby and instructs them to confront Barry about it, giving them his address. Suddenly, one of the gang members pulls out a gun and shoots Fuches in the chest. The gang then leaves, leaving Fuches lying on the ground, bleeding.

Albert (James Hiroyuki Liao) continues investigating with the police, refusing to believe that "The Raven" or Hank (Anthony Carrigan) would be involved in Fernando's murder, deeming that a person with military background was involved, only to realize the profile of the killer matches Barry's description. He visits Sharon (Karen David), the widow of Barry's military friend, Chris, to inquire about Barry's whereabouts. Albert is surprised when she tells him that Barry is now taking acting classes and she suggests they should meet. She calls Barry, telling him she is organizing a charity dinner for veterans and wants him to attend that night, which he accepts to do.

Despite cancelling her show, BanShe tells Sally (Sarah Goldberg) that they want her to work on another project, but she is hesitant to accept the offer.

NoHo Hank (Anthony Carrigan) is depressed on finding out that his operation was raided by the cops and that Cristobal (Michael Irby) was straight and married the whole time. He discusses his problems with a local beignet shop worker named Mitch (Tom Allen). Mitch tells Hank to work with him instead; however, Hank makes up his mind to go to Bolivia and rescue Cristobal.

Tom Posorro (Fred Melamed) informs Gene (Henry Winkler) that Bob Jacobson, a powerful producer, wants him to lead his own streaming series, Gene Cousineau MasterClass. Gene will accept but only if Annie (Laura San Giacomo) works on the project. Annie refuses to work with him, although she is moved when Gene offers to give her all his potential money. Back on the outskirts, a man (Sal Lopez) finds Fuches and takes him to his house, where he is tended to by the man's family. He is contacted by Jim (Robert Ray Wisdom), father of Janice Moss, who wants to meet with him to discuss new information. Enjoying his new life and having fallen in love with the man's daughter Anita, Fuches hangs up.

Sally meets with Morgan Dawn-Cherry (Vanessa Bayer), a BanShe executive. She offers Sally a place in the writer's room in the series that replaced Joplin on the homepage, as she feels Sally could improve its critical reception. Sally considers this a downgrade but Lindsay (Jessy Hodges) convinces her to accept the job, as she will earn a good reputation with the executives. Fuches talks with the man who found him, who notes that Anita seems to improve his life, revealing he knows about Anita's feelings towards him and tells him he's a good man, although he tells him he must follow any "sign of God". Fuches then sees a newspaper depicting Barry and Gene, and steals the man's truck. He then calls Jim back, wanting to meet with him to discuss crucial evidence on Janice's murder.

Traci's gang break into Barry's house, finding evidence of his whereabouts. They intercept him while he is driving to the dinner, exposing their intentions in front of him. Barry flees, hitting a biker but crashing his car in the process. He then steals the motorbike but is spotted by the bikers. He then drives onto Interstate 710N and a chase ensues, with Barry managing to leave the freeway while one of the bikers crashes into a car. Barry's bike runs out of gas just as Traci closes in, forcing him to hide in a used car dealership. Traci rides to the roof of the dealership and starts firing, until she is killed by the owner with a shotgun. As police sirens are heard, Barry leaves the dealership amidst the confusion.

Barry makes it to Sharon's house, and eats a beignet. He investigates the events on his phone and finds that the bikers were connected to Taylor. He also finds Fuches' fake contact card on the table, before seeing Sharon coldly staring at him. He soon falls unconscious shortly after realizing Sharon poisoned the beignet.

== Production ==
=== Development ===
In April 2022, the episode's title was revealed as "710N" and it was announced that Duffy Boudreau had written the episode while series co-creator and main actor Bill Hader had directed it. This was Boudreau's third writing credit, and Hader's eighth directing credit.

=== Writing ===
Bill Hader explained that Fuches' storyline came from deciding to toy with the idea of Fuches' goals, saying that the family "it's the universe telling him this is what you should be doing with your life. And because of vengeance and anger, he ignores it and ends up f—ing himself again."

Regarding the ending, Hader planned the storyline for quite some time, feeling that Sharon would be crucial as part of getting revenge against Barry. Hader also said, "And then the nice thing is that forever, it was guacamole. Forever, even in the previews, Barry has guacamole. So he was bringing guacamole over, his guacamole for the chips. But then when we came up with Mitch, that's what he has with him. And she poisons it. So then you have to have a sauce with it. That ended up working well."

While the episode mostly follows the original cut of the episode, Albert's scene in the police station was added in reshoots before his scene with Sharon. Hader commented, "That just seemed to work because he did other takes where it was more sincere and more kind of, he was asking about an old friend. And thank God he did one take that had a bit of a thing to it that made it seem he was leadingly asking her."

Throughout the episode, the characters often talk with Mitch, an employee at a shop named "Beignets by Mitch". The scene originated from the original version of the episode, where Barry, Sally and Hank would talk to different people about their problems. The writers felt the scenes didn't flow naturally and decided to create the character so the characters could express themselves more freely. According to Tom Allen, who portrays Mitch, he was instructed by Hader to "show as little emotion as possible". Another recurring gag was Barry singing a song while driving to meet with Sharon. The song was improvised by Hader, who said "He's trying to just sing that song. He's really excited about seeing his old friends. Again the consequences keep interrupting, and he's just avoiding the consequences."

=== Filming ===
The episode featured an extended sequence where Barry is chased by Traci's biker gang through the Interstate 710N. Part of Hader's inspiration to do it was feeling stuck in traffic while driving through Los Angeles and "having those motorcycles split lanes." He further added, "I think the impetus of it was doing a chase scene, but not making it feel genre, not making it too actiony."

In order to film the scene, the crew had to secure the Pasadena Freeway for three Sundays, from the morning to noon, and having 5 hours to complete filming. For the first day, the crew shot the lane-splitting sequences. For the second day, they filmed Barry entering the freeway. On the final day, they filmed the hand-off.

The cars featured in the sequence were practical, although the cars on the other lane were added in post-production as they could not close the lane. Hader felt satisfied with the sequence, although he admitted that a sequence where the camera stayed behind Barry as he started lane splitting "just didn't have the power that I thought it would have", which was reworked into the final cut.

Hader cut a sequence where the chase extended into a Mail Boxes Etc., deeming it "short-lived". The final part of the chase, which was set on a car dealership, was originally intended to be filmed at a diner but the crew struggled to find a decent diner to properly film the sequence.

== Reception ==
=== Viewers ===
The episode was watched by 0.210 million viewers, earning a 0.03 in the 18-49 rating demographics on the Nielson ratings scale. This means that 0.03 percent of all households with televisions watched the episode. This was a 19% decrease from the previous episode, which was watched by 0.257 million viewers with a 0.04 in the 18-49 demographics.

=== Critical reviews ===
"710N" received universal acclaim. David Cote of The A.V. Club gave the episode an "A" and wrote, "I originally planned to begin with a 1,200-word comparative analysis of the morphology of donuts and beignets, how they symbolize distinct narrative modalities in the world of Barry (holes versus puffy centers). But on second thought, let's simply accept that Barry has moved from sprinkles to powdered sugar on his deep-fried pastries and leave it at that. Why beignets figure so heavily in this episode must remain a mystery. Among many mysteries."

Ben Rosenstock of Vulture gave the episode a 4 star rating out of 5 and wrote, "We're reaching a breaking point for Barry; even if he successfully eliminates the threat of every grieving family member who's trying to kill him, there will be no way to stop the cycle of violence at this point. He can keep turning to bribery for his nonviolent threats (Gene) and 'self-defense' against the people who want to kill him. Eventually he's going to have to surrender to the punishment his victims choose. He can't always have it his way. That's more than he deserves." Nick Harley of Den of Geek gave the episode a perfect 5 star rating out of 5 and wrote, "While Barry continues to juggle multiple balls in the air, this episode felt much more focused, with more connective tissue and a big action set-piece to bring things back to Barry. The idea of turning the families of all of Barry's victims into a relentless revenge army is so smart and I can't wait to see just how much more tangled it all becomes. Knowing that Bill Hader and Alec Berg have a fourth season already mapped makes this development more exciting, because it portends things will just get more out of hand from here."

"710N" was named one of the best TV episodes of 2022 by many publications, with Salon placing it at number one. Mashable SEA ranked it at number five, while IndieWire and Mashable ranked it at number 10 in their respective list. Alan Sepinwall included the episode on his "Top 25 Best TV Episodes of 2022" list. The New York Times also named it one of the best episodes of the year.

=== Accolades ===
The episode was nominated for Outstanding Directing for a Comedy Series and Outstanding Writing for a Comedy Series at the 74th Primetime Emmy Awards. It also received a nomination for Outstanding Stunt Performance. It won the Directors Guild of America Award for Outstanding Directing in a Comedy Series at the 75th Directors Guild of America Awards.
