= Candy asses =

"candy asses"
- Barry episode
- Episode no.: Season 3 Episode 7
- Directed by: Bill Hader
- Written by: Liz Sarnoff
- Cinematography by: Carl Herse
- Editing by: Franky Guttman
- Original air date: June 5, 2022
- Running time: 33 minutes

Guest appearances
- Glenn Fleshler as Goran Pazar; Robert Ray Wisdom as Jim Moss; D'Arcy Carden as Natalie Greer; Jessy Hodges as Lindsay Mandel; Miguel Sandoval as Fernando; Laura San Giacomo as Annie Eisner; Fred Melamed as Tom Posorro; James Hiroyuki Liao as Albert Nguyen; Michael Bofshever as George Krempf; Karen David as Sharon Lucado; Gary Kraus as Chief Krauss; Phil Reeves as Bob Jacobson; Chris Coppola as Mel; Nick Gracer as Yandal; Turhan Troy Caylak as Akhmal; Chris Marquette as Chris Lucado; Cullen Douglas as Charles; Todd Weeks as Jeff; Patricia Fa'asua as Esther; Mark Ivanir as Vacha/Ruslan; Nikita Bogolyubov as Mayrbek; Jolene Van Vugt as Traci

Episode chronology
← Previous "710N"	Next → "starting now"

"candy asses" is the seventh episode of the third season of the American crime tragicomedy television series Barry. It is the 23rd overall episode of the series and was written by executive producer Liz Sarnoff, and directed by series co-creator and main actor Bill Hader. It was first broadcast on HBO in the United States on June 5, 2022, and also was available on HBO Max on the same date.

The series follows Barry Berkman, a hitman from Cleveland who travels to Los Angeles to kill someone but finds himself joining an acting class taught by Gene Cousineau, where he meets aspiring actress Sally Reed and begins to question his path in life as he deals with his criminal associates such as Monroe Fuches and NoHo Hank. In the episode, Barry experiences a dream-like state after being poisoned. Meanwhile, Sally gets in a major controversy while Fuches is brought to answer some questions regarding his role in Moss' death.

According to Nielsen Media Research, the episode was seen by an estimated 0.261 million household viewers and gained a 0.05 ratings share among adults aged 18–49. The episode received critical acclaim from critics for its directing, writing (particularly Barry's lack of dialogue), cinematography and acting.

== Plot ==
George Krempf (Michael Bofshever), Ryan Madison's father, stands at a church service while everyone sits. Barry (Bill Hader) starts convulsing after being poisoned by Sharon (Karen David), who puts a blanket on him and leaves. The next morning, he stumbles out of the house, hallucinating himself walking directly out of the suburbs onto a beach, approaching a crowd standing still and looking out towards the sea.

Sally (Sarah Goldberg) wins over the writers' room of The New Medusas by questioning the showrunner on the show's over-sexualized content. However, she is livid when she discovers that Natalie (D'Arcy Carden) managed to get her own series that is similar to Joplin, but has been tailored to BanShe's algorithm. Sally confronts her and screams vulgarities in Natalie's face. Later, Lindsay (Jessy Hodges) informs Sally that she was fired from BanShe after Natalie leaked a recording of the altercation to the media. Meanwhile, Gene (Henry Winkler) has started his MasterClass acting course, with Annie (Laura San Giacomo) directing despite her years-long absence from the industry.

In Bolivia, Hank (Anthony Carrigan) tries to find Cristobal and is captured by Elena's men. He is taken to a cell, where he discovers that Akhmal (Troy Caylak) and Yandar (Nick Gracer) are in the next cell and planning to escape. Sally issues a statement that Lindsay views as a backhanded apology and damage control. A frustrated Sally blows up at Lindsay, who quits as her agent.

Fuches (Stephen Root) visits Moss's father Jim (Robert Ray Wisdom), a Vietnam War veteran and former SERE instructor to discuss Barry's role in Moss's death. Jim instead takes Fuches to the police, where Dunn (Sarah Burns) identifies him as "The Raven". Jim grows suspicious when he learns that Gene also blamed Barry. Jim questions Gene at the MasterClass wrap party about Barry. Gene claims Barry is a good person, but Jim notices sweat on Gene's forehead.

Still suffering from the hallucinatory effects of the poison, Barry is taken by George to a hospital parking lot. With a gun beside him, George laments his son's death. Barry imagines himself reaching the crowd on the beach, which is full of people he has killed, including Chris (Chris Marquette) and Goran Pazar (Glenn Fleshler). He suddenly wakes up while being rushed to the emergency room and sees George has fatally shot himself.

Albert (James Hiroyuki Liao), who has also grown suspicious about Barry, questions Fuches with the cameras in the interrogation room off. Realizing who Albert is, Fuches admits his role in turning Barry into a hitman, and slyly reveals Barry's role in Chris' death. A shaken Albert leaves the station, taking his gun from his desk.

== Production ==
=== Development ===
In April 2022, the episode's title was revealed as "candy asses" and it was announced that executive producer Liz Sarnoff had written the episode while series co-creator and main actor Bill Hader had directed it. This was Sarnoff's third writing credit, and Hader's ninth directing credit.

=== Writing ===
Originally, the opening scene at the church was longer and involved a sequence where Ryan's mother claims her son was influenced by the Devil, while George would keep looking at Fuches' PI card, which would then have a match cut to the events at the house. Bill Hader decided to cut it, as he felt the match cuts were feeling over-used at that point in the series. The episode also omitted music when the series' title card shows, as Hader felt "Now it officially gets dark."

Annie's lack of practice in directing came about in discussions on-set between Hader and actor Laura San Giacomo, who felt it would not only be realistic but Annie would desperately try to hide it from Gene. This served a double-purpose of highlighting Gene's new role, as Hader views him: "He's very happy, and feeling great about himself, but he's still doing it for himself. He doesn't really care. So, it was important to show what is her little arc in the episode, which is, 'I don't know what I'm doing, but I can't let him know it.'"

When questioned about the dream sequences, Hader stated that he viewed the ocean as a representation of freedom, while he viewed the desert as a representation of death. Hader himself admits that he struggled to identify the meaning behind the beach and the people in it, saying "they're all waiting to be either taken some place or denounced, or... I don't really know what's happening." The sequence would have involved Barry hanging out with some of his victims and some faces popping up in the clouds, deeming it "very David Lynch". During post-production, Hader noticed that the only scene that he felt had an impact on him was when Chris stares at Barry, so he decided to scrap the original plan, "it doesn't want to work. This isn't leading with emotion, this is leading with a big idea. The emotion of the scene is about Chris, so let's just make it about Chris". Hader interprets the scene as Chris not recognizing Barry.

Sally's outburst at Lindsay while walking near a black background was viewed by Hader as "Sally backing into darkness". He further added, "That was something that we worked on, and Sarah Goldberg did that, and that's an incredibly tough thing to do. And that's the first take. We said, 'Let's just try it, to see if we can do it. This is going to be tough, because you have to back up and everything.' And she did it perfect."

Barry's encounter with George was originally different. George would show up at Barry's apartment, where his roommates were having a party with some acting class students and then a shooting happened, with some dying, with Hader saying "The idea was that Barry's community that he's trying to get back together, his past comes back and destroys it." Some writers opposed to the idea while Hader defended it. However, Hader changed his mind after a conversation with writer Duffy Boudreau, feeling that the moment needs to be with just Barry and George.

Stephen Root commented on the last scene of the episode, "Even though James is there, and has lines, it's kind of a monologue from me, trying to figure out from the middle of this conversation, how can I take this over, and make him go do what I want to do? So we ended up using one close up take of me trying to convince him. So I'm glad that worked out, I thought it worked for the piece."

== Reception ==
=== Viewers ===
The episode was watched by 0.261 million viewers, earning a 0.05 in the 18-49 rating demographics on the Nielson ratings scale. This means that 0.05 percent of all households with televisions watched the episode. This was a 24% increase from the previous episode, which was watched by 0.210 million viewers with a 0.03 in the 18-49 demographics.

=== Critical reviews ===
"candy asses" received critical acclaim. David Cote of The A.V. Club gave the episode an "A" and wrote, "In lieu of grisly, graphic violence (Sharon torturing Barry in her basement?) we get an episode that continues the super-stuffed, kudzu-fast plotting we have come to expect all season, as well as a couple of crazy reversals, a Terrence Malick-y fever dream, and one of those big narrative ironies that make the series such a feat of engineering."

Ben Rosenstock of Vulture gave the episode a perfect 5 star rating out of 5 and wrote, "Bill Hader doesn't speak a single full word in 'Candy Asses', the penultimate episode of Barry's third season. For Barry, this is an episode of introspection: thinking about what he's done and whom he's hurt the most. His voice, for once, is taken from him; there's no opportunity to rationalize, backpedal, or glean some false message of empowerment from a lazy attempt at redemption. He's here to listen." Nick Harley of Den of Geek wrote, "Barry has been moving at a break-neck pace while taking all its characters to darker, slightly stranger territory. The show has been providing big moments weekly, and with an already impressive history for shocking finales, next week's episode has a high bar to clear. Luckily, Bill Hader and team seem more than equipped to deliver. The teaser for next week showed a makeshift gravesite like the one that opened the season. In that moment, Jeff was denied forgiveness. Will Barry meet the same fate?"
