= The Escape (What We Do in the Shadows) =

- What We Do in the Shadows episode
- Episode no.: Season 3 Episode 6
- Directed by: Yana Gorskaya
- Written by: Jake Bender; Zach Dunn
- Cinematography by: DJ Stipsen
- Editing by: Yana Gorskaya; Dane McMaster
- Production code: XWS03006
- Original air date: September 30, 2021
- Running time: 24 minutes

Guest appearances
- Doug Jones as Baron Afanas; Julie Klausner as Gargoyle #1; Cole Escola as Gargoyle #2; Kristen Schaal as The Guide

Episode chronology
← Previous "The Chamber of Judgement"	Next → "The Siren"

"The Escape" is the sixth episode of the third season of the American mockumentary comedy horror television series What We Do in the Shadows, set in the franchise of the same name. It is the 26th overall episode of the series and was written by Jake Bender and Zach Dunn, and directed by co-executive producer Yana Gorskaya. It was released on FX on September 30, 2021.

The series is set in Staten Island, New York City. Like the 2014 film, the series follows the lives of vampires in the city. These consist of three vampires, Nandor, Laszlo, and Nadja. They live alongside Colin Robinson, an energy vampire; and Guillermo, Nandor's familiar. The series explores the absurdity and misfortunes experienced by the vampires. In the episode, the Sire escapes from confinement, prompting the vampires to go after him as they fear his death could cause their own deaths.

According to Nielsen Media Research, the episode was seen by an estimated 0.416 million household viewers and gained a 0.16 ratings share among adults aged 18–49. The episode received critical acclaim, who praised the humor, performances, character development and tone.

== Plot ==
Nandor (Kayvan Novak) and Nadja (Natasia Demetriou) discover the Chamber of Curiosities ramshackled. They are then horrified to discover that the Sire has escaped from confinement, as starvation prompted him to escape through a tunnel. Nadja realizes she forgot to ask Nandor to feed him, but she still blames him for the incident.

Nandor summons a meeting with vampiric journalists to explain the escape. However, he ends up panicking the vampires by suggesting the belief that if the Sire dies, every single vampire will die. Laszlo (Matt Berry) does not believe in it, given that the Baron Afanas turned him and Nadja in vampires, and his death did not impact them. Nevertheless, he and Colin Robinson (Mark Proksch) decide to check the body to make sure. They are surprised to discover the Baron (Doug Jones) alive, albeit with just the upper half of his body. The Baron was kept alive when Laszlo poured blood over his corpse during his burial, and he used his only arm to dig himself through the yard and feed himself through victims' blood. Guillermo (Harvey Guillén) is scared at the reveal, as he was responsible for accidentally exposing him to sunlight.

The Baron's re-appearance scares the vampires, as it may prove the belief to be true. Guillermo decides to help them, having Nadja and the Guide (Kristen Schaal) ask living gargoyles for any clue. They direct the group to Ozone Park, Queens, where the Sire was seen. The group encounters the Sire at a department store, who fends them off. They intend to use Guillermo as bait, but Nandor decides to do it himself due to his mistake. Before the Sire kills him, the Baron realizes that only he speaks the Sire's language and communicates with him. He states that the Sire doesn't want to be killed and was just hungry, but warns that he will kill the vampires if they try to put him back in the cell. To please the Sire, the vampires send him to live in Nutley, New Jersey with the Baron and Guillermo's hellhound, which is revealed to breathe fire. To feed themselves, they use their home as an Airbnb to attract people. Later, Nandor declares to the vampiric journalists, "we got him."

== Production ==
=== Development ===
In August 2021, FX confirmed that the sixth episode of the season would be titled "The Escape", and that it would be written by Jake Bender and Zach Dunn, and directed by co-executive producer Yana Gorskaya. This was Bender's second writing credit, Dunn's second writing credit, and Gorskaya's fifth directing credit.

== Reception ==
=== Viewers ===
In its original American broadcast, "The Escape" was seen by an estimated 0.416 million household viewers with a 0.16 in the 18-49 demographics. This means that 0.16 percent of all households with televisions watched the episode. This was a slight increase in viewership from the previous episode, which was watched by 0.399 million household viewers with a 0.14 in the 18-49 demographics.

=== Critical reviews ===
"The Escape" received critical acclaim. Katie Rife of The A.V. Club gave the episode an "A" grade and wrote, "This was an ambitious episode in terms of effects and locations, and dare I say, they pulled it off. The vampires actually did their jobs semi-correctly for once as well, although not without some assistance. I'd be curious to know what newer viewers who haven't been writing a thousand words a week about this show since it started airing think about these more internal lore-heavy storylines."

Tony Sokol of Den of Geek gave the episode a 4 star rating out of 5 and wrote, "'The Escape' is a slight departure for What We Do in the Shadows. The vampires have never been this openly vulnerable, and it is scary how much more comic this makes them." Melody McCune of Telltale TV gave the episode a 4.5 star rating out of 5 and wrote, "Overall, What We Do in the Shadows knocks another cracking episode out of the park with every aspect of it firing on all cylinders, including stellar performances, great guest appearances, cheeky quips, intricate mythology, and enviably macabre aesthetics."

Alejandra Bodden of Bleeding Cool gave the episode an 8.5 out of 10 rating and wrote, "This week's episode of FX's What We Do in the Shadows 'The Escape' was another impressive episode to add to this season's repertoire. I have been enjoying the new sides we are getting to know of the characters we have been following for so long." Greg Wheeler of Review Geek gave the episode a 4.5 star out of 5 rating and wrote, "What We Do In The Shadows returns with one of its best episodes of the season, bringing back some old faces and progressing each of the characters in a meaningful way."
