= The Chamber of Judgement =

- What We Do in the Shadows episode
- Episode no.: Season 3 Episode 5
- Directed by: Kyle Newacheck
- Written by: William Meny
- Cinematography by: DJ Stipsen
- Editing by: Dane McMaster; Daniel Haworth
- Production code: XWS03005
- Original air date: September 23, 2021
- Running time: 25 minutes

Guest appearances
- Anthony Atamanuik as Sean Rinaldi; Gavin Fox as Frank; Kristen Schaal as The Guide; Chris Sandiford as Derek

Episode chronology
← Previous "The Casino"	Next → "The Escape"

"The Chamber of Judgement" is the fifth episode of the third season of the American mockumentary comedy horror television series What We Do in the Shadows, set in the franchise of the same name. It is the 25th overall episode of the series and was written by William Meny, and directed by co-executive producer Kyle Newacheck. It was released on FX on September 23, 2021.

The series is set in Staten Island, New York City. Like the 2014 film, the series follows the lives of vampires in the city. These consist of three vampires, Nandor, Laszlo, and Nadja. They live alongside Colin Robinson, an energy vampire; and Guillermo, Nandor's familiar. The series explores the absurdity and misfortunes experienced by the vampires. In the episode, Nandor and Nadja preside their first Tribunal, while Laszlo tries to help Sean with a problem.

According to Nielsen Media Research, the episode was seen by an estimated 0.399 million household viewers and gained a 0.14 ratings share among adults aged 18–49. The episode received positive reviews from critics, who praised the performances and callback to previous episodes.

== Plot ==
While Nandor (Kayvan Novak) and Nadja (Natasia Demetriou) prepare to preside over their first Vampiric Council Tribunal, Laszlo (Matt Berry) and Colin Robinson (Mark Proksch) join Sean (Anthony Atamanuik) for a "boys night out" at his house. Colin Robinson also brings along a board game, intending for them to play for hours.

As the Tribunal requires someone on the throne, Guillermo (Harvey Guillén) manipulates his way in convincing Nadja and Nandor in letting him sit. As they begin the sentences, Guillermo is shocked when they bring Derek as a prisoner, a former member of the Mosquito Club of amateur vampire hunters. After the raid at the vampire house, he was turned into a vampire, and has now brought public attention to the vampires, even buying a hellhound. Despite Guillermo's suggestion of mercy, they sentence Derek to be sent to the Well of Daylight, where he will be exposed to the sunrise and die. Feeling guilty, Guillermo provides him a wardrobe to cover himself from the sunlight. Meanwhile, Sean tries to get his friends in buying a pillow he recently bought, which is priced at $49.99. When no one complies, Sean angrily leaves. Laszlo talks to him, discovering that Sean got involved in a pyramid scheme. After he failed to repay the man for the enormous amount of pillows he acquired, Sean is being taken to a small claims court.

Laszlo decides to help Sean at the court, presenting himself and Colin Robinson as his representatives. Nevertheless, Sean loses the case, forced to pay $12,700. Angry, Laszlo feeds on drunk people, causing him to get drunk himself. Seizing this, Guillermo has him act as Derek's attorney, explaining that he will guide Derek through his vampire process. Although reluctant, Nandor and Nadja agree to the terms and allow Derek to walk free. Guillermo also decides to unleash the hellhound, which is revealed to be a normal dog. Despite the vampires' fear of the dog, Guillermo decides to adopt it. As part of the deal, Derek is assigned to sell all of Sean's pillows in order to recoup the investment, using hypnosis on many residents.

== Production ==
=== Development ===
In August 2021, FX confirmed that the fifth episode of the season would be titled "The Chamber of Judgement", and that it would be written by William Meny, and directed by co-executive producer Kyle Newacheck. This was Meny's second writing credit, and Newacheck's eighth directing credit.

== Reception ==
=== Viewers ===
In its original American broadcast, "The Chamber of Judgement" was seen by an estimated 0.399 million household viewers with a 0.14 in the 18-49 demographics. This means that 0.14 percent of all households with televisions watched the episode. This was a 14% decrease in viewership from the previous episode, which was watched by 0.462 million household viewers with a 0.13 in the 18-49 demographics.

=== Critical reviews ===
"The Chamber of Judgement" received positive reviews from critics. Katie Rife of The A.V. Club gave the episode a "B" grade and wrote, "This week, it's back to work for everyone, for an episode that hit certain key themes and moved certain parts of the plot forward, but didn't come together as dazzlingly as 'The Casino' did. I still laughed out loud at several points, don't get me wrong — as I've said before, this show is like pizza, in that it's never anything less than pretty good. It's just that some episodes are a little spicier (and more quotable) than others."

Tony Sokol of Den of Geek gave the episode a 4 star rating out of 5 and wrote, "'The Chamber of Judgement' weighs heavily in What We Do in the Shadows' favor. We've had our fill of the neighbors, and the energy vampire needs an inspiration infusion, but Nadja's intolerance, Nandor's indecisiveness, and Laszlo's indiscretions overrule the objections." Melody McCune of Telltale TV gave the episode a 4 star rating out of 5 and wrote, "This show continues to push the horror-comedy envelope in every way, from its top-tier acting to its consistent writing and perfectly (un)deadpan humor, and the only direction What We Do in the Shadows can go is up (and out of the Well of Daylight)."

Alejandra Bodden of Bleeding Cool gave the episode an 8.5 out of 10 rating and wrote, "This week's episode of FX's What We Do in the Shadows, 'The Chamber of Judgement', was another success for this season so far. The show has had a pretty strong start this season. The episode had me laughing from beginning to end, and of course, feeling uncomfortable because of situation's our vampires find themselves in." Greg Wheeler of Review Geek gave the episode a 4 star out of 5 rating and wrote, "What We Do In The Shadows rolls round with another fine episode, one that continues to pile on the humour while progressing the lore nicely across this show."
