= The Siren (What We Do in the Shadows) =

- What We Do in the Shadows episode
- Episode no.: Season 3 Episode 7
- Directed by: Yana Gorskaya
- Written by: Shana Gohd
- Cinematography by: DJ Stipsen
- Editing by: Yana Gorskaya; Dane McMaster
- Production code: XWS03007
- Original air date: October 7, 2021
- Running time: 25 minutes

Guest appearances
- Scott Bakula as Himself; Catherine Cohen as Sheila; Kristen Schaal as The Guide

Episode chronology
← Previous "The Escape"	Next → "The Wellness Center"

"The Siren" is the seventh episode of the third season of the American mockumentary comedy horror television series What We Do in the Shadows, set in the franchise of the same name. It is the 27th overall episode of the series and was written by Shana Gohd, and directed by co-executive producer Yana Gorskaya. It was released on FX on October 7, 2021.

The series is set in Staten Island, New York City. Like the 2014 film, the series follows the lives of vampires in the city. These consist of three vampires, Nandor, Laszlo, and Nadja. They live alongside Colin Robinson, an energy vampire; and Guillermo, Nandor's familiar. The series explores the absurdity and misfortunes experienced by the vampires. In the episode, Nadja's ghost escapes after feeling underappreciated, while Laszlo and Colin Robinson fall under the spell of a siren.

According to Nielsen Media Research, the episode was seen by an estimated 0.326 million household viewers and gained a 0.15 ratings share among adults aged 18–49. The episode received very positive reviews, who praised the performances, humor and tone shifting.

== Plot ==
At Mariners Harbor, Staten Island, Laszlo (Matt Berry) and Colin Robinson (Mark Proksch) prepare to seize a boat, which is currently hosting a party. Laszlo infiltrates the boat and kills some of the partygoers, prompting the others to flee in fear. After disposing of the bodies, they take the boat to sail.

Nandor (Kayvan Novak) and Nadja (Natasia Demetriou) have been alternating days when running the Council, which just causes trouble as their actions contradict each other. Nadja's ghost starts feeling underappreciated, as the vampires now ignore her existence, prompting her to leave the house. After realizing her absence, Nadja, Nandor and Guillermo (Harvey Guillén) leave to find her. Meanwhile, Laszlo and Colin Robinson head to Plum Island, where Colin Robinson believes he will find the answers to the origins of energy vampires. On their way, they are distracted by a song, which none of them can recognize. They arrive at an island, encountering the woman who was singing, Sheila (Catherine Cohen), who is revealed to be a siren. They dislike her appearance and are horrified to discover she ate many people. They also are unable to leave, as her singing compels them to stay. Before she prepares to eat them, Laszlo escapes by shifting into a bat, planning to help Colin Robinson when he returns.

Nadja, Nandor and Guillermo struggle in keeping up with Nadja's ghost, who takes many forms, before eventually taking over an inflatable rat and escaping. They eventually catch up with her, where Nandor accidentally deflates the rat. Nadja then reconnects with the ghost, who agrees to once again possess the doll. Laszlo meets with Guillermo to ask for help. Guillermo takes him to Best Buy to get noise-cancelling headphones. He returns to the island, where Colin Robinson has now been singing with Sheila, having fallen in love with her. Laszlo uses the headphones for himself and Colin Robinson and flies off, devastating Sheila. However, one of the documentary crew is left behind, suggesting that Sheila eats him. Back at the house, Colin Robinson keeps a recording of the siren's singing for himself.

== Production ==
=== Development ===
In September 2021, FX confirmed that the seventh episode of the season would be titled "The Siren", and that it would be written by Shana Gohd, and directed by co-executive producer Yana Gorskaya. This was Gohd's second writing credit, and Gorskaya's sixth directing credit.

== Reception ==
=== Viewers ===
In its original American broadcast, "The Siren" was seen by an estimated 0.326 million household viewers with a 0.15 in the 18-49 demographics. This means that 0.15 percent of all households with televisions watched the episode. This was a 22% decrease in viewership from the previous episode, which was watched by 0.416 million household viewers with a 0.16 in the 18-49 demographics.

=== Critical reviews ===
"The Siren" received very positive reviews from critics. Katie Rife of The A.V. Club gave the episode a "B+" grade and wrote, "Season three of What We Do In The Shadows has alternated between standalone adventures that bring the entire cast together and more traditional sitcom episodes with an A-plot and a B-plot. 'The Siren' is one of the latter. I have a well-established preference for the former, but this week's episode still kept things lively even as the gang was scattered across the city and the filthy waters that surround it."

Tony Sokol of Den of Geek gave the episode a 4 star rating out of 5 and wrote, "The series has been playing up on the vampires' true vulnerabilities over the past few weeks. Not just the need to avoid the sun or holy water, but emotional scars which are sadly bloodless and not very nutritious. They make for satisfying comedy though, but run the danger of softening the self-absorbed immortal beings at the center of What We Do in the Shadows." Melody McCune of Telltale TV gave the episode a 4 star rating out of 5 and wrote, "'The Siren' is a kooky, wickedly fun episode supported by solid performances from Berry and Demetriou, outlandish folklore, plenty of slapstick, and one giant, inflatable Pizza Rat."

Alejandra Bodden of Bleeding Cool gave the episode an 8 out of 10 rating and wrote, "Once again, another good episode for this season. It was an emotionally charged episode, to be honest." Greg Wheeler of Review Geek gave the episode a 4 star out of 5 rating and wrote, "What We Do In The Shadows returns with another good episode, this time with Laszlo and Colin mixed up with a siren while Nadja's doll is brought back to the forefront of this story through a nicely written plot about her insecurities."
