= 74th Primetime Emmy Awards =

2022 American television programming awards

- Promotional poster
- Date: September 12, 2022 (Ceremony); September 3–4, 2022 (Creative Arts Emmys)
- Location: Microsoft Theater; Los Angeles, California
- Presented by: Academy of Television Arts & Sciences
- Hosted by: Kenan Thompson

Highlights
- Most awards: Major: The White Lotus (5); All: The White Lotus (10)
- Most nominations: Major: Succession (12); All: Succession (25)
- Comedy Series: Ted Lasso
- Drama Series: Succession
- Limited or Anthology Series: The White Lotus

Television/radio coverage
- Network: NBC; Peacock
- Runtime: 3 hours, 3 minutes
- Viewership: 5.92 million
- Produced by: Done and Dusted; Hudlin Entertainment
- Directed by: Hamish Hamilton

The 74th Primetime Emmy Awards honored the best in American prime time television programming from June 1, 2021, until May 31, 2022, as chosen by the Academy of Television Arts & Sciences. The awards ceremony was held live on September 12, 2022, and was preceded by the 74th Primetime Creative Arts Emmy Awards on September 3 and 4, at the Microsoft Theater in Downtown Los Angeles, California. The ceremony was broadcast in the United States on NBC and Peacock. During the ceremony, Emmy Awards were handed out in 25 categories. The event was produced through Done and Dusted and Hudlin Entertainment and was directed by Hamish Hamilton. Kenan Thompson was the ceremony's host.

At the main ceremony, The White Lotus received the most awards with five, including Outstanding Limited or Anthology Series. Ted Lasso won four awards, including its second consecutive award for Outstanding Comedy Series, while Abbott Elementary won two awards and Hacks won one. Succession led all dramas with three wins, including its second Outstanding Drama Series win; Squid Game received two awards, and Euphoria and Ozark received one each. Other winning programs include Dopesick, The Dropout, Jerrod Carmichael: Rothaniel, Last Week Tonight with John Oliver, Lizzo's Watch Out for the Big Grrrls, and Saturday Night Live. Including Creative Arts Emmys, The White Lotus led all programs with 10 wins; HBO and HBO Max led all networks and platforms with 38 total wins.

== Winners and nominees ==
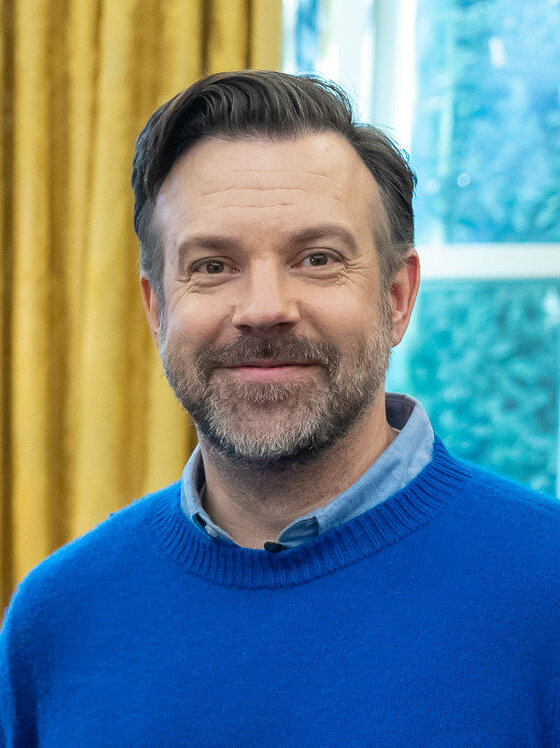
Jason Sudeikis, Outstanding Lead Actor in a Comedy Series winner

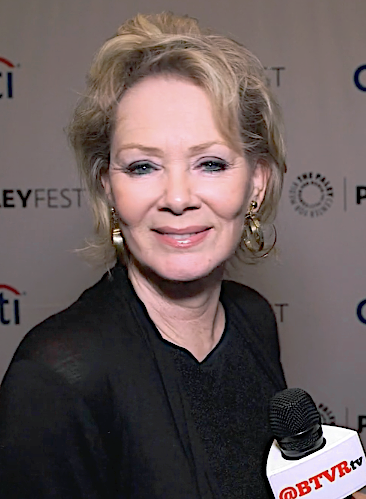
Jean Smart, Outstanding Lead Actress in a Comedy Series winner

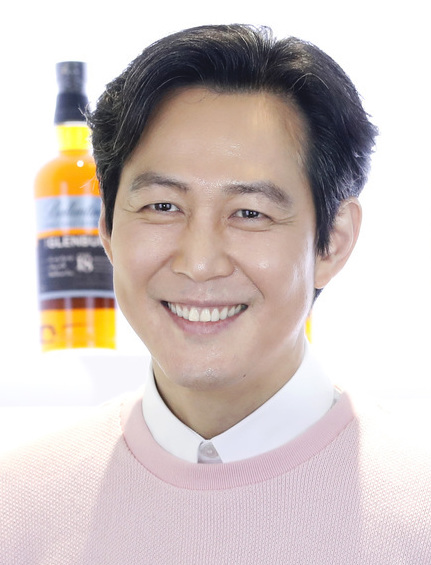
Lee Jung-jae, Outstanding Lead Actor in a Drama Series winner

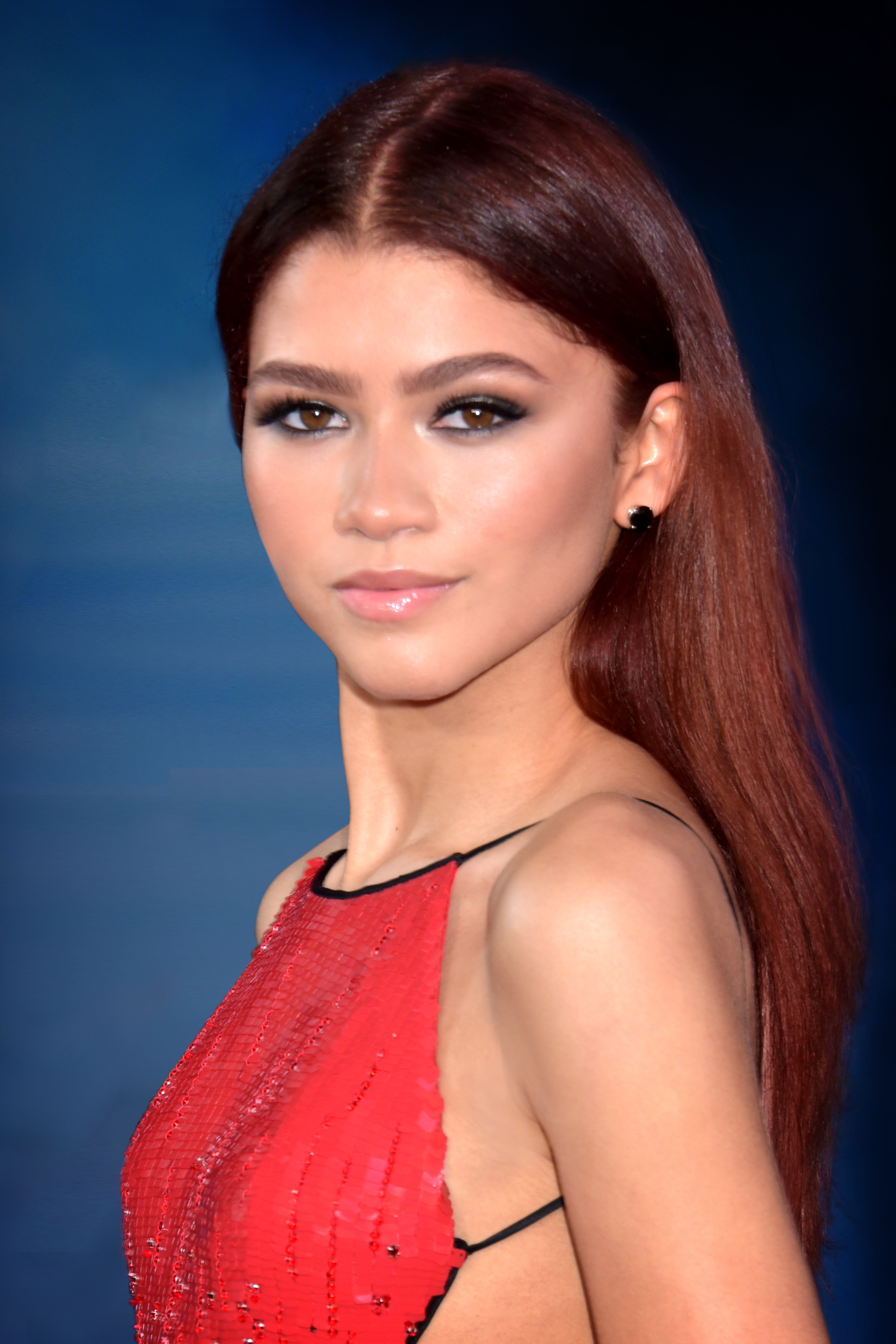
Zendaya, Outstanding Lead Actress in a Drama Series winner

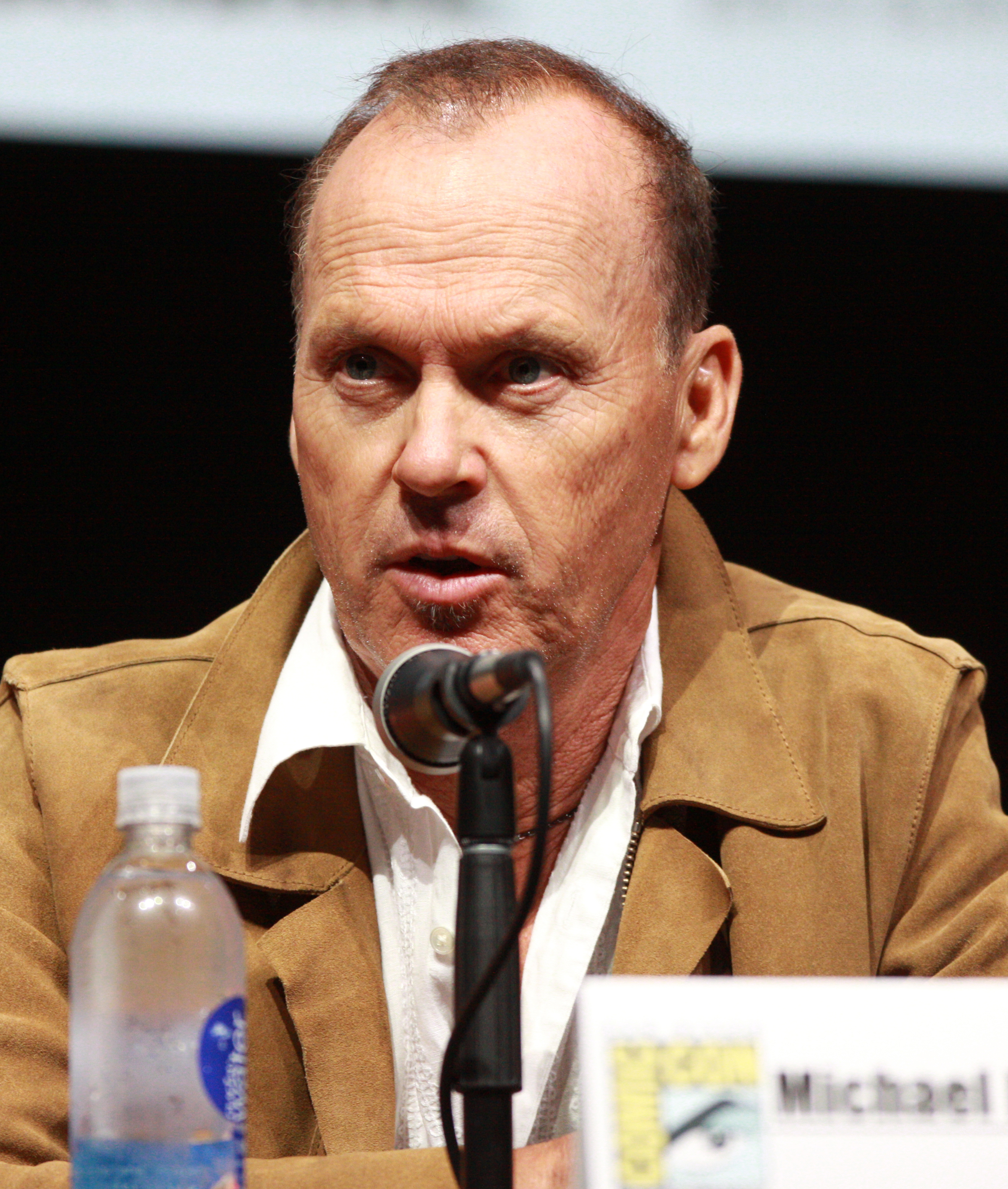
Michael Keaton, Outstanding Lead Actor in a Limited or Anthology Series or Movie winner

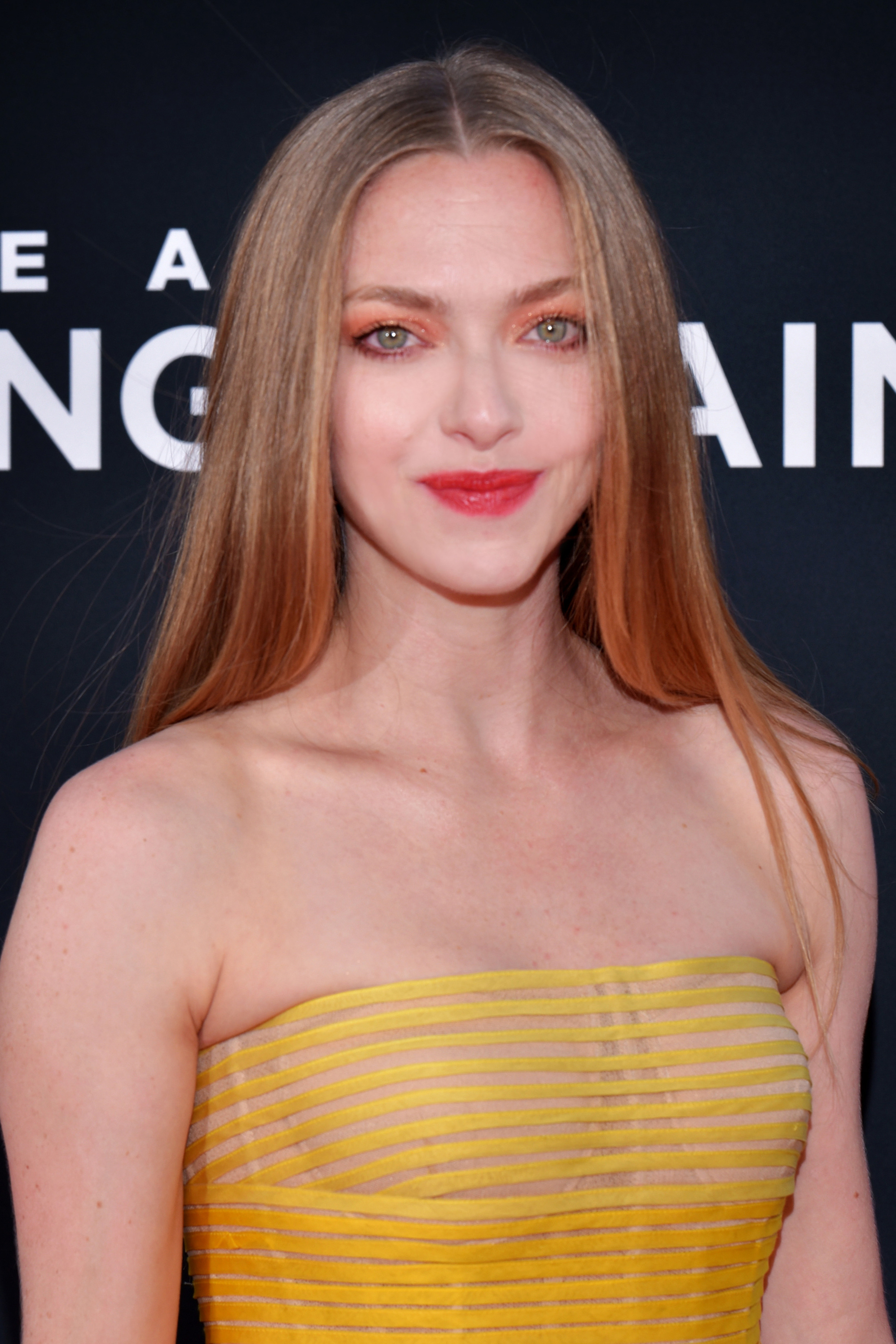
Amanda Seyfried, Outstanding Lead Actress in a Limited or Anthology Series or Movie winner

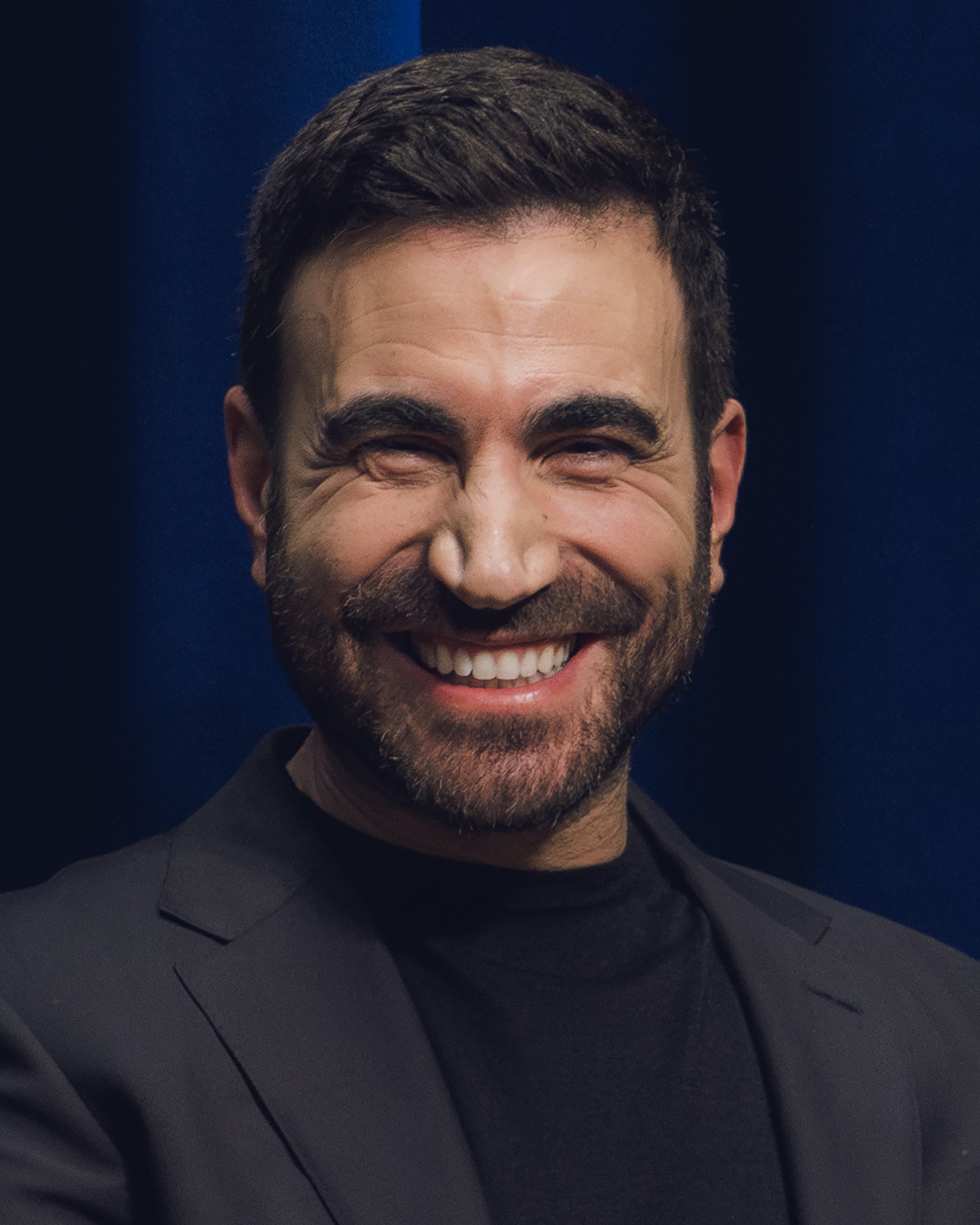
Brett Goldstein, Outstanding Supporting Actor in a Comedy Series winner

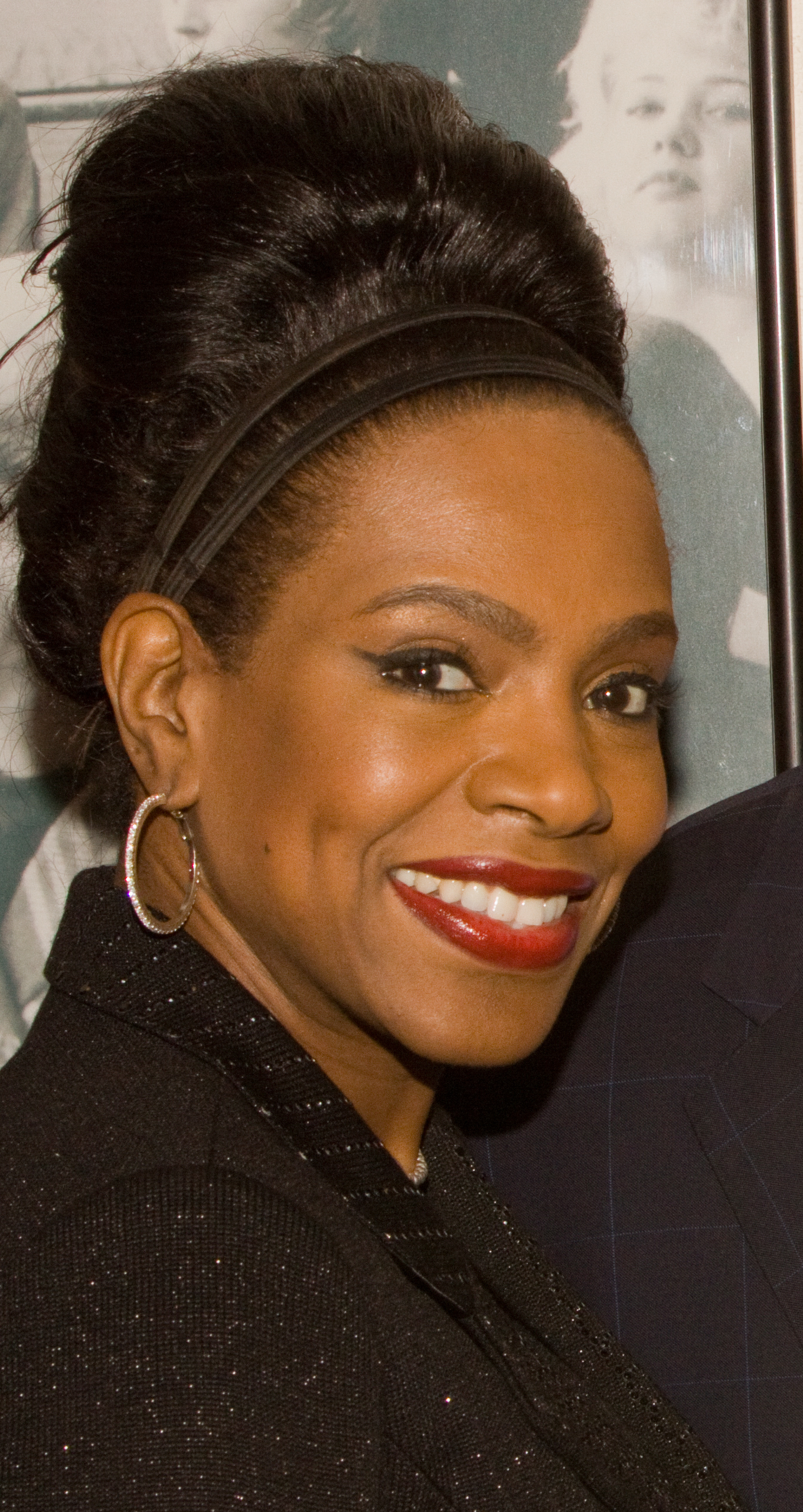
Sheryl Lee Ralph, Outstanding Supporting Actress in a Comedy Series winner

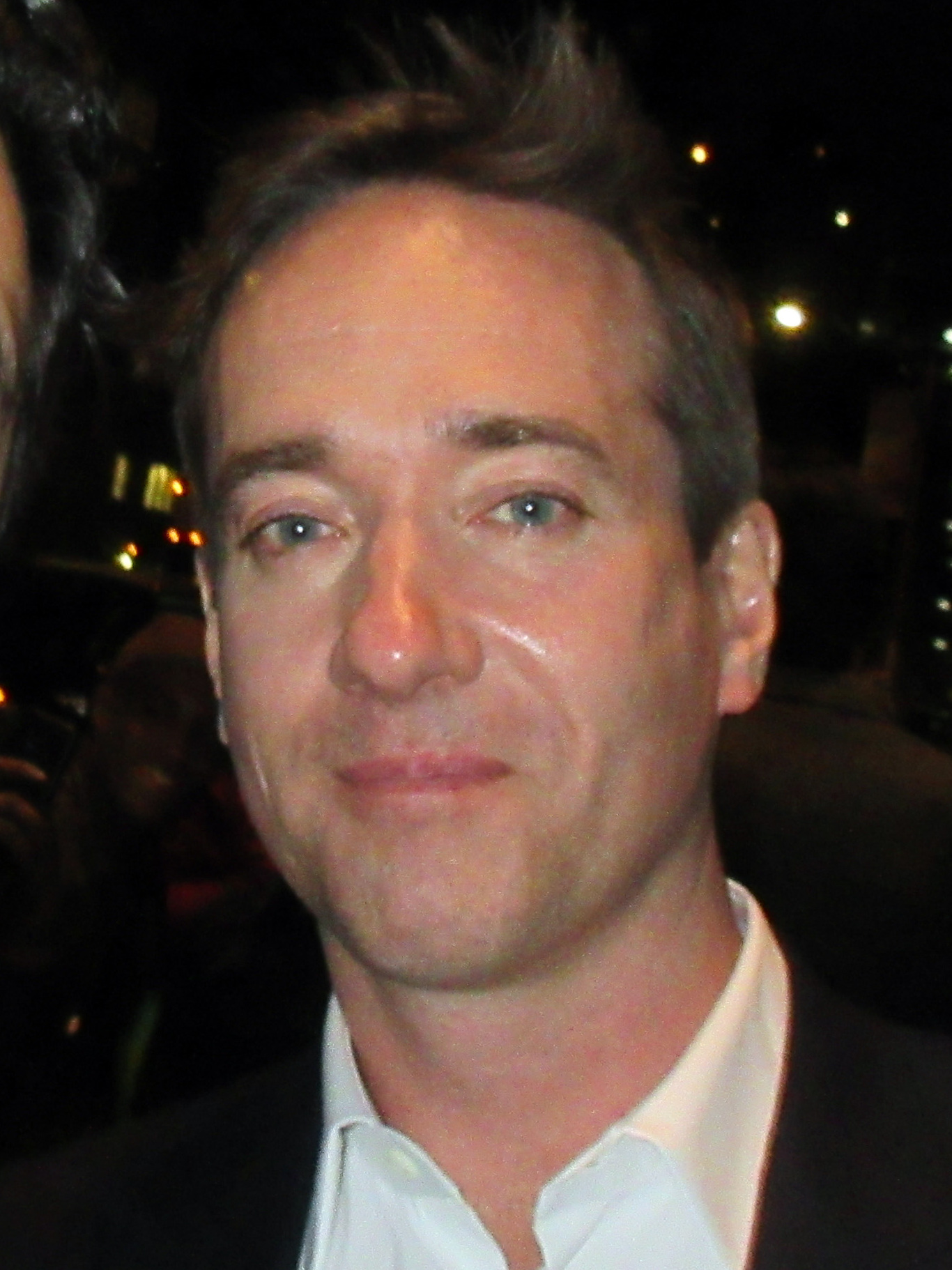
Matthew Macfadyen, Outstanding Supporting Actor in a Drama Series winner

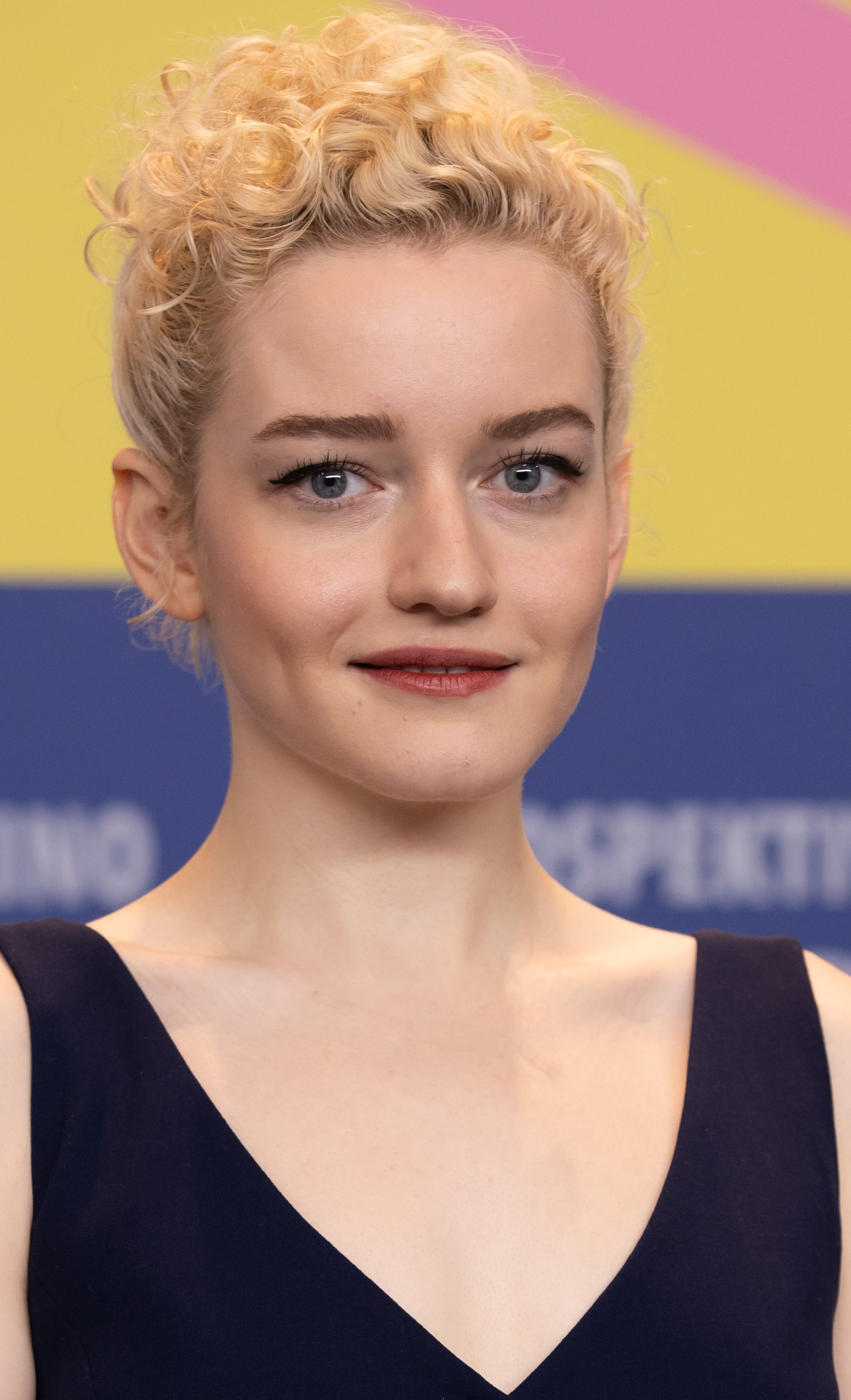
Julia Garner, Outstanding Supporting Actress in a Drama Series winner

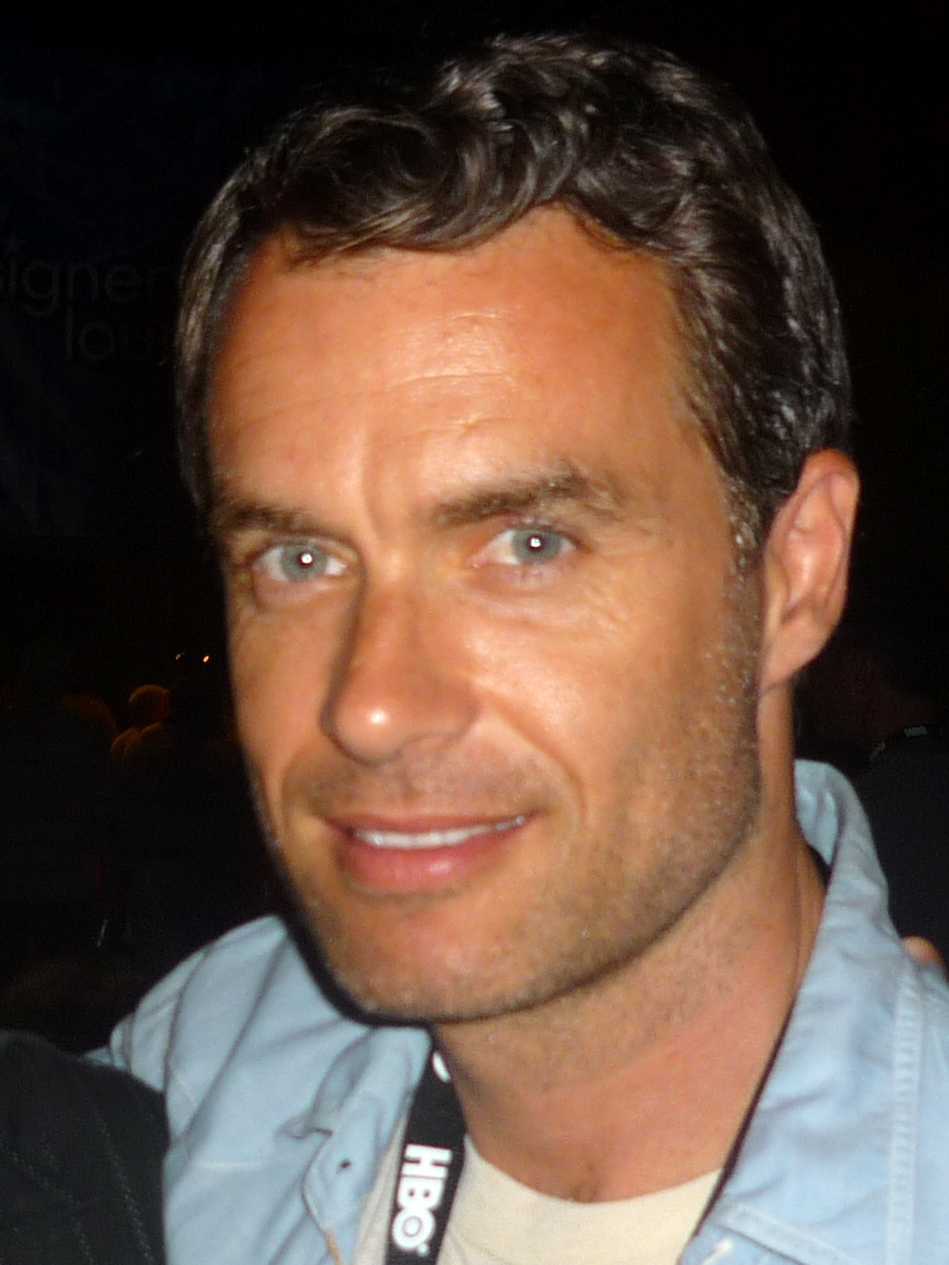
Murray Bartlett, Outstanding Supporting Actor in a Limited or Anthology Series or Movie winner

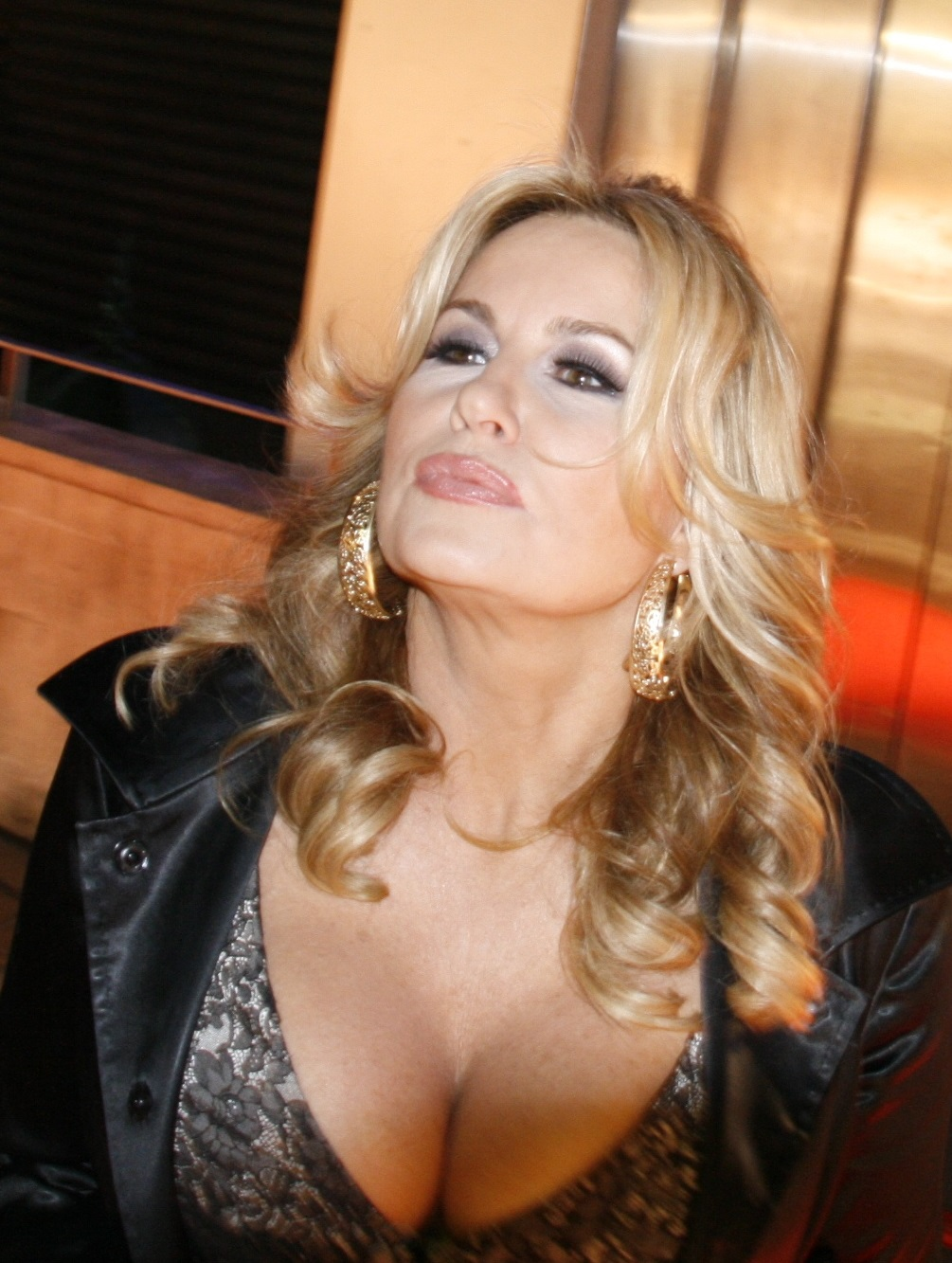
Jennifer Coolidge, Outstanding Supporting Actress in a Limited or Anthology Series or Movie winner

The nominations for the 74th Primetime Emmy Awards were announced on July 12, 2022, by J. B. Smoove and Melissa Fumero alongside Television Academy CEO Frank Scherma. Including nominations at the 74th Primetime Creative Arts Emmy Awards, Succession led all programs with 25 nominations, followed by Ted Lasso and The White Lotus with 20 nominations each. HBO and HBO Max combined for 140 nominations, more than any other network or platform; HBO's 108 nominations surpassed Netflix's second-place tally of 105. Succession earned 14 nominations for acting, surpassing the previous drama series record of 12 set by The West Wing and the overall record of 13 set by Roots and Rich Man, Poor Man. Squid Game became the first non-English-language program to be nominated for Outstanding Drama Series. Quinta Brunson became the first black woman to earn three comedy nominations in a single year for Abbott Elementary. BET, through its streaming service, earned its first major scripted series nomination with The Ms. Pat Show.

The winners were announced on September 12, following the Creative Arts Emmys on September 3 and 4. HBO and HBO Max led all networks and platforms with 38 total wins, reclaiming the top spot after falling behind Netflix the previous year; the latter only won 26 after winning 44 at the previous ceremony. The White Lotus led all programs with five major wins, while Succession and Ted Lasso each won their second overall series awards. The former also led all programs when including Creative Arts Emmys with 10. For their work on Squid Game, Lee Jung-jae and Hwang Dong-hyuk became the first Asians to win for Outstanding Lead Actor in a Drama Series and Outstanding Directing for a Drama Series, respectively. At age 26, for her performance in Euphoria, Zendaya became the youngest two-time winner for acting and the first black woman to win Outstanding Lead Actress in a Drama Series twice. Sheryl Lee Ralph became the second black actress to win Outstanding Supporting Actress in a Comedy Series for her performance in Abbott Elementary, following Jackée Harry's win 35 years earlier. Abbott Elementary creator Brunson also became the second black woman to win Outstanding Writing for a Comedy Series, following Lena Waithe's win for Master of None in 2017.

Winners are listed first, highlighted in boldface, and indicated with a double dagger (‡). (Note: The outlets listed for each program are the U.S. broadcasters or streaming services identified in the nominations, which for some international productions are different than the broadcaster(s) that originally commissioned the program. Programs broadcast by HBO or HBO Max were listed under both services in the nominations list; only the original broadcaster is listed below.) For simplicity, producers who received nominations for program awards have been omitted.

=== Programs ===
Programs
**Outstanding Comedy Series**: **Ted Lasso (Apple TV+)**‡; Abbott Elementary (ABC); Barry (HBO); Curb Your Enthusiasm (HBO); Hacks (HBO Max); The Marvelous Mrs. Maisel (Prime Video); Only Murders in the Building (Hulu); What We Do in the Shadows (FX)	**Outstanding Drama Series**: **Succession (HBO)**‡; Better Call Saul (AMC); Euphoria (HBO); Ozark (Netflix); Severance (Apple TV+); Squid Game (Netflix); Stranger Things (Netflix); Yellowjackets (Showtime)
**Outstanding Limited or Anthology Series**: **The White Lotus (HBO)**‡; Dopesick (Hulu); The Dropout (Hulu); Inventing Anna (Netflix); Pam & Tommy (Hulu)	**Outstanding Competition Program**: **Lizzo's Watch Out for the Big Grrrls (Prime Video)**‡; The Amazing Race (CBS); Nailed It! (Netflix); RuPaul's Drag Race (VH1); Top Chef (Bravo); The Voice (NBC)
**Outstanding Variety Talk Series**: **Last Week Tonight with John Oliver (HBO)**‡; The Daily Show with Trevor Noah (Comedy Central); Jimmy Kimmel Live! (ABC); Late Night with Seth Meyers (NBC); The Late Show with Stephen Colbert (CBS)	**Outstanding Variety Sketch Series**: **Saturday Night Live (NBC)**‡; A Black Lady Sketch Show (HBO)

=== Acting ===
==== Lead performances ====
Lead performances
**Outstanding Lead Actor in a Comedy Series**: **Jason Sudeikis – Ted Lasso as Ted Lasso (Apple TV+)**‡; Donald Glover – Atlanta as Earn (FX); Bill Hader – Barry as Barry Berkman / Barry Block (HBO); Nicholas Hoult – The Great as Peter / Pugachev (Hulu); Steve Martin – Only Murders in the Building as Charles-Haden Savage (Hulu); Martin Short – Only Murders in the Building as Oliver Putnam (Hulu)	**Outstanding Lead Actress in a Comedy Series**: **Jean Smart – Hacks as Deborah Vance (HBO Max)**‡; Rachel Brosnahan – The Marvelous Mrs. Maisel as Miriam "Midge" Maisel (Prime Video); Quinta Brunson – Abbott Elementary as Janine Teagues (ABC); Kaley Cuoco – The Flight Attendant as Cassie Bowden (HBO Max); Elle Fanning – The Great as Catherine the Great (Hulu); Issa Rae – Insecure as Issa (HBO)
**Outstanding Lead Actor in a Drama Series**: **Lee Jung-jae – Squid Game as Seong Gi-hun (Netflix)**‡; Jason Bateman – Ozark as Marty Byrde (Netflix); Brian Cox – Succession as Logan Roy (HBO); Bob Odenkirk – Better Call Saul as Jimmy McGill / Saul Goodman (AMC); Adam Scott – Severance as Mark Scout (Apple TV+); Jeremy Strong – Succession as Kendall Roy (HBO)	**Outstanding Lead Actress in a Drama Series**: **Zendaya – Euphoria as Rue Bennett (HBO)**‡; Jodie Comer – Killing Eve as Villanelle (BBC America); Laura Linney – Ozark as Wendy Byrde (Netflix); Melanie Lynskey – Yellowjackets as Shauna (Showtime); Sandra Oh – Killing Eve as Eve Polastri (BBC America); Reese Witherspoon – The Morning Show as Bradley Jackson (Apple TV+)
**Outstanding Lead Actor in a Limited or Anthology Series or Movie**: **Michael Keaton – Dopesick as Dr. Samuel Finnix (Hulu)**‡; Colin Firth – The Staircase as Michael Peterson (HBO Max); Andrew Garfield – Under the Banner of Heaven as Detective Jeb Pyre (FX on Hulu); Oscar Isaac – Scenes from a Marriage as Jonathan (HBO); Himesh Patel – Station Eleven as Jeevan Chaudhary (HBO Max); Sebastian Stan – Pam & Tommy as Tommy Lee (Hulu)	**Outstanding Lead Actress in a Limited or Anthology Series or Movie**: **Amanda Seyfried – The Dropout as Elizabeth Holmes (Hulu)**‡; Toni Collette – The Staircase as Kathleen Peterson (HBO Max); Julia Garner – Inventing Anna as Anna Delvey (Netflix); Lily James – Pam & Tommy as Pamela Anderson (Hulu); Sarah Paulson – Impeachment: American Crime Story as Linda Tripp (FX); Margaret Qualley – Maid as Alex (Netflix)

==== Supporting performances ====
Supporting performances
**Outstanding Supporting Actor in a Comedy Series**: **Brett Goldstein – Ted Lasso as Roy Kent (Apple TV+)**‡; Anthony Carrigan – Barry as NoHo Hank (HBO); Toheeb Jimoh – Ted Lasso as Sam Obisanya (Apple TV+); Nick Mohammed – Ted Lasso as Nathan Shelley (Apple TV+); Tony Shalhoub – The Marvelous Mrs. Maisel as Abe Weissman (Prime Video); Tyler James Williams – Abbott Elementary as Gregory Eddie (ABC); Henry Winkler – Barry as Gene Cousineau (HBO); Bowen Yang – Saturday Night Live as various characters (NBC)	**Outstanding Supporting Actress in a Comedy Series**: **Sheryl Lee Ralph – Abbott Elementary as Barbara Howard (ABC)**‡; Alex Borstein – The Marvelous Mrs. Maisel as Susie Myerson (Prime Video); Hannah Einbinder – Hacks as Ava Daniels (HBO Max); Janelle James – Abbott Elementary as Ava Coleman (ABC); Kate McKinnon – Saturday Night Live as various characters (NBC); Sarah Niles – Ted Lasso as Dr. Sharon Fieldstone (Apple TV+); Juno Temple – Ted Lasso as Keeley Jones (Apple TV+); Hannah Waddingham – Ted Lasso as Rebecca Welton (Apple TV+)
**Outstanding Supporting Actor in a Drama Series**: **Matthew Macfadyen – Succession as Tom Wambsgans (HBO)**‡; Nicholas Braun – Succession as Greg Hirsch (HBO); Billy Crudup – The Morning Show as Cory Ellison (Apple TV+); Kieran Culkin – Succession as Roman Roy (HBO); O Yeong-su – Squid Game as Oh Il-nam (Netflix); Park Hae-soo – Squid Game as Cho Sang-woo (Netflix); John Turturro – Severance as Irving Bailiff (Apple TV+); Christopher Walken – Severance as Burt Goodman (Apple TV+)	**Outstanding Supporting Actress in a Drama Series**: **Julia Garner – Ozark as Ruth Langmore (Netflix)**‡; Patricia Arquette – Severance as Harmony Cobel (Apple TV+); Jung Ho-yeon – Squid Game as Kang Sae-byeok (Netflix); Christina Ricci – Yellowjackets as Misty (Showtime); Rhea Seehorn – Better Call Saul as Kim Wexler (AMC); J. Smith-Cameron – Succession as Gerri Kellman (HBO); Sarah Snook – Succession as Shiv Roy (HBO); Sydney Sweeney – Euphoria as Cassie Howard (HBO)
**Outstanding Supporting Actor in a Limited or Anthology Series or Movie**: **Murray Bartlett – The White Lotus as Armond (HBO)**‡; Jake Lacy – The White Lotus as Shane Patton (HBO); Will Poulter – Dopesick as Billy Cutler (Hulu); Seth Rogen – Pam & Tommy as Rand Gauthier (Hulu); Peter Sarsgaard – Dopesick as Rick Mountcastle (Hulu); Michael Stuhlbarg – Dopesick as Richard Sackler (Hulu); Steve Zahn – The White Lotus as Mark Mossbacher (HBO)	**Outstanding Supporting Actress in a Limited or Anthology Series or Movie**: **Jennifer Coolidge – The White Lotus as Tanya (HBO)**‡; Connie Britton – The White Lotus as Nicole Mossbacher (HBO); Alexandra Daddario – The White Lotus as Rachel Patton (HBO); Kaitlyn Dever – Dopesick as Betsy Mallum (Hulu); Natasha Rothwell – The White Lotus as Belinda (HBO); Sydney Sweeney – The White Lotus as Olivia Mossbacher (HBO); Mare Winningham – Dopesick as Diane Mallum (Hulu)

=== Directing ===
Directing
**Outstanding Directing for a Comedy Series**: **Ted Lasso: "No Weddings and a Funeral" – MJ Delaney (Apple TV+)**‡; Atlanta: "New Jazz" – Hiro Murai (FX); Barry: "710N" – Bill Hader (HBO); Hacks: "There Will Be Blood" – Lucia Aniello (HBO Max); The Ms. Pat Show: "Baby Daddy Groundhog Day" – Mary Lou Belli (BET+); Only Murders in the Building: "The Boy from 6B" – Cherien Dabis (Hulu); Only Murders in the Building: "True Crime" – Jamie Babbit (Hulu)	**Outstanding Directing for a Drama Series**: **Squid Game: "Red Light, Green Light" – Hwang Dong-hyuk (Netflix)**‡; Ozark: "A Hard Way to Go" – Jason Bateman (Netflix); Severance: "The We We Are" – Ben Stiller (Apple TV+); Succession: "All the Bells Say" – Mark Mylod (HBO); Succession: "The Disruption" – Cathy Yan (HBO); Succession: "Too Much Birthday" – Lorene Scafaria (HBO); Yellowjackets: "Pilot" – Karyn Kusama (Showtime)
**Outstanding Directing for a Limited or Anthology Series or Movie**: **The White Lotus – Mike White (HBO)**‡; Dopesick: "The People vs. Purdue Pharma" – Danny Strong (Hulu); The Dropout: "Green Juice" – Michael Showalter (Hulu); The Dropout: "Iron Sisters" – Francesca Gregorini (Hulu); Maid: "Sky Blue" – John Wells (Netflix); Station Eleven: "Wheel of Fire" – Hiro Murai (HBO Max)

=== Writing ===
Writing
**Outstanding Writing for a Comedy Series**: **Abbott Elementary: "Pilot" – Quinta Brunson (ABC)**‡; Barry: "710N" – Duffy Boudreau (HBO); Barry: "starting now" – Alec Berg and Bill Hader (HBO); Hacks: "The One, the Only" – Lucia Aniello, Paul W. Downs, and Jen Statsky (HBO Max); Only Murders in the Building: "True Crime" – Steve Martin and John Hoffman (Hulu); Ted Lasso: "No Weddings and a Funeral" – Jane Becker (Apple TV+); What We Do in the Shadows: "The Casino" – Sarah Naftalis (FX); What We Do in the Shadows: "The Wellness Center" – Stefani Robinson (FX)	**Outstanding Writing for a Drama Series**: **Succession: "All the Bells Say" – Jesse Armstrong (HBO)**‡; Better Call Saul: "Plan and Execution" – Thomas Schnauz (AMC); Ozark: "A Hard Way to Go" – Chris Mundy (Netflix); Severance: "The We We Are" – Dan Erickson (Apple TV+); Squid Game: "One Lucky Day" – Hwang Dong-hyuk (Netflix); Yellowjackets: "F Sharp" – Jonathan Lisco, Ashley Lyle, and Bart Nickerson (Showtime); Yellowjackets: "Pilot" – Ashley Lyle and Bart Nickerson (Showtime)
**Outstanding Writing for a Limited or Anthology Series or Movie**: **The White Lotus – Mike White (HBO)**‡; Dopesick: "The People vs. Purdue Pharma" – Danny Strong (Hulu); The Dropout: "I'm in a Hurry" – Elizabeth Meriwether (Hulu); Impeachment: American Crime Story: "Man Handled" – Sarah Burgess (FX); Maid: "Snaps" – Molly Smith Metzler (Netflix); Station Eleven: "Unbroken Circle" – Patrick Somerville (HBO Max)	**Outstanding Writing for a Variety Special**: **Jerrod Carmichael: Rothaniel – Jerrod Carmichael (HBO)**‡; Ali Wong: Don Wong – Ali Wong (Netflix); The Daily Show with Trevor Noah Presents: Jordan Klepper Fingers the Globe – Hungary for Democracy – Ian Berger, Devin Delliquanti, Jen Flanz, Jordan Klepper, Zhubin Parang, and Scott Sherman (Comedy Central); Nicole Byer: BBW (Big Beautiful Weirdo) – Nicole Byer (Netflix); Norm Macdonald: Nothing Special – Norm Macdonald (Netflix) (posthumous)

=== Governors Award ===
The Governors Award was presented to the Geena Davis Institute on Gender in Media "in recognition of their efforts to promote gender balance and foster inclusion throughout the entertainment industry".

=== Nominations and wins by program ===
For the purposes of the lists below, "major" constitutes the categories listed above (program, acting, directing, and writing), while "total" includes the categories presented at the Creative Arts Emmy Awards.

Shows with multiple major nominations
Nominations	Show	Network
12	Succession	HBO
11	The White Lotus	HBO
10	Ted Lasso	Apple TV+
9	Dopesick	Hulu
7	Barry	HBO
7	Severance	Apple TV+
7	Squid Game	Netflix
6	Abbott Elementary	ABC
6	Only Murders in the Building	Hulu
6	Ozark	Netflix
6	Yellowjackets	Showtime
5	The Dropout	Hulu
5	Hacks	HBO Max
4	Better Call Saul	AMC
4	The Marvelous Mrs. Maisel	Prime Video
4	Pam & Tommy	Hulu
3	Euphoria	HBO
3	Maid	Netflix
3	Saturday Night Live	NBC
3	Station Eleven	HBO Max
3	What We Do in the Shadows	FX
2	Atlanta	FX
2	The Great	Hulu
2	Impeachment: American Crime Story	FX
2	Inventing Anna	Netflix
2	Killing Eve	BBC America
2	The Morning Show	Apple TV+
2	The Staircase	HBO Max

Shows with five or more total nominations
Nominations	Show	Network
25	Succession	HBO
20	Ted Lasso	Apple TV+
20	The White Lotus	HBO
17	Hacks	HBO Max
17	Only Murders in the Building	Hulu
16	Euphoria	HBO
14	Barry	HBO
14	Dopesick	Hulu
14	Severance	Apple TV+
14	Squid Game	Netflix
13	Ozark	Netflix
13	Stranger Things	Netflix
12	The Marvelous Mrs. Maisel	Prime Video
10	Pam & Tommy	Hulu
9	Saturday Night Live	NBC
8	Moon Knight	Disney+
8	RuPaul's Drag Race	VH1
7	Abbott Elementary	ABC
7	Better Call Saul	AMC
7	Station Eleven	HBO Max
7	What We Do in the Shadows	FX
7	Yellowjackets	Showtime
6	The Dropout	Hulu
6	Lizzo's Watch Out for the Big Grrrls	Prime Video
6	Loki	Disney+
6	Lucy and Desi	Prime Video
6	Queer Eye	Netflix
5	Adele One Night Only	CBS
5	The Beatles: Get Back	Disney+
5	A Black Lady Sketch Show	HBO
5	George Carlin's American Dream	HBO
5	The 64th Annual Grammy Awards	CBS
5	Impeachment: American Crime Story	FX
5	Last Week Tonight with John Oliver	HBO
5	The Late Show with Stephen Colbert	CBS
5	The Pepsi Super Bowl LVI Halftime Show Starring Dr. Dre, Snoop Dogg, Mary J. Blige, Eminem, Kendrick Lamar and 50 Cent	NBC
5	Stanley Tucci: Searching for Italy	CNN
5	The Tinder Swindler	Netflix
5	Top Chef	Bravo

Shows with multiple major wins
Wins	Show	Network
5	The White Lotus	HBO
4	Ted Lasso	Apple TV+
3	Succession	HBO
2	Abbott Elementary	ABC
2	Squid Game	Netflix

Shows with multiple total wins
Wins	Show	Network
10	The White Lotus	HBO
6	Euphoria	HBO
6	Squid Game	Netflix
5	Adele One Night Only	CBS
5	The Beatles: Get Back	Disney+
5	Stranger Things	Netflix
4	Arcane	Netflix
4	Succession	HBO
4	Ted Lasso	Apple TV+
3	Abbott Elementary	ABC
3	Barry	HBO
3	Hacks	HBO Max
3	Last Week Tonight with John Oliver	HBO
3	Lizzo's Watch Out for the Big Grrrls	Prime Video
3	Love on the Spectrum U.S.	Netflix
3	Only Murders in the Building	Hulu
3	The Pepsi Super Bowl LVI Halftime Show Starring Dr. Dre, Snoop Dogg, Mary J. Blige, Eminem, Kendrick Lamar and 50 Cent	NBC
2	A Black Lady Sketch Show	HBO
2	Dopesick	Hulu
2	How I Met Your Father	Hulu
2	Love, Death & Robots	Netflix
2	Lucy and Desi	Prime Video
2	RuPaul's Drag Race	VH1
2	Severance	Apple TV+
2	We're Here	HBO

=== Nominations and wins by network ===
To avoid disputes over how different services combined nominations, the Television Academy did not release its own tally of nominations by network. Totals are based on platforms listed with each nomination.

Networks with multiple major nominations
Nominations	Network
50	HBO / HBO Max
26	Hulu
23	Netflix
19	Apple TV+
8	FX
7	ABC
6	Showtime
5	Prime Video
5	NBC
4	AMC
2	BBC America
2	CBS
2	Comedy Central

Networks with five or more total nominations
Nominations	Network
140	HBO / HBO Max
105	Netflix
58	Hulu
51	Apple TV+
34	Disney+
30	Prime Video
29	CBS
28	NBC
23	ABC
23	FX
17	Showtime
11	Paramount+
10	VH1
8	Bravo
8	YouTube
7	AMC
6	Fox
5	CNN
5	Comedy Central

Networks with multiple major wins
Wins	Network
12	HBO / HBO Max
4	Apple TV+
3	Netflix
2	ABC
2	Hulu

Networks with multiple total wins
Wins	Network
38	HBO / HBO Max
26	Netflix
10	Hulu
9	Apple TV+
9	Disney+
7	Prime Video
6	NBC
5	CBS
3	ABC
3	FX
2	VH1

== Presenters ==
The awards were presented by the following people:

Presenters at the ceremony
Name(s)	Role
Oprah Winfrey	Presented the award for Outstanding Lead Actor in a Limited or Anthology Series or Movie
Jean Smart; Hannah Einbinder	Presented the award for Outstanding Supporting Actor in a Limited or Anthology Series or Movie
Sofía Vergara	Presented the award for Outstanding Supporting Actor in a Drama Series
Kerry Washington; Gael García Bernal	Presented the award for Outstanding Supporting Actress in a Drama Series
Amy Poehler; Seth Meyers	Presented the award for Outstanding Supporting Actress in a Comedy Series
Lizzo	Presented the award for Outstanding Supporting Actor in a Comedy Series
Lee Jung-jae; HoYeon Jung	Presented the award for Outstanding Variety Sketch Series
Selena Gomez; Steve Martin; Martin Short	Presented the award for Outstanding Variety Talk Series
Chandra Wilson; Freddie Highmore	Presented the award for Outstanding Supporting Actress in a Limited or Anthology Series or Movie
Chris O'Donnell; Shemar Moore	Presented the award for Outstanding Lead Actress in a Limited or Anthology Series or Movie
Markella Kavenagh; Ismael Cruz Córdova	Presented the award for Outstanding Competition Program
Sarah Paulson; Shonda Rhimes	Presented the Governors Award to the Geena Davis Institute on Gender in Media
Diego Luna; Rosario Dawson	Presented the award for Outstanding Directing for a Limited or Anthology Series or Movie
Mindy Kaling; B. J. Novak	Presented the award for Outstanding Writing for a Limited or Anthology Series or Movie
Natalie Zea	Presented the award for Outstanding Writing for a Variety Special
Anthony Anderson	Presented the In Memoriam segment
Mariska Hargitay; Christopher Meloni	Presented the award for Outstanding Lead Actor in a Comedy Series
Will Arnett; Jimmy Kimmel	Presented the award for Outstanding Writing for a Comedy Series
Ayo Edebiri; Jeremy Allen White	Presented the award for Outstanding Directing for a Drama Series
Kelly Clarkson	Presented the award for Outstanding Lead Actress in a Drama Series
Regina Hall	Presented the award for Outstanding Lead Actress in a Comedy Series
Molly Shannon; Vanessa Bayer	Presented the award for Outstanding Directing for a Comedy Series
Taron Egerton; Paul Walter Hauser	Presented the award for Outstanding Writing for a Drama Series
Angela Bassett; Ariana DeBose	Presented the award for Outstanding Lead Actor in a Drama Series
Juliette Lewis; RuPaul	Presented the award for Outstanding Limited or Anthology Series
Pete Davidson	Presented the award for Outstanding Comedy Series
Selma Blair	Presented the award for Outstanding Drama Series

== Ceremony information ==
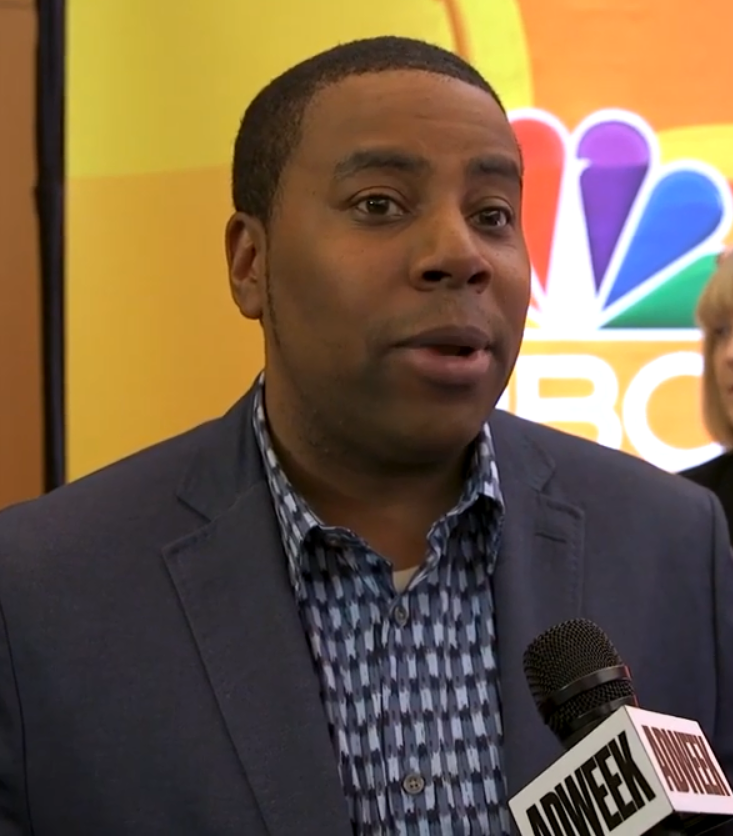
Kenan Thompson served as host for the ceremony

In April 2022, the Academy of Television Arts & Sciences (ATAS, also known as the Television Academy) announced that the 74th Primetime Emmy Awards would be held on September 12; the corresponding Creative Arts ceremonies were announced for September 3 and 4. The main ceremony was shown on NBC as part of a four-year rotation; the ceremony was moved to a Monday to accommodate NBC's Sunday Night Football coverage. The broadcast was also streamed on Peacock. The ceremony was produced by Hudlin Entertainment and Done and Dusted, with Reginald Hudlin, Ian Stewart, Byron Phillips and Jane Mun serving as executive producers. This marked Hudlin's third year and Done and Dusted's fifth year producing the Emmys ceremony. Hamish Hamilton served as director for the fifth time. The ceremony returned to the Microsoft Theater in Downtown Los Angeles, California, after two years at other venues due to the COVID-19 pandemic. According to Television Academy president Maury McIntyre, while an outdoor option similar to the previous year was considered, they wanted to return with an audience and to continue their relationship with the Microsoft Theater.

On August 9, 2022, it was announced that Kenan Thompson, the longest-running cast member on NBC's sketch comedy series Saturday Night Live, would host the ceremony. The producers reportedly approached Chris Rock and Dwayne Johnson to host the ceremony, but had no success. NBC late-night hosts Jimmy Fallon and Seth Meyers – both past Emmys hosts – were also reportedly uninterested in the role. Scherma initially indicated that a hostless ceremony was being considered, but the Television Academy quickly clarified that such an option was not being pursued. Following the announcement, Thompson called the opportunity "ridiculously exciting", even with the relatively short window before the ceremony, adding that he "just want[ed] to celebrate creative people in this business". Alongside Thompson, Zedd and comedian Sam Jay served as the ceremony DJ and announcer, respectively.

Building from the previous year, the ceremony replaced stadium seating for the nominees and their plus-ones with tables. Stewart commented that the format had been well-received before and said, "We've taken that concept and expanded it out." Screens were placed around the tables to create immersion into "different worlds". Other audience members remained in traditional theater seating. In accordance with guild rules, production members, nominees, and guests had to show a negative COVID-19 test before attending. Masking was required for the crew but optional for audience members; most attendees did not wear masks. Regarding changes after the Chris Rock–Will Smith slapping incident at the previous Academy Awards, Scherma expressed confidence in the event's security and staff, while Stewart emphasized the goal of making the event feel inclusive. The ceremony also sought to "celebrate all of TV", in Hudlin's words, by recognizing shows that were not nominated; one way this was done was by inviting actors from those programs as presenters.

=== Emmys realignment ===
In December 2021, ATAS and the National Academy of Television Arts and Sciences (NATAS) announced a major realignment of the Emmy Award ceremonies. This was in response to the growth of streaming television, which blurred the lines in determining which shows should fall under the Daytime or Primetime Emmys. The two ceremonies' scopes were changed to revolve around factors such as the genres, production, and frequency of such programming, rather than strictly dayparts.

Among the major changes that took effect at the 49th Daytime Emmy Awards in June 2022 and at the 74th Primetime Emmy Awards in September 2022:

- Daytime dramas, as defined as "any multi-camera, weekday daily serial, spin-off or reboot", remained at the Daytime Emmys, but most other scripted dramas and comedies had to enter into the Primetime Emmys. For example, the streaming limited series Days of Our Lives: Beyond Salem could still enter into the Daytime Emmys because it is a spin-off of the daytime soap opera Days of Our Lives, but other programs such as The Bay had to move to the Primetime Emmys.
- Talk shows were divided between the Daytime and Primetime Emmys based on "format and style characteristics reflective of current programming in the daytime or late night space". Such programs could petition to switch ceremonies, such as the previous Daytime Emmy winner The Ellen DeGeneres Show, whose format is more similar to the late night talk shows awarded at the Primetime Emmys.
- All children's programming categories were moved to the new Children's and Family Emmy Awards.
- Categories for morning shows were moved from the Daytime Emmys to the News and Documentary Emmy Awards or to the Daytime Emmys' talk show categories, depending on format.

Categories for game shows and instructional programming remained split this year between the Daytime and Primetime Emmys, with their realignment to be determined in 2023.

=== Other rule changes ===
Several other rule changes were implemented for the ceremony. Most notably, programs were no longer categorized as dramas or comedies based on runtime; instead, producers determined where their programs were submitted, with the Television Academy reserving the right to review decisions. The distinction had previously been adjusted in 2015 to consider half-hour programs as comedies and hour-long programs as dramas. The exception to the new rule was that programs under 20 minutes had to be submitted in short-form categories. The Television Academy also revised the description for the Governors Award and clarified that limited series must fully resolve story arcs with "no on-going storyline and/or main characters in subsequent seasons".

In July, the categories for the broadcast were revealed. Outstanding Variety Special (Live) and Outstanding Variety Special (Pre-Recorded) were moved to the Creative Arts ceremonies, while Outstanding Writing for a Variety Special replaced Outstanding Writing for a Variety Series in the main broadcast.

=== Critical reviews and viewership ===
The broadcast generally received mixed to negative reviews from critics. Alan Sepinwall and Rob Sheffield from Rolling Stone each praised the speeches from the winners, particularly Ralph's, while criticizing many of the production elements such as the In Memoriam segment and the frequent play-off music. The Hollywood Reporter's Daniel Fienberg criticized other production decisions, such as the opening number, the dedicated DJ and announcer, and the various montages. He ultimately found the broadcast forgettable, quipping in reference to the Academy Awards six months prior: "But hey, at least it wasn't a catastrophe?" Mike Hale, writing for The New York Times, found the scripted portions weak and remarked that there "seemed to be a consensus, organized or not, to keep it light".

The Boston Globe's Yvonne Abraham complimented Thompson as "a likeable host" and praised several of the speeches and presenters, but she ultimately found the ceremony to be "just another TV awards show... long and stuffed with unnecessary montages and comedy bits". Robert Lloyd of the Los Angeles Times also complimented Thompson despite being "saddled to some dumb bits". However, he criticized the show's pace, calling it fast and "somewhat exhausting", and compared the atmosphere to "watching [a party] through a window". Conversely, Manuel Betancourt was more positive in his review for The A.V. Club, remarking that the program "offered plenty of laughs" and that it "served as a reminder that the boob tube still has the power to inspire wide-eyed girls and boys alike".

Competing with the season premiere of Monday Night Football on ABC and ESPN, the ceremony was viewed by 5.92 million people in the United States, making it the least-viewed in Emmys history, representing a 19% decrease over the previous year's ceremony. It also achieved a 1.09 rating among adults ages 18–49. The ratings figures only include those who watched the telecast on NBC, and not those who streamed it on Peacock.

== In Memoriam ==
The annual In Memoriam segment was presented by Anthony Anderson and featured John Legend debuting his song "Pieces".

- Betty White – performer
- David Warner – performer
- Emilio Delgado – performer
- Peter Scolari – performer
- Yoko Shimada – performer
- Burt Metcalfe – director, writer, producer
- Jay Sandrich – director
- George Yanok – writer
- John Bowman – writer
- Jak Knight – performer, writer
- Dwayne Hickman – performer
- Tony Dow – performer
- Roger E. Mosley – performer
- Howard Hesseman – performer
- Lisa R. Anderson – producer
- Amy Lin Johnson – producer
- Charles Cappleman – executive
- Mercedes Leanza – executive
- Marc Pilcher – makeup artist
- Tony Walton – set designer, costume designer
- Willie Garson – performer
- Robert Morse – performer
- Bernard Shaw – journalist
- Larry Sellers – performer, stunts
- Marilyn Bergman – lyricist
- David A. Arnold – performer, writer
- George Shapiro – manager, producer
- Estelle Harris – performer
- Liz Sheridan – performer
- John Madden – sports commentator
- Vin Scully – sports announcer
- Nichelle Nichols – performer
- Bob Saget – performer
- James Caan – performer
- Gilbert Gottfried – performer
- Cheslie Kryst – performer, attorney
- Dean Stockwell – performer
- Tony Sirico – performer
- Jean-Marc Vallée – director
- Michael Nesmith – performer, producer
- Louie Anderson – performer
- Anne Heche – performer
- Paul Sorvino – performer
- Ray Liotta – performer
- Sidney Poitier – performer, director
