= The Casino (What We Do in the Shadows) =

- What We Do in the Shadows episode
- Episode no.: Season 3 Episode 4
- Directed by: Yana Gorskaya
- Written by: Sarah Naftalis
- Cinematography by: David A. Makin
- Editing by: Yana Gorskaya; Dane McMaster
- Production code: XWS03004
- Original air date: September 16, 2021
- Running time: 25 minutes

Guest appearances
- Anthony Atamanuik as Sean Rinaldi; Gavin Fox as Frank; Marissa Jaret Winokur as Charmaine Rinaldi; Kristen Schaal as The Guide

Episode chronology
← Previous "Gail"	Next → "The Chamber of Judgement"

"The Casino" is the fourth episode of the third season of the American mockumentary comedy horror television series What We Do in the Shadows, set in the franchise of the same name. It is the 24th overall episode of the series and was written by Sarah Naftalis, and directed by co-executive producer Yana Gorskaya. It was released on FX on September 16, 2021.

The series is set in Staten Island, New York City. Like the 2014 film, the series follows the lives of vampires in the city. These consist of three vampires, Nandor, Laszlo, and Nadja. They live alongside Colin Robinson, an energy vampire; and Guillermo, Nandor's familiar. The series explores the absurdity and misfortunes experienced by the vampires. In the episode, the vampires accompany Sean on a trip to Atlantic City, New Jersey.

According to Nielsen Media Research, the episode was seen by an estimated 0.462 million household viewers and gained a 0.13 ratings share among adults aged 18–49. The episode received critical acclaim, with critics praising the humor, writing, and character development. The episode received a nomination for Outstanding Writing for a Comedy Series at the 74th Primetime Emmy Awards.

== Plot ==
For their 20th wedding anniversary, Sean (Anthony Atamanuik) and Charmaine (Marissa Jaret Winokur) have organized a getaway group trip to Atlantic City, New Jersey, inviting the vampires to accompany them. The vampires are forced to take their ancestral soil from their coffins, as they can lose their powers without it, having to place it under their respective beds.

At the casino hotel, Nandor (Kayvan Novak) tells the vampires to stop treating Guillermo (Harvey Guillén) like a familiar, instead integrating him as part of "the family." As Guillermo begins to open up about his family background, the vampires leave to join Sean at the casino. Nadja (Natasia Demetriou), having met with the original Rat Pack, mistakes a group of performers as the original group. Nandor gets obsessed over a The Big Bang Theory slot machine, being forced to leave when Guillermo tells him the sunrise is nearing. However, the vampires are unable to sleep, eventually discovering that their ancestral soil is gone. It is revealed that Colin Robinson (Mark Proksch) was distracted by a casino infomercial, failing to notice the housekeeper vacuuming the soil. Without resting, their powers will slowly fade. Nandor assigns Guillermo to travel to Europe to recover soil from their birthplaces, with Laszlo (Matt Berry) forced to ask Sean for the travel money as his hypnosis does not work. He later feels bad when he realizes the money may caused Sean's financial ruin.

While Guillermo leaves for London, Antipaxos and Southern Iran, the vampires struggle to keep their energy. While using the slot machine, Nandor wonders about the series' title, unaware of the Big Bang. Colin Robinson explains heliocentrism, which disturbs Nandor, as he always believed in the World Turtle theory. This causes Nandor to fall into an existential crisis, questioning his role in the universe. Guillermo returns with the soil, which allows the vampires to recoup their powers. To recover Sean's money, Guillermo uses the vampire for a scheme in which they will hynoptize two boxers during a match. One of the boxers decapitates the other, which allows Colin Robinson to win a substantial amount of money in gambling. Laszlo gives the money to Sean, who thanks him for saving him. As the vampires leave, Sean decides to gamble all the money on a game.

== Production ==
=== Development ===
In August 2021, FX confirmed that the fourth episode of the season would be titled "The Casino", and that it would be written by Sarah Naftalis, and directed by co-executive producer Yana Gorskaya. This was Naftalis' second writing credit, and Gorskaya's fourth directing credit.

=== Writing ===
The episode's writer, Sarah Naftalis, learned about the ancestral soil element in the writers' room, which allowed her to add a comedic element. She said, "It's a funny thing — the reality of the logic that you're being held to is stuff like the ancestral soil."

=== Filming ===
The episode features a slot machine based on the series The Big Bang Theory. The machine was real, with production spending four months in preparing the episode. Two days before filming began, representatives of Warner Bros. Television Studios objected to the use of the series in any way. However, The Big Bang Theory' co-creator, Chuck Lorre, intervened and allowed the series to use it.

== Reception ==
=== Viewers ===
In its original American broadcast, "The Casino" was seen by an estimated 0.462 million household viewers with a 0.13 in the 18-49 demographics. This means that 0.13 percent of all households with televisions watched the episode. This was a 48% increase in viewership from the previous episode, which was watched by 0.311 million household viewers with a 0.11 in the 18-49 demographics.

=== Critical reviews ===
"The Casino" received critical acclaim. Katie Rife of The A.V. Club gave the episode an "A" grade and wrote, "A trip out of the house and away from their duties as heads of the East Coast Vampiric Council (such as they are) did invigorate this week's What We Do In The Shadows, for ensemble comedy that found fresh inspiration in deviating from the larger season-three storyline."

Tony Sokol of Den of Geek gave the episode a 4 star rating out of 5 and wrote, "The vampires are growing in season 3, and the exercise and location shots work wonders for them. It is interesting to watch them interact with humans they call friends, and even go out of their way to do a good deed. The best thing about that is something we only hear in the fade, as Shaun drops the whole bundle on 12. 'The Casino' is a sure bet for What We Do in the Shadows, and kibitzers on the line." Melody McCune of Telltale TV gave the episode a 4.5 star rating out of 5 and wrote, "'The Casino' is the best episode of Season 3 thus far. What We Do in the Shadows continues to push the comedic envelope with clever writing, intricate mythos, A-plus performances, witty comedy, and plenty of heart."

Alejandra Bodden of Bleeding Cool gave the episode an 8.5 out of 10 rating and wrote, "With the twists and turns, it seems it might be harder to make it back than imagined. It was another great episode to add to the season's quality run supported by excellent performances and some truly great writing." Greg Wheeler of Review Geek gave the episode a 4 star out of 5 rating and wrote, "What We Do In The Shadows continues to deliver hearty laughs in this episode, changing the focus to Vegas for a funny chapter that sees all of our vamps out of their comfort zone."

=== Accolades ===
For the episode, Sarah Naftalis was nominated for Outstanding Writing for a Comedy Series at the 74th Primetime Emmy Awards. She lost the award to Abbott Elementary for the episode "Pilot".
