= Starting now =

"starting now"
- Barry episode
- Episode no.: Season 3 Episode 8
- Directed by: Bill Hader
- Written by: Alec Berg & Bill Hader
- Cinematography by: Carl Herse
- Editing by: Ali Greer
- Original air date: June 12, 2022
- Running time: 29 minutes

Guest appearances
- Robert Ray Wisdom as Jim Moss; Michael Irby as Cristobal Sifuentes; Laura San Giacomo as Annie Eisner; Fred Melamed as Tom Posorro; James Hiroyuki Liao as Albert Nguyen; Anthony Molinari as Shane Taylor; Nick Gracer as Yandar; Turhan Troy Caylak as Akhmal; Gary Kraus as Chief Krauss; Phil Reeves as Bob Jacobson; Krizia Bajos as Elena

Episode chronology
← Previous "candy asses"	Next → "yikes"

"starting now" is the eighth episode and season finale of the third season of the American crime tragicomedy television series Barry. It is the 24th overall episode of the series and was written by series creators Alec Berg and Bill Hader, and directed by Hader, who serves as lead actor. It was first broadcast on HBO in the United States on June 12, 2022, and also was available on HBO Max on the same date.

The series follows Barry Berkman, a hitman from Cleveland who travels to Los Angeles to kill someone but finds himself joining an acting class taught by Gene Cousineau, where he meets aspiring actress Sally Reed and begins to question his path in life as he deals with his criminal associates such as Monroe Fuches and NoHo Hank. In the episode, Barry is confronted by his past while Gene is questioned by Jim Moss about Janice's death. Meanwhile, Hank plans his escape from Bolivia.

According to Nielsen Media Research, the episode was seen by an estimated 0.221 million household viewers and gained a 0.04 ratings share among adults aged 18–49. The episode received universal acclaim from critics, who praised its writing, directing, performances (particularly Carrigan, Goldberg, Hader, Liao, Root, Wisdom, and Winkler), lack of humor, sound mixing, horror elements, and set-up for the next season. At the 74th Primetime Emmy Awards, the episode received a nomination for Outstanding Writing for a Comedy Series. Additionally, Bill Hader and Henry Winkler submitted the episode to support their nominations for Outstanding Lead Actor in a Comedy Series and Outstanding Supporting Actor in a Comedy Series, respectively.

== Plot ==
Barry (Bill Hader) hallucinates himself on a beach populated by people he killed, seeing Gene (Henry Winkler) and Sally (Sarah Goldberg) among them before waking up in the hospital. He goes back to his apartment, where he finds Sally, who asks him to spook Natalie the way he suggested previously with the BanShe executive. (Note: As depicted in "crazytimesh*tshow".)

Dunn (Sarah Burns) questions Fuches (Stephen Root), claiming the Chechen pin found on Janice's body belongs to him and they linked him to Goran Pazar's murder. Fuches is then sent to prison, where he now claims to be "The Raven", although Dunn remains suspicious about him and what he said to Albert (James Hiroyuki Liao). Jim (Robert Ray Wisdom) makes Gene come to his house and drives him to tears interrogating him about Janice and Barry. At the apartment, Barry tries to dissuade Sally, but they are interrupted by the surviving member from Taylor's gang (Anthony Molinari), who knocks Barry unconscious before attempting to strangle Sally. Sally manages to stab him and then kill him with a baseball bat. Witnessing this upon waking up, Barry pulls her away and tells a traumatized Sally he will take responsibility and tells her to leave.

In Bolivia, a captured Hank (Anthony Carrigan) listens in horror as the Bolivians unleash a panther on Akhmal (Troy Caylak) and Yandar (Nick Gracer) in the neighboring cell, killing them. As the panther starts tearing apart his cell wall, Hank escapes from his handcuffs, fights a henchman for his rifle, and kills the panther. Finding his way to a luxury house, he discovers Elena (Krizia Bajos) subjecting Cristobal (Michael Irby) to electroshock conversion therapy using a male dancer. Hank kills Elena and the dancer and embraces Cristobal, though he remains visibly traumatized.

Barry takes the attacker's corpse and buries it in the outskirts of Los Angeles, only to be confronted by Albert. Holding him at gunpoint, Albert berates him over Chris' death and the murders he has committed. Albert then chooses to forgive Barry, telling him that he has a daughter now who would not be alive if Barry had not saved him in Korangal Valley. However, he tells Barry that he needs to stop being a hitman "starting now" (Note: The same phrase that Barry tells himself several times in the first season when he tries to quit contract killing.) and leaves Barry sobbing.

That night, Barry calls Sally, telling her everything will be fine and makes plans to leave town together. Unbeknownst to Barry, Sally has boarded a plane back to her hometown, Joplin, Missouri. He then receives a call from Jim, who wants to meet immediately with him. Barry hangs up and calls Gene, who cryptically states that Jim is trying to ruin their lives and that they need to stop him. Barry arrives and takes the handgun from Gene, telling him to go home, despite Gene telling him not to go in the house as Jim knows Barry killed Janice. Barry enters the house and aims the gun at Jim, only to be ambushed by a police squad led by Dunn. Seeing Gene staring at him, Barry realizes he was tricked. As Barry is taken away, Gene and Jim share a moment of bittersweet relief.

== Production ==
=== Development ===
In April 2022, the episode's title was revealed as "starting now" and it was announced that series creators Alec Berg and Bill Hader had written the episode while Hader had directed it. This was Berg's ninth writing credit, Hader's ninth writing credit, and Hader's tenth directing credit.

=== Writing ===
Bill Hader claimed that some people familiar with him expressed anxiety during the episode, a feeling he shared, deeming it "a tough watch". Hader questioned if it the content was any bleaker than the real-life news, saying, "Living in the pandemic and where the world's at and mass shootings and all these things — it's all in there emotionally."

According to Hader, Gene and Sally appearing in the beach scene was a representation of the two things that Barry cares about the most, saying that it was "kind of like a fever dream of he's afraid of something happening to the two people he cares about the most." Originally, the scene would start with Sally laying across a rock, staring at the camera and with eyes glowing. The scene was scrapped when the series Midnight Mass did a similar scene. The shot of Barry looking back in shock was leftover coverage from the filming of the previous episode: in its original context, Barry was noticing Mayrbek.

Hader explained Albert's actions in the episode, "it was always a feeling that Albert was the only one who could really forgive Barry. He could give him back his humanity, that Albert is going to be turned like all these other characters we've seen throughout the season, that he was going to resort to violence because he loves somebody. And then he gets there and sees Barry cowering and you realize Barry isn't Jason Bourne or some mastermind. He's basically just a scared boy, and Albert's looking at a soldier. He's looking at someone with trauma."

Gene catching Barry was planned since the first day the writers started working on the third season. Hader felt that audiences expected Barry to not get caught until the final episode of the series, so he decided to do it earlier. He also explained Gene's actions, "I think by the end of this season, Cousineau has done what he's wanted to do, which is get justice for Janice. And by doing that he has gotten true forgiveness. The stuff he was doing beforehand with Laura San Giacomo's character, giving her all these things, that's making himself feel good. He's doing those things, but really doing it so you can feel good about himself. And he doesn't really care if that woman gets her play on or whatever. He just feels guilty. But by turning Barry in and risking his life and doing what was right, he has achieved real forgiveness." Hader said of the final scene, "it's just [Jim Moss] alone with the memory of his daughter — and he doesn't want to go inside that house. Because it's empty, and the reason its empty is because of Barry. And it just felt like the right kind of note to end the season on, because it was so much about trauma and victims of violence: Barry's, and other people's violence."

=== Filming ===
The scene where Sally kills the Taylor gang member caused some discomfort among the crew. Hader wanted the scene to feel believable while avoiding becoming an action sequence, explaining "what you're watching is trauma. You're watching someone with trauma act out and try to take control." He further added about Barry taking responsibility, "It's about trying to take the blame for it. It's what he's been trying to do all season, get some sense of forgiveness."

Production on Season 3 was due to begin in March 2020, with the entire season fully scripted and the cast having gathered for table reads before the COVID-19 pandemic forced a shutdown. During the subsequent break the writers began work on Season 4, which led to some changes in Season 3. Hader highlights the sequences where NoHo Hank and Sally are forced to kill people as story threads that were retroactively added for exploration in the fourth season: namely, that the two characters have caught Barry's "disease" of murdering people. One scene that remained the same from script to production was the interrogation scene, with Hader wanting to emphasize limited camera movement. Writer Duffy Boudreau referred to the scene as "Gene facing God", which took seven takes, although they ended up using the sixth take in the final cut. Winkler cried during the scene, with Hader saying "It's weird for me to say it was sweet, but it was sweet."

Hader explained the decision to not show the panther in the episode, "it's this idea of turning into a vengeful, violent thing, and then by not showing it, it was like this ethereal thing that he's reacting to. But then on just another horror movie thing, the less you show, the more you hear and the better it is." Anthony Carrigan commented on the lack of comedy during the sequence: "it's pure survival from that point on, which is why it was very intentional that there were no gags, there were no bits. This wasn't supposed to be funny, and this wasn't supposed to be an action sequence, in terms of him getting out. It wasn't supposed to be cool whatsoever. It was messy, it was clumsy, and it was terrifying."

== Reception ==
=== Ratings ===
The episode was watched by 0.221 million viewers, earning a 0.04 in the 18-49 rating demographics on the Nielson ratings scale. This means that 0.04 percent of all households with televisions watched the episode. This was a slight decrease from the previous episode, which was watched by 0.261 million viewers with a 0.05 in the 18-49 demographics.

=== Critical reception ===
"starting now" received universal acclaim from critics. David Cote of The A.V. Club gave the episode an "A" and wrote, "In interviews, Hader warned episode eight was going to be intense with few laughs, and that's about right. It was a meat grinder, a nail gun to the heart—insert your favorite destructive appliance. Barry started this season trying to earn forgiveness, but what he got was justice. He's going to prison. It's better than hell. For the time being, at least."

Alan Sepinwall of Rolling Stone wrote, "After the extraordinary season Barry just completed, though, I have learned to stop betting against Bill Hader. Season Two was, again, almost oppressively dark at times, yet Season Three managed to bring back the humor without undercutting the thematic or emotional points. And if Barry's arrest really is the end of wacky Chechen mob hijinks, Sally obsessing over Rotten Tomatoes scores, Fuches falling in love in exile, etc., then maybe that's OK, too. Hader, Winkler, Goldberg, and everyone else have long since proved their dramatic bona fides, and Barry would be far from the first crime-adjacent show to gradually shift from a light-dark balance to something entirely focused on the latter. Somehow, Breaking Bad got from Jesse Pinkman's, “Yeah, SCIENCE!” to him wailing about how Mr. White can't keep getting away with this, you know? What a season. What a finale. How in the world can Barry continue after this? I can't wait to see them attempt it."

Ben Rosenstock of Vulture gave the episode a perfect 5 star rating out of 5 and wrote, "That's just another example of this show's versatility. Season three was Barry's best yet, a thoughtfully told story about different people searching for forgiveness and rarely finding it. At every point, these eight episodes spotlight the webs of collateral damage that branch out from every act of violence, whether a shot to the head, a slap to the face, or a belittling scream. Sometimes redemption is within reach, but sometimes remorse, whether in the form of a verbal apology or a generous donation, isn't enough. Sometimes consequences, whether that means incarceration or something as permanent as death, aren't enough either." Nick Harley of Den of Geek wrote, "We know Barry will be back for Season 4, so it's thrilling that they made the decision for Barry to be caught. It will be interesting to see if the next season will focus on some sort of trial or if it will follow Barry in prison. There are also logical endpoints for most of the supporting characters, so it's possible that people like Sally and Hank may not appear next season. Regardless, this finale packs so much action, emotion, and surprises in 29 minutes. It's a real tour de force and cements Bill Hader as one of television's most towering talents."

=== Accolades ===
Bill Hader and Henry Winkler submitted the episode to support their nominations for Outstanding Lead Actor in a Comedy Series and Outstanding Supporting Actor in a Comedy Series at the 74th Primetime Emmy Awards.

Year	Award	Category	Nominee(s)	Result	Ref.
2022
2022	Hollywood Critics Association TV Awards	Best Writing in a Broadcast Network or Cable Series, Comedy	Alec Berg and Bill Hader	Nominated	
2022	Primetime Emmy Awards				
2022	Primetime Emmy Awards	Outstanding Lead Actor in a Comedy Series	Bill Hader	Nominated	
2022	Primetime Emmy Awards	Outstanding Supporting Actor in a Comedy Series	Henry Winkler	Nominated	
2022	Primetime Emmy Awards	Outstanding Writing for a Comedy Series	Alec Berg and Bill Hader	Nominated	
2022	Primetime Creative Arts Emmy Awards	Outstanding Cinematography for a Single-Camera Series (Half-Hour)	Carl Herse	Nominated	
2022	Primetime Creative Arts Emmy Awards	Outstanding Single-Camera Picture Editing for a Comedy Series	Ali Greer	Won	
2022	Primetime Creative Arts Emmy Awards	Outstanding Sound Editing for a Comedy or Drama Series (Half-Hour) and Animation	Sean Heissinger, Matthew E. Taylor, John Creed, Rickley W. Dumm, Clay Weber, Darrin Mann, Michael Brake, Alyson Dee Moore and Chris Moriana	Won	
