= Jessy Hodges =

American actress

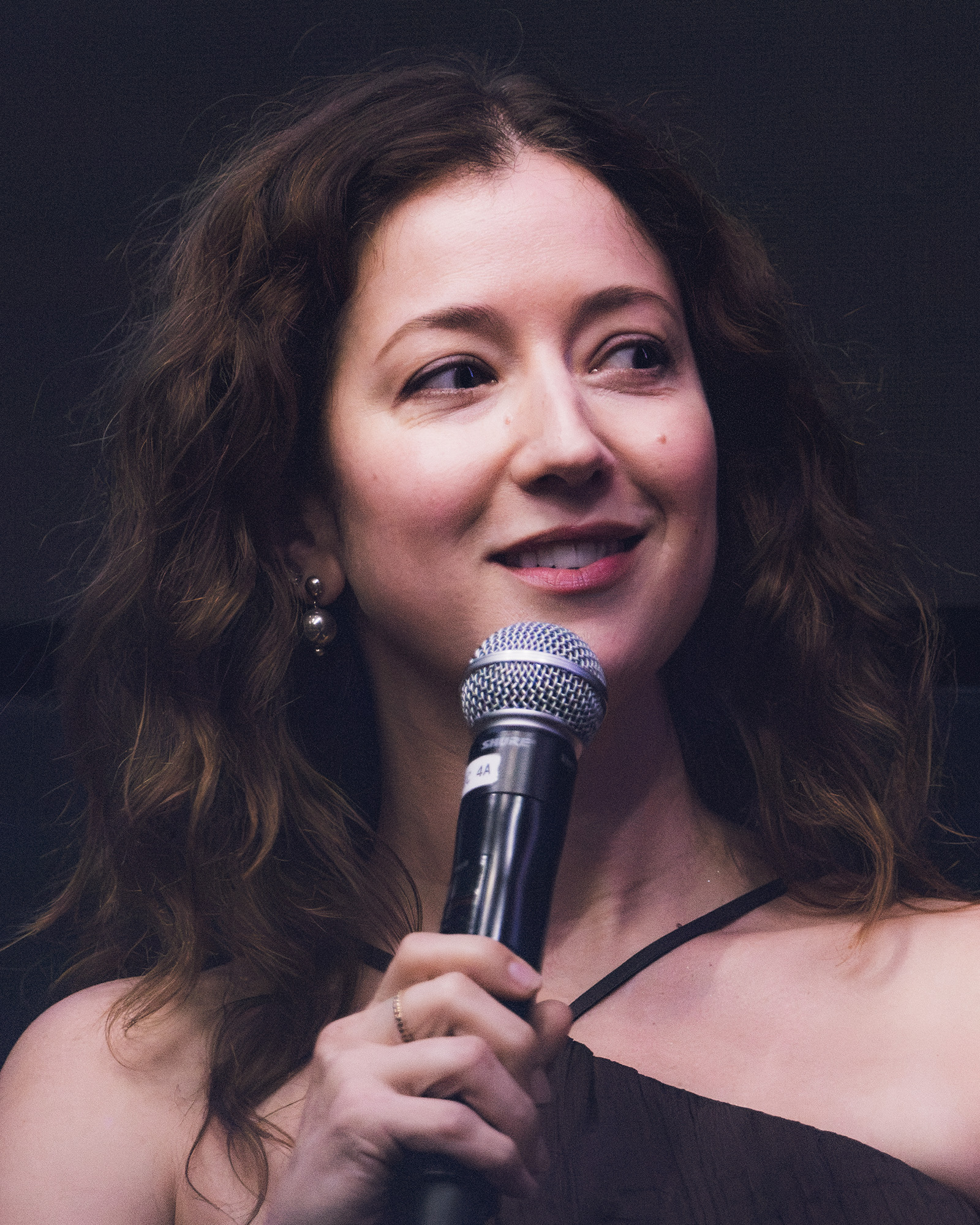
- Hodges in 2026
- Education: New York University
- Occupation: Actress
- Years active: 2005–present
- Spouse: Beck Bennett (m. 2018)
- Children: 1
- Mother: Ellen Sandweiss

Jessy Hodges is an American actress. She is known for starring as Joanna in the NBC sitcom Indebted and Melanie in the VH1 drama Hindsight. From 2019 to 2023, she appeared as Lindsay in the HBO dark comedy series Barry.

== Early life ==
Hodges is originally from Huntington Woods, Michigan and is the daughter of actress Ellen Sandweiss. She studied drama at New York University's Tisch School of the Arts.

== Career ==
From 2008 to 2012, Hodges starred as Sophie Parker in the web series Anyone But Me. In 2013, she featured in Chris Lowell's directorial debut Beside Still Waters.

Hodges has appeared on various television series, including It's Always Sunny in Philadelphia and The Goldbergs. From 2019 to 2022, she portrayed talent agent Lindsay Mandel on Barry. In 2020, she starred as Joanna Klein on Indebted.

== Personal life ==
Hodges married comedian Beck Bennett on August 25, 2018. Together they have one son and live in Los Angeles, California.

== Filmography ==
=== Film ===
Year	Title	Role	Notes
2006	Satan's Playground	Lost Teen	
2009	Road of Darkness	Sara	Short film
2013	Beside Still Waters	Charley	
2014	The Sound and the Shadow	Story	
2016	How to Lose Weight in 4 Easy Steps	Melissa	Short film
2017	Tilt	Kendra	
2018	Games for Girls	Jay	Short film
2018	Let's Change the Dialogue on Breastfeeding		Short film
2019	Sundowners	Ali	Short film
2019	Plus One	Amanda	
2019	Shady Friend	HS Student 1	Short film

=== Television ===
Year	Title	Role	Notes
2008–2012	Anyone But Me	Sophie Parker	Main role; 24 episodes
2011	Greek	Lasker's Assistant/Hillary	Episode: "Legacy"
2012	Grey's Anatomy	Donna	Episode: "I Was Made for Lovin' You"
2013	True Blood	Mustard	Recurring role; 2 episodes
2014	Enlisted	Erin	Recurring role; 5 episodes
2015	Hindsight	Melanie Morelli	Main role; 10 episodes
2016	Mike & Molly	Maura	Episode: "Baby Bump"
2016	Crunch Time	Hannah	Main role; 6 episodes
2017	The Last Tycoon	Molly	Episode: "A More Perfect Union"
2017	You're the Worst	Female Jogger	Episode: "Like People"
2017	Graves	Farrah	Recurring role; 5 episodes
2018	Here and Now	Courtney	Episode: "Wake"
2018	Girlfriends' Guide to Divorce	Natalie	Recurring role; 2 episodes
2019–2023	Barry	Lindsay Mandel	Recurring role; 13 episodes
2019	PEN15	Ms. Bennett	Episode: "Solo"
2019	It's Always Sunny in Philadelphia	Moderator	Episode: "Thunder Gun 4: Maximum Cool"
2020	Indebted	Joanna	Main role; 12 episodes
2021	The Big Leap	Paige	3 episodes
2022	The Goldbergs	Claire Bee	Episode: "One Exquisite Evening with Madonna"
2023	How I Met Your Father	Dana	Episode: "The Welcome Protocol"
2026	Maximum Pleasure Guaranteed	Mallory	Main role

== Selected theatre ==
- The Metal Children at the Vineyard Theatre
- The Great Recession at the Flea Theater
- Misery and Good Fortune at HERE Arts
- A workshop of Gilgamesh's Game with New Georges
