= The wizard (Barry) =

"the wizard"
- Barry episode
- Episode no.: Season 4 Episode 6
- Directed by: Bill Hader
- Written by: Duffy Boudreau
- Cinematography by: Carl Herse
- Editing by: Franky Guttman
- Original air date: May 14, 2023
- Running time: 31 minutes

Guest appearances
- Fred Melamed as Tom Posorro; Charles Parnell as DA Buckner; Andrew Leeds as Leo Cousineau; Bill Burr as Pastor Nick (voice); Tobie Windham as "Groove Tube" Damian; Andre Hyland as "Live Wire" Jason; Annie Chang as Studio PA; James Austin Johnson as Pastor #2 (voice); Spenser Granese as Bevel; Anthony Molinari as Shane Taylor; Zachary Golinger as John; Charlie Korman as Gordon Cousineau; Carrie Gibson as Tall Barista; Autumn Palen as Barista's Daughter

Episode chronology
← Previous "tricky legacies"	Next → "a nice meal"

"the wizard" is the sixth episode of the fourth season of the American crime tragicomedy television series Barry. It is the 30th overall episode of the series and was written by co-executive producer Duffy Boudreau and directed by series co-creator Bill Hader, who also serves as lead actor. It was first broadcast on HBO in the United States on May 14, 2023, and also was available on HBO Max on the same date.

The series follows Barry Berkman, a hitman from Cleveland who travels to Los Angeles to kill someone but finds himself joining an acting class taught by Gene Cousineau, where he meets aspiring actress Sally Reed and begins to question his path in life as he deals with his criminal associates such as Monroe Fuches and NoHo Hank. The previous seasons saw Barry try to decide between both lives, which culminated in his arrest. In the episode, Barry, after escaping prison and living on the run with Sally and their son John for eight years, returns to Los Angeles to kill Gene and prevent the story of their relationship from being adapted into a film, unaware that Gene wants to kill the movie himself. Sally has a bad experience at home, while Fuches is released from prison and forges an alliance with Hank, hoping to get his help in killing Barry.

According to Nielsen Media Research, the episode was seen by an estimated 0.232 million household viewers and gained a 0.05 ratings share among adults aged 18–49. The episode received positive reviews from critics, who praised Hader's directing, performances, character development, sound mixing and suspense.

== Plot ==
Before leaving for Los Angeles, Barry (Bill Hader) has Sally (Sarah Goldberg) learn how to use a gun to protect John (Zachary Golinger). Sally discourages his plan to kill Gene (Henry Winkler), but Barry states it is their only plan to maintain their current status, as he does not want Gene to tell his perspective of the story.

A hardened and heavily tattooed Fuches (Stephen Root), now going by "The Raven", (Note: Based on a fake name Hank gave him in "forgiving jeff".) is released from prison and picked up by his gang. After quickly charming a barista (Carrie Gibson) into an apparent marriage, he meets with Hank (Anthony Carrigan) at his latest front for the Chechen mob: "Nohobal", a successful company specializing in sand importation, with a bronze statue of Cristobal in the lobby. In exchange for his silence regarding Hank's criminal activities, Fuches wants an expensive house and information on Barry's whereabouts. Hank believes Barry is probably dead, but after pressure from Fuches, he agrees and gives Fuches's gang jobs as Nohobal security. On his trip to Los Angeles, Barry buys a gun and listens to megachurch podcasts until he finds one that he believes justifies killing.

Gene and Tom (Fred Melamed) meet to discuss Barry's biopic with the Warner Bros. executive. Gene claims that his time spent at a kibbutz in Israel made him change his perception of life, and deems their attempt at a biopic as exploitation. The studio states they will proceed with the biopic with or without him, just as an officer takes Gene to meet with District Attorney Buckner (Charles Parnell). Buckner reprimands Gene for fleeing after shooting and injuring his son Leo. (Note: As depicted in "it takes a psycho".)

Gene visits Leo (Andrew Leeds) at his house, apologizing for shooting him and explaining his plan to stall the biopic, although Leo does not believe him. Barry stakes out the house and prepares to enter, but stops himself when he sees Gene's grandson Gordon (Charlie Korman), now a teenager, arrive home from school. Back at their house, John refuses to eat anything, so Sally gives him alcohol, causing him to sleep on the couch. While taking a nap, she overhears Bevel yelling outside the house threatening her and John, then seemingly hallucinates someone breaking into the house and threatening them, (Note: The voice belongs to the biker whom she killed in "starting now".) even shaking the whole house with his truck. Sally goes to the living room, finding wreckage strewn all over. That night, she calls Barry, urging him to come back, while John listens in secret.

At the luxury house, a drunken Fuches delivers a toast to Hank for his actions and success but claims Hank killed Cristobal and that he stole Cristobal's business idea. When Fuches doubles down on the claim and deems it a compliment, an incensed Hank orders him and his gang to leave the house by next morning. As Barry approaches Gene's house, he is kidnapped and wakes up tied to a chair facing Jim Moss (Robert Wisdom).

== Production ==
=== Development ===
In April 2023, the episode's title was revealed as "the wizard" and it was announced that co-executive producer Duffy Boudreau had written the episode, while series creator and lead actor Bill Hader directed it. This was Boudreau's fourth writing credit, and Hader's sixteenth directing credit.

=== Writing ===
Commenting on Barry's intention to kill Gene, Bill Hader explained that Barry is primarily stopping Gene from telling "his truth", therefore Barry must kill him. He said, "Barry doesn't want that out there, and now that he has this kid who sees him as the perfect version of himself, he just wants John to think of him as this hero and this great guy. If that comes out, that's bad."

Fuches' story and transformation into "The Raven" was conceived since the third season, with Hader suggesting turning the name from becoming a laughingstock into a real criminal mind. The 8-year time jump helped with the transition, with Hader also explaining, "He's had eight years to stew about Barry because Barry sold him out, and now he's just a different guy. It's a question of does he still love him or not? It seems like he doesn't. His whole thing is Barry alone in a room with my guys." Actor Stephen Root added, "He is now a powerful person within that space, which he wasn't before; he was being reviled and made fun of. So now that he has that power I think in the intervening years he got more and more confident. He put more and more tattoos on; he became grounded and centered and OK with being a killer."

Gene was originally expected to cover half of the story in "tricky legacies", which would cover his time at a kibbutz in Israel and it would end with him discovering that there was a biopic in the works. Hader felt that it hurt the story, so he changed it to a new version where there were no plans to film the biopic, but Gene's attempts to shut it down prompt the studio to go forward. One of the writers, Emma Barrie, disagreed with Hader's idea, as she felt it did not make sense from a character point of view. Hader slightly altered the plan, which by itself required reshoots.

Sally's storyline was originally different. Initially, Sally would check on the computer, finding that Barry's biopic announcement overshadowed Natalie's series finale. Sally and John then would fly to Los Angeles and visit the Warner Bros. studio, where she would also meet Natalie and Jennifer Lawrence, the actress interested in playing her. The events of her storyline would prove to be a daydream. Hader discarded it, as he felt it was very reminiscent of Gene's journey. He decided to alter the storyline, settling on "What if it's like this? Like a manifestation of her guilt", which convinced the crew. The costume design for the imaginary assailant was based on Todd Haynes' film, Safe, with Hader suggesting that the costume be all in black.

=== Casting ===
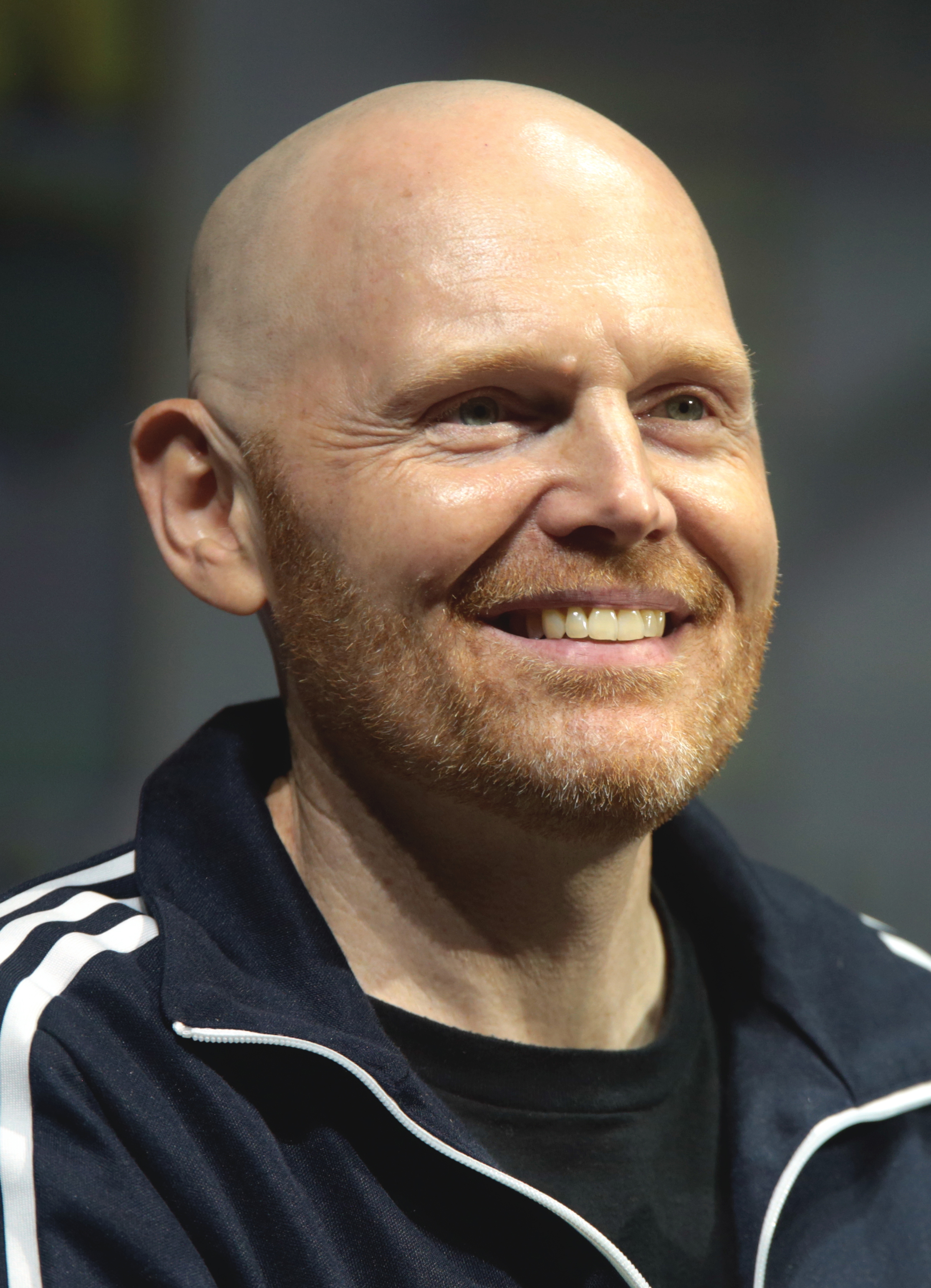
Bill Burr guest stars in a voice cameo.

Bill Burr makes an appearance in the episode, providing the voice for Pastor Nick, a podcaster to whom Barry listens in the episode. The idea behind the podcasts was not planned originally, but the writers decided to add it as a gag, given that the scenes wouldn't look interesting by themselves. Hader settled on the podcasts as Barry was committed to the idea of sin, explaining, "He's not that bright, but he can find something that validates his feelings. It's the same thing as looking up the baseball stuff."

=== Filming ===
The scene where the truck hits the house was filmed months in advance. To achieve the effect, the crew lifted a wall, put a giant tear in the middle and then shot the truck backing up. Sarah Goldberg mentioned an unused shot from the episode that focused on Sally exiting the bedroom after the truck demolished the wall, only to show that the wall was smooth. Goldberg mentioned the deleted shot gave credence the theory that the intruder was a hallucination and a manifestation of Sally's guilt. Another scene cut from the episode featured Sally returning to the diner at the end where she forgets to speak in her Southern accent, and then halfway through speaking she slowly brings it back. She then says Bevel did this, to which her colleague responds "Oh, Bevel left town a couple days ago."

As the meeting between Gene and Tom with the studio executive required reshoots, it was the last scene filmed for the series.

=== Music ===
The song "The Wizard" by Black Sabbath is used for Fuches' release from prison, and is also used as the title of the episode. Hader listened to the song while driving to the set during the third season filming, from which he got the idea to use it.

== Reception ==
=== Ratings ===
The episode was watched by 0.232 million viewers, earning a 0.05 in the 18-49 rating demographics on the Nielson ratings scale. This means that 0.05 percent of all households with televisions watched the episode. This was a slight decrease from the previous episode, which was watched by 0.279 million viewers with a 0.07 in the 18-49 demographics.

=== Critical reception ===
"the wizard" received positive reviews from critics. On the review aggregator Rotten Tomatoes, it holds an approval rating of 100% based on 8 reviews, with an average rating of 7.7/10. Matt Schimkowitz of The A.V. Club gave the episode a "B" and wrote, "Though it feels less revolutionary than last week's descent into the sickly underbelly of Barry's nightmares, this week doesn't lack innovation. Trading the slow fades for abrupt cuts, the show threads its frayed strands into a single fuse and lights it. At its best, 'the wizard' bends time, making Sally's solo-parenting adventure one of the series' most harrowing set pieces. Other times, though, 'the wizard' can feel like a setup for next week. To that end, it's surprising the episode ends with Barry in Moss' garage instead of cutting to black after getting bagged outside Cousineau's. But 'the wizard,' as the song says, 'just kept walking,' leaving us with a big unresolved knot in our stomachs."

Alan Sepinwall of Rolling Stone praised the episode but expressed confusion at Sally's sequence, writing, "The first time I watched it months ago, I assumed it was missing a lot of VFX and other technical polish to clarify what we were seeing and hearing, but I watched the final version earlier this week, and it's basically the same. Just an odd, odd choice in an episode otherwise firing on all cylinders. And yet even within that, Sarah Goldberg continues to be magnificent." Ben Rosenstock of Vulture gave the episode a 4 star rating out of 5 and wrote, "One of the most bone-chilling sequences in the entire run of Barry begins 20 minutes through tonight's episode: an attack on Barry and Sally's remote home that leaves the latter calling her husband in a panic, pleading with him to come home. It's terrifying in a number of ways, starting from the circumstances. John is asleep and vulnerable on the couch, with the door and windows accessible to intruders. When Sally hears faint yelling about coming for her and her son and slowly steps into the living room, we're primed for action."

Steve Greene of IndieWire gave the episode a "B+" and wrote, "Regardless of the outcome, that last wordless coda to 'The Wizard' is another example that Barry understands the power of silence, from ditching its theme song to the eerie quiet at the home where Sally, Barry, and John have holed up. When everyone stops talking, it's easier to hear the consequences." Josh Spiegel of /Film wrote, "'The wizard' does spend some of its runtime establishing the new normal for the other remaining characters, as we saw so little of anyone aside from Barry and Sally last week, but it does so in a way that suggests a final sense of propulsion. There are now only two episodes left, and only so many more ways in which these characters can survive or kill each other, and the ratcheting tension is... kind of getting unbearable! That's not automatically a criticism, but at the same time, there are only so many more corners Barry and the others can find themselves stuck within."
