= Golda Och Academy =

Jewish day school in Essex County, New Jersey, United States

Location
- 1418 Pleasant Valley Way; West Orange, Essex County, New Jersey 07052; United States
- 40°46′28″N 74°16′53″W

Information
- Type: Private
- Religious affiliation: Jewish
- Established: September 1965 as Solomon Schechter Day School Of Essex And Union, January 2011 as Golda Och Academy
- NCES School ID: A0502343
- Principal: Paul-Michael Huseman (Upper School); Heather Brown (Lower School)
- Head of School: Carrie Zucker Siegel
- Faculty: 75.9 FTEs
- Grades: Pre-K–12
- Enrollment: 424 (plus 21 in PreK, as of 2023–24)
- Student to teacher ratio: 5.6:1
- Campus: Suburban
- Colors: Blue; White; Gold
- Athletics conference: Super Essex Conference
- Team name: Road Runners
- Tuition: $39,995 (9–11 for 2025–26)
- Website: www.goldaochacademy.org

Golda Och Academy is a private Jewish day school in West Orange, New Jersey. It educates Jewish students from pre-kindergarten through twelfth grade at two campuses. Previously known as Solomon Schechter Day School of Essex and Union, the current name was adopted in June 2011. It primarily serves families from Essex and Union counties, while also drawing students from other parts of North and Central Jersey, along with New York.

As of the 2023–24 school year, the school had an enrollment of 424 students (plus 21 in PreK) and 75.9 classroom teachers (on an FTE basis), for a student–teacher ratio of 5.6:1.

On July 1, 2021, Daniel S. Nevins became the 8th Head of School, succeeding Adam Shapiro. On the same date, Eytan Apter began serving as the Upper School Principal and Carrie Zucker Siegel became the Lower School Principal.

On July 1, 2025, Carrie Zucker Siegel was named Head of School.

== History ==
Solomon Schechter Day School of Essex and Union opened in September 1965 at Congregation Beth Shalom in Union Township, Union County, New Jersey, founded by Rabbi Elvin I. Kose, Horace Bier, and Nat Winter. Its inaugural classes included kindergarten and a first grade with 18 students. A new grade was added each year for the initial cohort, culminating in the graduation of the first high school class of nine students in 1977. This was the first high school associated with the Solomon Schechter Day School Association.

In 1979, the school acquired its first dedicated facility, the former Roosevelt School in Cranford, New Jersey after holding classes in various locations across Union and Essex counties. In 1986, it purchased the Irving Laurie Building (Formerly Fairmount Elementary School part of the West Orange Public Schools) in West Orange, New Jersey. In September 1991, the Upper School moved to a newly constructed building on Pleasant Valley Way in West Orange, later named the Eric F. Ross Campus in 1995.

The Lower School underwent a $7 million renovation and expansion beginning in 2012. Additions included new science and technology labs, an outdoor classroom and garden, a synagogue, a playground, a library, and a cafeteria. The project also created dedicated art and music spaces, modernized classrooms with updated wiring, and improved accessibility.

Since 2014, Golda Och Academy has expanded its STEM programming. This has included a new STEM class and the founding of a robotics club called CodeRunners. A STEM facility was completed in September 2015.

The school has over 1,800 alumni.

== Accreditation ==
The school is accredited by the New Jersey Association of Independent Schools. It exceeds New Jersey Core Curriculum Content Standards. Golda Och Academy is a beneficiary agency of the Jewish Federation of Greater MetroWest New Jersey and the United Synagogue of Conservative Judaism.

== Athletics ==
The Golda Och Academy Road Runners compete in the Super Essex Conference, following a reorganization of sports leagues in Northern New Jersey by the New Jersey State Interscholastic Athletic Association (NJSIAA). With 95 students in grades 10-12, the school was classified by the NJSIAA for the 2019–20 school year as Non-Public B for most athletic competition purposes, which included schools with an enrollment of 37 to 366 students in that grade range (equivalent to Group I for public schools).

The school offers soccer, tennis, volleyball, cross-country, and basketball for both boys and girls at the middle school or varsity level. Baseball, softball, and a golf club are also available.

In 2013, the school's gymnasium was dedicated to gym teacher and coach Sandy Pyonin in recognition of his 40 years of service at the school. Pyonin has trained more than 30 professional basketball players and coached three teams to National Amateur Athletic Union (AAU) championships.

== Notable alumni ==
- Jessica Antiles (born 1996, class of 2015), competitive swimmer
- Rachel Antonoff (born 1981), fashion designer (didn't graduate)
- Zach Bruch (born 1993, class of 2012), technology entrepreneur
- Steven Fulop (born 1977), (didn't graduate), Mayor of Jersey City
- Ben Jorgensen (born 1983, class of 2001), former lead singer and guitarist of Armor for Sleep
- Daniel Och (born 1961), businessman and private equity investor
- Micol Ostow (born 1976, class of 1994), author, editor and educator
- Adam Pally (born 1982), actor / comedian (didn't graduate)
- Gabe Saporta (born 1979, class of 1997), lead singer of Cobra Starship
- Joshua Weinstein (born 1983, class of 2001), independent filmmaker who directed the A24 film, Menashe (2017), and the feature documentaries, Driver's Wanted (2012) and Flying on One Engine (2008)
