= 2023 American Society of Cinematographers Awards =

2024 ceremony awarding excellence in cinematography

38th ASC Awards
- Date: March 3, 2024
- Site: The Beverly Hilton, Beverly Hills
- Hosted by: Ed Helms

The 38th American Society of Cinematographers Awards were held and livestreamed worldwide on March 3, 2024, at The Beverly Hilton in Beverly Hills, California, to honor the best cinematographers of film, television and music in 2023. This year, a new music video category was added alongside the traditional awards for feature films, episodic television, and documentaries. The nominees were announced via livestream on January 11, 2024.

Filmmaker Spike Lee received the Board of Governors Award to celebrate "his respect for the partnership between director and cinematographer and how two people unite to tell a visual story in a way that can only be recognized as that of collaboration". Don Burgess, Steven Fierberg, and Amy Vincent were all recognized with special achievement awards.

== Winners and nominees ==
Winners are listed first and in bold.

=== Film ===
Theatrical Feature Film	Spotlight Award
**Hoyte van Hoytema, ASC, FSF, NSC – Oppenheimer**; Edward Lachman, ASC – El Conde; Matthew Libatique, ASC – Maestro; Rodrigo Prieto, ASC, AMC – Killers of the Flower Moon; Robbie Ryan, ISC – Poor Things	**Warwick Thornton – The New Boy**; Eric Branco – Story Ave.; Krum Rodriguez – Citizen Saint

=== Television ===
Episode of a One-Hour Regular Series	Episode of a Half-Hour Series
**M. David Mullen, ASC – The Marvelous Mrs. Maisel for "Four Minutes" (Prime Video)**; Ricardo Diaz – Winning Time: The Rise of the Lakers Dynasty for "The Second Coming" (HBO / Max); Rob C. Givens – Gotham Knights for "Daddy Issues" (CW); Glen Keenan – Star Trek: Strange New Worlds for "Hegemony" (Paramount+); Cathal Watters, ASC, ISC – Foundation for "In Seldon's Shadow" (Apple TV+)	**Carl Herse – Barry for "tricky legacies" (HBO / Max)**; Julian Court, BSC – The Diplomat for "The James Bond Clause" (Netflix); Jon Joffin, ASC – Schmigadoon! for "Something Real" (Apple TV+); Blake McClure, ASC – Minx for "I thought the bed was gonna fly" (Starz); Andrew Wehde – The Bear for "The Bear" (FX / Hulu)
Limited or Anthology Series or Motion Picture Made for TV
**Ben Kutchins, ASC – Boston Strangler (Hulu)**; Dan Atherton – Great Expectations for "The Three Keys" (FX); Sam Chiplin – The Lost Flowers of Alice Hart for "Part 1: Black Fire Orchid" (Prime Video); Igor Martinovic – George & Tammy for "Stand by Your Man" (Showtime); Jason Oldak – Lessons in Chemistry for "Book of Calvin" (Apple TV+); Tobias A. Schliessler, ASC – All the Light We Cannot See for "Episode 2" (Netflix)

=== Other media ===
Documentary Award	Music Video Award
**Curren Sheldon – King Coal**; Jeff Hutchens – Murder in Big Horn for "Episode 1"; D. Smith – Kokomo City	**Jon Joffin, ASC – "At Home" (performed by Jon Bryant)**; Scott Cunningham, ASC – "Gorilla" (performed by Little Simz); Andrey Nikolaev – "Tanto" (performed by Cassie Marin)
