= Joshua Z Weinstein =

American filmmaker

- Born: Manhattan, New York
- Education: Boston University
- Occupation: Filmmaker
- Years active: 2008–present
- Notable work: Menashe; Driver's Wanted

Joshua Z Weinstein is an American independent filmmaker based in New York City. He directed the A24 film Menashe (2017), and the feature documentaries Drivers Wanted (2012) and Flying on One Engine (2008). His director of photography credits include Bikini Moon (2017), Elaine Stritch: Shoot Me (2013), and Code of the West (2012). Weinstein was nominated for Best First Feature at the Independent Spirit Awards and Breakthrough Director at the Gotham Awards. He has been nominated for a Cannes Lion for his advertising work and won a first place POY for his work with The New York Times.

== Early life ==
Weinstein was born in Manhattan, New York but grew up in Morristown, New Jersey and attended Solomon Schechter Day School of Essex and Union (now Golda Och Academy) in West Orange, New Jersey.

He was a founding member of the post-hardcore band Trophy Scars. The DIY culture of punk rock has been influential in his filmmaking.

== Career ==
=== As a director ===
After he graduated from Boston University in 2005, Weinstein went to India to document the life of Sharad Kumar Dixit in the film Flying On One Engine. The Director of Film at SXSW, Janet Pierson, commented that, "Flying On One Engine is teeming with life, capturing raw, intimate moments soaked through with humor and surprise... It’s clear that director Joshua Weinstein, a recent BU grad, has a great way with people as well as a great feel for the telling moment. Laughter and real warmth are everywhere." The film premiered at SXSW and IDFA in 2008.

Weinstein directed the documentary, Drivers Wanted, in 2012. He was inspired to make the film because both his mother and grandfather had worked as taxi drivers in New York. It was a collaboration with acclaimed documentary editor, Jean Tsien. In The New York Times review, it was written that, "There’s an authenticity to "Drivers Wanted" that seems so true and tough that it overwhelms any standard immigrants-up-from-their-bootstraps theme." The film premiered at AFI Docs in 2012.

Menashe was Weinstein’s first fiction film. The film was shot over the course of two years in Borough Park, Brooklyn, which is home to one of the largest Orthodox Jewish populations outside of Israel, a decision that Weinstein has said was motivated by a desire for authenticity. In an interview before the film's Sundance premiere, he said, "When I thought about making a film in Borough Park, in Yiddish, with real Hasidic Jews, to me, it was just as interesting as any documentary I ever made." Weinstein was nominated for Best First Feature at the Independent Spirit Awards, Breakthrough Director at the Gotham Awards, and the Special Prix du Jury at the Deauville American Film Festival.

=== As a cinematographer ===
Weinstein has worked with independent filmmakers as a cinematographer on various films. In 2011, he worked on the documentary, Give Up Tomorrow which was nominated for an Emmy and won an Audience Award and a Jury Award at Tribeca in 2011.

He worked on the documentary Code of the West which premiered in SXSW in 2012. And in 2013, on Elaine Stritch: Shoot Me which premiered at Tribeca and was released by IFC Films. He also worked on the feature film, Bikini Moon in 2017 which was directed by Oscar-nominated Macedonian filmmaker Milcho Manchevski.

== Filmography ==
Year	Film and television	Role
2008	Flying on One Engine	Director, producer, and cinematographer
2011	Give Up Tomorrow	Cinematographer
2012	Code of the West	Cinematographer and Co-Producer
2012	Drivers Wanted	Director, producer, and cinematographer
2013	Elaine Stritch: Shoot Me	Cinematographer
2015	Frontline (1 episode)	Cinematographer
2017	Bikini Moon	Cinematographer
2017	Menashe	Director, writer, producer, and cinematographer
2018	Follow This	Cinematographer
2021	Marvel's Behind the Mask	Cinematographer
2022	Sell/Buy/Date	Cinematographer
2024	I'm Your Venus	Cinematographer
2026	Here I'm Alive	Director, writer, producer, cinematographer, editor
