= Limonada (Barry) =

"limonada"
- Barry episode
- Episode no.: Season 3 Episode 2
- Directed by: Bill Hader
- Written by: Alec Berg & Bill Hader
- Cinematography by: Carl Herse
- Editing by: Ali Greer
- Original air date: May 1, 2022
- Running time: 28 minutes

Guest appearances
- D'Arcy Carden as Natalie Greer; Michael Irby as Cristobal Sifuentes; Miguel Sandoval as Fernando; Jessy Hodges as Lindsay Mandel; Andrew Leeds as Leo Cousineau; JB Blanc as Batir; Turhan Troy Caylak as Akhmal; Elsie Fisher as Katie; Nick Gracer as Yandal; Allison Jones as herself

Episode chronology
← Previous "forgiving jeff"	Next → "ben mendelsohn"

"limonada" is the second episode of the third season of the American crime tragicomedy television series Barry. It is the 18th overall episode of the series and was written by series co-creators Alec Berg and Bill Hader, and directed by Hader, who also serves as the main lead actor. It was first broadcast on HBO in the United States on May 1, 2022, and also was available on HBO Max on the same date.

The series follows Barry Berkman, a hitman from Cleveland who travels to Los Angeles to kill someone but finds himself joining an acting class taught by Gene Cousineau, where he meets aspiring actress Sally Reed and begins to question his path in life as he deals with his criminal associates such as Monroe Fuches and NoHo Hank. In the episode, Barry decides to get an acting job for Gene in an attempt to give him a new purpose while Gene wants to escape. Meanwhile, Cristobal's criminal father-in-law arrives and his presence threatens his relationship with Hank.

According to Nielsen Media Research, the episode was seen by an estimated 0.294 million household viewers and gained a 0.06 ratings share among adults aged 18–49. The episode received critical acclaim, with critics praising the performances (particularly Hader and Winkler), writing, directing, tension, character development and ending.

== Plot ==
Barry (Bill Hader) forces Gene (Henry Winkler) to eat and stay in the trunk of his car. Barry visits Sally (Sarah Goldberg) in the writers' room for her new series Joplin, hoping that she could get Gene a role and give him a purpose in life. However, Sally says she was already unsuccessful because of Gene's terrible reputation in the industry. Barry goes ballistic and screams at her in front of everyone before leaving. Barry then goes to casting director Allison Jones to get an audition for Gene, but is rebuffed and offered a TV audition for himself.

Meanwhile, as Cristobal (Michael Irby) is about to buy lemonade from two neighborhood children, his father-in-law, crime lord Fernando (Miguel Sandoval), arrives and takes him to an Airbnb. Fernando wants Cristobal to help kill the Chechens, believing they were responsible for the monastery shooting, and then go home to his wife and children.

Sally is distracted at rehearsal by Barry's outburst. One of her co-stars, Katie (Elsie Fisher), wants to report Barry, but there is nothing she can do since Barry does not work there, wasn't violent, and didn't utter threats. To complicate matters, because of another series with a similar premise launching soon, the network moves up Joplin's premiere and wants Sally to immediately start doing press.

That night, Hank (Anthony Carrigan) and his men avoid Fernando's raid on their base after a tip from Cristobal. Later, Cristobal goes to Hank, tells him to flee from Fernando, and ends their relationship.

After Barry auditions, he asks for a role for Gene, but the casting directors refuse, citing Gene's reputation in the industry after he brought a real gun to the Full House set and insulted Jones when he failed to cast in Family Ties. Barry makes an emotional appeal citing how Gene has helped him, which lands them the roles. He calls Sally to tell her the news; she apologizes for being dismissive earlier, but Barry brushes it off and does not acknowledge his outburst. As he opens the trunk, Barry discovers that Gene has escaped.

Gene runs through the suburbs, at one point pursued by a pack of dogs, and asks for help from a waitress who does not believe him. Barry finds Gene, but his car is struck by another car. Gene flees home, asking Leo (Andrew Leeds) to call the police, but sees that Barry is already there. Barry tells Gene about the roles and threatens to kill Leo and his grandson if Gene does not seize this second chance. Gene silently agrees. Barry says he loves Gene and asks if he loves him. Gene nods, but Barry asks him to say it out loud, which Gene does. Barry asks him to repeat it, though Gene appears to hesitate.

== Production ==
=== Development ===
In April 2022, the episode's title was revealed as "limonada" and it was announced that series co-creators Alec Berg and Bill Hader had written the episode while Hader had directed it. This was Berg's eighth writing credit, Hader's eighth writing credit, and Hader's seventh directing credit.

=== Writing ===
Bill Hader explained that Barry sparing Gene's life was a result of caring for him, stating "I think he loves Gene. He really cares about him and he doesn't want to do this. It's another Chris situation. The two people Barry truly loves is Cousineau and Sally. He cares about them more than anything."

Regarding Barry's outburst and lack of apologizing to Sally, Hader said that he wanted the scene to escalate from Katie's character's perception and highlight the uncertainty of the situation with Sally's laugh. Originally, there would be scenes with Katie seeing Sally texting Barry to question him about the scene, but the crew felt that the scene could be more properly told by adding reshoots to show her worry about Sally's relationship. On her storyline, Sarah Goldberg said, "In real time, when sexual harassment in the workplace happens, it's like your brain can't catch up with your body or vice versa. And I think that you don't necessarily react in the way that you think you might, and it's only later that you have the awareness and understanding of what happened."

The last scene was met with laughter by a test screening, something that Hader attributed to a more absurdist and comedic take on the scene. Hader claimed to have sent a new version of the script, which would end up being the final version of the episode.

=== Casting ===
Casting director Allison Jones guest stars as herself, having previously appeared in "The Audition". Jones' casting assistant, Ben Harris, also appears as himself in Barry's audition scene.

== Reception ==
=== Viewers ===
The episode was watched by 0.294 million viewers, earning a 0.06 in the 18-49 rating demographics on the Nielson ratings scale. This means that 0.06 percent of all households with televisions watched the episode. This was a 18% increase from the previous episode, which was watched by 0.249 million viewers with a 0.04 in the 18-49 demographics.

=== Critical reviews ===
"limonada" received critical acclaim. The review aggregator website Rotten Tomatoes reported a 100% approval rating for the episode, based on 7 reviews with an average rating of 9.5/10.

David Cote of The A.V. Club gave the episode an "A−" and wrote, "We end on extreme close ups of a wet-eyed Barry saying, 'I love you, Mr. Cousineau. Do you love me?' Cousineau, face frozen in shock, nods. 'Can you say it?' 'I love you, Barry.' 'Can you say it again?' In this false-face world where performance corrupts every aspect of life, violence is improvised for a single take, but kindness has to be rehearsed."

Ben Rosenstock of Vulture gave the episode a perfect 5 star rating out of 5 and wrote, "Sally's obliviousness has been played for comedy until now, even as season two considerably deepened her character. But it becomes a source of drama in 'Limonada' when we learn that her relationship with Barry is not the same as the romance we once watched unfold." Nick Harley of Den of Geek gave the episode a 4.5 star rating out of 5 and wrote, "Season 3 of Barry is off to a wonderful, if terrifying start. Barry's behavior has never been more manic and threatening, but the show is still managing to be as funny as ever. Bill Hader also continues to be an absolute whiz behind the camera. He delivers two hilarious scenes by juxtaposing foreground and background action. It's savvy stuff, but we shouldn't expect anything less from this series at this point."

=== Accolades ===
TVLine named Bill Hader the "Performer of the Week" for the week of May 7, 2022, for his performance in the episode. The site wrote, "The line between comedy and drama is so thin here — at times, we're not even sure if we should be laughing or not — but Hader dances along that line like an expert circus performer. His stunning work on Barry this season is showing us a man at the very end of his rope... and that end is fraying quickly."
