= Code of the West =

Code of the West may refer to:

- Code of the West, an unwritten, socially agreed upon set of informal laws shaping the cowboy culture of the Old West
- Code of the West, a 1934 novel by Zane Grey
- Code of the West (1925 film), a 1925 American Western silent film
- Code of the West (1947 film), based on the novel by Zane Grey; previously filmed under the same name in 1925; unrelated movies of the same title were filmed in 1921 and 1929
- Code of the West (2012 film), an American 2012 documentary film
- Code of the West, a novel by Aaron Latham
