= Shoot me =

Shoot me may refer to:

- Just Shoot Me!, an American television sitcom that aired from 1997 to 2003
- Elaine Stritch: Shoot Me, a 2013 documentary film
- Shoot Me: Youth Part 1, the third extended play by South Korean band DAY6.
