= Henny Russell =

American actress

- Born: Chicago, Illinois, U.S
- Occupation: Actress
- Years active: 1997–present
- Spouse: R. Ward Duffy (m. 2004)

Henny Russell is an American actress, known for her performances on various Broadway productions. On television, she starred as Carol Denning in the Netflix comedy-drama series, Orange Is the New Black.

== Life and career ==
Russell was born and raised in Chicago, Illinois to Norwegian mother. She grew up on the Northwest Side and in Mount Prospect and Arlington Heights. She attended the Prospect High School and began perform in Goodman Theatre Young People's Drama Workshop alongside Jennifer Beals. She graduated from the New York University Tisch School of the Arts. She later received MFA from the University of San Diego. Russell married actor R. Ward Duffy; they live in New York City.

=== Theater ===
During her career, Russell performed on Broadway, off-Broadway and regional theatres. She made her Broadway debut starring in the 2001 revival of Todd Haimes Theatre's Major Barbara. She later performed in Impressionism, The Royal Family, Lombardi, The Other Place, The Winslow Boy, Machinal and The Audience. She starred in both off-Broadway and Broadway productions of play Oslo from 2016 to 2017. As a part of the cast, Russell received Obie Award in 2017. In 2024 she played Barbara Fordham in The Repertory Theatre of St. Louis' production of August: Osage County.

=== Film and television ===
Russell made her television debut in 1997 playing guest-starring roles on Silk Stalkings and Pensacola: Wings of Gold. She later made guest appearances in Law & Order, Gossip Girl, Law & Order: Special Victims Unit, The Leftovers, Elementary and Chicago Med. She also appeared in films Corn (2004), Revolutionary Road (2008), You Don't Know Jack (2010), Kilimanjaro (2013), Freeheld (2015) and Bikini Moon (2017). In 2018, Russell starred as inmate Carol Denning in the Netflix comedy-drama series, Orange Is the New Black during the show' sixth season. She later guest-starred in Blue Bloods, The Good Fight, FBI: Most Wanted and The Other Two. Russell also had recurring roles in the crime drama Hightown and the drama series Three Women. In 2023 she had a supporting role in the drama film The Magnificent Meyersons starring opposite her Orange Is the New Black co-star, Kate Mulgrew.

== Filmography ==
=== Film ===
Year	Film	Role	Notes
2004	Corn	Supermarket Customer	
2007	Tie a Yellow Ribbon	Landlord	
2008	Revolutionary Road	Aunt Claire	
2008	Possible Side Effects	Mrs. Collins	Television Film
2010	You Don't Know Jack	Oakhill Spokesperson	
2013	Kilimanjaro	Ellen	
2015	Growing Up Smith	Christian Woman	
2015	Freeheld	Dr. Sarah Tonner	
2015	Bridge of Spies	Receptionist	
2017	Bikini Moon	City Clerk	
2023	The Magnificent Meyersons	Jackie	
2025	Birthrite	Carolyn	

=== Television ===
Year	Title	Role	Notes
1997	Silk Stalkings	Newscaster	Episode: "Ladies Man"
1997	Pensacola: Wings of Gold	Barbara Niles	Episode: "Past Sins"
2005	Hope & Faith	Tiffany	Episode: "Faith Fairfield: 1980-2005"
2009	Gossip Girl	Helen	Episode: "In the Realm of the Bases"
2005-2010	Law & Order	Kate Orris, Melanie Marron	Episodes: "Locomotion" and "Brazil"
2013	Law & Order: Special Victims Unit	Faith Greyland	Episode: "Imprisoned Lives"
2014	Unforgettable	Casper	Episode: Haircut
2014	The Leftovers	Dr. Chambliss	Episode: "B.J. and the A.C"
2016	Elementary	Captain	Episode: "A Study in Charlotte"
2018	Chicago Med	Nancy Buckley	Episode: "Ties that Bind"
2018	Orange Is the New Black	Carol Denning	Recurring role (season 6)
2019	Blue Bloods	Lt. Sue Prentice	Episode: "Past Tense"
2019	Madam Secretary	Candice	Episode: "The New Normal"
2021	The Good Fight	Mrs. Joy	Episode: "And the Detente Had an End"
2022	FBI: Most Wanted	Rose Daly	Episode: "Gold Diggers"
2023	The Other Two	Lisa	Episodes: "Brooke Hosts a Night of Undeniable Good" and "Cary Pays Off His Student Loans"
2024	Three Women	Rosemary	3 episodes
2020-2024	Hightown	Dr. Sheila Larkin	5 episodes
2025	Doc	Cece	Episode: "One Small Step"
2025	Elsbeth	Winnie Crawford	Episode: "Bunker Down"
