= Bubble & Squeak (film) =

American independent film

- Directed by: Evan Twohy
- Written by: Evan Twohy
- Produced by: Christina Oh; Steven Yeun
- Starring: Himesh Patel; Steven Yeun; Dave Franco; Sarah Goldberg
- Cinematography: Anna Smoroňová
- Edited by: Sara Shaw
- Music by: Brad Oberhofer
- Production companies: Celadon Pictures; American Light & Fixture; Three Brothers
- Release date: January 24, 2025 (Sundance)
- Running time: 95 minutes
- Country: United States
- Language: English

Bubble & Squeak is a 2025 American drama film written and directed by Evan Twohy starring Himesh Patel, Sarah Goldberg, Steven Yeun and Dave Franco.

It premiered as part of the U.S. Dramatic Competition at the 2025 Sundance Film Festival on January 24, 2025, where it received negative reviews from critics.

== Premise ==
A young married couple are pursued by a border agent who suspects them of smuggling cabbages.

== Cast ==
- Himesh Patel as Declan
- Sarah Goldberg as Delores
- Steven Yeun as Bkofl
- Dave Franco as Norman
- Matt Berry as Shazbor
- Ursel Tilk as Officer
- Jaak Prints as Yaroslav
- Inga Salurand as Jelena
- Zoë Chao as Rhonda

== Production ==
The film is written and directed by Evan Twohy from his own stage play. The script was included on the Hollywood Black List of the best unproduced scripts in December 2020. It is produced by Christina Oh and Steven Yeun. Sarah Goldberg, Himesh Patel, Yeun, Matt Berry and Dave Franco lead the cast. The cast also includes Estonian actors Ursel Tilk, Jaak Prints, and Inga Salurand.

Principal photography took place in Estonia.

== Release ==
It premiered at the 2025 Sundance Film Festival on January 24, 2025.

== Reception ==
On the review aggregator website Rotten Tomatoes, 32% of 25 critics' reviews are positive, with an average rating of 4.5/10. The website's consensus simply reads: "A struggle and bleak." Metacritic, which uses a weighted average, assigned the film a score of 38 out of 100, based on 9 critics, indicating "generally unfavorable" reviews.
