= Sisters (2023 TV series) =

Irish-Canadian television series

- Genre: Comedy drama
- Created by: Sarah Goldberg; Susan Stanley
- Written by: Sarah Goldberg; Susan Stanley
- Directed by: Declan Lowney; Alicia McDonald
- Starring: Sarah Goldberg; Susan Stanley
- Countries of origin: Ireland; Canada
- Original language: English
- No. of seasons: 2
- No. of episodes: 12

Production
- Executive producers: Angela Squire; Richard Cook; Sarah Goldberg; Susan Stanley; Declan Lowney; Christina Jennings; Scott Garvie; Alexandra Finlay; Kira Carstensen; Melanie Donkers; Ruth Coady; Justin Healy
- Producer: Mary McCarthy
- Production location: Dublin
- Running time: 25 minutes
- Production companies: Peer Pressure Productions; Shaftesbury Films

Original release
- Network: RTÉ One (Ireland); Crave (Canada)
- Release: 30 March 2023 – present

Sisters (stylized SisterS) is an Irish-Canadian comedy drama television series created by and starring Sarah Goldberg and Susan Stanley. It premiered on RTÉ One on 30 March 2023.

The show was greenlit on 10 June 2022 by RTÉ in Ireland, Crave in Canada, and IFC in the United States, with international distribution handled by Fremantle, following a six-year gestation period.

The series had its Canadian premiere on Crave on 17 May 2023. The second season premiered in Ireland on 29 January 2026.

== Premise ==
SisterS follows two women, one from Canada and the other from Ireland, who discover they are half-sisters. They embark on a road trip to find their alcoholic father.

== Cast and characters ==
- Sarah Goldberg as Sare
- Susan Stanley as Suze
- Sophie Thompson as Sheryl
- Pat Shortt as Deryl
- Donal Logue as Jimmy

== Episodes ==
No.	Title	Directed by	Written by	Original release date
1	"They F*** You Up"	Declan Lowney	Sarah Goldberg & Susan Stanley	30 March 2023
Following her mother's death, Sare decides to travel to Ireland to find the father she has newly learned about.
2	"Mind That Child"	Declan Lowney	Sarah Goldberg & Susan Stanley	30 March 2023
Recognising that she is out of choices, Suze unwillingly consents to assist Sare in locating their father. Sare takes a dump.
3	"This Too Shall Pass"	Declan Lowney	Sarah Goldberg & Susan Stanley	30 March 2023
4	"Every Time The Sun Comes Up I'm In Trouble"	Alicia McDonald	Sarah Goldberg & Susan Stanley	30 March 2023
5	"I Can Change"	Alicia McDonald	Sarah Goldberg & Susan Stanley	30 March 2023
6	"Happy Ever After"	Alicia McDonald	Sarah Goldberg & Susan Stanley	30 March 2023

== Reception ==
=== Critical response ===
Daniel Fienberg of The Hollywood Reporter wrote that "There are several points at which you can imagine SisterS wanting to say something about actual modern life in Ireland, but only landing at a halfway point between "old" and "new" and therefore not saying anything at all — like how the series treats a funny and slightly disturbing subplot involving abortion. The show knows that there's a cultural conversation to be had, but not how it wants to participate...Might there be a version of SisterS in which more of the stereotypes were turned on their heads, that found an angle on contemporary religion in Ireland that could have given nuance to the abortion subplot and would have made Sheryl's innocuous antisemitism have substance? Probably, and it might have been better. But the show that's here isn't bad, in large part because longtime friends and collaborators Goldberg and Stanley build the relationship between these strangers in a way that is likably warm and yet uneasy, without going quite as dark as the show's clear inspirations — Fleabag and, especially, Catastrophe are central to the DNA — might have gone. SisterS has undercurrents exploring alcoholism, abuse and the impact of absentee parents, but it's more likely to settle for broad humor over meaning in its murkier terrain."
