= Zach Bruch =

American technology entrepreneur

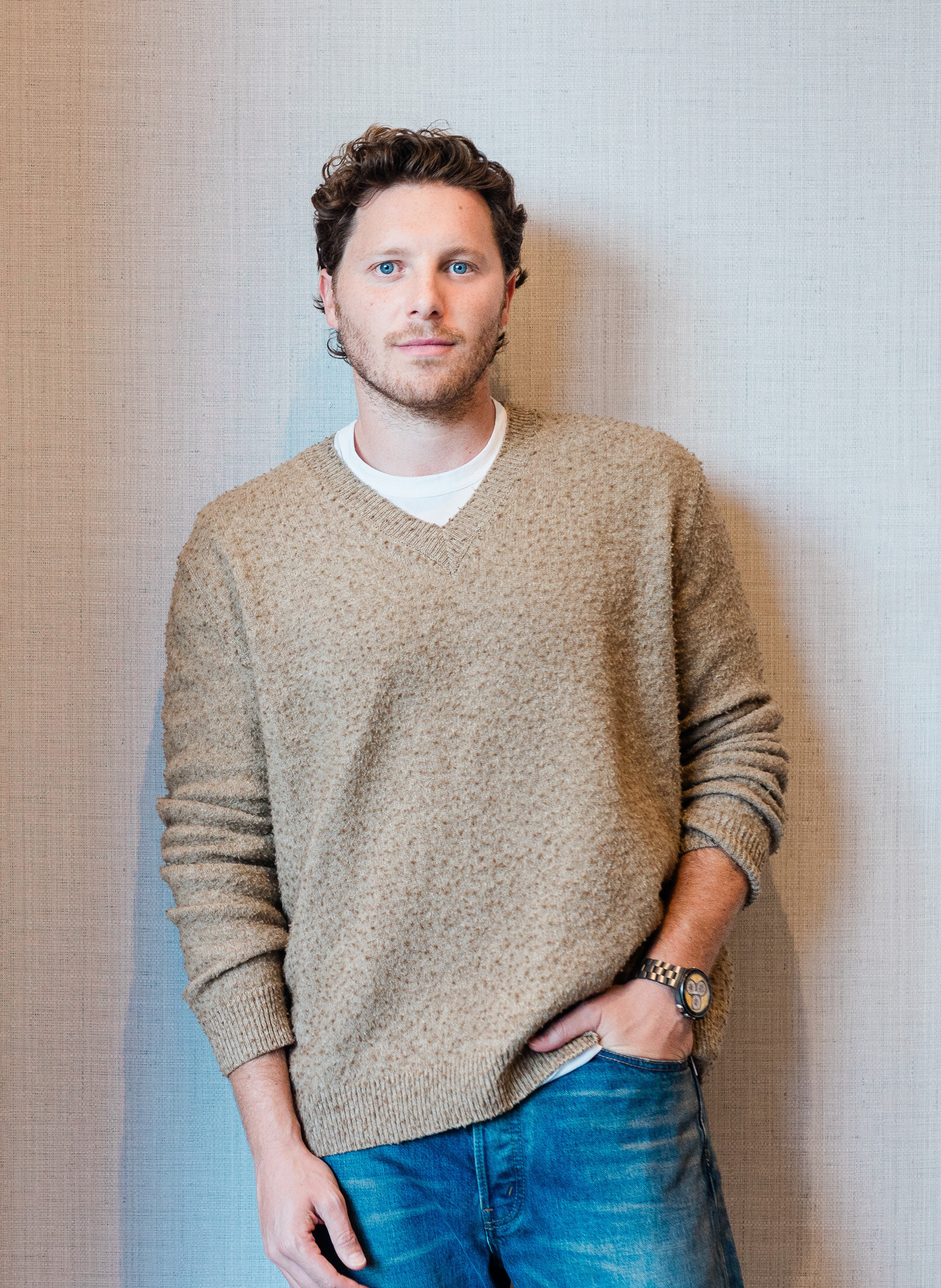
- Born: October 15, 1993 (age 32); New York City, New York, U.S.
- Education: Golda Och Academy; University of Michigan
- Occupation: Entrepreneur

Zach Bruch (born October 15, 1993) is an American technology entrepreneur. He is known for founding technology companies, including MyPrize and RECUR.

== Early life and education ==
Born in New York City, Bruch was raised in a Jewish family in West Caldwell, New Jersey. He attended Golda Och Academy, and later completed his Bachelor's Degree at the University of Michigan, Ann Arbor, where he studied and majored in International Economics and Political Development.

== Career ==
While a student at the University of Michigan, Bruch co-founded Symplenish, a logistics software company, as well as Ann Arbaugh, an apparel company.

Bruch began his career at Kraken, where he helped establish their first over-the-counter (OTC) trading desk. He later joined DRW and became the Head of Sales Trading for the Americas. Following this, he served as Global Co-Head of OTC Trading at JST Capital.

Following the collapse of FTX, Bruch was selected by the U.S. Department of Justice as one of nine representatives on the FTX creditors committee, where he helped recover billions of dollars for himself and the other victims of the FTX exchange's collapse through strategic decisions and transactions.

In 2021, Bruch co-founded and served as CEO of RECUR, a Web3 platform and enterprise marketing infrastructure company that supported public companies including Paramount Global, Sanrio, and Playtika. Under his leadership, the company reached a valuation of over $300 million and secured $50 million in venture capital funding from hedge fund manager Steven A. Cohen, who joined RECUR's board.

Also in 2021, Bruch co-founded and incubated Switchboard, a data and oracle platform for the Solana blockchain and other blockchain networks.

== MyPrize ==
Since late 2023, Bruch serves as Founder and CEO of MyPrize, a social gaming and creator-led entertainment platform backed by Dragonfly Capital.

MyPrize is an online entertainment platform that combines livestreaming, social features, and free-to-play games. The company was reported to be among the fastest growing gaming businesses in the United States in 2025. Within its first year of operation, MyPrize reported billions in gross marketplace volume and hundreds of millions in revenue.

In 2025, MyPrize raised $21 million, bringing the total amount raised by the company to $38 million, and nearly doubling the company’s valuation to $250 million less than 2 years after founding.

In December 2025, MyPrize announced NBA MVP and perennial all-star, James Harden as their first-ever Premier Creator to begin livestreaming on the MyPrize platform. MyPrize also announced that it will be launching CFTC-regulated prediction markets in partnership with Crypto.com.

== Recognition ==
- 2021 - Forbes’ 30 Under 30
