= Jessica Antiles =

American swimmer (born 1996)

Personal information
- Full name: Jessica Antiles
- Nationality: United States
- Born: December 25, 1996 (age 29)

Sport
- Sport: Swimming
- College team: Columbia University
Medal record
Women's swimming
Representing the United States
Maccabiah Games
Silver medal – second place	2017 Israel	400 m individual medley
Bronze medal – third place	2017 Israel	200 m individual medley

Jessica Antiles (born December 25, 1996) is an American swimmer. Antiles was one of 24 swimmers who swam for Team USA at the 2017 Maccabiah Games, where she won two medals.

== Personal life ==
Antiles grew up in South Orange, New Jersey, is the daughter of Seth and Janette Antiles, and is Jewish. She is a member of the Maplewood Jewish Center, where her father is president. Her mother Janette competed in the Maccabiah Games herself, in tennis, representing Venezuela.

Antiles graduated from Golda Och Academy in 2015. She continued her education at Columbia University, where she majored in psychology and competed on the varsity swimming team, graduating in 2019. In 2017, Antiles received an honorable mention by the College Swimming & Diving Coaches Association of America (CSCAA) as recognition for Scholar All-America.

== Swimming career ==
Antiles has been competitively swimming since childhood, including competing for her hometown swim team, the South Orange Dolphins.

=== High school ===
In 2013 as a high school sophomore, she tied the prep championships record for the 200-yard individual medley with a 2:08.88 finish. The following year as a junior, Antiles broke the record in the event that had stood for 35 years with a time of 2:03.50. As a senior in 2015, Antiles once again broke the record, with a time of 2:02.63. In addition, at the 2015 championships, Antiles broke the 100-yard butterfly record with a time of 00:56.01, breaking the previous record of 00:56.85. These records were added to her other previous prep championships record in the 100-yard breaststroke with a time of 1:03.91. She also holds the Essex County meet record in the 200 IM with 2:02.62, along with the 100 freestyle with 51.47, and was the New Jersey record holder in the 200 IM with a time of 2:00.84, from March 2014 until December 2015.

=== Olympic trials ===
In 2014, at the CeraVe Invitational, Antiles qualified for the Olympic trials, finishing in second place in the 400-meter long course individual medley with a time of 26.93. Prior to her official qualifiers however, Antiles required surgery due to a sinus infection, which left her unable to swim for 75 days, impacting her training and resulting in her failure to qualify.

=== 2017 Maccabiah Games ===
Representing Team USA at the 2017 Maccabiah Games, Antiles won the silver medal in the 400-meter individual medley with a time of 4:58.27 and a bronze medal in the 200 Individual Medley. She also had a fourth-place finish in the 200-meter backstroke with a time of 2:20.89 and 100-meter breaststroke with a time of 1:13.59. She also finished in 20th place in the 200-meter butterfly.

When asked about the experience Antiles stated: "this was one of the most amazing experiences of my life. It was such an honor and such a special opportunity to be able to compete in Israel among some of the greatest Jewish athletes in the word."

=== Israeli National Championship ===
In 2014, while living in Israel, Antiles won four gold medals during the Israeli National Championship. She won in all four events she competed in, which were the 200-meter individual medley, the 400-meter individual medley, the 800-meter freestyle, and the 400-meter freestyle.
