= Tricky legacies =

"tricky legacies"
- Barry episode
- Episode no.: Season 4 Episode 5
- Directed by: Bill Hader
- Written by: Bill Hader
- Cinematography by: Carl Herse
- Editing by: Ali Greer
- Original air date: May 7, 2023
- Running time: 33 minutes

Guest appearances
- D'Arcy Carden as Natalie Greer; Emily Spivey as Gina; Annie Chang as Josie; Spenser Granese as Bevel; Adrian Sparks as Diner Owner; Zachary Golinger as John

Episode chronology
← Previous "it takes a psycho"	Next → "the wizard"

"tricky legacies" is the fifth episode of the fourth season of the American crime tragicomedy television series Barry. It is the 29th overall episode of the series and was written and directed by series co-creator Bill Hader, who also serves as lead actor. It was first broadcast on HBO in the United States on May 7, 2023, and also was available on HBO Max on the same date.

The series follows Barry Berkman, a hitman from Cleveland who travels to Los Angeles to kill someone but finds himself joining an acting class taught by Gene Cousineau, where he meets aspiring actress Sally Reed and begins to question his path in life as he deals with his criminal associates such as Monroe Fuches and NoHo Hank. The previous seasons saw Barry try to decide between both lives, which culminated in his arrest. In the episode, Barry's and Sally's new life eight years after his escape from prison is explored as they live with their son, John. Gene, who has been hiding outside the country during this time, returns to LA in light of important news concerning his legacy.

According to Nielsen Media Research, the episode was seen by an estimated 0.279 million household viewers and gained a 0.07 ratings share among adults aged 18–49. The episode received critical acclaim, with critics praising the series' new focus, performances (particularly Goldberg), tone, character development, directing and ending.

== Plot ==
Eight years have passed since Barry (Bill Hader) and Sally (Sarah Goldberg) ran away together. They have since been married, settled in a remote house in the Midwestern U.S., and had a son named John. (Note: As depicted in the final scene of "it takes a psycho".) Barry, now a stay-at-home father going by "Clark", and John (Zachary Golinger) meet with neighbor boy Travis and his father, and John apologizes for punching Travis. John feels frustrated that Travis wasn't nicer to him after the apology. Barry reaffirms that John can control his anger like he did.

Sally now works at a diner, using a brunette wig and going by "Emily". Her co-workers are unpleasant, and she often drinks when not at home. John has limited knowledge of the world and his parents' real nature since they watch his every move, homeschool him, and only allow him to use a computer if it is one of theirs and they are monitoring him. The family regularly listens to megachurch sermons online, and Barry often highlights bad deeds that figures such as Abraham Lincoln and Mahatma Gandhi committed, believing this will eventually help John see him as good. John takes an interest in baseball after bonding with Travis, who gives him a mitt. Barry discovers the mitt in John's room and, concerned about being seen at a public game, shows him death incidents in little league baseball to dissuade him from playing.

Sally converses with Bevel (Spenser Granese), a co-worker who makes it clear he fantasizes about her. They go to the diner's restroom, where Sally kisses him, then suddenly starts to strangle him. Bevel pulls her wig off and is shocked to see her real hair. He promises to not say anything and leaves. While cleaning, John finds Barry's military shadow box. Barry opens up about his military background but whitewashes his actions and claims he was a medic. At night, Barry and Sally hear a knock at the door. Sally sleeps with John in the bathtub while Barry stands guard outside with his gun, hearing only the faint sound of youths laughing and running away, and stays vigilant until the morning.

At a Warner Bros. office, studio PA Josie (Annie Chang) is surprised to find a bearded Gene Cousineau (Henry Winkler), who was reported missing and presumed dead since Barry's escape, having fled the country after accidentally shooting his son Leo. Gene is allowed to stay after saying he knows the studio is planning a project that has piqued his interest. Back at the diner, Sally tells her manager that Bevel has been stealing from the register, and the manager says he will find a replacement. Returning to her house, Sally is disheartened to see that Natalie (D'Arcy Carden) has found immense success with her BanShe sitcom Just Desserts, now nearing its finale. While Barry talks with John, Sally calls her husband by his real name, confusing John. An incensed Sally informs Barry that Gene has resurfaced and wants to get involved as a consultant for a biopic based on the couple, prompting Barry to declare that he must kill Gene.

== Production ==
=== Development ===
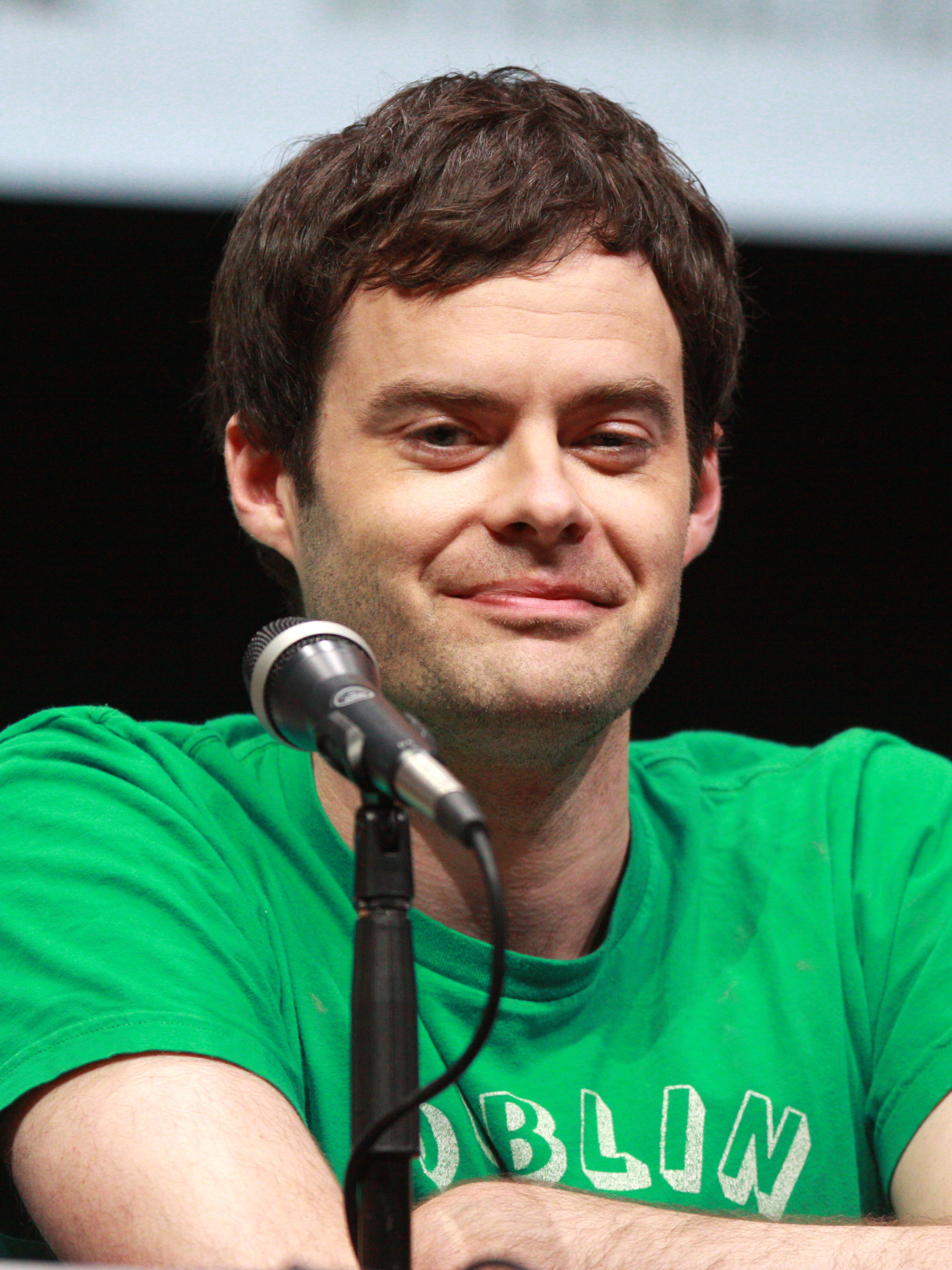
Series co-creator and lead actor Bill Hader wrote and directed the episode.

In April 2023, the episode's title was revealed as "tricky legacies" and it was announced that series creator and lead actor Bill Hader had written and directed it. This was Hader's eleventh writing credit, and his fifteenth directing credit.

=== Writing ===
The decision to make a time jump was conceived in the early stages of the season, when the writers discussed it in summer 2020. The writers wanted to explore Barry's dream of having a family with Sally, preferring to skip the time spent on the run as they deemed it "uninteresting." The writers settled on an eight-year time jump, which would line up with the age of John, as well as introducing the aspect of the biopic, which would serve as a catalyst for the characters. Originally, the episode would revolve around all main characters of the series, but Bill Hader thought it would be interesting if they focused solely on Barry and Sally, as "it'd be nice to just live in the jump for a second."

By giving a son to Barry, Hader wanted Barry to have "a chance to be the person he always wanted to be in the eyes of his son, which is a hero and a guy who does the right thing and a guy who's not violent." He also gave Barry the running gag of finding any flaw in Abraham Lincoln, saying "In his mind, he's like, 'I'm like Abraham Lincoln. I'm a good person, but I also did some terrible things. I have a tricky legacy, but these people are all remembered for being great people.' So that's what he's wanting, and he is very concerned about how his son sees him and how his son will remember him." Barry's constant use of religion was used as "He can't really find redemption with anybody else, so he's turned to God for redemption... but again, I don't think he really understands religion."

Sally's personality was defined by Hader as "she's living Barry's dream. I don't think she wanted a kid. This is not for her. It's kind of like her own prison." He also explained that Sally killing a person and then trying to get into acting coaching, "that this is where I deserve to go is with a bad guy." Sarah Goldberg was excited about the prospect of the episode, explaining she asked Hader "Can we please go like full Gena Rowlands' Woman Under the Influence/Opening Night? Can we go all the way down to the darkness?" She said, "They're terrible parents. But she's living his dream. It's a nightmare for her, but I think there's a part of her that feels like, maybe this is what I deserve." She considered that Sally's decision to stay with him is also out of fear, as she has nowhere to go and her only option would be to stay with Barry. She further added, "I don't think there's a happily ever after for these two. I don't think it's ever been a love story between Barry and Sally. At worst, I'd say it's been convenience, and at best it's been survival — but never a love story."

The scene where Barry goes outside when someone knocks on the door was not completely taken literally by Hader, who explained, "It was kind of the idea that the darkness plays a lot into the show of people coming in and out of darkness." He further added, "That thing, whatever that is, is just gonna knock on the door at some point and I think Barry just goes and stares it down. That was the feeling behind it at least, but people can have their own interpretations of it."

=== Filming ===
The episode was filmed in Lancaster, California. According to Hader, there is no specific location as to where the events of the episode take place, only referring to it as "somewhere in that part of the country out in the middle of nowhere."

== Reception ==
=== Ratings ===
The episode was watched by 0.279 million viewers, earning a 0.07 in the 18-49 rating demographics on the Nielson ratings scale. This means that 0.07 percent of all households with televisions watched the episode. This was a slight decrease from the previous episode, which was watched by 0.303 million viewers with a 0.08 in the 18-49 demographics.

=== Critical reception ===
"tricky legacies" received critical acclaim. On the review aggregator Rotten Tomatoes, it holds an approval rating of 88% based on 8 reviews, with an average rating of 8.7/10. Matt Schimkowitz of The A.V. Club gave the episode an "A–" and wrote, "After last week’s clearing of the board, 'tricky legacies' doubles down on darkness, depression, and duplicity. The doubling of characters and resetting identities through a filter of filth and decay evokes Twin Peaks' final episode, when Dale Cooper awakes in Odessa, Texas, in a seemingly different reality. Barry and Sally have changed superficially, but ultimately the past remains a part of them, a trauma they cannot escape, no matter how much they try to outrun it."

Alan Sepinwall of Rolling Stone wrote, "All of this is interesting to some degree, but 'Tricky Legacies' does too good a job of making us appreciate the misery and boredom of the life these two fugitives have built for themselves. In addition to the time-jump, this fits into another prestige TV trend: the departure episode, which either focuses on relatively minor characters, or else deviates wildly from the usual format. Often, these are among my favorite episodes in a given season of those shows. This one, though, was a tough sit: making its glum points again and again, until I was incredibly relieved to see the action cut back to Los Angeles for a glimpse of a bearded Gene Cousineau returning to town to get involved with a planned Barry Berkman biopic." Ben Rosenstock of Vulture gave the episode a 4 star rating out of 5 and wrote, "Except for one scene near the end, 'Tricky Legacies' takes place entirely outside of Los Angeles, immersing us in a world that looks and sounds different from what we're used to on Barry. Most of the episode is spent catching us up on Barry and Sally's new life, denying us much of the resolution we might've hoped for. What's going on with Hank? Is Fuches still in prison? Is Leo okay? Those questions will have to wait."

Steve Greene of IndieWire gave the episode an "A–" and wrote, "Barry gets so much out of hard cuts. Hopping between characters and slicing off conversations is part of what gives the show its comic edge. 'Tricky Legacies' swaps out those harsh transitions for gentler dissolves. In a way, it's another blurring of past and present, of phasing things out rather than lopping them off definitively." Josh Spiegel of /Film wrote, "It is, if nothing else, quickly becoming like some truly great films that are also the opposite of rewatchable. 'tricky legacies' is a fine episode of television, but it seems likely that we're only going to get grimmer before the series wraps up... whee?"

=== Accolades ===
TVLine named Sarah Goldberg as the "Performer of the Week" for the week of May 13, 2023, for her performance in the episode. The site wrote, "Goldberg has been wowing us for four seasons now with her work as ruthlessly ambitious actress Sally on HBO's pitch-black hitman comedy. But this week, she topped herself by essentially crafting a performance within a performance as Sally took on a new identity and completely transformed herself into a frustrated mother drinking herself into oblivion."
