= Sam Singer (basketball) =

American-Israeli basketball player

Sam Singer סם סינגר
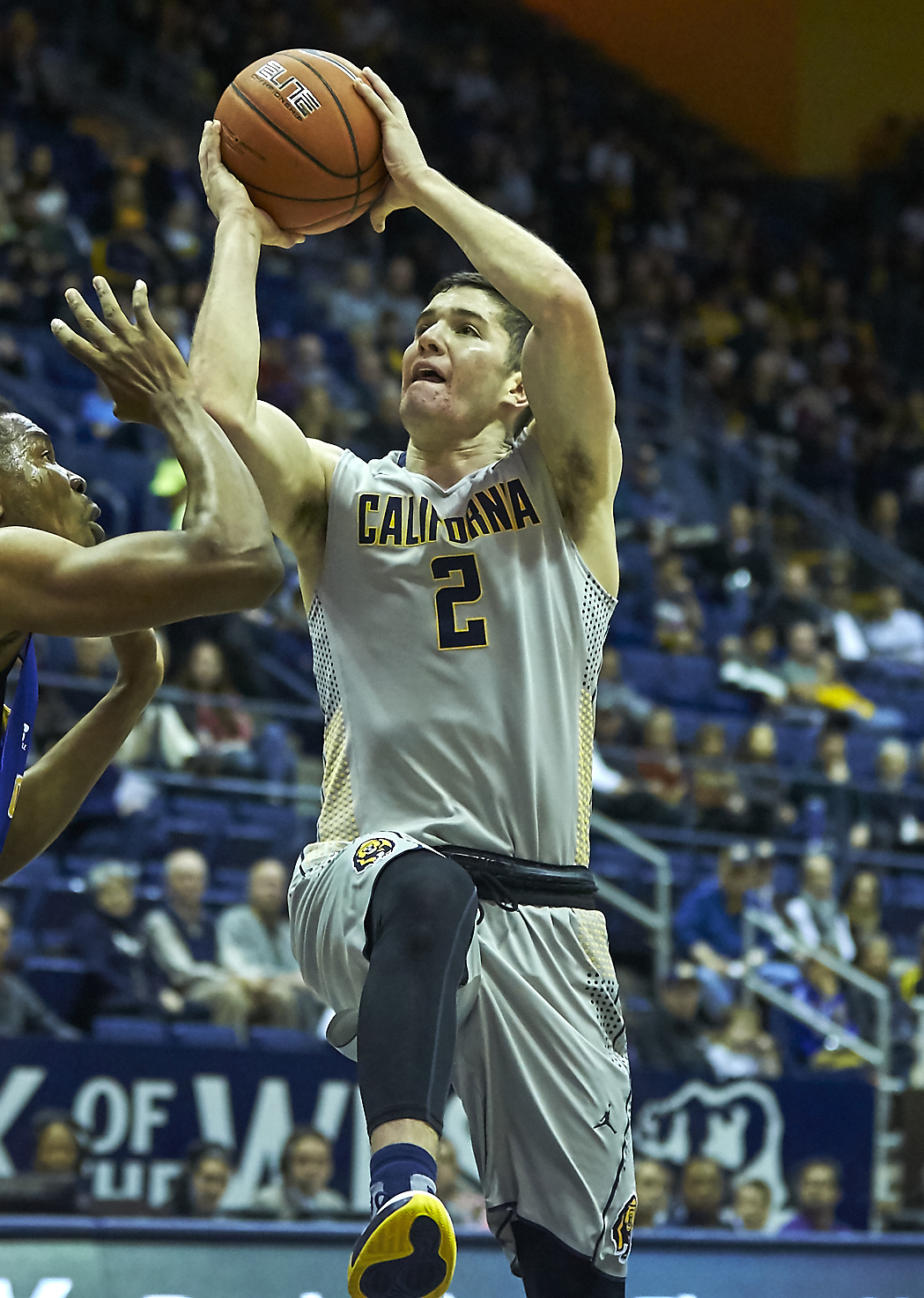

Free agent
- Position: Point guard / shooting guard

Personal information
- Born: February 14, 1995 (age 31)
- Listed height: 6 ft 4 in (1.93 m)
- Listed weight: 205 lb (93 kg)

Career information
- High school: Ransom Everglades (Miami, Florida)
- College: California (2013–2017)
- NBA draft: 2017: undrafted
- Playing career: 2017–present

Career history
- 2017–2019: Bnei Herzliya

Sam Singer (Hebrew: סם סינגר; born February 14, 1995) is an American-Israeli professional basketball player who last played for Bnei Herzliya of the Israeli Premier League. He played college basketball for the California Golden Bears. In his four years at Cal, he was a three-time Pac-12 All-Academic Honorable Mention and played the third-most games in school history.

== Early life ==
Singer is from Miami, Florida, and is Jewish. His father is Robert Singer and his mother is Jani Kline Singer. His paternal grandfather, David, was in the U.S. Army in World War II.

He attended Ransom Everglades School in Miami, Florida, where he was regarded as one of the top guard prospects in the state of Florida. Singer averaged 27.3 points, 10.4 rebounds and 7.3 assists to lead the Raiders to the Class 4A state semifinals and a 27-3 record as a senior. He was named to the Florida vs. U.S.A. Hardwood Classic All-Star team in 2013.

== College career ==
Singer played college basketball for the California Golden Bears, where he averaged 4.5 points, 2.9 rebounds, and 1.9 assists in 20.1 minutes of action. Singer was named an Allstate Good Works Team nominee for his dedication to serving the community and Pac-12 All-Academic Honorable Mention. In his four years at Cal, he was a three-time Pac-12 All-Academic Honorable Mention and played the third-most games in school history with 133. He graduated from Berkeley in 2017 with a degree in Business Administration from the Haas School of Business.

== Professional career ==
On August 4, 2017, Singer started his professional career with Bnei Herzliya of the Israeli Premier League, signing a three-year deal. On February 10, 2019, Singer parted ways with Herzliya.

== Maccabiah Games ==
Singer played for Team USA in basketball at the 2017 Maccabiah Games, where he won a gold medal and averaged 9.3 points per game. He played on the team with among others Jordan Cohen and Travis Warech.
