= It takes a psycho =

"it takes a psycho"
- Barry episode
- Episode no.: Season 4 Episode 4
- Directed by: Bill Hader
- Written by: Taofik Kolade
- Cinematography by: Carl Herse
- Editing by: Franky Guttman
- Original air date: April 30, 2023
- Running time: 34 minutes

Guest appearances
- Michael Irby as Cristobal Sifuentes; Fred Melamed as Tom Posorro; Andrew Leeds as Leo Cousineau; Sian Heder as Herself; Michael Ironside as Andrei; Gary Kraus as Chief Krauss; Richard Riehle as Warden Reynolds; François Chau as Bong; Paul McCrane as Mark Staffordshire; JB Blanc as Batir; Ellyn Jameson as Kristen; Tobie Windham as "Groove Tube" Damian; Andre Hyland as "Live Wire" Jason; Zachary Golinger as John

Episode chronology
← Previous "you're charming"	Next → "tricky legacies"

"it takes a psycho" is the fourth episode of the fourth season of the American crime tragicomedy television series Barry. It is the 28th overall episode of the series and was written by Taofik Kolade and directed by series creator Bill Hader, who also serves as lead actor. It was first broadcast on HBO in the United States on April 30, 2023, and also was available on HBO Max on the same date.

The series follows Barry Berkman, a hitman from Cleveland who travels to Los Angeles to kill someone but finds himself joining an acting class taught by Gene Cousineau, where he meets aspiring actress Sally Reed and begins to question his path in life as he deals with his criminal associates such as Monroe Fuches and NoHo Hank. The previous seasons saw Barry try to decide between both lives, which culminated in his arrest. In the episode, Barry's escape prompts authorities to start searching for him. With Barry mostly absent, the episode focuses on Sally, Hank and Gene, all of which have different stakes at hand.

According to Nielsen Media Research, the episode was seen by an estimated 0.303 million household viewers and gained a 0.08 ratings share among adults aged 18–49. The episode received universal acclaim from critics, who praised Hader's directing and Barry's limited presence, as well as the character development, focus on the supporting cast, performances (particularly Carrigan, Irby, and Goldberg), emotional weight, sound mixing and twist ending, and was named one of the best television episodes of the year by several publications. Carrigan submitted the episode to support his 2023 Emmy nomination for Outstanding Supporting Actor in a Comedy Series.

== Plot ==
Warden Reynolds (Richard Riehle) has guards attack Fuches (Stephen Root), accusing him of being involved in Barry's escape. (Note: As depicted in "you're charming".) With Barry on the run, Hank (Anthony Carrigan) and Cristobal (Michael Irby) increase security at the crew's compound and reward their workers by giving them an entertainment room. Tom (Fred Melamed) and Leo (Andrew Leeds) place Gene (Henry Winkler) alone in an isolated cabin to prevent him from talking to the press again before trial. Later, he is informed of Barry's escape and prepares his revolver.

Meanwhile, Sally (Sarah Goldberg) helps Kristen (Ellyn Jameson) prepare for her role on the set of the blockbuster superhero film project Mega Girls directed by Sian Heder. Kristen melts down over forgetting a line and Sally follows her, missing a phone call from Lindsay. She recites the entire line to Kristen, but slyly tries to poach the role by delivering it to Heder, who rebuffs her. Kristen's agent, Mark Staffordshire (Paul McCrane), offers to help her rebuild her acting career in exchange for continuing to coach Kristen, with the caveat that she will likely never receive major roles again due to her reputation. Meeting with Kristen, Sally is shaken to discover that Barry has escaped.

At lunch, Fuches walks into the cafeteria bruised and bloody, and notices the respect the other prisoners give him for his loyalty to Barry despite being betrayed, choosing to wait until he has started eating to begin their own meals. Jim (Robert Wisdom) follows the authorities as they raid the Dave & Buster's, mistaking it for the crew's base. Hank takes the crew to view the sand in a containment silo, where he traps them and buries them. Hank barely rescues Cristobal, who failed to follow his call to step outside. The Chechens seize the compound and the boss, Andrei (Michael Ironside), spares Cristobal because of his relationship with Hank.

As night falls, Gene shoots someone at the door and flees, unaware it was Leo bringing him food. At their house, Cristobal calls Hank psychopathic and no longer the man he fell in love with. Hank replies that they either would have been betrayed or killed by the Chechen elders. Cristobal leaves despite Hank's warning that he now knows too much. Hank cries inside the house shortly before a Chechen henchman shows him that assassins shot Cristobal dead.

Sally arrives home, unaware that Jim has been staking out her apartment. Upon entering, she calls for Barry (Bill Hader), who steps out from a darkened room, asking to stay. To his surprise, Sally tells him they both should leave.

Two boys named John (Zachary Golinger) and Travis fight in a remote setting similar to Barry's prior daydreams. Scolded by Travis's father, John goes home, where his parents are revealed to be an older Barry and Sally. Barry says he will talk with John.

== Production ==
=== Development ===
In April 2023, the episode's title was revealed as "it takes a psycho" and it was announced that Taofik Kolade had written the episode while series creator and lead actor Bill Hader had directed it. This was Kolade's second writing credit, and Hader's fourteenth directing credit.

=== Writing ===
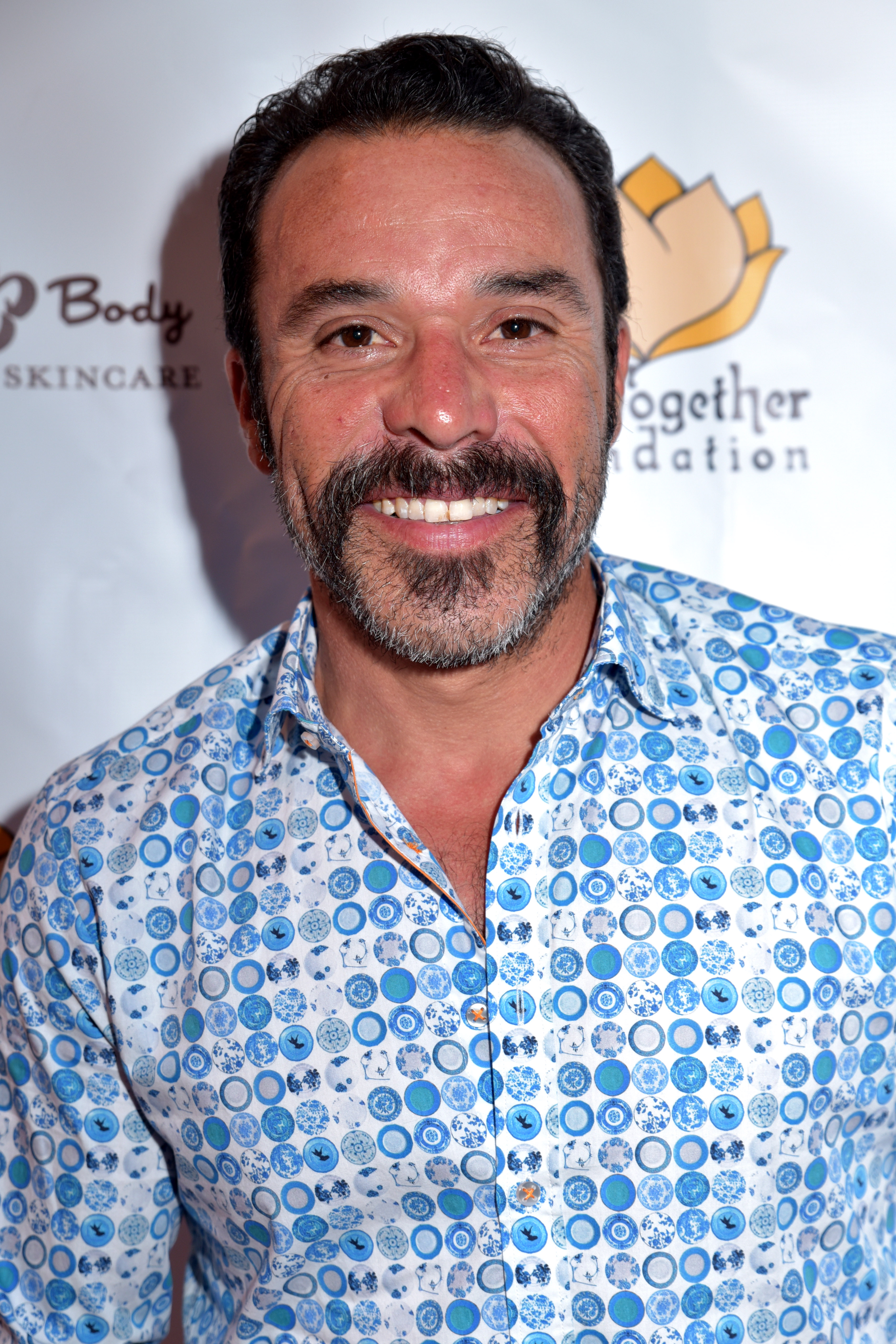
Michael Irby made his final appearance in the series, following his character's death.

Hader wanted Hank to "make some big moves to try to be a tough guy and it ends up getting Cristobal killed", which would result in the character's death in the episode. Hader was certain that Hank would never kill Cristobal, so the writers settled on a conflict that would evolve from Hank taking an important decision for both of them. Hader compared it to the death scene of Chris, explaining "I think he's gotta go, to make where the season goes, and where I wanted to see Hank go this season, he's got to make a massive mistake."

Actor Michael Irby commented on the decision, "as much as I was heartbroken about it, I knew it was something that kind of had to happen." He considered that Cristobal's relationship with Hank was damaged from the start, saying "it was always going to be broken. Our human nature fights for hope and love — I think that's what propelled that." Anthony Carrigan commented, "I hope that audience members will be understanding that all these things were tracking. [...] So Hank was left with a really tough decision. Do I continue with this kind of vulnerable way of doing things, or do I harden up and choose him and Cristobal over this dream that they both had? I think ultimately that hardening was ultimately the wrong choice, so it's really tragic in a certain way. But I think it's also very beautiful and very compelling storytelling."

The final scene was confirmed to be a time jump by Hader. The idea was conceived while writing the season, with Hader questioning "What would happen if all these characters got what they wanted?" In this case, he wanted to explore Barry's recurring daydreams throughout the series, something he always wanted. Commenting on Sally's decision, Sarah Goldberg explained, "Barry is the one place she can go where she's going to feel seen, loved, heard and free of all of this humiliation and trauma. She wanted to be Meryl Streep. She wanted to be an actress who was taken seriously, and anything else can't play substitute. She'd rather run away with Barry, which is so sad."

=== Casting ===
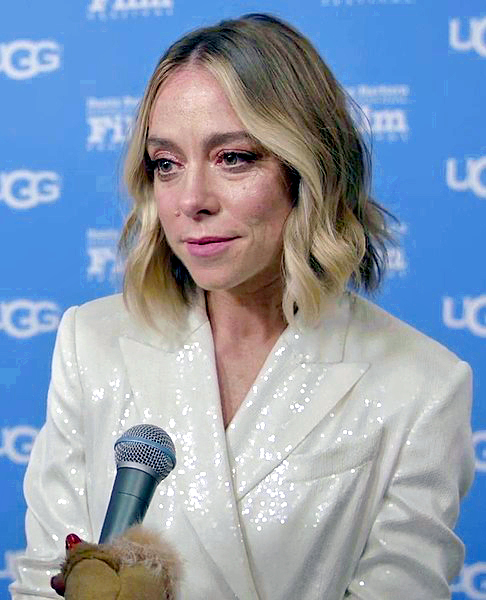
Sian Heder guest starred in the episode as herself.

The episode featured an appearance by filmmaker Sian Heder, who played herself in the episode. Her appearance was inspired by a phenomenon where, as Hader describes, "you do a little prestige movie that wins awards, and then Hollywood opens up the gates for you, and then you get 'Mega Girls 4'." Matt Schimkowitz, writing for The A.V. Club, specifically identified Heder's role as parodying Chloé Zhao, who directed the critically acclaimed Nomadland (which won the Academy Award for Best Picture the year before Heder's CODA) before later directing the less well-received Eternals for Marvel Studios. Heder was skeptical of appearing, but accepted after reading possible scenarios for her appearance.

Paul McCrane's casting dates back to when he auditioned for the role of Fuches: both he and Patrick Fischler, who played Lon in the first three episodes of the season, gave impressive reads for Fuches, to the point that casting director Sherry Thomas would come back to Hader at the start of each season to ask if there was a role they could give the two actors.

=== Filming ===
For the sand room sequence, the series' production designer, Eric Schoonover, created a giant room, which became the series' biggest built set. It was two stories high, with a contraption underneath the set that could be opened, which Hader described as "an hourglass membrane thing" where the stunt performers could fall. After most of the characters fell on the sand, the crew assembled a special box for Michael Irby to enter, which would also be covered in sand. According to Irby, "it wasn't sand — they were ground corn husks, and so they were much lighter than sand." The sequence included a shot of Hank pulling Cristobal out of the sand, but Hader felt that it "looked like an action movie" and decided to jump to Cristobal already out.

The shot of the silhouette at the cabin was the final scene to be filmed for the original photography of the series, not counting reshoots.

== Reception ==
=== Ratings ===
The episode was watched by 0.303 million viewers, earning a 0.08 in the 18-49 rating demographics on the Nielson ratings scale. This means that 0.08 percent of all households with televisions watched the episode. This was a 45% increase from the previous episode, which was watched by 0.208 million viewers with a 0.03 in the 18-49 demographics.

=== Critical reception ===
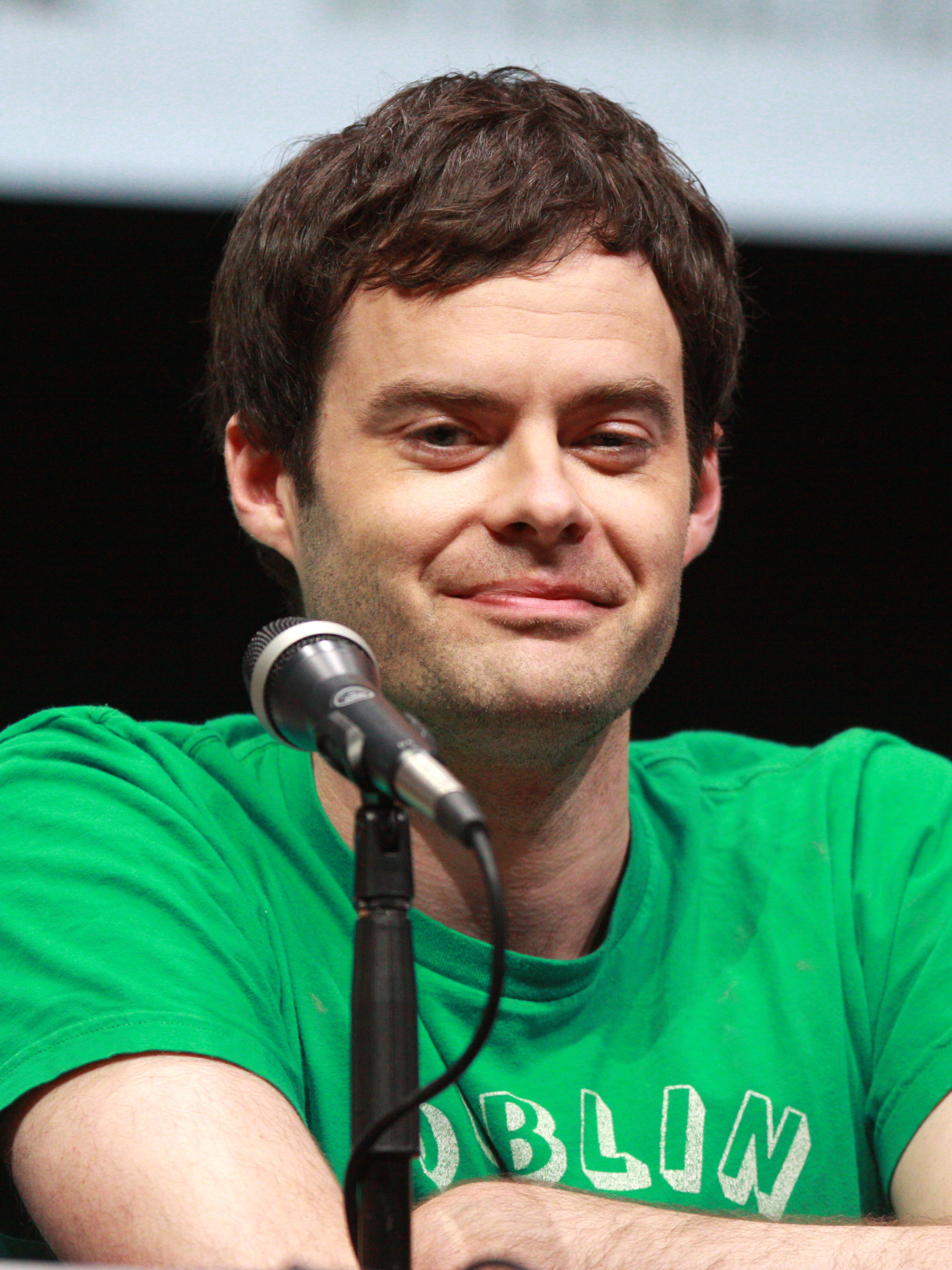
Bill Hader received critical praise for his directing and his character's limited screentime.

"it takes a psycho" received universal acclaim from critics. On the review aggregator Rotten Tomatoes, it holds an approval rating of 100% based on 6 reviews, with an average rating of 9.7/10. Matt Schimkowitz of The A.V. Club gave the episode an "A" and wrote, "The sound of helicopters makes up most of the background noise on this week's stellar episode of Barry, a show without a titular character, at least for these 30 minutes. Yet, the whirling blades serve as a reminder that the one hitman at the center of everyone's personality crises is out there, evading the cops and on the hunt, coming for one of his former friends. Well, everyone but Fuches, whose lips are sealed shut with bruises thanks to the batons of his prison guards."

Alan Sepinwall of Rolling Stone wrote, "in the moment that I first watched this one, my jaw was on the floor. Whether real or imaginary — or another journey to the Underworld — this did not seem to be where Barry and Sally's story was going. Barry was missing, and now he is... somewhere, at some time. Buckle up for what comes next." Ben Rosenstock of Vulture gave the episode a perfect 5 star rating out of 5 and wrote, "While Bill Hader's proclivity for tight, ruthlessly efficient storytelling is mostly an asset on this show, sometimes his more ambitious character arcs could use a little more time to percolate. All of that is truer than ever in 'It Takes a Psycho,' an episode that lurches forward in every storyline, racing ahead to a truly wild conclusion. And yet... it's hard to argue with the result when the lurching is as thrilling and devastating as this."

Steve Greene of IndieWire gave the episode an "A–" and wrote, "After putting Barry's psyche front and center for the first three episodes, 'It Takes a Psycho' is an episode-long misdirect. Barry's hardly there but he casts a long shadow, especially in how his manipulative ways seem to have transferred to Hank. But Barry is just fine even without Barry." Josh Spiegel of /Film wrote, "'it takes a psycho' does an excellent job of creating a mid-season cliffhanger of sorts for many of its characters, and one that we're presumably going to get resolved with whatever future state is the case for them all."

Several critics also praised the performance of Anthony Carrigan. Greene wrote that "Carrigan [has] always been so precise in showing the vacant stare of someone who knows trouble is on the horizon." Schimkowitz said that Carrigan, along with Michael Irby, "have such a strong foundation for their characters" and wrote, "Carrigan is a raw nerve here, a man who has lost everything and has no one to blame it on but himself. It's a beautiful and crushing scene for which Carrigan and Irby deserve all the praise in the world. It's a brutal end to a lovely romance. But sandcastles aren't meant to last forever." Furthermore, he also declared Carrigan's performance worthy of an Emmy. Rosenstock noted that "Carrigan plays Hank's backtracking perfectly, like he'll do and say anything to keep Cristobal from leaving him and dooming himself." Spiegel called Carrigan's performance, in addition to Sarah Goldberg's, "brilliant."

IndieWire named "it takes a psycho" the best TV episode of 2023. In addition, The Hollywood Reporter, Looper and Mashable also named it one of the best episodes of the year.

=== Accolades ===
TVLine named Anthony Carrigan as an honorable mention as the "Performer of the Week" for the week of May 6, 2023, for his performance in the episode. The site wrote, "Hoo boy... this was a rough week on Barry, with Sally and Gene facing painful life crises. But no one was put through the wringer more than our beloved goofball NoHo Hank, and Anthony Carrigan expertly stripped away the Chechen gangster's silly façade to expose the cold calculations at his core. Hank murdered his new allies to realign with the Chechens, and Carrigan was horrifyingly precise as Hank explained to Cristobal exactly why their deaths were necessary. But Carrigan did let Hank's emotions show when Cristobal walked out on him, with Hank begging him to stay and then breaking into jagged sobs when he refused and Hank's men had to take him out. It was devastating to see Hank go to the dark side like that, but Carrigan absolutely wowed us with his ability to turn a court jester into a malevolent prince."

Carrigan submitted the episode to support his nomination for Outstanding Supporting Actor in a Comedy Series at the 75th Primetime Emmy Awards.
