= Travis Warech =

American basketball player (born 1991)

Travis Warech טרוויס ווריק
Free Agent
- Position: Shooting guard / small forward

Personal information
- Born: July 5, 1991 (age 35) Pine Brook, New Jersey, U.S.
- Listed height: 6 ft 4 in (1.93 m)
- Listed weight: 195 lb (88 kg)

Career information
- High school: Montville (Montville, New Jersey)
- College: Saint Michael's (2009–2012); Ithaca (2012–2013)
- NBA draft: 2013: undrafted
- Playing career: 2013–present

Career history
- 2013–2014: Rockets Gotha
- 2014–2015: Riesen Ludwigsburg
- 2015: Hamburg Towers
- 2015–2017: Rasta Vechta
- 2017–2018: Maccabi Ashdod
- 2018–2019: Hapoel Be'er Sheva
- 2019–2020: Ironi Nahariya
- 2020–2022: Hapoel Be'er Sheva
- 2022: Hapoel Tel Aviv

Career highlights
- Second-team All-Empire 8 (2013)

Travis Warech (Hebrew: טרוויס ווריק; born July 5, 1991) is an American professional basketball player who last played for Hapoel Tel Aviv of the Israeli Basketball Premier League. He played college basketball for Saint Michael's and Ithaca, before playing professionally in Germany and Israel.

== Early life and college career ==
Warech was born and raised in the Pine Brook section of Montville, New Jersey, and is Jewish. Warech attended Montville Township High School, where he was a three-year letter winner for the Mustangs. Warech was named team MVP and served as team captain during his junior and senior seasons.

Warech played college basketball for the Saint Michael's College's Purple Knights and the Ithaca College's Bombers. In his senior year at Ithaca, he averaged 16 points, 8 rebounds, 1.3 assists, and 1.2 steals per game. He earned a spot on the All-Empire 8 Second Team.

== Professional career ==
=== Germany (2013–2017) ===
On October 18, 2013, Warech started his professional career with BiG Oettinger Rockets Gotha of the German ProA. On April 8, 2014, Warech recorded a career-high 24 points, shooting 8-of-12 from the field, along with three rebounds in a 90–80 win over Crailsheim Merlins. In 29 games played for Gotha, he averaged 10.0 points, 5.1 rebounds, 1.4 assists, and 1.0 steals per game.

On June 27, 2014, Warech signed a two-year deal with Riesen Ludwigsburg of the German BBL.

On October 29, 2015, Warech signed a one-year deal with Hamburg Towers, and he played seven games with the team. However, on December 9, 2015, he parted ways with Hamburg and joined Rasta Vechta for the rest of the season. Warech helped Rasta Vechta promote to the German BBL as the 2016 ProA Runner-up. In 26 games played during the 2015–16 season, he averaged 7.7 points and 3.5 rebounds per game, shooting 41.4 percent from 3-point range.

=== Israel (2017–present) ===
On August 15, 2017, Warech signed with the Israeli team Maccabi Ashdod for the 2017–18 season. On May 3, 2018, Warech recorded a season-high 19 points, along with three rebounds and two steals in an 85–65 blowout loss to Hapoel Jerusalem. Warech helped Ashdod reach the 2018 Israeli League Playoffs, where they eventually were eliminated by Hapoel Tel Aviv in the Quarterfinals.

On June 20, 2018, Warech signed a one-year deal with Hapoel Be'er Sheva. On April 7, 2019, Warech recorded a season-high 21 points, shooting 7-of-12 from the three-point range, along with three assists in a 97–88 loss to Maccabi Ashdod. Warech helped Be'er Sheva reach the 2019 Israeli League Playoffs, where they eventually were eliminated by Hapoel Jerusalem in the Quarterfinals. In 29 games played for Be'er Sheva, he averaged 8.5 points and 2.7 rebounds, shooting 42.6 percent from three-point range.

On June 19, 2019, Warech signed with Ironi Nahariya for the 2019–20 season. He averaged 7.6 points per game. On July 28, 2020, Warech returned to Hapoel Be'er Sheva.

On July 14, 2022, he has signed with Hapoel Tel Aviv of the Israeli Basketball Premier League.

== Maccabiah Games ==
In July 2017, Warech participated in the 2017 Maccabiah Games and helped the USA Men's basketball team win the tournament and earn a gold medal. He played on the team with among others Jordan Cohen and Sam Singer.
