= Forgiving jeff =

"forgiving jeff"
- Barry episode
- Episode no.: Season 3 Episode 1
- Directed by: Bill Hader
- Written by: Alec Berg; Bill Hader
- Cinematography by: Carl Herse
- Editing by: Franky Guttman
- Original air date: April 24, 2022
- Running time: 29 minutes

Guest appearances
- Elizabeth Perkins as TV producer; D'Arcy Carden as Natalie Greer; Michael Irby as Cristobal Sifuentes; Jessy Hodges as Lindsay Mandel; Andrew Leeds as Leo Cousineau; Nick Gracer as Yandal; Turhan Troy Caylak as Akhmal; JB Blanc as Batir; Elsie Fisher as Katie; Gary Kraus as Chief Krauss; Marika Domińczyk as Anna; Cullen Douglas as Charles; Todd Weeks as Jeff; Joanna Sotomura as Casey

Episode chronology
← Previous "berkman ﹥ block"	Next → "limonada"

"forgiving jeff" is the first episode of the third season of the American crime tragicomedy television series Barry. It is the 17th overall episode of the series and was written by series co-creators Alec Berg and Bill Hader, and directed by Hader, who also serves as the main lead actor. It was first broadcast on HBO in the United States on April 24, 2022, and also was available on HBO Max on the same date.

The series follows Barry Berkman, a hitman from Cleveland who travels to Los Angeles to kill someone but finds himself joining an acting class taught by Gene Cousineau, where he meets aspiring actress Sally Reed and begins to question his path in life as he deals with his criminal associates such as Monroe Fuches and NoHo Hank. In the episode, Barry now works as a hitman in the dark web, experiencing some severe hallucinations and frustrations with his next moves. Meanwhile, Gene now knows that Barry killed Moss and intends to do anything to make him pay.

According to Nielsen Media Research, the episode was seen by an estimated 0.249 million household viewers and gained a 0.04 ratings share among adults aged 18–49. The episode received critical acclaim, with critics praising the writing, directing, performances, pace, character development and revelations. Anthony Carrigan submitted the episode to support his 2022 Emmy nomination for Outstanding Supporting Actor in a Comedy Series.

== Plot ==
In the outskirts of LA, Barry (Bill Hader) is frustrated when a man constantly changes his plans for how to brutally kill Jeff, a man who slept with his wife. When the man decides to forgive Jeff after receiving an apology, a disillusioned Barry kills them both.

Detective Mae Dunn (Sarah Burns) interrogates Hank (Anthony Carrigan) to question him about the shootout at the monastery and Moss's corpse, as the Chechen mafia pin Barry left on Moss and surveillance at the monastery link the two. Hank points to Fuches (Stephen Root) as the killer, but lies that he is a Chechen hitman named "The Raven". Meanwhile, Fuches is revealed to be at a guarded cabin in Chechnya while the situation calms down. Gene (Henry Winkler) has closed the acting class and tells police that Barry was involved in all the recent tragic events, but is not believed.

Sally (Sarah Goldberg) now stars in and writes for her own TV series, Joplin, a family drama about abuse, although some network executives are still unconvinced about the angle the series is going for. Barry, who took a job on the dark web to kill a woman's husband, visits Sally on set and hallucinates Sally being shot by an unseen shooter. Furthermore, Barry and Sally's relationship is shown to have become lifeless, with Barry becoming more aggressive and sullen playing video games and doing ersatz hits instead of acting, while Sally's priorities now mostly focus on her show.

Barry visits Hank, who is living with and dating Cristobal (Michael Irby). Barry asks for work, citing his struggle, but Hank refuses, unwilling to cooperate with him after the events at the monastery. Gene schedules a meeting with Barry and bids farewell to Leo (Andrew Leeds) and his grandson, the former of which is suspicious of his demeanor. Barry and Gene meet at the now closed theater, where Gene tries to kill Barry with a revolver, but spills the bullets after fumbling the revolving cylinder. Barry abducts Gene to the outskirts to kill him. Gene begs for his life saying that he has forgiven Barry, but Barry says forgiveness has to be earned and he cannot do that. Barry hesitates but then has an idea, telling Gene to get into the trunk.

== Production ==
=== Development ===
In April 2022, the episode's title was revealed as "forgiving jeff" and it was announced that series co-creators Alec Berg and Bill Hader had written the episode while Hader had directed it. This was Berg's seventh writing credit, Hader's seventh writing credit, and Hader's sixth directing credit.

=== Writing ===
The episode featured Gene Cousineau confronting Barry about Moss's murder. Bill Hader felt that the episode had to end with both characters aware of the other character's actions, intending to change the series' formula, "I think by doing that, it kind of made us look at all the characters differently. Not looking at how we had done it the first few seasons with them." Henry Winkler said that the scene was intended to portray Gene in complete control even when his plan falls apart, further adding that "if push came to shove, I would definitely have killed Barry."

The opening scene diverged from Hader's original idea. The scene would have taken place in a gas station parking lot, with Barry meeting with a man who wanted his wife murdered. However, Barry kills the man, as the wife contacted him first to kill him. Hader liked the scene but felt that it didn't connect with the main theme of the episode, forgiveness.

=== Filming ===
The episode features a long take where the camera follows Sally as she walks through the set of her series, Joplin. Hader noted he wanted the scene to communicate the scope of Sally's new life and responsibilities, saying, "I just felt that you could see a lot of oners and people do oners for the sake of being a oner, and I just wanted it to tell a story. My favorite oners have an emotional component to it or the idea of seeing it in real time enhances something."

== Reception ==
=== Viewers ===
The episode was watched by 0.249 million viewers, earning a 0.04 in the 18-49 rating demographics on the Nielson ratings scale. This means that 0.04 percent of all households with televisions watched the episode. This was a massive 89% decrease from the previous episode, which was watched by 2.21 million viewers with a 0.9 in the 18-49 demographics.

=== Critical reviews ===
"forgiving jeff" received critical acclaim. The review aggregator website Rotten Tomatoes reported a 100% approval rating for the episode, based on 8 reviews with an average rating of 9.5/10.

David Cote of The A.V. Club gave the episode an "A" and wrote, "Forgiveness must be earned. But wait, does it? Or will Barry, unable to forgive himself, in the quest to earn forgiveness, make things even worse? All we know is, season 3 is off to one hell of a start, the stakes are higher than ever, and no one is safe."

Alan Sepinwall of Rolling Stone wrote, "A series with such a precarious high-concept as Barry should have no business being better in its third season than it was in its first. Yet it is. By the end of the final screener HBO gave critics, I could not imagine how the show would attempt to keep the story going for a potential fourth season, let alone beyond that. But I now desperately want to see Hader and friends try."

Miles Surrey of The Ringer wrote, "Killing for hire and show business seems like an odd pairing, but Barry has expertly wedded these professions and the self-delusion required to navigate them successfully. Whether it's a hitman with a history of turning to violence to solve all his problems thinking he can be absolved of his sins or a showrunner charging along with a series that stretches the truth of her history with abuse, Barry continues to shine a light on damaged characters who refuse to look at themselves in the mirror. The results haven't been pretty going into Season 3, but as is true to Tinseltown, the show must go on." Nick Harley of Den of Geek gave the episode a 4.5 star rating out of 5 and wrote, "'Forgiving Jeff' is a packed half-hour that runs the gamut of emotions and effectively catches the audience up after a three-year hiatus. There's no telling what Barry has planned, or what's going to happen with Fuches, who's been living off the grid in the Chechen Mountains, but this series moves with such confidence at every turn that I can rest assured that every reveal will be unexpected yet earned. Barry is clearly going for a darker tone this year, and the titular character's violent past will be rearing its head more often, but its admirable that the show can still find ways to deliver out-loud laughs. We've missed Barry; let's never go that long without it again."

=== Accolades ===
Anthony Carrigan submitted the episode to support his nomination for Outstanding Supporting Actor in a Comedy Series at the 74th Primetime Emmy Awards.
