= 2017 Maccabiah Games =

20th edition of Jewish multi-sport event

20th Maccabiah
- Host city: Jerusalem, Israel
- Nations: 85
- Athletes: 10,000
- Events: 45 sports
- Opening: 6 July 2017
- Closing: 17 July 2017
- Opened by: Reuven Rivlin
- Torchbearer: Anthony Ervin
- Main venue: Teddy Stadium

The 2017 Maccabiah Games (Hebrew: משחקי המכביה 2017), also referred to as the 20th Maccabiah Games (Hebrew: המכביה ה-20), were the 20th edition of the Maccabiah Games. They took place from 4 to 17 July 2017, in Israel. The Maccabiah Games are open to Jewish athletes from around the world, and to all Israeli citizens regardless of their religion. A total of 10,000 athletes competed, a Maccabiah Games record, making the 2017 Maccabiah Games the third-largest sporting competition in the world (after the Olympics and the FIFA World Cup). The athletes were from 85 countries, also a record. Countries represented for the first time included the Bahamas, Barbados, Cambodia, the Cayman Islands, Haiti, Malta, Morocco, the Philippines, Singapore, South Korea, and Trinidad (according to the official Games website Morocco debuted in 2013, and it does not list The Bahamas, Cambodia, Haiti, Malta, the Philippines, or Trinidad among participating nations). The athletes competed in 45 sports.

== History ==
The Maccabiah Games were first held in 1932. In 1961, they were declared a "Regional Sports Event" by, and under the auspices and supervision of, the International Olympic Committee. Among other Olympic and world champions, swimmer Mark Spitz won 10 Maccabiah gold medals before earning his first of nine Olympic gold medals.

== Opening ceremonies ==
On 6 July 2017, the opening ceremonies took place at Teddy Stadium in Jerusalem, with 10,000 competitors in front of 30,000 spectators. Seven athletes took part in the torch lighting ceremony: Olympic gold-medal-winner swimmers American Anthony Ervin and Frenchman Fabien Gilot, Olympic medalists in judo Ori Sasson and Yarden Gerbi, three-time Olympic gymnast Neta Rivkin, NBA player Omri Casspi, and Paralympic world champion rower Moran Samuel. Ervin was honored as the final torchbearer, lighting the Maccabiah flame.

The delegation march took place before Israeli President Reuven Rivlin, Prime Minister Benjamin Netanyahu, and others. British Prime Minister Theresa May and Canadian Prime Minister Justin Trudeau spoke to the crowd by means of pre-recorded videos.

Canadian ice hockey player Avi Steinberg proposed to his girlfriend Rachel on stage, and then married her under a chuppah on stage minutes later. Noa Tishby served as the host of the opening ceremonies. Singers who performed included Lior Narkis, Ester Rada, Omer Adam, Victoria Hanna, and Marina Maximillian.

== Notable competitors ==
American three-time Olympic champion swimmer Anthony Ervin won gold medals in the 50-meter freestyle (with a time of 22.05 seconds), the 100-meter freestyle (with a time of 49.76 seconds), and the 4 × 100 m medley relay (with the Americans clocking 3:41.82). American B. J. Johnson won gold medals in the men's 100m breaststroke, with a time of 1:01.27 (a new Maccabiah record), as well as in the 200m breaststroke, with a time of 2:11.60. In the special 4x50m relay race between Israeli and American all-star teams, American Olympic champions Lenny Krayzelburg (four Olympic golds), Jason Lezak (four Olympic golds), and Ervin, with masters swimmer Alex Blavatnik, swam a time of 1:48.23 and defeated Israeli Olympians Guy Barnea, Yoav Bruck, Eran Groumi, and Tal Stricker, who had a time of 1:51.25. American Jessica Antiles won the silver medal in the 400m individual medley and a bronze medal in the 200m individual medley.

In soccer, Sam Raben and Jake Rozhansky were part of Team USA's gold medal winning team. Josh Kennet won a silver medal with Great Britain in soccer. Ilan Boccara played for France, which came in 7th, Alon Abelski played for Germany, and David Cuperman played for Colombia. Israeli soccer player Shani David scored a goal in the final for Israel as it beat Team USA to win a gold medal in women's soccer. Australian Melissa Maizels competed in soccer.

Team USA won a gold medal in basketball with among others Jordan Cohen, Sam Singer, and Travis Warech, as they were coached by Doug Gottlieb.

In fencing, American Olympic fencer Eli Dershwitz, former junior world champion and ranked #1 in the world the following year, won individual and team gold medal in sabre.

Canadian Olympian Josh Binstock and his partner won the gold medal in men's beach volleyball. Cricketer Zac Elkin won a gold medal with Team South Africa, and cricketer Mark Bott won a silver medal with Great Britain.

Israeli-American Olympic swimmer Andrea Murez (competing now as an Israeli having moved to Israel in 2014) won the women's 100m freestyle, with a time of 55.15 seconds, and set a new Games record as she also won the 200m freestyle in 1:59.80. Israeli Olympic swimmer Keren Siebner won the 200m butterfly with a time of 2:16.57. Israeli Olympic swimmer Amit Ivry (59.37) and Siebner (1:00.01) won the gold and silver medals in the women's 100m butterfly. Ivry, Siebner, Shahar Menahem, and Or Tamir set an Israeli national record in the women's 4 × 100 m medley relay with a time of 4:11.67 as they won a silver medal. Israeli Olympian and former European Junior Swimming Champion in the 100m backstroke Yakov Toumarkin won the men's 200m backstroke in a time of 2:00.17. Israeli swimmer Bar Soloveychik also competed at the Games.

In track, Canadian Pan American Games medalist Sasha Gollish won gold medals in the 800m, 1,500m, and 5,000m events, and was named Female Athlete of the Games. Diana Vaisman of Israel set the Games record in the 100 m dash with a time of 11.71, winning a gold medal. Israeli javelin thrower Marharyta Dorozhon won the women's competition with a throw of 63.07m, qualifying her for the 2017 World Championships in Athletics. Israeli future Olympic marathon runner Gashau Ayale won a silver medal in the 5,000 metre race.

Israeli Olympic judoka Gili Cohen won the gold medal in the under-57 kg judo event. Israeli Olympian Misha Zilberman won a gold medal in badminton mixed doubles, and Israeli Ksenia Polikarpova won a gold medal in badminton.

Israeli individual rhythmic gymnast Linoy Ashram, the 2015 Rhythmic Gymnastics Grand Prix all-around silver medalist, won all five gold medals (the all-around, ball, ribbon, hoop, and clubs). Israeli artistic gymnast Artem Dolgopyat won two gold medals in the floor exercise and pommel horse, and a bronze medal in the vault, and Israeli gymnast Andrey Medvedev won three bronze medals. Israeli future Olympian and European Championships bronze medalist gymnast Lihie Raz won the gold medal in floor. Israeli gymnast Ofir Netzer won a gold medal in the vault.

Israeli Daniel Poleshchuk won a gold medal in Men's Open Squash. 2013 World Women's Chess Champion Anna Ushenina of Ukraine won a silver medal in the second grandmasters group, which was won by Israeli grandmaster Tal Baron, in a field that included Israeli champion grandmaster Victor Mikhalevski. German grandmaster Georg Meier won the main Grandmaster tournament, ahead of Ukrainian grandmaster and former European champion Alexander Moiseenko.

Canadian Anthony Housefather won five medals (three silver medals and two bronze medals) in a number of Masters (35+) swimming events.

Zack Test, with Shawn Lipman as head coach, represented the United States in rugby union, and won a bronze medal.

== Participating countries ==
The Maccabiah Games are open to Jewish athletes from around the world, and to all Israeli citizens regardless of their religion. Some delegations have more relaxed rules about participation; for example, the Brazil junior football team included Ronald, the son of former three-time FIFA World Player of the Year Ronaldo, who is not Jewish, but has been a member of the Jewish football club Hebraica for years.

The athletes were from a record 85 countries. Countries represented for the first time include the Bahamas, Cambodia, the Cayman Islands, Haiti, Malta, Morocco, the Philippines, Singapore, South Korea, and Trinidad (according to the official Web site of the Games, Morocco debuted in 2013, official Web site of the Games does not list Malta or Trinidad among participating nations) A total of 10,000 athletes competed, a Maccabiah Games record, making the 2017 Maccabiah Games the third-largest sporting competition in the world (after the Olympics and the FIFA World Cup).

Israel fielded the largest delegation, with 2,500 competitors led by Olympic windsurfer Maayan Davidovich. The US delegation of over 1,100 athletes came from over 42 states, and was the second-largest delegation. For Team USA, Olympians Eli Dershwitz (fencing), Anthony Ervin (swimming), and Zach Test (rugby 7's) competed, and Olympic gold medalists and Maccabiah Games alumni Lenny Krayzelburg and Jason Lezak joined the team as Maccabi Ambassadors, and swam two exhibition relays. The Argentinian, Australian, and Canadian delegations each had approximately 650 athletes, Brazil's delegation had 491 members, and Great Britain was represented by 375 competitors.

The following countries sent delegations to the 2017 Maccabiah Games; numbers in parentheses indicate number of competitors:

- Albania (3)
- Argentina (650)
- Australia (650)
- Austria
- Azerbaijan
- Barbados (2)
- Belarus
- Belgium
- Bolivia (5)
- Brazil (491)
- Canada (650)
- Cayman Islands (4)
- Chile
- China
- Colombia
- Costa Rica
- Cuba
- Curaçao
- Czech Republic
- Denmark
- Dominican Republic (1)
- El Salvador
- Finland
- France
- Georgia
- Germany
- Gibraltar (20)
- Great Britain (375)
- Greece
- Guatemala
- Holland (60, including medical staff and board)
- Honduras
- Hong Kong
- Hungary
- India (30)
- Ireland
- Israel (2,500)
- Italy (50)
- Jamaica (2)
- Japan
- Kazakhstan
- Kyrgyzstan
- Latvia
- Lithuania (28)
- Macedonia
- Mexico
- Moldova
- Morocco
- Nicaragua
- Norway
- Panama
- Paraguay
- Peru
- Poland
- Portugal
- Puerto Rico
- Russia
- Serbia
- Singapore
- Slovakia
- Slovenia
- South Africa
- South Korea
- Spain
- Suriname
- Sweden
- Switzerland
- Taiwan
- Thailand
- Turkey
- Ukraine
- United States (1,100+)
- Uruguay
- Uzbekistan
- Venezuela
- Vietnam
- MWU (1)
- EMC (9)

== Sports ==
Athletes at the Games competed in 45 sports, at 68 sports complexes throughout Israel. The Games recognize all Olympic sports. The sports with the greatest number of competitors were soccer (1,401 athletes from 20 countries), swimming (712 competitors from 34 countries), tennis (537 competitors from 35 countries), and basketball (466 competitors from 13 countries). The sporting events included:

- Aquatics
  - Swimming
  - Swimming (open water)
  - Swimming (paralympic)
  - Water Polo
- Archery
- Athletics
  - Half Marathon
  - Track and field
- Badminton
- Baseball
- Basketball
  - Basketball
  - Wheelchair basketball
- Bowling
  - Lawn Bowling
  - Ten Pin Bowling
- Bridge
- Chess
- Cricket
- Cycling
- Equestrian
- Fencing
- Field Hockey
- Football
  - Football
  - Futsal
- Golf
- Gymnastics
  - Artistic
  - Rhythmic
- Handball
- Ice Hockey
- Judo
- Karate
- Lacrosse
- Maccabi Men/Women
- Netball
- Rowing
- Rugby
  - Rugby 7s
  - Rugby 15s
- Softball
- Squash
- Table Tennis
- Taekwondo
- Tennis
  - Tennis
  - Wheelchair Tennis
- Triathlon
- Volleyball
  - Volleyball
  - Beach Volleyball
- Wrestling
  - Freestyle
  - Greco-Roman

== Medal count ==
Israel won the most medals, a total of 470 (173 gold medals, 150 silver, and 147 bronze). Team USA finished second with 164 medals (50 gold, 67 silver, and 47 bronze). Australia came in third (40; 9 gold, 19 silver, and 12 bronze), and Canada came in fourth (23; 10 gold, 6 silver, and 7 bronze). Hungary took fifth with 17 medals (6 gold, 7 silver, and 4 bronze).

South Africa came in sixth with 15 medals (9 gold, 1 silver, and 5 bronze). Tied for seventh with 14 medals were Germany (7 gold, 1 silver, and 6 bronze), Great Britain (4 gold, 5 silver, and 5 bronze), and Russia (1 gold, 2 silver, and 11 bronze). Ukraine came in 10th with 13 medals (3 gold, 8 silver, and 2 bronze), followed by France with 12 (3 gold, 5 silver, and 4 bronze).

=== Medals table for Open competition (Senior; 291 gold) ===
59 countries; 30 countries won medals.

Rank	Nation	Gold	Silver	Bronze	Total
1	Israel*	173	150	147	470
2	United States	50	67	47	164
3	Canada	10	6	7	23
4	Australia	9	19	12	40
5	South Africa	9	1	5	15
6	Germany	7	1	6	14
7	Hungary	6	7	4	17
8	Great Britain	4	5	5	14
9	Ukraine	3	8	2	13
10	France	3	5	4	12
11	Argentina	3	2	3	8
11	Brazil	3	2	3	8
13	Mexico	2	1	3	6
14	Netherlands	2	1	1	4
15	Poland	2	0	0	2
16	Russia	1	2	11	14
17	Switzerland	1	1	1	3
18	Georgia	1	1	0	2
19	Latvia	1	0	2	3
20	Spain	1	0	0	1
21	Czech Republic	0	2	2	4
22	Venezuela	0	2	1	3
23	Italy	0	1	2	3
24	Bolivia	0	1	0	1
24	Kazakhstan	0	1	0	1
26	Uruguay	0	0	2	2
27	China	0	0	1	1
27	Ireland	0	0	1	1
27	Lithuania	0	0	1	1
27	Slovenia	0	0	1	1
Totals (30 entries)		291	286	274	851

- Source: maccabiah.com

=== Medals table for Masters competition ===
Rank	Nation	Gold	Silver	Bronze	Total
1	Israel*	117	150	139	406
2	United States	29	18	20	67
3	Argentina	16	12	16	44
4	Australia	11	13	46	70
5	Venezuela	6	3	4	13
6	Brazil	5	12	11	28
7	Canada	4	7	22	33
8	Uruguay	3	2	2	7
9	South Africa	2	5	4	11
10	Austria	2	2	2	6
11	Germany	2	1	6	9
12	Great Britain	2	1	3	6
13	Costa Rica	1	1	1	3
13	Peru	1	1	1	3
15	Puerto Rico	1	0	2	3
16	Russia	1	0	1	2
16	Ukraine	1	0	1	2
18	Finland	1	0	0	1
19	Hong Kong	0	3	3	6
20	Mexico	0	2	0	2
21	Curaçao	0	1	2	3
22	Azerbaijan	0	1	0	1
22	Chile	0	1	0	1
Totals (23 entries)		205	236	286	727

- Source: maccabiah.com

=== Medals table for Junior competition ===
Rank	Nation	Gold	Silver	Bronze	Total
1	Israel*	91	88	77	256
2	United States	53	25	27	105
3	Brazil	5	3	3	11
4	Argentina	3	5	2	10
5	Australia	3	3	15	21
6	Great Britain	2	7	6	15
7	South Africa	1	7	1	9
8	Russia	1	4	0	5
9	Mexico	1	2	2	5
10	Ukraine	1	2	1	4
11	Hungary	1	2	0	3
12	Cuba	1	0	1	2
13	Latvia	1	0	0	1
13	Spain	1	0	0	1
13	Turkey	1	0	0	1
16	Canada	0	3	9	12
17	Germany	0	2	2	4
18	France	0	2	1	3
19	Lithuania	0	2	0	2
20	Netherlands	0	1	1	2
21	Japan	0	1	0	1
21	Switzerland	0	1	0	1
23	Barbados	0	0	1	1
23	Poland	0	0	1	1
Totals (24 entries)		166	160	150	476

- Source: maccabiah.com

=== Medals table for Para competition ===
Rank	Nation	Gold	Silver	Bronze	Total
1	Israel*	9	9	10	28
2	Brazil	2	0	0	2
3	Russia	1	0	0	1
4	Australia	0	0	7	7
5	Hungary	0	0	1	1
5	United States	0	0	1	1
Totals (6 entries)		12	9	19	40

- Source: maccabiah.com

== Closing ceremony ==
The closing ceremony in Latrun, between Tel Aviv and Jerusalem, on July 17, 2017, was hosted by Bar Refaeli. Refaeli presented Canadian Pan American Games medalist Sasha Gollish, who won three gold medals in track, with the Female Athlete of the Games Award. Israeli Minister of Culture and Sport Miri Regev passed the Maccabiah torch to a number of Maccabiah athletes.

== See also ==
- Sport in Israel
