= Jordan Cohen =

American-Israeli basketball player

Jordan Cohen ג'ורדן כהן
No. 15 – Ironi Kiryat Ata
- Position: Point guard
- League: Israeli Basketball Premier League

Personal information
- Born: July 31, 1997 (age 29) Tarzana, California, U.S.
- Listed height: 6 ft 2 in (1.88 m)
- Listed weight: 185 lb (84 kg)

Career information
- High school: Campbell Hall (Los Angeles, California)
- College: Lehigh (2016–2020)
- NBA draft: 2020: undrafted
- Playing career: 2020–present

Career history
- 2020: Maccabi Haifa
- 2020–2022: Maccabi Ashdod
- 2022–2023: Maccabi Ma'ale Adumim
- 2023–2026: Maccabi Ironi Ramat Gan
- 2026–present: Ironi Kiryat Ata

Career highlights
- Israeli Basketball Premier League Sixth Man of the Year (2024); Liga Leumit champion (2023); Second-team All-Patriot League (2020); Third-team All-Patriot League (2019)
Medals
Representing United States
Men's basketball
Maccabiah Games
Gold medal – first place	2017 Israel	Team

Jordan Cohen (Hebrew: ג'ורדן כהן; born July 31, 1997) is an American-Israeli professional basketball player for Ironi Kiryat Ata of the Israeli Basketball Premier League. He plays the point guard position.

Cohen played college basketball for Lehigh University, with whom he was Second-team All-Patriot League in 2020. He won a gold medal with Team USA at the 2017 Maccabiah Games. He was named 2024 Israeli Basketball Premier League Sixth Man of the Year.

== Early life ==
Cohen was born in Tarzana, California, and is Jewish. His hometown is North Hollywood, California. He is 6" 2" tall, and weighs 185 pounds.

== High school ==
Cohen attended Campbell Hall High School ('16) in Studio City, California. Playing for its basketball team, as a junior he averaged 11.5 points, 5.5 rebounds, and 4.5 assists per game. He was named First team All-CIF Division, and Daily News second team All-Area.

As a senior Cohen averaged 25 points,7 rebounds, and 5 assists per game. He was again named First team All-CIF Division, and was named first team All-Conference.

== Maccabiah Games ==
Cohen played basketball on Team USA in the 2017 Maccabiah Games, as the youngest player on the team. He averaged 6.2 points per game, as the team won the gold medal. He played on the team with among others Sam Singer and Travis Warech.

== College career ==
He attended and played basketball for Lehigh University, where Cohen majored in Finance ('20). Playing for the Lehigh Mountain Hawks as a freshman in 2016-17, in 29 games he averaged 21.4 minutes, 5.4 points,2.1 rebounds, and 2.1 assists per game, while shooting 45.8% from the field and 91.7% from the free throw line (2nd in the league).

Playing for the Mountain Hawks as a sophomore in 2017-18, in 29 games Cohen averaged 25.4 minutes, 9.3 points, 3.6 rebounds, 2.4 assists, and 0.9 steals per game, while shooting 48.3% from the field and 90.6% from the free throw line (6th in the league). He was named to the Academic All-Patriot League.

Playing for the team as a junior in 2018-19, in 31games he averaged 31.8 minutes,13.5 points, 3.8 rebounds, 3.6 assists (7th in the league), and 1.3 steals (7th) per game, while shooting 52.3% from the field, 47.5% from three-point range (3rd), and 86.4% from the free throw line (2nd). Cohen was team captain, was named Third-Team All-Patriot League, and was again named Academic All-Patriot League.

Playing for Lehigh as a senior in 2019-20, in 32games Cohen averaged 32.4 minutes, 14.2 points (10th in the league), 3.5 rebounds, 4.2 assists (4th), and 1.3 steals (7th) per game, while shooting 38.1% from three point range (sixth in the Patriot League) and 84.0% from the free throw line (2nd). He was again team captain, was named Second-Team All-Patriot League, and was again named Academic All-Patriot League.

== Professional career ==
=== Maccabi Haifa ===
In August 2020 Cohen signed a one-year contract with Maccabi Haifa, in the Israel Basketball Premier League. In 2020-21, he played three games for the team, in which in a total of 16 minutes he scored three points and grabbed one rebound, while making one steal.

=== Maccabi Ashdod ===
In November 2020, Cohen was released by Maccabi Haifa and signed with Maccabi Ashdod of the second-tier Liga Leumit, where he played during the 2020–21 and 2021–22 seasons.

=== Maccabi Ma'ale Adumim ===
Ahead of the 2022–23 campaign, he joined Maccabi Ma'ale Adumim, averaging 9.9 points and 2.0 assists per game.

=== Maccabi Ironi Ramat Gan ===
He then transferred in February 2023 to Maccabi Ironi Ramat Gan. He went on to win the 2022–23 Liga Leumit championship with Ramat Gan, earning promotion back to the Israeli Basketball Premier League.

In 2023, Cohen signed with Maccabi Ramat Gan. In 2023-24 with the team, he played 31 games in which he averaged 25.8 minutes, 11.4 points, 3.1 rebounds, 2.8 assists, and 0.9 steals, while shooting 47.7% from the field. He earned Israeli Basketball Premier League Sixth Man of the Year honors.

=== Israeli 3x3 Men's team ===
Cohen was a member of the Israeli 3x3 Open Men's team in June 2024, playing in Vienna, Austria. The Israeli team beat the teams from Austria and France, but lost to the team from the Netherlands in the quarter-finals.

In June 2024, Cohen suffered a torn anterior cruciate ligament while competing with the Israeli 3x3 national team. Despite his injury, Maccabi Ironi Ramat Gan signed Cohen to a two-year contract extension in September 2024 while he underwent rehabilitation. The injury ultimately sidelined him for the entirety of the 2024–25 and 2025–26 seasons.

=== Ironi Kiryat Ata ===
On July 12, 2026, he returned to the Israeli Basketball Premier League as a free agent, signing with Ironi Kiryat Ata for the 2026–27 season, and returned to competitive play on October 26, 2026—two years and four months after his injury.
