= Here I'm Alive =

2026 indie film

Here I'm Alive is a 2026 neo-realist urban epic directed by Joshua Z Weinstein, who co-wrote it with Brian Jon Perkins. Set in New York City, a collection of dreamers hustle their way through the city's digital underbelly. Starring a group of non-actors, Here I'm Alive shows their vivid lives over the span of one single night. Indiewire's David Ehrlich called the film "A microbudget ‘Magnolia’ for the Age of Hypernormalization". "Anchored by a dialed-in original soundtrack of internet-fried underground NYC music from BBY Goyard, Harto Falión, and Cooper B. Handy and spiritual jazz from Nate Mercereau and Carlos Niño, the film pulses with a rhythm that is unmistakably, defiantly New York."

== Premiere ==
Here I'm Alive premiered at Tribeca Film Festival on June 6th, 2026 under the US Narrative Competition. It went on to get the Special Jury Mention for Best U.S. Narrative Feature. The Jury stated: "One film stood out for diving deep into subcultures that are rarely explored. The film creates a series of sensitive portraits of people with unique points of view – alienation, loneliness, internet addiction, looksmaxxing, and desire for instant fame."

== Reception ==
In a review for Indie Wire, the score was described as "both lovingly intricate and all too easy to ignore" noting it "mesmerically combines a wealth of ambient noise" noting the score contained 20 original songs. The Nextbest Picture said "‘Here I’m Alive’ is as strong a cinematic city symphony as New York has seen in many a year."
