= Bikini Moon =

- Directed by: Milcho Manchevski
- Screenplay by: Milcho Manchevski; W.P. Rosenthal
- Story by: Milcho Manchevski
- Produced by: Anja Wedell; Munire Armstrong; Martin Warner
- Starring: Condola Rashad; Sarah Goldberg; Will Janowitz; Sathya Sridharan
- Cinematography: Joshua Z Weinstein
- Edited by: Ann Husaini
- Music by: Igor Vasilev Novogradska
- Release date: October 21, 2017 (São Paulo Film Festival)
- Language: English

Bikini Moon is a New York indie film directed by Milcho Manchevski and starring Condola Rashad, Sarah Goldberg, Will Janowitz, and newcomer Sathya Sridharan.

== Cast ==
- Condola Rashad as Bikini
- Sarah Goldberg as Kate
- Will Janowitz as Trevor
- Sathya Sridharan as Krishna
- Jeannine Kaspar as Leila
- Alexis Suarez as Deli Clerk
- Alex Kruz as Arresting Policeman
- Mykal-Michelle Harris as Ashley
- Cliff Moylan as Marc
- Chukwudi Iwuji as Adam
- Eugene Prokofiev as Igor
- Irungu Mutu as Mr. Wheatley
- Alyssa Cheatham as Alvina Wheatley
- Gemma Forbes as Ines
- Gregory Dann as Policeman
- Vladimir Bibic as Mr. Ilic
- Brian Sills as Bruno
- Henny Russell as City Clerk

== Production ==
Bikini Moon went into initial production in April 2016 in New York City, and wrapped filming in June 2016.

== Release ==
The film's premiere was at the 41st Mostra Internacional de Cinema São Paulo, Brazil. Its New York premiere was in October 2018.

== Reception ==
On the review aggregator website Rotten Tomatoes, 60% of 5 critics' reviews are positive. Metacritic, which uses a weighted average, assigned the film a score of 57 out of 100, based on 4 critics, indicating "mixed or average" reviews.

== Awards ==
- Tallgrass Film Festival - for Outstanding Female Actor
