= Drivers Wanted (2012 film) =

- Directed by: Joshua Z Weinstein
- Produced by: Jean Tsien, Joshua Z Weinstein
- Starring: Johnnie Spider Footman; Stanley Wissak; Eric Yin
- Music by: Adam Crystal
- Release date: 2012
- Running time: 54 minutes
- Language: English Mandarin Chinese

Drivers Wanted is a 2012 documentary film about 55 Stan, a New York City taxi depot in Queens, NY. It was directed by Joshua Z Weinstein and produced by Jean Tsien. As well as directing, Weinstein participated in the film, often riding in the passenger seat of the taxi.

The film features Johnnie Spider Footman, New York City's oldest taxi driver. Mr. Footman died on September 11, 2013. He was 94 years old.

The documentary was screened at the Silverdocs 2012 Film Festival. It also played at the Simons Center for the Arts as part of the Southern Circuit Tour of Independent Filmmakers and the reRun Gastropub. The film was also shown at the DOC NY film festival.
