= Menashe (film) =

- Theatrical release poster
- Yiddish: מנשה
- Directed by: Joshua Z. Weinstein
- Written by: Alex Lipschultz; Musa Syeed; Joshua Z. Weinstein
- Produced by: Alex Lipschultz; Traci Carlson; Joshua Z. Weinstein; Daniel Finkelman; Yoni Brook
- Starring: Menashe Lustig; Ruben Niborski; Yoel Weisshaus; Meyer Schwartz
- Cinematography: Yoni Brook; Joshua Z. Weinstein
- Edited by: Scott Cummings
- Music by: Aaron Martin; Dag Rosenqvist
- Distributed by: A24
- Release dates: January 23, 2017 (Sundance); July 28, 2017 (United States)
- Running time: 81 minutes
- Country: United States
- Languages: Yiddish; English
- Box office: $2 million

Menashe (Yiddish: מנשה) is a 2017 Yiddish-language American drama film directed by Joshua Z. Weinstein. It premiered at the Sundance Film Festival in January 2017, where it was acquired by A24 for U.S. distribution. The film was released in the United States on July 28, 2017.

== Premise ==
Menashe, a recently widowed Hasidic Jewish man, tries to regain custody of his ten-year-old son Rieven. Rieven is living with his aunt and uncle per a ruling by the Rabbi that Menashe must first remarry to provide a proper home for Rieven. Menashe's first marriage was unhappy, and he is reluctant to wed again. He works as a clerk in a grocery store with a difficult manager, and has a hard time earning enough money for himself. He doesn't wear the traditional black coat and top hat in public, though his son tells him he would look nice in one. Eizik, his successful brother-in-law, looks down on him. They argue in front of the Rabbi, who lets Rieven stay with Menashe for a week, until the upcoming memorial service for his wife, but reiterates the requirement for a two-parent home. Eizik wants the memorial meal in his finer home, but Menashe insists on having it in his shabby apartment. Getting a "bachelor-proof" recipe for kugel from a neighbor, Menashe puts the pan in the oven before going to the cemetery for the service. He and the participants, including the Rabbi, return to an apartment full of smoke. Eizik criticizes the burnt kugel, but the Rabbi praises it and insists the uncle eat a piece. Menashe begs Eizik to let Rieven live with him, but is told he must first find a wife. Menashe says he will see the matchmaker again. He goes to the ritual bath (mikvah), and dons a coat and top hat.

== Cast ==
- Menashe Lustig as Menashe
- Ruben Niborski as Rieven
- Yoel Weisshaus as Eizik
- Meyer Schwartz as Rabbi
- Hershy Fishman as Zalman

== Production ==
The plot of Menashe is loosely based on Lustig's life. In an interview with the Los Angeles Times he said that "unlike Menashe in the film, I'm not a schlimazel by nature. Maybe just a schlimazel by situation."

Customs and religious practices depicted include:

- a Lag BaOmer bonfire
- studying texts in the beth midrash
- a Farbrengen (celebratory gathering)
- Negel vasser - morning ritual, bedside hand washing.
- wearing the tallit katan undergarment
- wearing the rekel overcoat
- Mikvah, immersion in a ritual bath

The film was shot over the course of two years in Borough Park, Brooklyn, home to one of the largest Orthodox Jewish populations outside of Israel, a decision that Weinstein has said was motivated by a desire for authenticity. In an interview before the film's Sundance premiere, he said, "When I thought about making a film in Borough Park, in Yiddish, with real Hasidic Jews, to me, it was just as interesting as any documentary I ever made."

== Release ==
The film premiered on January 23, 2017, at the Sundance Film Festival. A trailer was released on April 19, featuring the song "Pashut" by Zusha. The film was released only on Blu-ray in the United States by A24, rather than Lions Gate, who usually handles their home entertainment distribution.

== Reception ==
=== Critical response ===
On Rotten Tomatoes, the film has an approval rating of 95% based on 118 reviews, with an average rating of 7.5/10. The website's critical consensus reads, "Menashe offers an intriguing look at a culture whose unfamiliarity to many viewers will be rendered irrelevant by the story's universally affecting themes and thoughtful approach." On Metacritic, the film has a weighted average score of 81 out of 100, based on 27 critics, indicating "universal acclaim".

In a glowing review, Clint Davis of WCPO-TV said it "might as well be a foreign film" for most American viewers, due to its setting and heavy use of Yiddish. He wrote that, despite this, it was "as universal as movies come." He praised Lustig's and Niborski's performances as charming.

=== Accolades ===
Award	Date of ceremony	Category	Recipient(s) and nominee(s)	Result	Ref.
Gotham Independent Film Awards	November 27, 2017	Bingham Ray Breakthrough Director Award	Joshua Z. Weinstein	Nominated	
Deauville American Film Festival	September 2017	Prix du Jury	Joshua Z. Weinstein	Won	
Deauville American Film Festival	September 2017	Grand Special Prize	Joshua Z. Weinstein	Nominated	
Independent Spirit Awards	March 3, 2018	Best First Feature	Menashe	Nominated	
