= Elaine Stritch: Shoot Me =

- Film poster
- Directed by: Chiemi Karasawa
- Produced by: Chiemi Karasawa; Elizabeth Hemmerdinger
- Starring: Elaine Stritch
- Cinematography: Shane Sigler; Joshua Z. Weinstein; Rod Lamborn
- Edited by: Kjerstin Rossi; Pax Wassermann
- Music by: Kristopher Bowers
- Distributed by: Sundance Selects
- Release dates: April 19, 2013 (Tribeca Film Festival); February 20, 2014 (United States)
- Running time: 81 minutes
- Country: United States
- Language: English
- Box office: $288,896

Elaine Stritch: Shoot Me is a 2013 American documentary film directed by Chiemi Karasawa about the life and career of Elaine Stritch. Alec Baldwin and Broadway producer Cheryl Wiesenfeld served as executive producers on the film. Karasawa and crew began filming Stritch in 2011, following her life at age 86. The film's theatrical release in February 2014 preceded Stritch's death that July.

== Subjects ==
In addition to Stritch, several close friends and collaborators appear in the film:

- Alec Baldwin
- Rob Bowman
- Tina Fey
- James Gandolfini
- Paul Iacono
- Cherry Jones
- Julie Keyes
- Nathan Lane
- Tracy Morgan
- Harold Prince
- John Turturro
- George C. Wolfe

The film was dedicated to the memory of Gandolfini, who died during its production.

== Release ==
Several film festivals screened the documentary through 2013. The film's limited release in US theaters on 21 February 2014 was followed by video on demand, then available on Netflix.

== Reception ==
Elaine Stritch: Shoot Me holds a 99% rating at Rotten Tomatoes from 67 reviews, with an average score of 7.89/10. The critical consensus reads: "Brutally honest and utterly compelling, Elaine Stritch: Shoot Me offers a riveting, vanity-free portrait of its legendary subject while offering a few essential truths about the human condition."

Jake Coyle of The Associated Press called it "an irresistibly entertaining documentary that captures Stritch during what she unsentimentally calls 'almost post-time.' After seven decades performing in New York — on Broadway, in countless cabaret nights at the Cafe Carlyle — Stritch's enormous energy has been knocked by the increasing years, diabetes, and surgeries on her hip and eyes. But Shoot Me, made over the last few years, is a document not of Stritch's dwindling, but of her feisty persistence."
