= Code of the West (2012 film) =

- Film poster
- Directed by: Rebecca Richman Cohen
- Release date: March 11, 2012 (SXSW)
- Country: United States

Code of the West is an American 2012 documentary film directed by Rebecca Richman Cohen about the 2010 campaign to repeal Montana's legalization of medical marijuana.
