= Sarah Goldberg =

Canadian actress (born 1985)

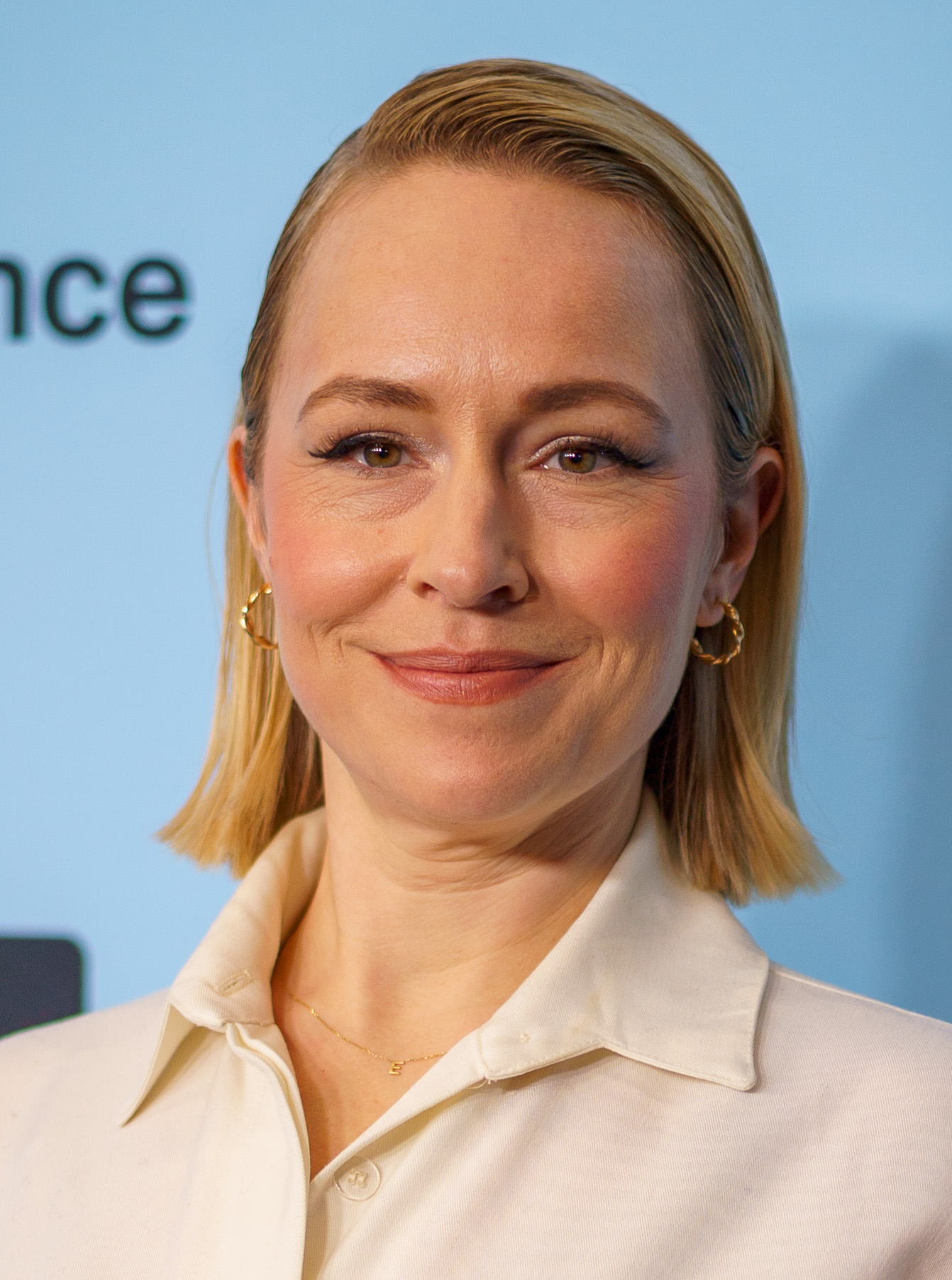
- Goldberg at the 2025 Sundance Film Festival
- Born: May 31, 1985 (age 41); Vancouver, British Columbia, Canada
- Education: London Academy of Music and Dramatic Art
- Occupation: Actress
- Years active: 2007–present
- Notable credits: Barry; Clybourne Park

Sarah Goldberg (born May 31, 1985) is a Canadian actress. She is best known for her role as struggling actress Sally Reed in the HBO tragicomedy crime series Barry (2018–2023), which earned her a nomination for the Primetime Emmy Award for Outstanding Supporting Actress in a Comedy Series. She also originated the dual role of Betsey/Lindsey in the Royal Court Theatre's production of Clybourne Park, for which she was nominated for a 2011 Olivier Award, and later performed it on Broadway.

== Early life ==
Goldberg was born into a Jewish family in Vancouver, British Columbia, on May 31, 1985. Attracted to the theatre, she participated in productions in high school. After backpacking through Europe, she was accepted to the London Academy of Music and Dramatic Art (LAMDA) in 2004 and subsequently moved to London. She worked as a waitress and babysitter to support herself.

== Career ==
Shortly after graduating, Goldberg gained her first role in a production of Carson McCullers' The Member of the Wedding at the Young Vic. She also did voice-overs, motion capture for video games, and instructional videos. She was cast in Apologia at the Bush Theatre in 2009, and also appeared in Bekah Brunstetter's Miss Lilly Gets Boned at the Finborough Theatre and John Guare's Six Degrees of Separation at the Old Vic. In 2011, she was cast in a supporting role in Bruce Norris' Clybourne Park at the Royal Court, originating the dual role of Betsey/Lindsey. She was nominated for an Olivier Award for her performance, and later performed the play on Broadway. She portrayed Alison Porter in Sam Gold's off-Broadway 2012 revival of John Osborne's Look Back in Anger, opposite Adam Driver and Matthew Rhys, and then appeared in Amy Herzog's The Great God Pan at Playwrights Horizons.

Goldberg had small parts in the films A Bunch of Amateurs (2008) and The Dark Knight Rises (2012). She also starred in the short-lived comedy-drama series Hindsight (2015). She began playing aspiring actress Sally Reed in the HBO dark comedy series Barry (2018–2023), for which she was nominated for the Primetime Emmy Award for Outstanding Supporting Actress in a Comedy Series in 2019. She has starred in Sisters, a show she also co-wrote. In 2024, she has a recurring role as Petra Koenig in the third season of the HBO comedy-drama series Industry. She is currently starring in AMC's dark comedy The Audacity.

== Filmography ==
=== Film ===
Year	Title	Role	Notes
2008	A Bunch of Amateurs	2nd Cinema Girl	
2012	The Dark Knight Rises	Analyst #1	
2012	Gambit	Executive Wilson	
2014	Drifters	Clara Norris	Short film
2016	Lucia, Before and After	Lucia Dziedek	Short film
2017	Crown Heights	Shirley Robedee	
2017	Izzy Gets the F*ck Across Town	Whitney	
2017	Bikini Moon	Kate	
2018	Games for Girls	Ess	Short film
2018	The Hummingbird Project	Mascha	
2019	The Report	April	
2020	The Night House	Claire	
2022	Rogue Agent	Jenny	
2024	We Strangers	Tracy Patel	
2025	Bubble & Squeak	Delores	
TBA	Silent Retreat †	Gillian	Post-production

Key
†	Denotes films that have not yet been released

=== Television ===
Year	Title	Role	Notes
2010	Any Human Heart	Miss Katz	Episode: "#1.3"
2014	Elementary	Miss Truepenny	Episode: "The One Percent Solution"
2014	Black Box	Florence Huggins	Episode: "I Shall Be Released"
2015	Hindsight	Lolly Lavigne	Main cast
2018–2023	Barry	Sally Reed	Main cast
2023–present	Sisters	Sare	Main cast, also executive producer
2024	Industry	Petra Koenig	Main cast (series 3)
2026-present	The Audacity	JoAnne Felder	Main cast

=== Stage ===
Year	Title	Role	Notes
2009	Apologia	Trudi	Bush Theatre
2010	Six Degrees of Separation	Elizabeth	Old Vic Theatre
2010	Clybourne Park	Betsy/Lindsey	Royal Court Theatre
2012	Look Back in Anger	Allison Porter	Laura Pels Theatre
2012	Clybourne Park	Betsy/Lindsey	Walter Kerr Theatre
2012	The Great God Pan	Paige	Playwrights Horizons
2013	The Unavoidable Disappearance of Tom Durnin	Katie Nicholson	Laura Pels Theatre
2015	The Qualms	Kristy	Playwrights Horizons

== Awards and nominations ==
Year	Award	Category	Nominated work	Result	Ref
2011	Laurence Olivier Awards	Best Actress in a Supporting Role	Clybourne Park	Nominated	
2019	Screen Actors Guild Awards	Outstanding Performance by an Ensemble in a Comedy Series	Barry	Nominated	
2019	Primetime Emmy Awards	Outstanding Supporting Actress in a Comedy Series	Barry	Nominated	
2020	Screen Actors Guild Awards	Outstanding Performance by an Ensemble in a Comedy Series	Barry	Nominated	
2023	Screen Actors Guild Awards	Outstanding Performance by an Ensemble in a Comedy Series	Barry	Nominated	
2024	Screen Actors Guild Awards	Outstanding Performance by an Ensemble in a Comedy Series	Barry	Nominated	
