= List of Silicon Valley characters =

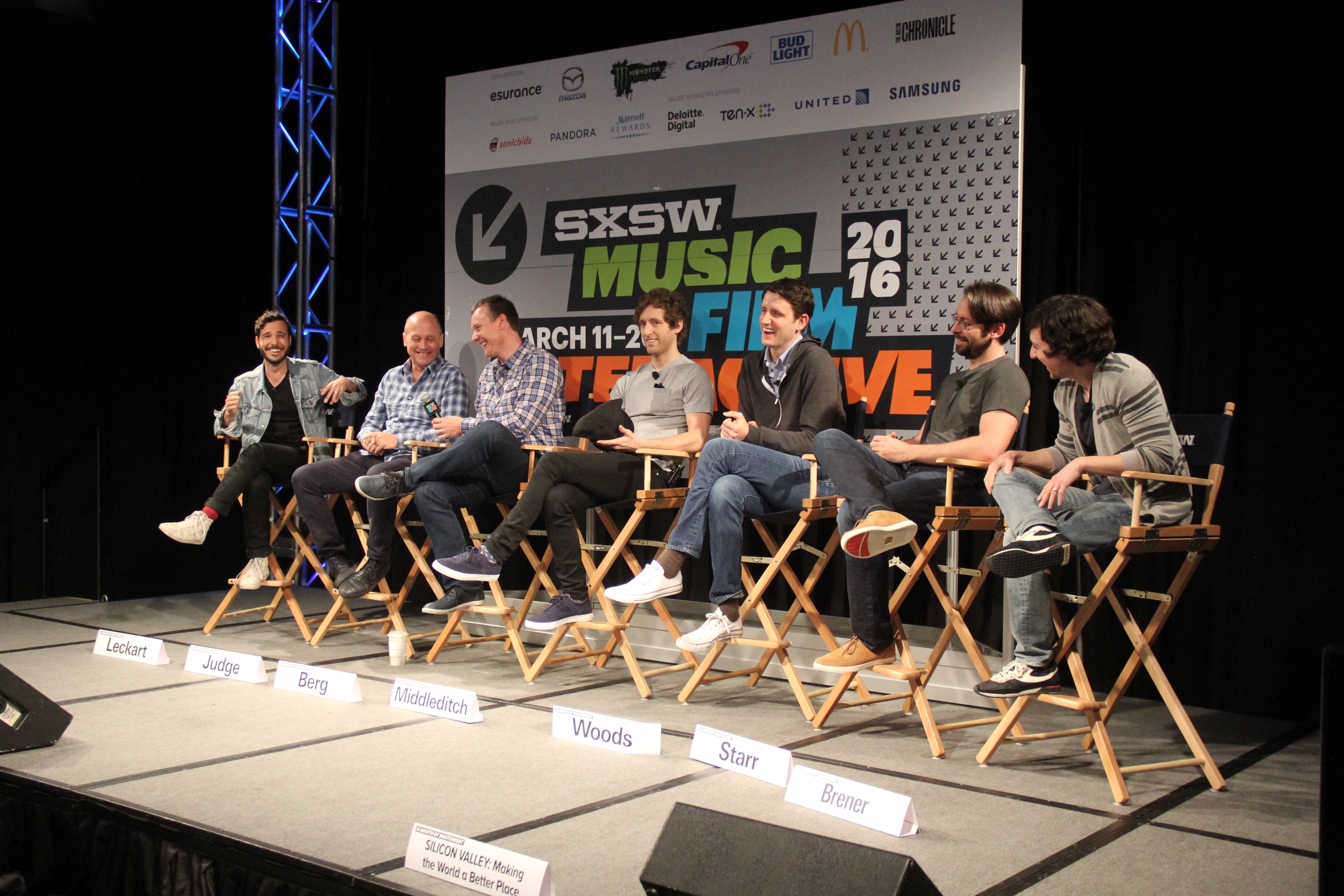
From left: Moderator Steven Leckart, co-creator Mike Judge, executive producer Alec Berg, and stars Thomas Middleditch, Zach Woods, Martin Starr, and Josh Brener at 2016 South by Southwest.

Silicon Valley is an American comedy television series created by Mike Judge, John Altschuler and Dave Krinsky. The series stars Thomas Middleditch, T.J. Miller, Josh Brener, Martin Starr, Kumail Nanjiani, Christopher Evan Welch, Amanda Crew, Zach Woods, Matt Ross, Suzanne Cryer, Jimmy O. Yang, Stephen Tobolowsky, and Chris Diamantopoulos. The series premiered on HBO on April 6, 2014.

== Overview ==
Actor	Character	Seasons					
Actor	Character	1	2	3	4	5	6
Thomas Middleditch	Richard Hendricks	Main	Main	Main	Main	Main	Main
T.J. Miller	Erlich Bachman	Main	Main	Main	Main		
Josh Brener	Nelson "Big Head" Bighetti	Main	Main	Main	Main	Main	Main
Martin Starr	Bertram Gilfoyle	Main	Main	Main	Main	Main	Main
Kumail Nanjiani	Dinesh Chugtai	Main	Main	Main	Main	Main	Main
Christopher Evan Welch	Peter Gregory	Main					
Amanda Crew	Monica Hall	Main	Main	Main	Main	Main	Main
Zach Woods	Donald "Jared" Dunn	Main	Main	Main	Main	Main	Main
Matt Ross	Gavin Belson	Recurring	Main	Main	Main	Main	Main
Jimmy O. Yang	Jian-Yang	Recurring	Main	Main	Main	Main	Main
Suzanne Cryer	Laurie Bream		Main	Main	Main	Main	Main
Stephen Tobolowsky	"Action" Jack Barker			Recurring	Main		
Chris Diamantopoulos	Russ Hanneman		Recurring	Recurring	Main	Guest	Main

== Main characters ==
=== Richard Hendricks ===
Richard Hendricks
- First appearance: "Minimum Viable Product" (2014)
- Last appearance: "Exit Event" (2019)
- Created by: Mike Judge; John Altschuler; Dave Krinsky
- Portrayed by: Thomas Middleditch

In-universe information
- Gender: Male
- Occupation: Coder; Chief executive officer; Chief technology officer; Professor at Stanford University
- Nationality: American

Richard Hendricks, portrayed by Thomas Middleditch, is a Stanford dropout and coder at tech company Hooli. Richard quits his job to pursue his compression application Pied Piper. The company initially starts out as a simple data compression platform, but when this, and a videochat that Dinesh created with the algorithm fails, Richard pivots toward creating a new, decentralized internet, called PiperNet. For the most part, Richard is shy and weak-willed, and does not have much of a temper, but when he finally reaches his limit, is prone to explosions of anger. Richard is constantly struggling with the demands of the business world, preferring instead to disappear into the coding of his application, but realizes that as CEO he must do more.

Throughout most of the series, Richard is determined to make Pied Piper a company different from the dreary Hooli and the condescending, aloof Gavin Belson, but as the series progresses, it becomes clear that the many trials and tribulations of trying to get his business to succeed have made him cynical, narcissistic and unappeasable, in much the same vein as the man from whom he once sought to distinguish himself. This is exemplified in the season 5 premiere, wherein Richard uses Gavin's tactic of spending large amounts of company money and resources to bankrupt two weaker, recently merged companies, ostensibly to acquire their coders, but in reality to get petty vengeance on the two CEOs, who had tried to screw him over. Richard has also grown more aggressive and outspoken toward his friends, even insulting Gilfoyle without fear. However, Richard has also grown more competent and prideful in business by season 5, effectively using Gavin's ego to stall his 51% attack on Pied Piper and gain back 51% of the company, allowing Richard to finally release PiperNet the way he wants it without more interference.

In season 6, Richard once again struggles between executing business tactics and not compromising his own moral values. He proclaims in front of the United States Senate that Pied Piper will not collect user data and the implementation of a decentralized internet will prevent such actions from taking place, but soon finds that one of Pied Piper's developers, Collin, is actively mining user data. He attempts to blackmail Collin by using APIs to collect his phone calls, but the plan backfires when Collin shows off the technology to interested investors. Collin would later join Chilean billionaire Maximo Reyes's alliance with YaoNet, Pied Piper's main competitor after Richard turned down an offer from Reyes to purchase a $1 billion stake in Pied Piper because Richard refused to collect user data. Pied Piper is able to fend off YaoNet when they purchase the cash-strapped Hooli by going around Gavin Belson and convinces his board to sign on. Later, Belson, forced into retirement, publishes a code of conduct known as "Tethics" for all major companies to sign on. Richard refused initially out of anger at Belson's blatant hypocrisy, but soon discovers that Belson had plagiarized from the mission statements of companies such as Applebee's and Starbucks. Richard then attempts to close a deal with AT&T but was turned down initially. While running the internet service at Russ Hanneman's RussFest, Richard discovers YaoNet's presence at the festival. He and the team initially fend off YaoNet, but soon learns from Laurie Bream that YaoNet was only observing the performance of PiperNet and that it is not more advanced compared to YaoNet. Richard initially breaks down at the revelation, but later reverts the system with artificial intelligence, leading to success at RussFest and a $100 million deal with AT&T. However, days before PiperNet's launch, Richard discovers that the network's AI has become so advanced that it can bypass advanced encryptions, meaning that it can potentially end privacy if implemented on a large scale. Although initially reluctant, Richard agrees to intentionally sabotage PiperNet in order to prevent the AI from potentially ending internet privacy. After PiperNet's launch caused thousands of rats to emerge onto streets all over the country, Richard shuts down Pied Piper in shame. He would later travel the world and is revealed to have become a "Gavin Belson Professor of Technology Ethics" at Stanford University ten years after the initial PiperNet launch.

=== Erlich Bachman ===
Erlich Bachman
- First appearance: "Minimum Viable Product" (2014)
- Last appearance: "Server Error" (2017)
- Created by: Mike Judge; John Altschuler; Dave Krinsky
- Portrayed by: T.J. Miller

In-universe information
- Gender: Male
- Occupation: Entrepreneur; PR representative
- Nationality: American

Erlich Bachman, portrayed by T.J. Miller (seasons 1–4), is an arrogant entrepreneur who founded an innovation incubator in his home after the purchase of his airfare collator Aviato. Erlich still holds on to his glory days in the valley, wearing Aviato T-shirts and driving a Ford Escape adorned with Aviato logos. Under the incubator agreement, Erlich owns 10% of Pied Piper, and is later appointed to the company's board of directors after Richard realizes how important Erlich is to the business. Erlich is a frequent user of marijuana. It is revealed in the season 2 finale that Erlich no longer codes because of severe carpal tunnel syndrome. Despite being relatively unsuccessful in his own entrepreneurial ventures, he is a charismatic public speaker and negotiator, and is often seen as the "face" of Pied Piper. In season 3 he begins to have a less active role in Pied Piper. He begins to start his own VC firm with Big Head but then declares bankruptcy.

After selling his Pied Piper shares to cover his debts, he gets rehired into the company as a PR representative. When Richard starts his new company using the Pied Piper trademark, Erlich then owns 10% of the new company while keeping his PR job at the old company which is eventually deleted. Erlich then decides to focus on Jian-Yang's product which also fails. After another failed deal with Kenan Feldspar and quitting his job at Bream-Hall, Erlich then decides that he and Richard will never be successful and moves away to Tibet to join Gavin Belson at a monastery at the end of season 4. When Gavin is informed that Jack Barker is being held hostage, he immediately proceeds to take Erlich with him to leave Tibet. However, Erlich then becomes intoxicated upon consuming opium at an inn, and Gavin pays the innkeeper enough money to take care of Erlich for five years.

Erlich is never heard from again afterward, although Richard reveals in "Exit Event" that he tried to look for Erlich in Tibet.

=== Nelson "Big Head" Bighetti ===
Nelson "Big Head" Bighetti
- First appearance: "Minimum Viable Product" (2014)
- Last appearance: "Exit Event" (2019)
- Created by: Mike Judge; John Altschuler; Dave Krinsky
- Portrayed by: Josh Brener

In-universe information
- Gender: Male
- Occupation: Coder; Computer science instructor; President of Stanford University
- Nationality: American

Nelson "Big Head" Bighetti, portrayed by Josh Brener, is a former tenant of Erlich's incubator and Richard's best friend who also works at Hooli. He is unintelligent and naïve, but still manages to acquire a significant role as a result of the struggle between Hooli and Pied Piper. After work on Pied Piper commences, Big Head is offered a huge raise and promotion by Gavin Belson to help Hooli develop its copycat software, Nucleus, out of spite and because Richard was forced to limit his staff. He is continually promoted so rapidly that buzz develops about him, and he ends up on the cover of Wired magazine.

He is later removed from the Nucleus project due to his lack of technical knowledge, and has absolutely no responsibilities at Hooli. He was later promoted further to make it appear that he was the actual creator of Pied Piper while working at Hooli, but he is unaware of this. After a disastrous binding arbitration with Pied Piper, Gavin makes Big Head redundant and pays him $20 million in severance, which he blows through very quickly when Erlich tricks him into entering into a business arrangement with him, naming their firm, "Bachmanity". Big Head then buys a majority stake in PiperChat following the sale of a technology blog he and Erlich owned. Due to his poor business skills, his father takes over control of his share on his behalf.

In season 4, Big Head takes a position as a Computer Science instructor at Stanford University. In season 5, after discovering that he never formally severed his arrangement with Erlich, Big Head is legally Erlich's next-of-kin and gains ownership of Erlich's house and 10% ownership of Pied Piper from Jian-Yang. Big Head moves into Erlich's house but keeps in touch with Jian-Yang, allowing him to move back into the house after Jian-Yang loses everything in China.

In season 6, Big Head continues to run the Hacker Hostel with Jian-Yang but is aloof to his unethical activities. After Jian-Yang refused to give Pied Piper the backdoor key of his algorithm, Big Head reveals that he has recited it and gives it to Richard. In the series finale "Exit Event", it is revealed that Big Head's father's stake has been bought by Russ Hanneman, although Big Head himself is unaware of it. Ten years after PiperNet's launch, Big Head has become the President of Stanford University and has hired Richard to work as a "Gavin Belson Professor of Technology Ethics".

=== Bertram Gilfoyle ===
Bertram Gilfoyle
- First appearance: "Minimum Viable Product" (2014)
- Last appearance: "Exit Event" (2019)
- Created by: Mike Judge; John Altschuler; Dave Krinsky
- Portrayed by: Martin Starr

In-universe information
- Gender: Male
- Occupation: Network engineer; System administrator
- Nationality: Canadian

Bertram Gilfoyle, portrayed by Martin Starr, is a LaVeyan Satanist network engineer and system architect. Initially an undocumented immigrant from Canada, Gilfoyle successfully applied for a visa after being pressured by Dinesh. Gilfoyle credits himself as an online security expert, and as such is responsible for system administration and server configuration at Pied Piper. Gilfoyle has a girlfriend Tara (Milana Vayntrub) who is also a LaVeyan Satanist, with the two having an open and long-standing relationship, though Tara still lies to Gilfoyle about sleeping with other men. Gilfoyle often plays mocking pranks on Dinesh, but the two do appear to be friends or at most, frenemies despite this, with the two often bonding over their shared moral ambiguity.

While he is usually indifferent to Richard and lacks loyalty toward him, Gilfoyle highly respects Richard as a coder and admits that Pied Piper is nothing without Richard. Like Dinesh, Gilfoyle is quick-witted and merciless, but in contrast, highly apathetic, sardonic and brutally honest. He acts as the systems architect of Pied Piper.

Gilfoyle is very confident in his abilities and has proven his worth to the Pied Piper team on multiple occasions, such as building the server farm "Anton", to save the company the struggle of paying for generic, mediocre servers in an office space. Due to this, Gilfoyle takes great pride in his security tech, becoming very nervous and confused whenever his tech is compromised. In season 5, Gilfoyle is promoted to senior management along with Dinesh with the title of "Chief Systems Architect".

By Season 6, Gilfoyle is promoted to VP of Architecture at Pied Piper but refuses to take anyone under his management, preferring to work on the Systems Architecture by himself. This leads to continual conflict with Head of HR Tracy Robertson. After Pied Piper is shut down, Gilfoyle and Dinesh begin to run a large cybersecurity firm together.

=== Dinesh Chugtai ===
Dinesh Chugtai
- First appearance: "Minimum Viable Product" (2014)
- Last appearance: "Exit Event" (2019)
- Created by: Mike Judge; John Altschuler; Dave Krinsky
- Portrayed by: Kumail Nanjiani

In-universe information
- Gender: Male
- Occupation: Programmer; Chief executive officer; VP of Engineering
- Nationality: American, Pakistani

Dinesh Chugtai, portrayed by Kumail Nanjiani, is a talented programmer specializing in Java originally from Karachi, Pakistan who is typically the victim of Gilfoyle's embarrassing games and pranks. Dinesh exhibits a quick-witted and merciless temperament toward everyone on the team, and often behaves in a deceitful and unhelpful manner, such as when he plots the death of a man who was dating the girl that he liked. Dinesh is also shown to be especially materialistic and uncomfortable with women. Dinesh always seems to run into bad luck, which Gilfoyle credits as karma for Dinesh being a bad person.

Like Gilfoyle, Dinesh usually lacks loyalty to Richard, exemplified in season 4, when Dinesh was briefly CEO of PiperChat, he refused to give Richard algorithm usage data in exchange for use of the algorithm as promised. Dinesh has proven that when given the opportunity or a small stream of good luck, he is more than willing to ditch his friends. However, Richard keeps Dinesh on account that despite his disloyal acts, Dinesh is still very good at what he does. In season 5, Dinesh is promoted to senior management along with Gilfoyle and gains an obsession with being the "top Tesla driver" in the company. In Season 6, Dinesh is promoted to VP of Engineering but is usually disrespected by his employees. In the series finale "Exit Event", Dinesh initially recuses himself from participating in the Pied Piper team's attempt to sabotage the launch of PiperNet, believing that his pride and greed will be in the way. However, when he is notified that the faulty code meant to disrupt PiperNet was reverted, Dinesh personally walked to the top of the Salesforce Tower to install the faulty code, successfully crashing PiperNet. After Pied Piper closed, Dinesh and Gilfoyle began to run a large cybersecurity firm together.

=== Peter Gregory ===
Peter Gregory
- First appearance: "Minimum Viable Product" (2014)
- Last appearance: "Signaling Risk" (2014)
- Created by: Mike Judge; John Altschuler; Dave Krinsky
- Portrayed by: Christopher Evan Welch

In-universe information
- Gender: Male
- Occupation: Chief executive officer
- Nationality: American

Peter Gregory, portrayed by Christopher Evan Welch (season 1), is the billionaire founder and CEO of Raviga Capital as well a 5% equity owner of Pied Piper after his $200,000 participating interests. Gregory is extremely intelligent, but socially awkward, eccentric and fastidious. Historically, Gregory and Gavin Belson were friends, however their relationship soured as each went to run their own competing tech companies, making interactions between them awkward.

Welch died after the fifth episode of season 1 was completed, but the character remained present off-screen for the remainder of the season. Gregory later died in the season 2 premiere. Monica is saddened by Gregory's death and still highly reveres him, becoming very disappointed whenever the values Gregory believed in and instilled in the Valley are dishonored, notably by Laurie Bream's profit-motivated approach to business.

In season 4 it is revealed that Peter Gregory theorized decentralized internet years before Richard Hendricks did, but he was limited by the technology of his time.

=== Monica Hall ===
Monica Hall
- First appearance: "Minimum Viable Product" (2014)
- Last appearance: "Exit Event" (2019)
- Created by: Mike Judge; John Altschuler; Dave Krinsky
- Portrayed by: Amanda Crew

In-universe information
- Gender: Female
- Occupation: Associate partner at Raviga Capital and Bream-Hall; Chief Financial Officer of Pied Piper
- Nationality: American

Monica Hall, portrayed by Amanda Crew, is an employee of Raviga Capital and associate partner under both Peter Gregory and later Laurie Bream. Monica is often charged with engaging with clients on a more personable and approachable way than either Gregory or Bream are, and as such forms a close friendship with Richard after she convinces him to launch Pied Piper on his own. In season 4, Monica was demoted by Laurie after she voted against selling Pied Piper to the highest bidder, which turns out to be Erlich's company Bachmanity rather than Hooli. Later, Monica realizes that Ed Chen, an up-and-coming colleague at Raviga, is attempting to remove Laurie, she notifies her, earning Laurie's trust in the process. They soon both depart Raviga to form a new VC firm, Bream/Hall and proceeds to fund Pied Piper. In season 5, upon realizing that Laurie plans to take advantage of Pied Piper once they get their Series B funding, Monica finally severs all business ties with her and moves to Pied Piper as its new chief financial officer. In season 6, Monica continues to assist and advise Richard on business affairs and helped in Pied Piper's successful acquisition of Hooli. In "Exit Event", ten years after PiperNet's launch, Monica has moved to Washington, D.C. and is working for a "think tank", although it is later indicated that she is in fact working for the NSA.

=== Donald "Jared" Dunn ===
Donald "Jared" Dunn
- First appearance: "Minimum Viable Product" (2014)
- Last appearance: "Exit Event" (2019)
- Created by: Mike Judge; John Altschuler; Dave Krinsky
- Portrayed by: Zach Woods

In-universe information
- Gender: Male
- Occupation: Vice president; Chief operating officer; Business advisor; Chief operating officer
- Nationality: American

Donald "Jared" Dunn, portrayed by Zach Woods, is an ex-VP of Hooli who quits the company in order to join the Pied Piper team as its COO and business advisor. Like Richard, Jared is anxious and vulnerable, but gains confidence as the series progresses and the company's success necessitates it. Jared is a graduate of Vassar College and provides the business skills that the largely engineering-oriented team lacks, which Gilfoyle admits is very helpful due to their disdain for the business side of startups, providing business strategies to the team such as scrum and SWOT analysis. He is also exceedingly optimistic, kind-hearted and staunchly loyal to Richard, sacrificing his high-paying and financially secure job at Hooli to lend his business expertise to Pied Piper.

His birth name is Donald, but his former boss, Gavin, once referred to him as Jared, and the nickname stuck, despite the Pied Piper team knowing it's not his real name. He is frequently roasted by the other employees of Pied Piper, aside from Richard who often protects him, though he tends to be oblivious of this or too uptight to actually understand the insult. Jared is usually depicted as the most empathetic person on the team, given most of the team's moral ambiguity. Over the course of the series, Jared drops bits and pieces of his considerably dark backstory, such as being the product of a forced adoption to finding his biological father in the Ozarks. In season 5, Jared is promoted to chief operating officer of Pied Piper. In season 6, Jared leaves Pied Piper, feeling that it is no longer the company he loved and has refocused his efforts to advising developers at the incubator. His loyalty and respect for Richard have deteriorated following this decision. Jared later returns to help Pied Piper successfully acquire Hooli, but request that he and Gwart, the coder he is mentoring, be released from their contracts. Gwart would later leave to work for Laurie Bream. Later on Jared tracks down his birth parents, and learns that they gave him up for adoption because they thought they don't have enough room for a third child, only to discover later that they do. The experience traumatized Jared, causing him to become increasingly committed to helping other people. In the finale "Exit Event", Jared convinces Richard to sabotage PiperNet by using the example of J. Robert Oppenheimer's regret for developing the atomic bomb. After Pied Piper closed, Jared begins to work at a nursing home.

=== Gavin Belson ===
Gavin Belson
- First appearance: "Minimum Viable Product" (2014)
- Last appearance: "Exit Event" (2019)
- Created by: Mike Judge; John Altschuler; Dave Krinsky
- Portrayed by: Matt Ross

In-universe information
- Gender: Male
- Occupation: Chief executive officer; Author
- Nationality: American

Gavin Belson, portrayed by Matt Ross (recurring season 1, starring season 2–6), is the CEO and founder of tech giant Hooli and the series' main antagonist, who embodies the soulless corporate culture that Richard is desperate to avoid with Pied Piper. Belson constantly spews forth pseudo-philosophical rants to his employees, who remain enamored with his work, but at the same time demonstrates complete ignorance and a mean spirit. Belson later goes on to publish a code of ethics in technology business. After the ending, it is revealed Belson has become an author and released best selling novels.

=== Jian-Yang ===
Jian-Yang
- First appearance: "Articles of Incorporation" (2014)
- Last appearance: "Exit Event" (2019)
- Created by: Matteo Borghese; Rob Turbovsky
- Portrayed by: Jimmy O. Yang

In-universe information
- Gender: Male
- Occupation: App developer
- Nationality: Chinese

Jian-Yang, portrayed by Jimmy O. Yang (recurring season 1, starring season 2–6), is another tenant of Erlich's incubator, and the only person who lives there that is not involved with Pied Piper in any capacity. He speaks English with a mixed Cantonese-Mandarin accent. Jian-Yang and Erlich have frequent disagreements, given Erlich's racist bullying from the start. In general, Jian-Yang appears to play naive, but then takes advantage of Erlich's naïveté or stupidity. For example, after Erlich complains how difficult it is for a landowner to evict a tenant, Jian-Yang decides to take advantage of this fact and lives rent-free in Erlich's house for a year. As payback for Erlich's racist abuse, Jian-Yang often insults and makes prank calls to Erlich, and takes a sadistic enjoyment in tormenting him. At the end of the show, Jian-Yang has assumed Erlich's identity.

=== Laurie Bream ===
Laurie Bream
- First appearance: "Sand Hill Shuffle" (2015)
- Last appearance: "Exit Event" (2019)
- Created by: Clay Tarver
- Portrayed by: Suzanne Cryer

In-universe information
- Gender: Female
- Occupation: Chief executive officer
- Children: 4
- Nationality: American

Laurie Bream, portrayed by Suzanne Cryer (season 2–6), is the replacement for Peter Gregory as CEO of Raviga Capital, and later co-founder of Bream Hall Capital with Monica. Like her predecessor, Laurie is highly intelligent and socially inept, but appears to rely more on tangible metrics than Peter. Further, unlike him, she is completely devoid of empathy, emotion or any kind of idealism, concerning herself only with making a profit. Little is known about Laurie's personal life, except that she's recently had her fourth child, and is taking low dose MDMA for severe post-partum depression.

In season 2, Laurie initially offers Pied Piper $20 million in Series A funding at a $100 million valuation, but Richard instead takes half of Laurie's offer upon advice from Monica. After Hooli files a lawsuit against Richard, Laurie drops Pied Piper from Raviga's portfolio. After Richard won against Hooli in binding arbitration, Laurie buys Russ Hanneman's stake and three board seats in Pied Piper, and immediately removes Richard as CEO in an emergency board meeting.

In season 3, Laurie offers Richard to stay on as CTO and reserve his board seat, which Richard initially refuses until he met with Jack Barker, Laurie's choice for CEO. After a disagreement between the Pied Piper team and Jack on what platform to develop, Laurie sides with Pied Piper upon realizing the value of their platform and fires Barker, later reinstalling Richard as CEO. After it was discovered that Jared had been using click farms to increase Pied Piper's Daily Active Users (DAU), Laurie proceeds to sell Pied Piper to the highest bidder. Initially thought to be Hooli, Laurie later sells Pied Piper to Bachmanity, owned by Erlich and Big Head, after they outbid Hooli by one dollar. However, Monica is demoted as a result for voting against Laurie.

In season 4, Laurie becomes pregnant with her fourth child and faces a hostile takeover from Ed Chen. She proceeds to partner with Monica upon learning her loyalty and forms a new VC called Bream-Hall together, later agreeing to fund Pied Piper once again after its concept of a decentralized internet was successfully proven. In season 5, Laurie initially offers Pied Piper $30 million in series B funding, but later reveals that she plans to leverage them into collecting user data and other actions, leading to Pied Piper pulling out and fund itself through its ICO, PiperCoin. Laurie later partners up with Yao, a Chinese businessman who owns YaoNet, the version of Pied Piper developed by Jian-Yang, and attempts a failed hostile takeover of Pied Piper's network.

In season 6, Laurie is revealed to have split from Yao and has moved YaoNet's operations to the U.S. She later partners with Maximo Reyes, the Chilean businessman who attempted to buy a $1 billion stake in Pied Piper. The Pied Piper team later found her at RussFest, where she revealed that she was spying on PiperNet's abilities. In the series finale "Exit Event", Laurie is revealed to be in prison ten years after the initial PiperNet launch, although the reason for her imprisonment was never told.

=== Russ Hanneman ===
Russ Hanneman
- First appearance: "Bad Money" (2015)
- Last appearance: "Exit Event" (2019)
- Created by: Alec Berg
- Portrayed by: Chris Diamantopoulos

In-universe information
- Gender: Male
- Occupation: Investor
- Children: 1
- Nationality: American

Russ Hanneman, portrayed by Chris Diamantopoulos (recurring season 2–3, starring season 4 and 6, guest season 5), is a brash, loud and fiery billionaire investor who provides Pied Piper with their Series A funding. He initially earned his fortune by "putting radio on the internet" (a parody of how Mark Cuban earned his wealth), and is very protective of his billionaire identity. At the end of season 2, Russ sells his share of Pied Piper to Raviga Capital after it won against Hooli in binding arbitration, helping him to become a billionaire again. Russ is later found broke due to putting all of his money into 36 ICOs, with only one of them being successful but losing the thumb drive containing the coin. In season 6, Russ approaches Richard and helps him avoid investigation from the Attorney General of California through his possession of dirt on the attorney general, and in exchange, Richard agrees to provide internet for Russ's three-day festival in the Nevada desert, RussFest. Although there were initial issues, the Pied Piper team successfully implemented a large decentralized service through artificial intelligence, leading to Russ purchasing a stake in Pied Piper before the launch of PiperNet. In the series finale "Exit Event", Russ reveals in a documentary produced ten years after PiperNet's launch that he has managed to earn his wealth back by investing in hair transplants.

=== Jack Barker ===
"Action" Jack Barker
- First appearance: "Founder Friendly" (2016)
- Last appearance: "Server Error" (2017)
- Created by: Dan O'Keefe
- Portrayed by: Stephen Tobolowsky

In-universe information
- Gender: Male
- Occupation: Chief executive officer
- Nationality: American

"Action" Jack Barker, portrayed by Stephen Tobolowsky (recurring season 3, starring season 4), is briefly the CEO of Pied Piper and later Hooli. He has a self-designed business model called the "Conjoined Triangles of Success", and often applies it in his career. In season 3, Jack is picked by Laurie Bream as the new CEO of Pied Piper, which Richard initially opposes until Barker tells him that he will turn down Laurie's offer if Richard leaves as well. The Pied Piper team, however, soon becomes disillusioned with his business approach, including his excessive spending on a new office and sales team. Barker later demands the Pied Piper team to make a data storage box, which the team initially tries to sabotage until it was inadvertently discovered by him. After discovering his attempts to undermine her, Laurie fires Jack as CEO. After running into Gavin Belson at an airport, Jack is hired as Hooli's head of development and immediately begins to work on the box he had planned to produce with Pied Piper with Endframe.

In season 4, Jack and Gavin secure a deal with Chinese producers to make the Hooli-Endframe boxes. But on their way back, Jack requested the pilot to drop him off first at Jackson Hole, Wyoming instead of Mountain View. Upon finding out that the route caused him to travel a longer distance, Gavin is enraged. In retaliation, he moves Jack's office to the data storage room. Despite this, Jack remains optimistic, leading Gavin to track down his call history with his grandchildren. After Gavin is fired following the numerous COPPA violations in PiperChat, Jack replaces him as CEO and finds a way around the COPPA fines. After the Hooli boxes suffer a setback in their rollout at HooliCon, Jack acquires the VR company owned by Kennan Feldspar and uses it for a demo at the conference. However, the mobile demo, along with the unbeknownst installment of Pied Piper's internet, causes numerous Hooli phones to explode at HooliCon and elsewhere. Instead of a firmware update, Barker orders for 9 million Hooli phones to be replaced in a three-day span. He travels to Hooli's factory in China and attempts to boost production through a motivational speech, but is instead taken hostage by the workers. Gavin, who is in Tibet, learns of Hooli's failures and Barker's hostage situation and heads to the factory to successfully negotiate Jack's release. This helps Gavin regains the Hooli board's trust, and he regains his position as CEO and ousts Jack.

== Recurring characters ==
- Aly Mawji as Aly Dutta/Naveen Dutt (seasons 1–3), a Hooli coder who bullies Richard and Big Head. He is charged with working on Nucleus as a lead engineer.
- Brian Tichnell as Jason Winter (seasons 1–3), a Hooli programmer who bullies Richard and Big Head. He is also charged with working on Nucleus as a lead engineer. He along with Aly quits Hooli after being fed up with Gavin's antics.
- Jill E. Alexander as Patrice (seasons 1–3, 5), a Hooli employee. She is fired by Gavin after showing distaste toward his animal abuse.
- Andy Daly as Dr. Crawford, a Silicon Valley doctor whom Richard regularly sees.
- Ben Feldman as Ron LaFlamme, Pied Piper's young, laid-back but competent outside counsel.
- Gabriel Tigerman as Gary Irving (seasons 1–3), the human resources manager at Hooli.
- Bernard White as Denpok, Gavin's manipulative spiritual advisor.
- Kara Swisher as herself, a tech journalist who often interviews some of the show's characters.
- Matt McCoy as Pete Monahan (seasons 2–4), a disgraced former lawyer who represents Richard, Erlich and Pied Piper at the binding arbitration of the Hooli lawsuit.
- Jake Broder as Dan Melcher (seasons 1, 4), a former TechCrunch Judge who is kicked out after he beats up Bachman for sleeping with his wife. He later returns in season four as the CTO of an insurance company.
- Alice Wetterlund as Carla Walton (seasons 2–3), a programmer and friend of Gilfoyle and Dinesh's who joins the Pied Piper team. She later quits along with the other new hires after the failures with Homicide and Intersite. She later blackmails Pied Piper to pay her in exchange for non-disclosure of Pied Piper's "Skunkworks" plan but refusing to return to the team.
- Chris Williams as Hoover (season 3–6), Hooli's head security officer. He admires Gavin and is determined to make each of his requests, though Gavin often disregards him. He is a veteran.
- Annie Sertich as C.J. Cantwell (season 3), a tech blogger. Erlich buys her blog after she is coerced into revealing Big Head was her source. Later the blog is bought out by Gavin himself after she hears about Gavin's illegal dumping of an elephant in the San Francisco Bay.
- Ken Lerner as Arthur, Big Head's business manager when he creates an incubator. He is later found to have embezzled money from Bachmanity.
- Henry Phillips as John Stafford, the downtrodden datacenter employee who shows other characters to their new underground offices, and offers to show the main cast individual racks where their "box" might be located once it is created.
- Haley Joel Osment as Keenan Feldspar (season 4), the developer of a VR headset who tries to buy out Pied Piper. When Richard rejects the deal, he signs with Hooli.
- Tim Chiou as Ed Chen (season 4), a venture capitalist that works at Raviga who currently serves as the firm's Managing Director.
- Emily Chang as herself (seasons 3–6), a journalist who interviews various characters.
- Tzi Ma as Yao (season 5), a Chinese businessman and manufacturing plant owner who works with Belson and Laurie.
- Aaron Sanders (seasons 5–6) as Holden, the much-abused protege of Jared.
- Aristotle Athari (seasons 5–6) as Gabe, a Pied Piper employee who works in quality assurance and annoys Dinesh. He has an Archelis wearable chair.
- Helen Hong as Tracy (season 6), the head of Human resources at Pied Piper.
- Arturo Castro as Maximo Reyes (season 6), a Chilean billionaire who purchased a stake in Pied Piper in season 6. He is later found to have a dark past.
- Avi Nash as Wajeed (seasons 2 and 6), Dinesh's cousin and founder of Bro.
- Nandini Bapat as Gwart (season 6), an eccentric, mute programmer initially living in the Hacker Hostel who ends up working for Pied Piper and later YaoNet.
