= Silicon Valley season 1 =

Silicon Valley
- Season 1
- Promotional poster
- Starring: Thomas Middleditch; T.J. Miller; Josh Brener; Martin Starr; Kumail Nanjiani; Christopher Evan Welch; Amanda Crew; Zach Woods
- No. of episodes: 8

Release
- Original network: HBO
- Original release: April 6 – June 1, 2014

Season chronology
- Next → Season 2

The first season of the American comedy television series Silicon Valley premiered in the United States on HBO on April 6, 2014. It consists of eight episodes, and concluded on June 1, 2014.

Silicon Valley follows a group of young men working on a startup company in Silicon Valley, California. The first season introduces the characters of Richard Hendricks (Thomas Middleditch), Erlich Bachman (T.J. Miller), Nelson "Big Head" Bighetti (Josh Brener), Bertram Gilfoyle (Martin Starr), Dinesh Chugtai (Kumail Nanjiani), and Jared Dunn (Zach Woods), who work together to create an app called Pied Piper, which is the result of Hendricks' development of a data compression algorithm.

The season received positive reviews from critics.

== Cast ==
=== Main ===
- Thomas Middleditch as Richard Hendricks
- T.J. Miller as Erlich Bachman
- Josh Brener as Nelson "Big Head" Bighetti
- Martin Starr as Bertram Gilfoyle
- Kumail Nanjiani as Dinesh Chugtai
- Christopher Evan Welch as Peter Gregory
- Amanda Crew as Monica Hall
- Zach Woods as Donald "Jared" Dunn

=== Recurring ===
- Matt Ross as Gavin Belson
- Jimmy O. Yang as Jian-Yang
- Ben Feldman as Ron LaFlamme
- Bernard White as Denpok, a guru
- Andy Daly as Doctor
- Aly Mawji as Aly Dutta
- Scott Prendergast as Scott
- Jill E. Alexander as Patrice
- Brian Tichnell as Jason

== Episodes ==
No. overall	No. in season	Title	Directed by	Written by	Original release date	U.S. viewers (millions)
1	1	"Minimum Viable Product"	Mike Judge	Mike Judge & John Altschuler & Dave Krinsky	April 6, 2014	1.98
Richard Hendricks is a low-level programmer with futuristic internet giant Hooli. He is often taunted by his more successful work colleagues, and his ideas are dismissed by egotistical entrepreneur Erlich Bachman, who owns the tech development incubator where Richard lives with fellow programmers Nelson "Big Head" Bighetti, Bertram Gilfoyle and Dinesh Chugtai. However when Hooli stumbles upon the music copyright service that Richard is working on, entitled Pied Piper, they discover that hidden within the useless application is the best file compression algorithm in the world, and news spreads quickly. Eventually Richard is caught between a $10 million buyout by Hooli CEO Gavin Belson, and a $200,000 investment from eccentric billionaire Peter Gregory; he must decide whether to give up his program to the highest bidder, or to take the investment and create a business out of it himself. After having a panic attack and vomiting, Richard runs into Peter's assistant Monica, who tells him that she believes in him and his idea. Richard decides to take the investment, and run the business himself.
2	2	"The Cap Table"	Mike Judge	Carson Mell	April 13, 2014	1.69
After rejecting Belson's offer and siding with Peter Gregory, Richard is overwhelmed by the amount of work that needs to be done in establishing the business to Gregory's satisfaction. Luckily, Belson's former PA, Jared Dunn, arrives at the incubator begging Richard to hire him, as he sees huge potential in the Pied Piper idea, and he is hired due to his business expertise. However, in evaluating the Pied Piper team, Jared discovers that while Gilfoyle and Dinesh are brilliant coders, Big Head is comparatively mediocre, and Richard is pressured by everyone to fire him as he brings nothing to the table. After much arguing, Richard refuses to fire him, but Big Head announces that he was given a huge raise and promotion at Hooli, as Gavin Belson wants to publicize Big Head as co-founder of Pied Piper. Later, Big Head tells Richard that Hooli has begun reverse-engineering Pied Piper to create a similar product: Nucleus.
3	3	"Articles of Incorporation"	Tricia Brock	Matteo Borghese & Rob Turbovsky	April 20, 2014	1.62
Richard and Jared discover that the Pied Piper business name is already in use by an irrigation company in Gilroy, California. While Jared, Dinesh and Gilfoyle begin brainstorming new names for the application, Erlich decides to find a new name for the company. He embarks on a vision quest in the Sonora Desert, but ends up having a panic attack after consuming too many hallucinogenic mushrooms. Adamant on keeping the original name, Richard attempts to prove that he is a good negotiator by convincing the irrigation company to give up the name Pied Piper. Initially the company's owner asks for $1000, but after reading about the technology's success on the web, he angrily demands a much larger sum. He ends up driving to Palo Alto to confront Richard, and after much arguing, Richard manages to keep the name for almost the original price. Erlich, still in the aftermath of his vision quest, returns with a child by his side, convinced he has found another version of himself. Meanwhile, Peter Gregory becomes obsessed with Burger King products, leaving his assistant Monica in a difficult position with one of their clients, who need an urgent cash injection or risk firing hundreds of people. Biding his time, Gregory ends up investing in sesame seed production, earning a huge profit in stock and solving the situation to Monica's and their associates' relief.
4	4	"Fiduciary Duties"	Maggie Carey	Ron Weiner	April 27, 2014	1.55
Peter assigns an attorney, Ron LaFlamme, to the Pied Piper venture, who accidentally reveals that Richard's project is only one of eight file compression ventures that Peter has invested in. This impacts Richard, who suddenly panics that he has no sense of where the company should go and what it should be doing. Meanwhile, Big Head is removed from Hooli's copycat project, named Nucleus, because of his utter lack of understanding of what Richard actually did to create Pied Piper. He is not reassigned to anything, and joins the other unassigned employees that spend their days biding their time on the company's roof. During a toga party organized by Gregory, Richard gets drunk and mistakenly appoints Erlich to the Pied Piper board of directors. Richard initially reverses the decision, but after Erlich elaborates during a meeting about Pied Piper's direction causing Peter to continue funding, Richard permanently appoints him on the board.
5	5	"Signaling Risk"	Alec Berg	Jessica Gao	May 4, 2014	1.82
Erlich hires a convicted felon and graffiti artist, Chuy, to create a new logo for Pied Piper and to paint it on the incubator garage. However, Chuy's creation depicts Dinesh having sexual intercourse with the Statue of Liberty, because he believes Dinesh is Latino. Pied Piper gains entry to the TechCrunch Startup Battlefield, a technology conference that pits unseeded startup companies against each other, with $50,000 as the grand prize. The only problem is, Pied Piper is not unseeded, and this angers Peter. Richard suggests withdrawing from the Battlefield, but Belson beats him to it and announces the release of Nucleus will take place at the Battlefield, and due to Peter's intense rivalry with Belson, he refuses to allow Pied Piper to withdraw. Peter tells the team to have a finished demo for the Battlefield in eight weeks, instead of the initial five months.
6	6	"Third Party Insourcing"	Alec Berg	Dan O'Keefe	May 11, 2014	1.69
Pied Piper is nearing completion, but Richard is having serious issues coding the cloud-based integration modules for the application, so much so that Jared, Gilfoyle, Erlich and Dinesh pressure him into hiring Kevin "The Carver" (Austin Abrams), an Adderall-addicted teenage programmer who specializes in cloud integration. The Carver ends up accidentally destroying all of Pied Piper's code, forcing the team to stay up all night fixing his mistake. Meanwhile, Gilfoyle's long-distance girlfriend, Tara (Milana Vayntrub), visits the incubator. Gilfoyle wrongfully tells Dinesh that Tara wants to have sex with him, and that this prospect sexually arouses both Tara and Gilfoyle. Jared gets stranded on Peter's automated island due to a programming error.
7	7	"Proof of Concept"	Mike Judge	Clay Tarver	May 18, 2014	1.68
The team arrives at the Battlefield. However, Pied Piper still isn't finished, and Richard is having trouble concentrating due to the presence of an ex-girlfriend at the conference; after much drama, the situation is eventually resolved. Dinesh meets an attractive girl, Charlotte (AJ Michalka), who appears to be proficient in Java, but when Gilfoyle tells him that the Java code was in fact written by him, Dinesh loses interest in Charlotte. Erlich panics when it transpires that one of the judges of the Battlefield is the man whose wife he had an affair with years earlier, and in an attempt to remedy the situation, Erlich ends up having sex with the judge's new wife, which results in the judge attacking Erlich on stage, preventing the Pied Piper Battlefield presentation.
8	8	"Optimal Tip-to-Tip Efficiency"	Mike Judge	Alec Berg	June 1, 2014	1.74
Desperate to avoid litigation after the brawl, TechCrunch offers Pied Piper a ticket straight to the final Battlefield stage, but the team is despondent after watching Hooli's presentation. Not only is Nucleus' Weissman compression quality score 2.89—the exact same as theirs—but it also has a number of additional features which makes it a much better application than Pied Piper. Jared suggests pivoting the company, which results in him being arrested by the police after an incident involving Adderall. The PP team retreats to their hotel room where they mock up a mathematical model for Erlich to give handjobs to every male in the Battlefield audience instead of doing their presentation. The discussion gives Richard an epiphany about compression algorithms, and he stays up all night to code. He deletes most of the Pied Piper features and leaves only one – the all-important compression engine, which, using Richard's brand new compression code, achieves a Weissman score of 5.2. Pied Piper wins the Battlefield, embarrassing Belson and Hooli. After learning from Monica, amidst some flirting between the two, that Pied Piper will be fielding business interests and that things will only get harder, Richard has another panic attack and vomits into a dumpster in the alley.

== Reception ==
=== Critical response ===
On Metacritic, the first season has a score of 84 out of 100 based on 36 reviews. Similarly, Rotten Tomatoes gave the first season a 95% rating, and an average score of 7.9 out of 10 based on 57 reviews, with the critical consensus "Silicon Valley is a relevant, often hilarious take on contemporary technology and the geeks who create it that benefits from co-creator Mike Judge's real-life experience in the industry."

Tim Goodman of The Hollywood Reporter said "HBO finds its best and funniest full-on comedy in years with this Mike Judge creation, and it may even tap into that most elusive thing, a wide audience." Matt Roush of TV Guide said "The deft, resonant satire that helped make Judge's Office Space a cult hit takes on farcical new dimension in Silicon Valley, which introduces a socially maladroit posse of computer misfits every bit the comic equal of The Big Bang Theory's science nerds." Emily VanDerWerff of The A.V. Club said "It feels weirdly like a tech-world Entourage—and that's meant as more of a compliment than it seems." Brian Tallarico of RogerEbert.com praised the jokes but commented on the slow character development in the first two episodes, and the reliance on common stereotypes in technology, including "the nerd who can't even look at a girl much less talk to her or touch her, the young businessman who literally shakes when faced with career potential". He goes on to state that the lack of depth to the characters creates "this odd push and pull; I want the show to be more realistic but I don't care about these characters enough when it chooses to be so".

David Auerbach of Slate stated that the show did not go far enough to be called risky or a biting commentary of the tech industry. "Because I'm a software engineer, Silicon Valley might portray me with my pants up to my armpits, nerdily and nasally complaining that Thomas' compression algorithm is impossible or that nine times F in hexadecimal is 87, not 'fleventy five' (as Erlich says), but I would forgive such slips in a second if the show were funny." Auerbach claimed that he used to work for Google, and that his wife also worked for them at the time of the review.

=== Accolades ===
At the 72nd Golden Globe Awards, the show was nominated for Best Series (Musical or Comedy). For the 66th Primetime Emmy Awards, the series received five nominations, including Outstanding Comedy Series, Outstanding Directing for a Comedy Series (Mike Judge for "Minimum Viable Product"), Outstanding Writing for a Comedy Series (Alec Berg for "Optimal Tip-to-Tip Efficiency"), Outstanding Art Direction for a Contemporary Program (Half-Hour or Less), and Outstanding Main Title Design.

== Home media ==
The first season was released on DVD and Blu-ray on March 31, 2015; bonus features include eight audio commentaries and three behind-the-scenes featurettes.
