= Intellectual Property (disambiguation) =

Intellectual property is a category of property that includes intangible creations of the human intellect.

Intellectual Property may also refer to:

- Intellectual Property (film), 2006 American film
- Intellectual Property (album), 2023 album by American pop rock band Waterparks
- "Intellectual Property" (Silicon Valley), episode of American television series Silicon Valley
- "Intellectual Property" (Sports Night), episode of American television series Sports Night
