= Silicon Valley season 2 =

Silicon Valley
- Season 2
- Promotional poster
- Starring: Thomas Middleditch; T.J. Miller; Josh Brener; Martin Starr; Kumail Nanjiani; Amanda Crew; Zach Woods; Matt Ross; Suzanne Cryer; Jimmy O. Yang
- No. of episodes: 10

Release
- Original network: HBO
- Original release: April 12 – June 14, 2015

Season chronology
- ← Previous; Season 1 Next → Season 3

The second season of the American comedy television series Silicon Valley premiered in the United States on HBO on April 12, 2015. The season contained 10 episodes, and concluded on June 14, 2015.

The season picks up immediately following Pied Piper's victory at TechCrunch Disrupt. Seeking a Series A investment, they are courted by Laurie Bream (Suzanne Cryer)—who replaced Peter Gregory at Raviga Capital after his death—among other venture capital firms. Hooli CEO Gavin Belson (Matt Ross) sues Pied Piper, alleging that Richard (Thomas Middleditch) created the algorithm on Hooli property during company time. Richard eventually decides to work with Russ Hanneman (Chris Diamantopoulos) instead.

== Cast ==
=== Main ===
- Thomas Middleditch as Richard Hendricks
- T.J. Miller as Erlich Bachman
- Josh Brener as Nelson "Big Head" Bighetti
- Martin Starr as Bertram Gilfoyle
- Kumail Nanjiani as Dinesh Chugtai
- Amanda Crew as Monica Hall
- Zach Woods as Donald "Jared" Dunn
- Matt Ross as Gavin Belson
- Suzanne Cryer as Laurie Bream
- Jimmy O. Yang as Jian-Yang

=== Recurring ===
- Chris Diamantopoulos as Russ Hanneman
- Ben Feldman as Ron LaFlamme
- Bernard White as Denpok
- Andy Daly as Doctor
- Alice Wetterlund as Carla Walton
- Patrick Fischler as Dr. Davis Bannercheck
- Ping Wu as Henry
- Matt McCoy as Pete Monahan
- Aly Mawji as Aly Dutta
- Scott Prendergast as Scott
- Jill E. Alexander as Patrice
- Brian Tichnell as Jason
- Anna Khaja as Rachel

== Episodes ==
No. overall	No. in season	Title	Directed by	Written by	Original release date	U.S. viewers (millions)
9	1	"Sand Hill Shuffle"	Mike Judge	Clay Tarver	April 12, 2015	2.13
Pied Piper learns of Peter Gregory's death and question Raviga Capital's viability for their Series A funding. Bachman and Richard pitch Pied Piper to numerous venture capitalists who are trying to woo them, and find that being rude leads to better reception. Meanwhile, Raviga's partners select Laurie Bream as their new managing partner, whose eccentricity resembles Gregory's. Monica learns that Pied Piper is the firm's only hope for survival. Firms deliver their term sheets and as Erlich makes a selection, Bream and Monica deliver a better offer: $20 million at a $100 million valuation. Monica later warns Richard against taking a high amount, as they will be unable to secure further funding without increasing their valuation. At Gregory's funeral, Richard chooses Raviga for a $10 million investment at a $50 million valuation, surprising Bream who accepts. The funeral is attended by many, including the founders of Snapchat and Gavin Belson. As Belson speaks about his relationship with Gregory, Richard receives a message informing him that Hooli is suing Pied Piper for intellectual property theft.
10	2	"Runaway Devaluation"	Mike Judge	Ron Weiner	April 19, 2015	1.73
With the threat of Hooli's lawsuit, Laurie Bream decides to drop Pied Piper from Raviga Capital's portfolio. Richard and Erlich meet with the other venture capitalists, who are no longer interested due to the lawsuit and their earlier behavior. Meanwhile, Dinesh meets with his cousin Wajeed who is crowdfunding an app called Bro, which is similar to Yo but instead sends the word "bro". After hosting a crowdfunding party and a $500 donation from Gilfoyle meant to irritate Dinesh, Wajeed meets his goal of $50,000. Jared finds a venture capitalist on the Bro app, but when they meet it turns out to be a "brain rape" scam to steal their algorithm, causing Erlich and Jared to quickly end the presentation. With no options left but to hire a "cheap" lawyer for $2.5 million, Gavin Belson calls Richard and asks to meet him privately. At a bar, Belson proposes Hooli acquiring Pied Piper and bringing Richard back into the Hooli team, noting that Richard is currently forming the exact type of "soulless" corporation he despises. As Richard begins to respond, a mariachi band interrupts them, and the episode ends.
11	3	"Bad Money"	Alec Berg	Alec Berg	April 26, 2015	1.94
Though his colleagues disapprove, Richard reluctantly agrees to take Monica's advice and let Hooli acquire Pied Piper. However, Russ Hanneman, a flashy billionaire who made his money by putting radio on the Internet (a parody of Mark Cuban), offers Richard $5 million for equity in Pied Piper and two seats on its board. Monica warns Richard that Hooli is the safer option and that Hanneman is a terrible person, but Richard ignores her. Monica informs Bream who expresses disgust at the idea of being associated with Hanneman. Now funded, Pied Piper begins creating a budget for the next 18 months, and negotiating how many new people they will hire. Hanneman arrives and disrupts the budget meeting by talking loudly on the phone and hanging out with his friend Cory. Erlich tries to befriend Hanneman but fails. Hanneman tells Pied Piper that revenue is a bad thing, that the check he gave them is just a "show check", and buys several Pied Piper billboards without asking. Meanwhile, Belson compares the treatment of billionaires to the suffering of Jews in the Holocaust during an interview, manages the backlash, and gets his lawyers to figure out how to improve his case for suing Pied Piper.
12	4	"The Lady"	Alec Berg	Carson Mell	May 3, 2015	1.75
Pied Piper interviews new coders Jared Patakian, who identifies as a cyborg, and Carla Walton, a friend of Dinesh and Gilfoyle. With the introduction of Patakian, Jared Dunn is called "Other Jared", shortened to "OJ". OJ hires Carla and begins enforcing company human-resources policies. Erlich discourages Richard from hiring Patakian who had earlier spurned a job at Aviato, while Carla tortures Gilfoyle and Dinesh by suggesting that she makes more money than them. Pied Piper has a board meeting at Hanneman's house, and Bachman sides against Richard to order $30,000 in promotional merchandise from Hanneman's other companies. Later, Richard decides to hire Patakian despite Erlich's disapproval, but quickly discovers that Patakian had only entertained their job offer to get a better offer from another company. Meanwhile, to improve his lawsuit, Belson promotes Big Head to be Co-head Dreamer on the Hooli XYZ project to make him appear to have been the driving force behind Pied Piper. Big Head is given a massive office and an assistant, but suspiciously no responsibilities, while Davis Bannercheck, a pioneer of robotics, is named the other Co-head Dreamer and leads operations at the lab.
13	5	"Server Space"	Mike Judge	Sonny Lee	May 10, 2015	1.53
Richard is suffering from night sweats, a result of stress that could lead to bedwetting. He searches for office space, to separate work and life and accommodate for growth. The team tours an office neighboring a modeling agency, leading Dinesh to suggest leasing it. Richard asks the team to begin setting up servers, but Pied Piper has been blacklisted from major hosting providers due to pressure from Hooli. Gilfoyle notes that the providers would eventually be unable to meet their needs and suggests building their own servers, requiring the money for the office lease, so the team stay in Erlich's house. The parts delivery draws suspicions from neighbor Noah, who threatens to report their zoning violation after a mistake by Dinesh temporarily cuts power to the neighborhood. He backs down after Bachman and Richard discover he is illegally keeping ferrets and leases his guest house to Jared. Meanwhile, Belson is more concerned with grudges than innovation at Hooli XYZ, blatantly ignoring Bannercheck's concerns about Big Head's progress. Bannercheck resigns and Big Head becomes the sole Head Dreamer of Hooli XYZ.
14	6	"Homicide"	Mike Judge	Carrie Kemper	May 17, 2015	1.54
Hooli launches Nucleus by using it to broadcast a major mixed martial arts (UFC) event. The demo fails miserably. Pied Piper use the opportunity to show off their technology by partnering with Homicide energy drink, owned by a former classmate of Erlich's, and broadcasting a publicity stunt. Dinesh and Gilfoyle notice that Blaine, the stunt driver, has miscalculated his ramp speed and will likely be killed attempting the stunt. Blaine arrogantly refuses to listen to their concerns. Belson, caught short by the Nucleus failure, worries that he has surrounded himself with sycophants who only tell him what he wants to hear. Gilfoyle and Dinesh debate the morality of letting Blaine kill himself performing the stunt. Later, Blaine comes in to apologize and sees the SWOT analysis they performed posted on the wall, becoming highly offended. Richard discovers that Homicide omitted the Pied Piper logo from the broadcast and the partnership falls apart. Already set up, Richard agrees to broadcast a live stream of a condor egg. The Homicide stunt is broadcast with the logo of End Frame, the rival company that tricked the group into revealing their algorithm.
15	7	"Adult Content"	Alec Berg	Amy Aniobi	May 24, 2015	1.60
The team from Pied Piper storms into the offices of End Frame to accuse them of stealing the Pied Piper algorithm. End Frame responds that since they have a finished platform and a sales team, that ultimately they will beat Pied Piper. Gavin Belson holds a board meeting to discuss the failure of the launch of their Nucleus product. He then meets with the engineers and begs them to come up with something new and radical. Russ Hanneman informs Richard and Erlich that due to bad investments he is no longer a billionaire and now Pied Piper must come up with a way to become profitable. Gilfoyle obtains the details of End Frame's service contract with Intersite, a porn company. Richard meets the CEO of Intersite at a conference and convinces her to consider Pied Piper for the contract. Big Head meets with Belson to explain some exciting new technology, but adds that it will not be available until their grandchildren's time. The episode ends with Pied Piper and End Frame being brought to Intersite offices for a "bake off" to determine who will get the contract.
16	8	"White Hat/Black Hat"	Alec Berg	Daniel Lyons	May 31, 2015	1.78
Belson urges restraint on Nucleus publicity at a board meeting, without admitting the project's difficulties. Belson realizes that he may need a scapegoat, and convinces Bannercheck to return to Hooli and head Nucleus. However, he quits as soon as he assesses the project. Richard learns that Seth Lee, End Frame's network security engineer, was fired, presumably over Gilfoyle breaching their security. Feeling guilty, Richard tries to console Seth, who threatens to hack Pied Piper for revenge. Richard is worried and Dinesh warns that Richard has admitted to being a "black hat" and needs to be careful. Richard makes peace with Seth, but when he says Gilfoyle was unconcerned Seth feels insulted and renews his threats. Pied Piper begins transferring data from Intersite for the bake-off. Hanneman arrives to celebrate and stressed Richard becomes angry at his interruption and shouts at him. Intersite's CTO frantically informs them that Pied Piper is deleting all of their data. They wrongly conclude that Seth is behind the fork bomb though Gilfoyle cannot figure out how; eventually they find that Hanneman had put a tequila bottle down on the delete key of a laptop. Intersite angrily dismiss Pied Piper.
17	9	"Binding Arbitration"	Mike Judge	Dan O'Keefe	June 7, 2015	1.87
Big Head finds a prototype Nucleus phone left by the "brogrammers" and, stunned at how bad it is, provides it to Richard for helping him advance at Hooli. To prevent the press from learning about the phone, Belson drops the lawsuit in favor of binding arbitration. Pied Piper are represented by Pete Monahan, who works cheap as he was disbarred due to suspected sex crimes. During discovery, Monahan learns that Richard had used a Hooli computer to run a single test of Pied Piper, and by his employment contract Hooli thus owns the rights to Pied Piper. Hooli's lawyers try to build up Big Head as the modest genius who invented Pied Piper. However, a slip by Bachman leads Hooli to realize that the "girlfriend" Richard had "dropped off at the Apple store" was actually his laptop. Hooli calls Richard as a witness, and he admits that he used a Hooli computer. Meanwhile, the museum providing the video of the condor egg decides to remove the camera due to low viewership, but the technician taking it down falls and becomes trapped with the camera in a ravine. Viewership of the feed spikes while the team awaits the results of the arbitration.
18	10	"Two Days of the Condor"	Alec Berg	Alec Berg	June 14, 2015	2.11
Belson reveals that he would've paid $250 million for Pied Piper. Erlich questions the value of his incubator and considers selling until he learns the house would be demolished. The video feed of the injured technician goes viral, forcing Gilfoyle, Dinesh, Jared and Erlich to scramble; despite a fire and other setbacks, they keep the feed online until the technician is rescued. The arbitration judge rules that per Richard's employment contract Hooli would own Pied Piper's intellectual property. Richard then instructs the team to delete Pied Piper's code before Hooli can seize it. However, the judge continues that Hooli's claim is nullified by an illegal non-compete clause and Richard, whose phone runs out of battery, races to the incubator to prevent the deletion. He arrives too late but the deletion program crashes before any damage is done. Word spreads at Hooli, where over half of the employee contracts are invalid. Belson is called to meet with Hooli's board of directors. Big Head's promotions lead Denpok to begin mentoring him. Meanwhile, Raviga buys out Hanneman's stake in Pied Piper, making him a billionaire again, and securing three of five board seats. Raviga then removes Richard as CEO of Pied Piper.

== Production ==
In April 2014, HBO renewed the series for a second season. In October 2014, it was reported that Rebecca Creskoff had been cast as a series regular as Laurie Bream; however, in January 2015, it was announced that the role had been recast with Suzanne Cryer. In November, it was reported that Chris Diamantopoulos had been cast in the recurring role of Russ Hanneman. Beginning with this season, Jimmy O. Yang and Matt Ross were promoted to series regulars after having recurring roles in the first season.

== Reception ==
=== Critical response ===
On review aggregator Rotten Tomatoes, the season holds a 96% approval rating. It holds an average score of 8.5/10 based on 23 reviews. The site's critical consensus reads "Silicon Valley re-ups its comedy quotient with an episode that smooths out the rough edges left behind by the loss of a beloved cast member." Similarly, on Metacritic, which uses a weighted average, holds a score of 86 out of 100, based on 9 reviews, indicating "universal acclaim".

Jeff Jensen of Entertainment Weekly, who gave the season an A rating, described it as "smart and snide", saying that "the show's actors imbue their geeky cut-outs with winsomely flawed humanity that allows us to care about them even as they undercut each other and themselves in their pursuit of success and significance. Pied Piper may never reach greatness, but Silicon Valley seems ready to." For The Hollywood Reporter, Tim Goodman praised the season as "impressively upgraded after a stellar first season".

One focus for critics was the show's replacement for Christopher Evan Welch, who died during the production of season 1. In Vulture, Matt Zoller Seitz praised Welch's replacement, Suzanne Cryer, saying "both the character and the actress are excellent – at once reassuringly familiar and off-putting in ways that don't register right away". Less enthusiastic, Brian Tallerico on RogerEbert.com described Cryer's character Laurie Bream as a "fill-in character".

=== Accolades ===
For the 73rd Golden Globe Awards, the series was nominated for Best Series (Musical or Comedy). The series also received seven nominations at the 67th Primetime Emmy Awards, including Outstanding Comedy Series, Outstanding Directing for a Comedy Series (Mike Judge for "Sand Hill Shuffle"), and Outstanding Writing for a Comedy Series (Alec Berg for "Two Days of the Condor"), Outstanding Production Design, Outstanding Single-Camera Picture Editing, and Outstanding Sound Mixing.

== Home media ==
The second season was released on DVD and Blu-ray on April 19, 2016; bonus features include six audio commentaries, a behind-the-scenes featurette, and deleted scenes.
