= Dick Costolo =

American businessman (born 1963)

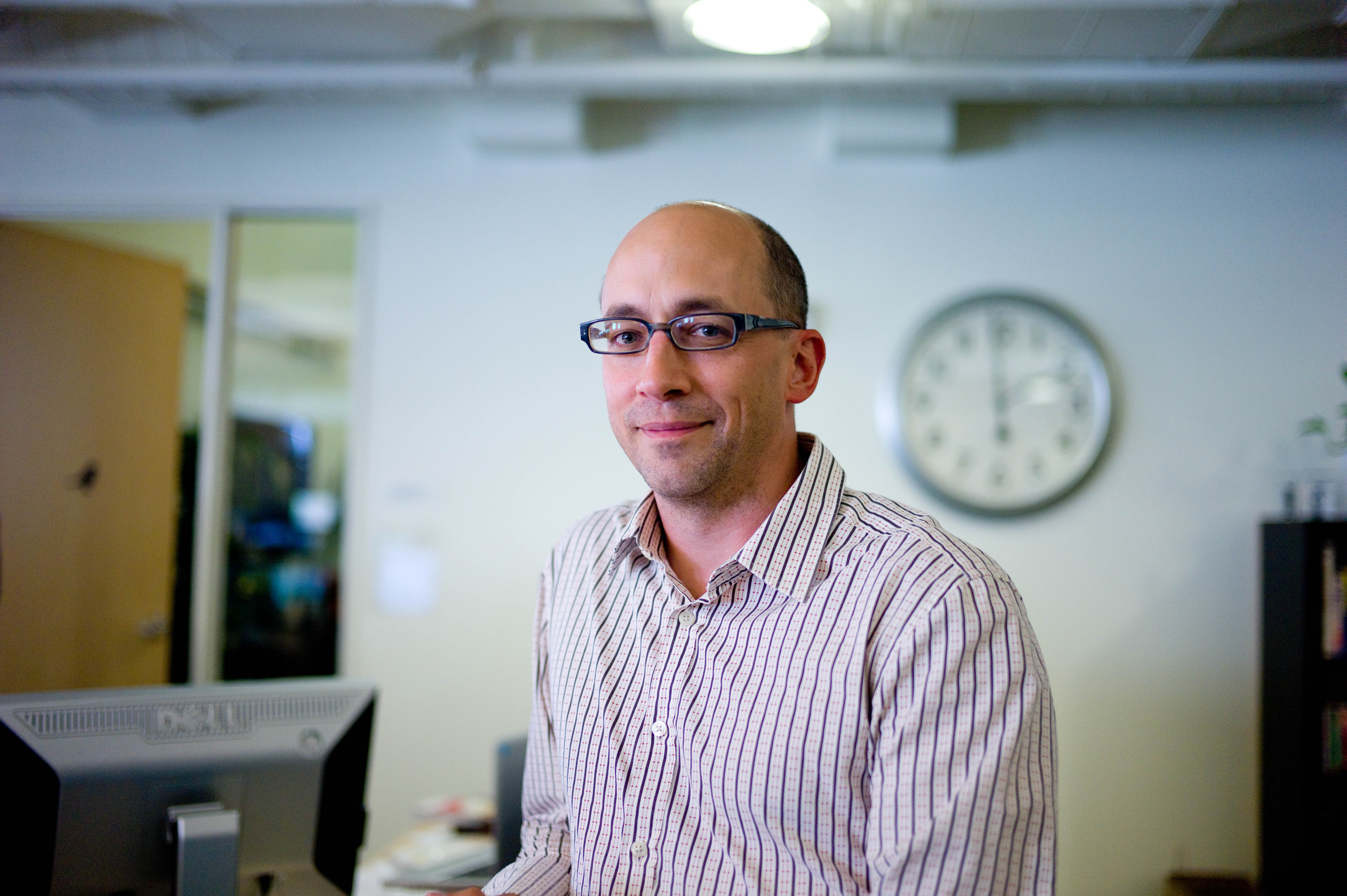
- D. Costolo, 2010
- Born: Richard William Costolo; September 10, 1963 (age 62); Royal Oak, Michigan, U.S.
- Education: University of Michigan (BS)
- Occupation: CEO of Twitter until July 1, 2015

Richard William Costolo (pronounced: /ˈkɒstəloʊ/) (born September 10, 1963) is an American businessman. He was the CEO of Twitter, Inc. from 2010 to 2015; and was the COO before that.

== Career ==
Costolo was born in Royal Oak, Michigan. In 1985, he earned a Bachelor of Science degree in computer and communication sciences from the University of Michigan. Upon graduation, he decided not to accept offers from technology companies and instead moved to Chicago to work in improvisational comedy.

After his improv career in Chicago, Costolo was at Andersen Consulting for eight years, where he was a senior manager in product and technology groups. He then co-founded Burning Door Networked Media, a web design and development consulting company, which was acquired by Digital Knowledge Assets in October 1996. He then co-founded SpyOnIt, a web page monitoring service, which was sold to 724 Solutions in September 2000.

In 2004, Costolo, along with Eric Lunt, Steve Olechowski, and Matt Shobe, founded the web feed management provider FeedBurner. After Google bought FeedBurner in 2007, Dick Costolo became an employee of the search giant. After the acquisition, Costolo began working in other areas of Google. In July 2009, he left Google, and in September 2009 it was announced that he was joining Twitter as its COO. Although his 2010 takeover as CEO was supposed to be temporary, while CEO Evan Williams was on paternity leave, it eventually became a permanent position. In 2011, he would notably proclaim about Twitter, “We're the free speech wing of the free speech party.”

In May 2011, it was announced that President Obama had appointed Costolo to the National Security Telecommunications Advisory Committee, along with the Corporate Vice President of Microsoft's Trustworthy Computing Group, Scott Charney, and McAfee President of Security David DeWalt.

In January 2012, he was embroiled in the Stop Online Piracy Act (SOPA) controversy after commenting on Wikipedia's planned blackout. He stated, "That's just silly. Closing a global business in reaction to single-issue national politics is foolish."

In 2013, Business Insider referred to him as "one of Silicon Valley's most impressive CEOs", and Time magazine named him one of the 10 Most Influential U.S. Tech CEOs. Costolo gave the 2013 spring commencement address to the University of Michigan graduating class on May 4, 2013.

In 2015, an internal Twitter memo by Costolo was leaked in which he said he was "frankly ashamed" at how poorly Twitter handled trolling and abuse, saying, "We suck at dealing with abuse and trolls on the platform and we've sucked at it for years", and admitted Twitter had lost users as a result.

On June 11, 2015, it was announced that Costolo would step down as CEO on July 1, 2015, and would be replaced by Twitter co-founder and chairman Jack Dorsey on an interim basis until the Board of Directors could find a replacement. On August 8, 2015, The New York Times reported that Costolo would be leaving Twitter's Board of Directors by the end of the year or when a new CEO was appointed.

In October 2015, Costolo was announced as a consultant for the HBO TV series Silicon Valley. He was featured in two episodes of the series, episode 8 season 3 and the finale season 6.

In December 2015, Costolo announced that he joined the board of directors for Patreon, a startup that helps artists raise money for their creative projects.

In January 2016, Costolo announced that he will launch a fitness startup along with Bryan Oki, CEO of Fitify. The two co-founders are "building a software platform that reimagines the path to personal fitness."

In February 2016, Costolo joined Index Ventures as a partner.

== Controversy ==
In October 2020, some of Costolo's tweets faced controversy. In a thread he posted criticizing Coinbase, a cryptocurrency company, and their CEO Brian Armstrong for refusing to participate in certain social and political movements such as Black Lives Matter, Costolo tweeted:

Me-first capitalists who think you can separate society from business are going to be the first people lined up against the wall and shot in the revolution. I'll happily provide video commentary.

— Dick Costolo

Business positions
Preceded by Evan Williams	Twitter CEO; 2010–2015	Succeeded by Jack Dorsey
