= Minimum Viable Product (Silicon Valley) =

- Silicon Valley episode
- Episode no.: Season 1 Episode 1
- Directed by: Mike Judge
- Written by: John Altschuler; Dave Krinsky; Mike Judge
- Original air date: April 6, 2014
- Running time: 29 minutes

Guest appearances
- Herschel Boone as Himself; Jared Cohen as Himself; Andrew Daly as Dr. Crawford; Aly Mawji as Aly Dutta; Scott Prendergast as Himself; Eric Schmidt as Himself; Brian Tichnell as Jason; Jessica Wagner-Cowan as Artist; Bernard White as Denpok; Robert "Kid Rock" Richie as Himself; Matt Ross as Gavin Belson

Episode chronology
| ← Previous — | Next → "The Cap Table" |

"Minimum Viable Product" is the pilot episode of the television comedy Silicon Valley. It originally aired on HBO on April 6, 2014. The episode was written by series creators John Altschuler, Dave Krinsky and Mike Judge and directed by Judge.

== Plot ==
Richard Hendricks (Thomas Middleditch) is a shy, reclusive programmer working for Hooli, a large tech corporation headquartered in Silicon Valley. He lives in a house in Palo Alto that serves as a Business incubator run by Erlich Bachman (T.J. Miller), an entrepreneur who founded the tech company Aviato before selling it years ago. Other cohabitants include Nelson "Big Head" Bighetti (Josh Brener), Hendricks's coworker at Hooli, system architect Bertram Gilfoyle (Martin Starr), and Java programmer Dinesh Chugtai (Kumail Nanjiani). Richard is working on a side project called "Pied Piper", an application that tracks songs to help musicians avoid copyright infringement. The app is dismissed by Erlich, who tells Richard to either pursue more innovative ideas or move out of the incubator.

While at the Hooli campus, Richard pitches Pied Piper to two "brogrammers", who dismiss and taunt him. Richard proceeds to pitch the project to Peter Gregory (Christopher Evan Welch), a venture capitalist who also awkwardly dismisses him. Richard would end up pitching the app to Gregory's assistant Monica (Amanda Crew) instead. While running through the application, the brogrammers are stunned by the efficiency and flawlessness of the app's compression algorithm. This is noticed by Hooli VP Jared Dunn (Zach Woods), who notifies CEO Gavin Belson (Matt Ross). Richard is then contacted by Belson, who offers to buy his app, peaking his offer at $10 million for the rights to the application. While meeting with Gavin, Richard receives a call from Gregory, who offers him $200,000 for 5% of Pied Piper. Overwhelmed with the offers, Richard heads out and suffers a panic attack before heading to a clinic.

Outside the clinic, Richard finds Monica, who informs him that everyone is fighting for control of the algorithm, not the app: Belson wants the algorithm under his control and intends to shut down Pied Piper after the acquisition. Under Gregory, Richard could grow Pied Piper into the business he wants it to be while directing its future. Richard returns to the incubator and tells the incubees he is taking Gregory's offer and receives Erlich's blessing. Richard proceeds to recruit Big Head, Gilfoyle, and Dinesh to join the Pied Piper team.

== Production ==
After Mike Judge graduated from UCSD with a degree in physics, his first job was as a programmer working on the F-18 fighter. In 1987 he moved to the Silicon Valley region of Northern California and joined Parallax, a startup video card company with about 40 employees. Disliking the company's culture and his colleagues ("The people I met were like Stepford Wives. They were true believers in something, and I don't know what it was"), Judge quit after less than three months, but the experience gave him the background to later create a show about the region's people and companies.

Filming for the pilot began on March 12, 2013, in Palo Alto, California. HBO green-lit the series on May 16, 2013. Kid Rock appeared in the episode as a personal favor to Judge, who said "Rock sort of owed me one. I'd done a Beavis And Butt-head thing for him for free that he used on his Jumbotrons on tour in 2011"; the cameo was inspired by a tech company's party Judge had attended only because Run-DMC were performing, with Judge stating that "it was just a lot of disinterested tech people standing around. It seemed like an odd juxtaposition."

The first two episodes of Silicon Valley were screened for critics in January 2014 during the Television Critics Association annual tour. Contra Costa Times critic Chuck Barney observed "several big, hearty laughs".

After the original broadcast, HBO briefly made the episode available for free on YouTube.

== Reception ==
The episode was viewed by two million viewers. The episode received generally positive reviews. The A.V. Club graded it a B+, praising the casting and regarding the writing as "consistently sharp". Slate called it "sharp, very funny".

Media in the San Francisco Bay Area also praised the episode. San Francisco Chronicle editor David Wiegand called it "not only the best show about the culture-dominating tech world to date but one of best new shows of the season." SF Weekly critic Katy St. Clair praised the plot development and humor. For the Contra Costa Times, Chuck Barney observed that the episode "certainly goes out of its way to skewer the superrich tech titans" for being "smug and pompous".

For this episode, Mike Judge was nominated for a Primetime Emmy Award for Outstanding Directing for a Comedy Series at the 66th Primetime Emmy Awards and also received a nomination for a Directors Guild of America Award for Outstanding Directing – Comedy Series at the 67th Directors Guild of America Awards.
