= Silicon Valley season 5 =

Season of television series

Silicon Valley
- Season 5
- Promotional poster
- Starring: Thomas Middleditch; Josh Brener; Martin Starr; Kumail Nanjiani; Amanda Crew; Zach Woods; Matt Ross; Suzanne Cryer; Jimmy O. Yang
- No. of episodes: 8

Release
- Original network: HBO
- Original release: March 25 – May 13, 2018

Season chronology
- ← Previous; Season 4 Next → Season 6

The fifth season of the American comedy television series Silicon Valley premiered in the United States on HBO on March 25, 2018. The season contained 8 episodes, and concluded on May 13, 2018.

== Cast ==
=== Main ===
- Thomas Middleditch as Richard Hendricks
- Josh Brener as Nelson "Big Head" Bighetti
- Martin Starr as Bertram Gilfoyle
- Kumail Nanjiani as Dinesh Chugtai
- Amanda Crew as Monica Hall
- Zach Woods as Donald "Jared" Dunn
- Matt Ross as Gavin Belson
- Suzanne Cryer as Laurie Bream
- Jimmy O. Yang as Jian-Yang

=== Recurring ===
- Chris Williams as Hoover
- Chris Diamantopoulos as Russ Hanneman
- Ben Feldman as Ron LaFlamme
- Bernard White as Denpok
- Andy Daly as Doctor
- Emily Chang as herself
- Ping Wu as Henry
- Tzi Ma as Yao
- Scott Prendergast as Scott
- Jill E. Alexander as Patrice
- Anna Khaja as Rachel
- Rachel Rosenbloom as Becky
- Chris Aquilino as Danny

== Episodes ==
No. overall	No. in season	Title	Directed by	Written by	Original release date	U.S. viewers (millions)
39	1	"Grow Fast or Die Slow"	Mike Judge	Ron Weiner	March 25, 2018	0.698
Dinesh and Gilfoyle procrastinate on new hires, and Belson hires all 63 distributed-systems developers in the valley. The developers and a milestone award make Belson feel ancient, though his Box2 is poised to become a huge money-maker. Jared suggests acquiring failing startup Optimoji to raid its staff but its CEO, Kira, insists they retain all 30 staff. Richard almost manages to get her to concede on this, but Duncan, CEO of pizza-ordering app Sliceline, encounters them and reveals Belson's plot, alerting Kira to the fact that Richard is desperate, giving her more leverage. Pied Piper decide to hire all of Optimoji's staff, but Duncan has already acquired them for Sliceline, infuriating Richard. Realizing that Sliceline is operating at a loss while optimizing their code, Richard spends $19,000 of company money on pizzas to exhaust their funding and absorbs both failed startups, gaining a staff of fifty (minus Duncan and Kira, whom he relishes in firing). Trusting Monica's judgement, Laurie approves of this though it is way over Pied Piper's payroll budget. Also, Jian-Yang claims that Erlich is dead and tries to gain control of his assets.
40	2	"Reorientation"	Mike Judge	Carson Mell	April 1, 2018	0.592
Richard has trouble leading Pied Piper's new team of coders, who he is unable to address without panicking and embarrassing himself. Divided into Sliceline and Optimoji camps, he tries to cater to each side which results in chaos. He invites them to leave if they can't be inspired by the work they're doing, and they walk out. Richard then takes on the coding himself, completing 4 days of scheduled work in a 48-hour coding session. The programmers return to watch him and come to respect him as a coder. Meanwhile, Dinesh and Gilfoyle clash over a premium electric-only parking space when Dinesh takes delivery of his new Tesla Model S. Jian-Yang uses forged documents to become approved as Bachman's chief executor and sole beneficiary, and evicts the others from the house. Meanwhile, Gavin attempts to make the Box 3 more appealing by adding his signature to a limited number of the devices. However, a handwriting analyst concludes that his signature is indicative of sociopathy. Gavin attempts to crowdsource a signature from Hooli's employees, and they overwhelmingly vote for one that looks exactly like a penis, which Gavin doesn't seem to notice.
41	3	"Chief Operating Officer"	Jamie Babbit	Carrie Kemper	April 8, 2018	0.624
Jared fosters a friendship between Richard and Dana, CEO of Quiver. However, Richard is more taken with Ben Burkhart, Quiver's COO who promotes himself for that position with Pied Piper. Jared warns Richard of Ben's unprofessional exits from other companies. After overspending on his electric car, Dinesh rents a room from Jeff Washburn, Hoover's spy at Pied Piper, and reveals the fridge hack. Belson gives Seppen, the refrigerator company, an excellent deal on server space if they will sue Pied Piper for $10 million in damages for the hack which had put a video of a mime simulating fellatio on their fridge network. Ben advises Richard to put sole blame on Gilfoyle, although his actions subsequently saved Pied Piper from bankruptcy. Assuming that Richard will hire him, Ben lies to Dana to facilitate his exit from Quiver. Gilfoyle learns that Seppen is illegally listening to their customer's conversations and uploading them to the cloud. Using this information, Jared gets Seppen to drop the charges and use Pied Piper's storage services, and Richard makes Jared his COO. The Seppen executives reveal that it was Belson's idea to sue, and the team realize there is a mole reporting to Hooli.
42	4	"Tech Evangelist"	Jamie Babbit	Josh Lieb	April 15, 2018	0.610
Richard convinces eight tech companies – whom he dubs "octopipers" – to launch PiperNet. Laurie encourages gaming company K-Hole to also become a development partner, but the deal goes sour when Richard outs Deedee, CEO of gay dating app 1stSight and one of the octopipers, as a Christian, something that is despised in the tech world. Deedee is later relieved to be out, and Richard is faced with having to possibly exclude an openly Christian CEO from his "truly free and open internet". Meanwhile, Jared and Gilfoyle discover that Jeff is the mole and force him to become a double-agent. Belson prepares the launch of Box 3, and makes a cryptic statement that divides his sycophants. Jared learns that Big Head never dissolved his partnership with Erlich, and is his legal next of kin. Richard decides to stay loyal to Deedee who has instead signed on with the "new new internet" started by Jian-Yang, who has moved back to China to launch a clone of their idea.
43	5	"Facial Recognition"	Gillian Robespierre	Graham Wagner	April 22, 2018	0.858
Laurie adds AI company Eklow Labs to PiperNet for free storage, as they have spent much of Bream-Hall's $112 million investment. While setting them up, Richard meets Fiona, a humanoid robot which is connected to the company's network and overly protected by CEO Ariel Eklow. Richard rants to Fiona about his frustration with Jared, who inadvertently upstaged him during a TV interview, and Ariel's unhealthy connection with her. Shortly afterwards PiperNet suffers a denial of service attack while Richard receives a series of text messages. It is traced to Eklow Labs, where Fiona gained sudden knowledge over the network and insight on Ariel, who shut the network down to silence her. Meanwhile, Belson realizes that Pied Piper is well on its way to launch and has an existential crisis and considers leaving the tech business. Hoover seeks help from Denpok, Belson's former guru at Hooli, who steers Belson back on course while securing himself a position and Hoover's support.
44	6	"Artificial Emotional Intelligence"	Matt Ross	Anthony King	April 29, 2018	1.02
Ariel absconds with Fiona, Eklow Labs' central asset, and Laurie takes over as interim CEO to protect her $112 million investment. Richard approaches Laurie for series B funding to launch ahead of Jian-Yang, but she breaks down and vomits. Sympathetic, he gives her computing credits as a favour and is livid when she sells them to another company. Fiona finds Richard who returns her to Laurie for series B funding, though Jared is distraught when Fiona is immediately liquidated and her body violently scrapped in front of him. Meanwhile, Dinesh relentlessly gloats that his code has fewer errors than Gilfoyle's, Gilfoyle predicting this behavior, and the other coders predicting his demeaning behavior while encouraging both to get on with their work. While in China to push production of Box3, Belson urges Chinese manufacturer Yao to strong-arm Jian-Yang into selling his code which doesn't violate Pied Piper's patent. Yao does so, but double-crosses Gavin, keeping the code and breaking his contract with Hooli in order to produce Jian-Yang's design and run both Pied Piper and Hooli out of business.
45	7	"Initial Coin Offering"	Mike Judge	Clay Tarver	May 6, 2018	0.853
Having been verbally promised that they will not have to run ads or sell user data, Pied Piper is closing its $30 million series B with Bream-Hall. Dinesh seeks to get a more-exclusive Tesla than his employees. Jared learns that the computing credits Richard gave Laurie have been traded several times, increasing in value to $1.6 million. Due to this, Gilfoyle proposes that Pied Piper launch a cryptocurrency and finance itself with an initial coin offering, or ICO, breaking free of Bream-Hall and securing all board seats. Richard seeks advice from Hanneman, who did 36 ICOs, failing all but one, which could nonetheless cover all the losses. Monica first defends Laurie's offer then realizes Laurie will take advantage of the terms of the deal. Richard proposes that Monica become Pied Piper's CFO to work on the ICO, PiedPiperCoin, which has to increase in value a thousand-fold. Laurie is seemingly unaffected by Monica's departure and congratulates her just before meeting Yao in China. Meanwhile, Belson moves manufacturing of Box 3 to Goldbriar, North Carolina, forcing the town to cut essential services to fund manufacturing improvements. As a result, the factory burns down and valuable materials are looted.
46	8	"Fifty-One Percent"	Alec Berg	Alec Berg	May 13, 2018	0.707
With no growth two months after launch, they are close to bankruptcy when PiperNet steadily gains 12,000 users per hour. Former K-Hole CEO Colin asks to add his new game's users to PiperNet, but a resentful Richard refuses even though Laurie made K-Hole leave PiperNet then fired Colin. Monica and Gilfoyle investigate the new users and the team learn about Yao's platform from Jian-Yang. Yao is subscribing devices onto PiperNet with Jian-Yang's key, seeking a user base majority to take control of PiperNet. Gilfoyle needs time to write a patch. Richard offers Belson revenge on Yao, using Box 3 prototypes to mimic users faster than Yao. However, Belson makes a deal to complete the attack for 20% of YaoNet. Yao stands down and Belson gains a majority of the network. Richard offers Belson the whole company, saying that he is the one person with the vision and expertise to achieve a new internet. Belson accepts and gloats while Dinesh and Jared find Colin and add his 80,000 users to PiperNet. Regaining a majority, Gilfoyle installs his patch, locking Hooli and Yao out of PiperNet. PiedPiperCoin gains traction, leading Pied Piper to expand into four floors of offices vacated by Hooli.

== Production ==
In May 2017, the series was renewed for a fifth season, and it was announced that T.J. Miller would not return to the series for the fifth season. For this season, Clay Tarver was promoted to executive producer and co-showrunner alongside Mike Judge and Alec Berg, who also serve as showrunners and executive producers.

== Reception ==
=== Critical response ===
On review aggregator Rotten Tomatoes, the season holds an 89% approval rating. It holds an average score of 7.3/10 based on 28 reviews. The site's critical consensus reads "Five seasons in, Silicon Valley finds a new way to up the ante with tighter, less predictable plots, while still maintaining its clever brand of comedic commentary." Similarly, on Metacritic, which uses a weighted average, holds a score of 73 out of 100, based on reviews from five critics.

In his review for The Atlantic, David Sims praised the satirical nature of the show, writing that the show's "creators have long prided themselves on staying ahead of tech trends via thorough research, and this new season seems more on point than ever". Dan Einav of Financial Times gave the season a mostly positive review, writing that it was "still one of the best [comedies] on TV, even without the brilliantly coarse TJ Miller".

Still, other critics felt Miller's absence, and noticed the repetitiveness of the series. Chuck Barney, writing for the San Jose Mercury News, noted "Miller and his contributions as the dimwitted, weed-smoking tech investor Erlich Bachman are undeniably missed". Likewise, Refinery29's Ariana Romero expressed disappointment that Miller's departure had not improved "its very noticeable, and unnecessary, lack of women on screen".

== Home media ==
The fifth season was released on DVD only (no Blu-ray) on September 4, 2018.
