= Silicon Valley season 6 =

Silicon Valley
- Season 6
- Promotional poster
- Starring: Thomas Middleditch; Josh Brener; Martin Starr; Kumail Nanjiani; Amanda Crew; Zach Woods; Matt Ross; Suzanne Cryer; Jimmy O. Yang; Chris Diamantopoulos
- No. of episodes: 7

Release
- Original network: HBO
- Original release: October 27 – December 8, 2019

Season chronology
- ← Previous; Season 5

The sixth and final season of the American comedy television series Silicon Valley premiered in the United States on HBO on October 27, 2019, and concluded on December 8, 2019. It consisted of 7 episodes.

== Cast ==
=== Main ===
- Thomas Middleditch as Richard Hendricks
- Josh Brener as Nelson "Big Head" Bighetti
- Martin Starr as Bertram Gilfoyle
- Kumail Nanjiani as Dinesh Chugtai
- Amanda Crew as Monica Hall
- Zach Woods as Donald "Jared" Dunn
- Matt Ross as Gavin Belson
- Suzanne Cryer as Laurie Bream
- Jimmy O. Yang as Jian-Yang
- Chris Diamantopoulos as Russ Hanneman

=== Recurring ===
- Chris Williams as Hoover
- Bernard White as Denpok
- Arturo Castro as Maximo Reyes
- Ben Feldman as Ron LaFlamme
- Helen Hong as Tracy
- Henry Phillips as John Stafford
- Nandini Bapat as Gwart

=== Guest ===
- Sam Liccardo as himself (cameo appearance)

== Episodes ==
No. overall	No. in season	Title	Directed by	Written by	Original release date	U.S. viewers (millions)
47	1	"Artificial Lack of Intelligence"	Mike Judge	Ron Weiner	October 27, 2019	0.448
Richard is questioned by Congress regarding data collection and promises that Pied Piper, now a large company with 500 employees, will never collect user data and that they are creating a decentralized internet. Jared worries about the new changes, as he is no longer working with Richard closely and his office is on the other side of building. Richard learns from Colin that they are indeed collecting data from their customers, including recording their conversations via their gamer headsets. Hooli's merger with Amazon is approaching and Gavin is furious to learn that their properties will be rebranded. Richard has Gilfoyle use his new compression and inference API to index all the recorded conversations. Wanting Colin out, Richard and Jared blackmail him with the indexed conversations which detail Colin's terrible behavior which includes stealing from the company. However, Colin turns it around on them and impresses his board members by presenting the API as a fantastic tool for data mining. Jared returns to the Hacker Hostel where he meets Gwart, a new programmer.
48	2	"Blood Money"	Mike Judge	Carson Mell	November 3, 2019	0.383
Colin has inserted ads into Gates of Galloo. Jared resigns from Pied Piper, now that the company has significantly changed. He instead wants to help Gwart, the eccentric new programmer at the Hacker Hostel. All of Hooli's major apps have been consumed by Amazon and Gavin is given three months by his board members to recoup their investments. Pied Piper's head of HR, Tracy, tricks Gilfoyle into catching up on his backlog of work. Tracy tries to assign Gilfoyle five coders, but he insists on doing all the work himself. At a charity event, Monica and Richard bump into Laurie Bream, who is now the CEO of YaoNet and has moved the company to the US. Richard later speaks with Maximo Reyes, a shady Chilean businessman who is interested in Pied Piper. The next day, he offers Richard $1 billion for 10% of Pied Piper. Richard asks Monica for advice, but she leaves the decision to him. Richard goes to the Hacker Hostel to ask Jared for advice, but once Richard insults Gwart, Jared chases him out of the house. Richard then meets with Maximo who makes it clear to Richard that he wants to invest in his company but they will mine data, vaguely threatening him if he declines.
49	3	"Hooli Smokes!"	Liza Johnson	Sarah Walker	November 10, 2019	0.459
Richard declines the $1 billion offer from Maximo much to the chagrin of Dinesh and Gilfoyle. The move was meant to gain enough money to move Pied Piper forward without Colin and his data-collecting online game, their main source of income. However, Colin ends up selling his game to Maximo. Pied Piper thus loses both of them. Distraught, Richard walks through the park only to bump into his arch-rival Gavin Belson, head of Hooli. Gavin's multi-billion dollar search giant is on the verge of collapse. Richard spills his troubles to Gavin and proposes they help each other. Gavin declines and leaves to use the information he learned from Richard to buy out Gwart's app. Horrified, Jared then approaches Pied Piper with the details of the buyout which reveals how little Hooli is valued these days. Richard proposes they buy Hooli. While Gavin is participating in a triathlon, Richard and the Pied Piper inner circle rush to the Hooli board members to get them to sign the buyout.
50	4	"Maximizing Alphaness"	Liza Johnson	Daisy Gardner	November 17, 2019	0.452
Pied Piper has taken over former tech giant and rival Hooli, and with it Richard's former manager, Ethan. Although valuable for his tech and leadership skills, Ethan publicly mocks Richard by bringing up embarrassing incidents from his days as a new Hooli employee. Richard takes Dinesh's advice to assert his role as CEO. Monica, after successfully negotiating Pied Piper's buyout of Hooli, seeks to join a 'Women in Tech' forum. Although she has no desire to join female empowerment groups, it includes her former boss Laurie and other influential movers and shakers. Gilfoyle must manage former Hooli employee John, who may be his equal. Meanwhile Hooli's founder and former CEO, Gavin Belson has left the tech world to write a Roman à clef. Jared, whose troubled childhood in a series of abusive foster homes is often alluded to, finally meets his birth parents.
51	5	"Tethics"	Pete Chatmon	Lew Morton	November 24, 2019	0.311
Richard is incensed that after years of standing up to Gavin Belson on ethical issues, he has been one-upped when Gavin creates the "Tethics" pledge. Richard vows to expose Gavin's hypocrisy while his co-workers and advisers urge him to sign the pledge. Meanwhile, Gilfoyle and Monica are accused of being bad managers. They engage in a contest to see who can win the favor of their co-workers. However, they both dislike being nice to their co-workers and team up to end the feedback program entirely. Jared has returned to Richard's side and is now attempting to gaslight his former protege Holden. The brash and ultra-confident billionaire investor Russ Hanneman returns to Richard to convince him to install free internet infrastructure for his RussFest event.
52	6	"RussFest"	Matt Ross	Carrie Kemper	December 1, 2019	0.414
Pied Piper is turned down for a massive deal with AT&T and Richard keeps the news a secret, just as the company is gearing up for RussFest, a festival in the desert funded by the brash, impulsive billionaire Russ Hanneman. Richard promises that Pied Piper can create an entire infrastructure for the festival using his unproven decentralized internet concept. This includes running all systems on the network including using smartphones for all purchases such as pay toilets, food and water plus a giant hologram of Russ. But the network keeps slowing down during the festival causing fears of a total failure which could result in a blackout with angry, rioting festival-goers. Meanwhile, Jared cannot stop thinking about Gwart, the eccentric genius programmer he served before she was hired away by Pied Piper's rival YaoNet. Jian-Yang creates a fake girl's coding camp as his latest unethical scheme, using Pied Piper's name and claiming to be original Pied Piper investor Erlich Bachman.
53	7	"Exit Event"	Alec Berg	Alec Berg	December 8, 2019	0.454
After Richard uses an AI to self-improve Pied Piper's network, the company closes a deal with AT&T. However, days before the launch, he notices a discrepancy with the network's data transfer system. Gilfoyle tells him the AI has improved the network's efficiency so much, it has learned to decrypt several strong encryption schemes, threatening global privacy and security. The group decides to intentionally botch the launch by shipping faulty code—but Dinesh refuses to participate, saying he can't watch his greatest success become his greatest failure. On launch day, Gabe reverts the code, forcing Dinesh to upload the faulty code by himself. Pied Piper's launch fails, shutting down cities worldwide as rats flood the streets. In a documentary ten years later, Richard is now a professor at Stanford University, Big Head is Stanford's president, Dinesh and Gilfoyle own a cybersecurity firm, Monica scoffs and denies working for the NSA when asked about it, Jared works at a nursing home, Gavin Belson is a romance novelist, Laurie is serving prison time, and Jian Yang has stolen Erlich's identity and fled to a foreign country with his fortune. Richard says he still has a copy of the original privacy-violating Pied Piper code on a flash drive but can't find it.

== Production ==
In April 2018, it was announced that HBO had renewed the series for a sixth season. In May 2019, HBO confirmed that season six would be the final season and that it would consist of seven episodes; the show had production delays to accommodate producer Alec Berg, who ran the HBO comedy series Barry.

== Reception ==
On review aggregator Rotten Tomatoes, the season holds a 94% approval rating, with an average rating of 7 out of 10 based on 18 reviews. The site's critical consensus reads, "Though the strangeness of reality threatens to one-up it, Silicon Valley's final season is funny, fearless, and still playing by its own rules to the very end." On Metacritic, the season has a score of 78 out of 100 based on 4 reviews.
