= Exit Event =

- Silicon Valley episode
- Episode no.: Season 6 Episode 7
- Directed by: Alec Berg
- Written by: Alec Berg
- Original air date: December 8, 2019
- Running time: 48 minutes

Guest appearances
- Alec Berg as documentarian; Emily Chang as herself; Dick Costolo as himself; Jim Cramer as himself; Ben Feldman as Ron LaFlamme; Craig Frank as Michael Eisenberg; Bill Gates as himself; Andre Iguodala as himself; Conan O'Brien as himself; Joel Swetow as Rod Morgenstern; Kara Swisher as herself

Episode chronology
← Previous "RussFest"	Next → —

"Exit Event" is the series finale of the comedy series Silicon Valley. The episode was written and directed by Alec Berg and originally aired on HBO on December 8, 2019. In the episode, the Pied Piper team attempts to sabotage the company's Billion-dollar launch in order to prevent the decentralized system from potentially abolishing internet privacy.

== Plot ==
After their surprising success at RussFest, Pied Piper strikes a $100 million dollar deal with AT&T to build their decentralized internet on their platform. As the team celebrates, Monica (Amanda Crew) gives Richard (Thomas Middleditch) a framed screenshot of their text conversation as a gift. However, Richard discovers that one of the text messages he sent containing a punctuation error was auto-corrected, although messages between Monica and him were encrypted. Richard spends the night trying to find out how the correction was made and tells the team about it the next morning. The team realizes that PiperNet's AI compression abilities have become so advanced that it can bypass numerous advanced encryptions, potentially eradicating all privacy measures. Realizing the severity of its potential, Gilfoyle (Martin Starr) proposes that the only way to prevent PiperNet from abolishing privacy is to sabotage it at its launch. After initial opposition, Richard reluctantly agrees to sabotage PiperNet. Dinesh (Kumail Nanjiani) opts out from the effort, thinking that his pride would prevent the sabotage from going through.

On the day of the launch at Salesforce Tower, Gilfoyle sets up faulty code that will sabotage the launch through widespread disruption of satellite signals. But back at Pied Piper headquarters, staff member Gabe discovers the faulty code and reverts it. He then gives Dinesh, who is outside the launch event, the thumb drive containing the faulty code. Dinesh physically heads to the top of the Tower through stairs and uploads the faulty code after a last-minute grant of access by Gilfoyle. The faulty code does not disrupt satellite signals but instead causes thousands of rats to emerge onto the streets of major cities across the country. Soon afterwards, Richard shuts down Pied Piper permanently in shame.

In a documentary produced 10 years after the PiperNet launch, the fates of the characters are shown: Richard has become a professor of technology ethics at Stanford University, where Big Head (Josh Brener) serves as President; Dinesh and Gilfoyle are running a large cybersecurity firm together; Monica is working for the NSA; Jared (Zach Woods) works at a nursing home; Russ Hanneman (Chris Diamantopoulos) has made his fortune back and now invests it in hair transplants; Laurie Bream (Suzanne Cryer) is serving time in prison for an unspecified reason, and Gavin Belson (Matt Ross) is a bestselling romance novelist. Jian-Yang (Jimmy O. Yang) has also fully assumed the identity of the late Erlich Bachman and has faked his own death to hide with his fortune in a foreign country. The Pied Piper team reunites at the Hacker Hostel, now occupied by another family, and sits around the old dining table where they used to work to play a game of "Always Blue" together.

The episode ends with Richard attempting to show the documentary crew the thumb drive containing the last remaining copy of the Pied Piper compression algorithm but struggles to find it as the credits roll.

The orange USB thumb drive is last seen plugged into computer equipment at the very top of the Salesforce Tower.

== Production ==
The episode was written and directed by Alec Berg, one of the show's executive producers. Berg also plays the documentarian interviewing the characters ten years after the initial PiperNet launch.

An extended version of the documentary showing the fate of the Pied Piper team ten years afterward can be viewed on YouTube.

== Reception ==
Les Chappell of The A.V. Club gave the episode an "A" rating, calling it "one of the darkest and most far-reaching episodes the series has ever put together" and "an episode that’s fully aware of its place in the series, winks and nods to the canon that lead it to a feeling of closure." Brian Lowry of CNN also gave the episode a positive review, calling the episode a fitting send-off that "carried with it an unexpectedly sobering cautionary tale about the dangers of technology run amok, and — in a timely hook — the moral responsibilities that go with operating in this lucrative playground."

Writing for Slate, Josephine Wolff criticized the episode for being too cynical in "dismissing tech ethics and the related academic field as a big, useless joke."
