= Archelis =

Wearable chair

Archelis (アルケリス arukerisu, from 歩ける椅子 arukeru isu, "walkable chair" in Japanese) is a wearable chair designed and manufactured by Yokohama-based mold factory, Nitto in association with Japan Polymer Technology, Chiba University's Center for Frontier Medical Engineering and Hiroaki Nishimura Design. The purpose of the chair is to aid industry workers and medical surgeons who must work long hours while standing. As of February 2016, it is specially designed for medical surgeons, allowing them to sit during physically demanding surgical operations, which reduces fatigue in surgeons.

== History ==
Patents for similar wearable devices date back more than four decades, which have since expired. Darcy Robert Bonner first filed the original patent for the invention in 1977, which was later granted as D249,987 in October 1978. In 2015, Swiss engineers came up with a similar product called Noonee, which is a hydraulic-powered exoskeleton made of a titanium frame. Noonee was tested on workers of German car manufacturing company, Audi.

== Function ==
The device, while worn, makes the angle of ankle and knee stable to enable a standing orientation such that the knees are moderately bent but without applying any effort on the legs and without exerting pressure on the joints. The body coercion is distributed to the shin and thigh, minimizing muscle fatigue.

The device can be locked into unassociated positions for each limb, allowing the user to stand in a comfortable position. The designers believe the device is ideal for medical surgeons who require prolonged standing during operations.

== Structure ==
The system involves no cell or power, made of carbon segments and materialized with hook and loop closures. The company noted that the device is comfortable to use for extended periods, thanks to the flexible carbon parts.

== Public ==
The wearable chair was under active development as of February 2016 and is currently not available for public purchase.

In seasons 5 and 6 of Silicon Valley, recurring character Gabe is always shown wearing an Archelis.
