= Silicon Valley season 3 =

Silicon Valley
- Season 3
- Promotional poster
- Starring: Thomas Middleditch; T.J. Miller; Josh Brener; Martin Starr; Kumail Nanjiani; Amanda Crew; Zach Woods; Matt Ross; Suzanne Cryer; Jimmy O. Yang
- No. of episodes: 10

Release
- Original network: HBO
- Original release: April 24 – June 26, 2016

Season chronology
- ← Previous; Season 2 Next → Season 4

The third season of the American comedy television series Silicon Valley premiered in the United States on HBO on April 24, 2016. The season contained 10 episodes, and concluded on June 26, 2016.

In the season, Richard once again becomes CEO of Pied Piper, after the excessive spending and questionable practices of Jack Barker, who briefly held the job. After leaving Pied Piper, Barker goes to work for Gavin Belson at Hooli. Erlich teams up with Big Head to create a new incubator, but the pairing quickly fails. Dinesh creates a video chat application within the Pied Piper platforms, which unexpectedly becomes popular.

== Cast ==
=== Main ===
- Thomas Middleditch as Richard Hendricks
- T.J. Miller as Erlich Bachman
- Josh Brener as Nelson "Big Head" Bighetti
- Martin Starr as Bertram Gilfoyle
- Kumail Nanjiani as Dinesh Chugtai
- Amanda Crew as Monica Hall
- Zach Woods as Donald "Jared" Dunn
- Matt Ross as Gavin Belson
- Suzanne Cryer as Laurie Bream
- Jimmy O. Yang as Jian-Yang

=== Recurring ===
- Stephen Tobolowsky as Jack Barker
- Chris Diamantopoulos as Russ Hanneman
- Chris Williams as Hoover
- Ben Feldman as Ron LaFlamme
- Milana Vayntrub as Tara
- Bernard White as Denpok
- Andy Daly as Doctor
- Alice Wetterlund as Carla Walton
- Emily Chang as herself
- Ping Wu as Henry
- Matt McCoy as Pete Monahan
- Annie Sertich as C.J. Cantwell
- Aly Mawji as Naveen Dutt
- Scott Prendergast as Scott
- Jill E. Alexander as Patrice
- Brian Tichnell as Jason
- Anna Khaja as Rachel

== Episodes ==
No. overall	No. in season	Title	Directed by	Written by	Original release date	U.S. viewers (millions)
19	1	"Founder Friendly"	Mike Judge	Dan O'Keefe	April 24, 2016	1.86
After failing to convince the board of directors to keep him on as Pied Piper CEO instead of demoting him to Chief Technology Officer, Richard threatens to quit and sue to regain his intellectual property. Richard meets with a company called Flutterbeam that wants to hire him as CTO. However, disappointed at how banal the project assigned to him would be, he rejects the offer and decides to stay with Pied Piper. Afterwards, Richard meets with Jack Barker, Raviga's choice for the CEO of Pied Piper. Meanwhile, at Hooli, Belson discovers that the now invalid employment contracts would allow him to fire affected employees without severance and take back unvested stock options. Belson fires the entire Nucleus team, and uses the profits from the reclaimed stock options to offer Big Head a $20 million severance package in exchange for non-disclosure and non-disparagement agreements.
20	2	"Two in the Box"	Mike Judge	Ron Weiner	May 1, 2016	1.72
Richard meets with the sales team at Pied Piper and realizes that plans for the platform are business-facing instead of consumer-facing. Referring to his experience of the Dot-com bubble, Jack explains to Richard that they need to make profit fast, and promises that he would never compromise the product, later explaining that by "product" he means the company's stock value. Richard tells the sales team what he wants the platform to be, but they want to remove Richard's features so it will be easier to sell to businesses. Later, the sales team show Richard a commercial for the product, and it's exactly what Richard does not want it to be. Meanwhile, Jared plans to move back into his condo, but the tenant refuses to leave or pay rent; as Erlich explains how difficult it is to evict a tenant, Jian-Yang decides not to accept the end of his own lease. At Hooli, Belson suggests to the engineers to alter the company's search algorithm so it doesn't display any negative stories about Nucleus, Hooli or himself. The Nucleus team crack the middle-out compression shortly before their contracts expire, and decide to take this knowledge with them.
21	3	"Meinertzhagen's Haversack"	Charlie McDowell	Adam Countee	May 8, 2016	1.69
The team visit the data center where Pied Piper box would be stored, with an engineer on site for 24/7 support. Appalled by this prospect, Richard continues to push for a platform instead of the box appliance, but Jack refuses. Gilfoyle quits and begins to receive several job offers and gifts from recruiters. In an attempt to have Jack's decision reverted, Richard meets with Laurie who agrees with Richard's vision but is reluctant to fire a recently appointed senior CEO. In one of his job interviews, Gilfoyle learns that Endframe has hired two of the coders from Hooli, who cracked Richard's middle-out algorithm. Gilfoyle reports this to Pied Piper and they decide on a Skunkworks project: to secretly pursue the original vision for Pied Piper alongside working on the box appliance, seemingly complying with Jack's order. Jared refers to Meinertzhagen's Haversack, cautioning everyone to act inconspicuously, and to destroy all traces of their conspiracy. However, upon entering their office space the next morning, Richard trips, and incriminating documents which he had meant to shred are spread all over the floor and brought to Jack's attention.
22	4	"Maleant Data Systems Solutions"	Charlie McDowell	Donick Cary	May 15, 2016	1.89
Jack threatens to fire the team for developing the platform, but needs them to deliver a prototype box to Maleant. The team agrees to create a basic functioning box, after which they can create the platform. However, the team are unable to deliver a lesser product and their box exceeds all competitors. Meanwhile, Erlich searches for a new incubator prospect and discovers that Big Head has a nine-bedroom mansion where he hosts tenants for a share of their startups. Erlich talks Big Head into a partnership. In a board meeting on Maleant's box deal, Monica notices that it includes exclusive rights which would prevent launching the platform for five years. Laurie backs Jack's deal as the platform does not have proven value, but Monica votes against the deal and delays it. Belson later phones Richard, gloating that he acquired Endframe's middle-out compression platform for $250 million. However, by setting a price point on middle-out compression, Belson valued Pied Piper's platform well above the Maleant deal, and the team gain Laurie's backing. She fires Jack for undermining her and leaves the CEO position open, giving the team approval to work on the platform.
23	5	"The Empty Chair"	Eric Appel	Megan Amram	May 22, 2016	1.71
Jack spent almost all of Pied Piper's funding, and they won't get another installment until delivering the finished platform. They close the office, fire employees, and return to Erlich's incubator. Erlich drafts a partnership agreement for Bachmanity, which gives him control of Big Head's assets while retaining his Pied Piper shares. Richard confronts Laurie about a negative article on tech blog Code/Rag; Laurie agrees that he should speak with its author, C.J. Cantwell, after meeting with Raviga's PR head. However, Richard rants about Laurie to Cantwell, mistaking her for the PR head. She will only kill the story if he brings her a better one, which he gets from Big Head: how Belson secretly ordered his engineers to scrub Hooli's negative publicity from the Internet. Laurie confides to Monica that she was wrong to remove Richard as CEO and plans to reinstate him after going through the motions of a search so that the decision is perceived as being well considered. Richard is reappointed CEO. The team hires an engineering team of outsourced coders working remotely from around the world, at a fraction of the local cost.
24	6	"Bachmanity Insanity"	Eric Appel	Carson Mell	May 29, 2016	1.62
Belson faces public backlash from the Code/Rag story and demands Cantwell reveal her source, threatening legal action. Erlich throws a lavish Hawaiian-themed party at Alcatraz to launch Bachmanity while Big Head is concerned of losing his Hooli severance money for violation of his non-disclosure agreement. Erlich says he'll fix it, and buys Code/Rag for $500,000, while Big Head's business manager Arthur Clayman warns that he risks going bankrupt. Meanwhile, Richard starts dating Winnie, a coder for Facebook. Gilfoyle and Dinesh notice that Winnie uses spaces instead of tabs for coding, a technique which, they tell her, Richard despises. When she reveals this to him, Richard falsely denies it and turns the relationship sour. Dinesh flirts via video chat with Elisabet, one of Pied Piper's outsourced coders who lives in Estonia, but when he finally reveals himself she mentions her "boyfriend", while Gilfoyle mocks him. During the party, which Erlich dubbed "Bachmanity Insanity", Sasha, the party manager, tells Bachman that the supplier's checks have bounced. Right before the big speech, Clayman informs him that Bachmanity has gone broke.
25	7	"To Build a Better Beta"	Jamie Babbit	John Levenstein	June 5, 2016	1.70
Erlich and Big Head's firm, Bachmanity, is unable to pay its creditors following its million-dollar luau. Pied Piper anticipates an early launch following good rapport from their selective beta launch. One of the beta testers is revealed to be a Hooli spy when Gilfoyle adds a "God view" allowing them to pinpoint users' geographic locations. Erlich and Big Head discover that Big Head's former business manager embezzled $6 million. Erlich considers selling some of his Pied Piper shares to Laurie to settle the debts. Gilfoyle sends a compressed virus that destroys Belson's phone and laptop, and he shuts down power to the Hooli campus in fear of further damage. The principal (recently re-hired) developers of Nucleus resign, leaving the Hooli rebuild of Nucleus in a hiatus state. Gilfoyle decommissions "Anton", his server, while getting flak from Dinesh about his best friend being a piece of hardware. After a meeting with Laurie, Erlich gets a call about his debts being erased. Richard and team count the seconds down to the official public launch of the Pied Piper platform.
26	8	"Bachman's Earnings Over-Ride"	Jamie Babbit	Carrie Kemper	June 12, 2016	1.64
Pied Piper reaches 100,000 downloads in just 10 days, receiving significant media coverage and being hailed as the next unicorn of the tech world. Bachman conceals the fact that he sold his 10% share in Pied Piper, an insider stock dump that could signal uncertainty. Richard prepares a press release explaining Bachman's financial woes but Bachman protects Pied Piper with a sacrificial interview to Code/Rag. Bachman was poised to sell half his stock to Hanneman for $5 million but Laurie used her board majority to approve only a sale to herself of all of his stock for $713,000, just enough to cover his debts. Feeling responsible, Hendricks offers Bachman a job as Pied Piper's head of PR. Meanwhile, Belson is transitioned from CEO for spending three quarters of a billion dollars on Nucleus and Endframe with nothing to show for it, and Hooli begins carrying the Pied Piper app on the Hooli Store.
27	9	"Daily Active Users"	Alec Berg	Clay Tarver	June 19, 2016	1.63
Laurie hosts a cocktail party to celebrate 500,000 downloads of Pied Piper's platform. Richard reveals to Monica that the number of daily active users (DAU) is actually very poor, something that only he and Jared know. Realizing that their beta version was only reviewed by fellow engineers and tech-savvy users, Richard proposes introducing a series of seminars and tutorials about how to use the platform, which, ironically, is too advanced for regular users. Confronted with this, all of Pied Piper's recently employed staff quits, including a customer service rep who heads for an interview at Hooli. Sensing an opportunity, Belson interviews him and learns about Pied Piper's low number of DAUs. Later, he summons the board to announce that his intention was never to develop a platform, introducing Jack Barker as Hooli Endframe's new director and their new product: a box just like the one Barker planned for Pied Piper. The board reinstates Belson as CEO. Facing Pied Piper's apparent downfall, Richard tells Jared that he will dissolve the company. The following morning, however, the number of DAUs has risen sharply. Jared secretly paid for a click farm in Bangladesh to provide DAUs to the platform.
28	10	"The Uptick"	Alec Berg	Alec Berg	June 26, 2016	2.04
Belson uses an elephant at a Hooli board meeting and it dies on campus. He fires his assistant Patrice for opposing its secretive disposal, and she contacts Cantwell for an exposé. Richard learns of Jared's click farm operation, which Dinesh and Gilfoyle made undetectable. Erlich promotes Pied Piper and attracts a significant investment from venture capitalists Coleman Blair Partners. Jared discourages Richard from signing a deal based on fraudulent data, which Richard reveals to Erlich and Coleman Blair. Erlich is furious that Pied Piper has lost credibility to investors. Due to the scandal, Raviga offers its interest for sale to the highest bidder. Belson offers $1 million to buy it and extinguish the company. He also buys Code/Rag for $2 million in order to quash the elephant story. Monica, having been fired from Raviga for opposing Laurie, joins the team, which ultimately realizes that their video chat app, a side project by Dinesh, is considerably better than Hooli's. Big Head and Erlich, who owned half of Code/Rag through their partnership firm Bachmanity, use the money from the buyout to beat Gavin Belson's offer by one dollar, thus becoming the new owners of Pied Piper.

== Production ==
In April 2015, the series was renewed for a third season. In October 2015, it was reported that Stephen Tobolowsky had been cast in the recurring role of Jack Barker.

== Reception ==
=== Critical response ===
On review aggregator Rotten Tomatoes, the season holds a 100% approval rating. It holds an average score of 8.8/10 based on 24 reviews. The site's critical consensus reads "Silicon Valley's satirical take on the follies of the tech industry is sharper than ever in this very funny third season." Similarly, on Metacritic, which uses a weighted average, holds a score of 90 out of 100, based on reviews from 15 critics.

Rob Lowman of the Los Angeles Daily News, after the release of season three, described the show as "one of the best comedies on television", saying that the show "works as both a sharp satire on the tech industry and a commentary on art versus commercialism". Likewise, in Vanity Fair, Laura Bradley praised the show's ability to mix comedy and drama, writing "Silicon Valley has all the urgency of a high-stakes prestige drama, but at its core, it's a comedy about hapless goobers."

=== Accolades ===
In 2016, the series earned nine nominations at the 68th Primetime Emmy Awards, including for Outstanding Comedy Series, Outstanding Lead Actor in a Comedy Series (Middleditch), two for Outstanding Directing for a Comedy Series (Alec Berg for "Daily Active Users"; Mike Judge for "Founder Friendly"), two for Outstanding Writing for a Comedy Series (Dan O'Keefe for "Founder Friendly"; Alec Berg for "The Uptick"), Outstanding Casting for a Comedy Series, Outstanding Production Design, and Outstanding Sound Mixing.

== Home media ==
The third season was released on DVD and Blu-ray on April 11, 2017; bonus features include deleted scenes.
