= Silicon Valley season 4 =

Silicon Valley
- Season 4
- Promotional poster
- Starring: Thomas Middleditch; T.J. Miller; Josh Brener; Martin Starr; Kumail Nanjiani; Amanda Crew; Zach Woods; Matt Ross; Suzanne Cryer; Jimmy O. Yang; Stephen Tobolowsky; Chris Diamantopoulos
- No. of episodes: 10

Release
- Original network: HBO
- Original release: April 23 – June 25, 2017

Season chronology
- ← Previous; Season 3 Next → Season 5

The fourth season of the American comedy television series Silicon Valley premiered in the United States on HBO on April 23, 2017. The season contained 10 episodes, and concluded on June 25, 2017. This is the final season to feature T.J. Miller as Erlich Bachman.

== Cast ==
=== Main ===
- Thomas Middleditch as Richard Hendricks
- T.J. Miller as Erlich Bachman
- Josh Brener as Nelson "Big Head" Bighetti
- Martin Starr as Bertram Gilfoyle
- Kumail Nanjiani as Dinesh Chugtai
- Amanda Crew as Monica Hall
- Zach Woods as Donald "Jared" Dunn
- Matt Ross as Gavin Belson
- Suzanne Cryer as Laurie Bream
- Jimmy O. Yang as Jian-Yang
- Stephen Tobolowsky as Jack Barker
- Chris Diamantopoulos as Russ Hanneman

=== Recurring ===
- Chris Williams as Hoover
- Haley Joel Osment as Keenan Feldspar
- Ben Feldman as Ron LaFlamme
- Bernard White as Denpok
- Tim Chiou as Ed Chen
- Andy Daly as Doctor
- Emily Chang as herself
- Ping Wu as Henry
- Matt McCoy as Pete Monahan
- Scott Prendergast as Scott
- Jill E. Alexander as Patrice
- Anna Khaja as Rachel
- Jake Broder as Dan Melcher
- Phoebe Neidhardt as Mia

== Episodes ==
| No. overall | No. in season | Title | Directed by | Written by | Original release date | U.S. viewers (millions) |
|---|---|---|---|---|---|---|
| 29 | 1 | "Success Failure" | Mike Judge | Alec Berg | April 23, 2017 | 0.867 |
Pied Piper officially pivots to PiperChat, a video chat app created by Dinesh, which is steadily gaining users and is superior to all competitors. However, the team is unable to gain funding due to the scandal of their click farm upticks and demise of the compression platform. After clashing with Dinesh and Gilfoyle over the development of the app and attempting to gain investment from Hanneman, Richard realizes that he can't be the CEO of a project he doesn't believe in. Just as the team prepares to replace him with Big Head, he quits his position and signs over his equity in exchange for use of his algorithm and the Pied Piper brand in the pursuit of a more ambitious goal: a decentralized internet based on users and smartphones instead of large companies and mainframes. He suggests Dinesh become the CEO of PiperChat, which was his creation. Meanwhile, Gavin Belson and Jack Barker are returning from China after closing a deal to manufacture Hooli Endframe's box. Belson becomes irked that Jack diverts the plane for his own convenience while lying about it, and "promotes" Jack by assigning him a position at a desk in Hooli's data center, deep underground.
| 30 | 2 | "Terms of Service" | Mike Judge | Clay Tarver | April 30, 2017 | 0.762 |
PiperChat gathers attention from investors and a steady stream of daily active users (DAUs), while Richard keeps working on his "new internet" project. Richard finds that Dinesh has blocked him from PiperChat's data repository, violating a verbal agreement. After Big Head gives him login access, Richard learns that a third of PiperChat's users are children, and the app's terms of service never included parental permission. This violates the Children's Online Privacy Protection Act (COPPA) and can incur a total penalty of $21 billion. Meanwhile, Barker embraces his demotion to the data center underground, but Belson is suspicious and spies on his video chat sessions. Since Barker uses PiperChat, with unbreakable encryption, Belson determines to acquire the company. He accuses Dinesh of stealing Hooli Chat's tech and threatens lawsuits, demanding he sign over the company – without a legal assessment. Dinesh does so, knowing that this will make Hooli responsible for the $21 billion fine. Meanwhile, Erlich learns that Jian-Yang has investment meetings and makes a deal with him for 10% of his company; later, he finds out the app is not about Oculus VR but about recipes to cook octopus.
| 31 | 3 | "Intellectual Property" | Jamie Babbit | Carrie Kemper | May 7, 2017 | 0.774 |
Gavin Belson is fired following the disastrous acquisition of PiperChat. He is replaced by Jack Barker, who has found a way to avoid the COPPA fines. During Jian-Yang's pitch, Erlich convinces venture capitalists that Jian-Yang's app is actually a "Shazam for food". He hires Dinesh to help write a demo. Monica tricks Raviga's new rising star, Ed Chen, into making a sight-unseen offer for the app, but Chen quickly finds out that there is no product after speaking to Jian-Yang. As revenge, Chen has Monica put in charge of the investment. Big Head applies to Stanford University; he is rejected for enrollment, but the admissions officer invites him to be a guest lecturer based on his name recognition and executive experience. Meanwhile, Richard learns from Monica that Peter Gregory thought of a decentralized Internet in the 1990s, and gains access to his archives. He finds Gregory came to the same conclusions, but the compression wasn't good enough back then. Richard then realizes that this is the best manifestation for his compression algorithm. However, Richard discovers that the new Internet idea was patented by Gavin Belson when he was founding Hooli with Gregory and others.
| 32 | 4 | "Teambuilding Exercise" | Jamie Babbit | Meghan Pleticha | May 14, 2017 | 0.859 |
Gavin is reluctant to build Richard's idea, but agrees in order to get revenge on Hooli. Knowing his team would never work for Gavin, Richard assembles outside coders to build the platform, but adds Gilfoyle and Jared, who admit they want to be on the team. Jian-Yang tests his SeeFood app, but it only recognizes if something is a hot dog or not. Angry and dissatisfied with the work, he refuses to add more foods to the app. Erlich angrily snaps a picture of his penis, which the app recognizes as a hot dog. Jian-Yang spends all the initial funding on a Corvette. Erlich convinces Big Head to make his students train the image recognition neural net as an assignment. Immediately understanding Erlich's motive, they meet with Coleman Blair Partners and create their own food-based app instead, beating SeeFood to market. Considering his shares of Jian-Yang's app worthless, Erlich trades them for Jian-Yang's Corvette. However, Jian-Yang manages to use Erlich's penis picture to pivot the project as a filter for "dick pics" and Periscope acquires the app. Dinesh is brought into Periscope where his main duty is scrubbing pictures of penises from the Internet, for which he is mocked by Gilfoyle.
| 33 | 5 | "The Blood Boy" | Tim Roche | Adam Countee | May 21, 2017 | 0.844 |
Richard presents the business plan for the decentralized internet project, wanting a discreet launch beginning with a free compression app which will accumulate decentralized storage space on users' devices. Bryce, a jock who regularly donates blood to Belson, influences Belson to rethink the strategy. Richard and Jared warn Bryce not to interfere with their company. Belson demands that Richard apologizes, and he visits Bryce, eventually discovering that he actually consumes marijuana and sugary snacks and is not as healthy as Belson believes. Meanwhile, Erlich predicts that Ed Chen is planning to force Laurie out of Raviga. When Monica tries to warn her, Laurie says she knew about it and rewards Monica's loyalty with an invitation to be her partner on a new VC firm, as she had planned to exit Raviga with a number of investors. Dinesh is paranoid about Mia and doesn't have the courage to break up with her, so turns her in to the FBI for hacking access to the elevators at the Freedom Tower in New York City. Bryce gets a deal for a tell-all book about Belson who decides to leave Palo Alto, leaving Richard with ownership of the decentralized internet patent but no funding.
| 34 | 6 | "Customer Service" | Clay Tarver | Graham Wagner & Shawn Boxe | May 28, 2017 | 0.728 |
After a disturbing encounter with Hanneman, who urinates into Erlich's Corvette, Richard abandons searching for investors and tries to pre-sell cloud storage from their projected service. After several meetings fail because Belson left, they extort an insurance company FGI's CTO, Dan Melcher, the former TechCrunch judge Bachman twice cuckolded, to approve them. However, reviewing the tech late into the night, Hendricks ends up having sex with Melcher's new fiancée. Meanwhile, testing a prototype app, Dinesh and Gilfoyle's personal data is swapped onto each other's phones, leading to a tense standoff. While trying to prove he is still relevant, Erlich inadvertently crashes a meeting with Keenan Feldspar, an up-and-coming VR wiz, and brings him to Laurie and Monica's new firm, Bream-Hall, as leverage to get a job.
| 35 | 7 | "The Patent Troll" | Jamie Babbit | Andrew Law | June 4, 2017 | 0.862 |
Pied Piper's space saver app reaches the top 500 utility apps on the Hooli store. This makes them a target for elderly lawyer Stewart Burke who lives off royalties; he bought patents from a failed startup and is working his way up the list seeking settlements. Feeling they are being shaken-down, Richard rallies the next targets on the list to join together, but they turn on him and, with a stronger case from those settlements, Burke raises his demand from $20,000 to $300,000. Hendricks turns the tables by threatening Burke's copyright claims to gain a perpetual license. Bachman returns half of his finder's-fee for Feldspar for a salaried position at Bream-Hall. To network with his rivals, he accepts an invitation to a basketball game not realizing he is expected to play; he breaks his leg while trying to install a practice hoop. Gilfoyle uses Anton to hack Jian-Yang's annoying smart fridge.
| 36 | 8 | "The Keenan Vortex" | Jamie Babbit | Graham Wagner & Rachele Lynn | June 11, 2017 | 0.798 |
Keenan Feldspar put a rider in his contract so he can leave Bream-Hall if Erlich does. Due to a cold snap and consequent insurance claims, FGI has unexpected data processing requirements and the team faces a huge bill from their storage provider. Needing another client, they pitch to Feldspar. Dinesh and Gilfoyle are sucked into his VR project which they improve with middle-out compression. Feldspar offers to acquire Pied Piper; Richard tries to bluff with a valuation of $25 million, which Keenan accepts. Feldspar gets the money by pitching his improved VR to another firm, receiving triple Bream-Hall's advance, and convincing Erlich to quit. Monica warns Richard that Feldspar's VR tech is a bloated demo that can never be fully realized, which he is hyping for quick money. She promises to fund their series A round if they can implement the decentralized internet project on a sufficient number of smartphones. Feldspar sells his company to Hooli, the only other company with middle-out compression, as Barker's box2 faced setbacks and he desperately needs something to showcase at the upcoming Hooli-Con tech conference. Erlich is left out of the Hooli deal with nothing to show for it.
| 37 | 9 | "Hooli-Con" | Mike Judge | Chris Provenzano | June 18, 2017 | 0.840 |
Needing 123,000 new users, the team head to Hooli-Con, following Mia's advice to disguise their app as a Hooli download for free Wi-Fi at the event. Dinesh and Gilfoyle strategically place routers for maximum interception coverage; Hoover, Hooli's head of security, is suspicious and warns Barker who rebukes him for the distraction. Richard sabotages the screen saver of Winnie's new boyfriend, who reports it and triggers a response team which discovers some of the routers. The Pied Piper team attempt a workaround but are caught, and Jared is outraged at Richard for risking everything on something so petty. Hoover confronts them with CCTV evidence but lets them go as Richard once helped Belson hinder Barker's plans at Hooli. Pied Piper gains sufficient installs. However, Barker and Feldspar's keynote is a mobile demo of HooliVR, which causes a number of phones in the auditorium to explode. Meanwhile, Erlich deciding that he and Richard are forever cursed, decides to move to Tibet on Gavin Belson's invitation. When he gets there, Gavin is far from happy to see him.
| 38 | 10 | "Server Error" | Mike Judge | Dan O'Keefe | June 25, 2017 | 0.790 |
Gilfoyle confirms that fifty exploded phones had Pied Piper's app. Instead of a firmware update, Barker intends to replace 9 million smartphones in three days, at great expense. He tries to triple production with a motivational speech in China and is taken hostage by factory workers. Belson finds out and decides leave Tibet and go to China to try to get his company back. He invites Erlich, but Erlich is lazy and wants to smoke opium in his den. Gavin then gives his innkeeper enough money to house Erlich for five years and leaves Erlich in the Tibet den. Belson negotiates Barker's release, regaining the board's trust and his position as CEO. Meanwhile, during an attempt to move Pied Piper's network to their server, Anton, the incubator's broadband is cut for unpaid bills. Richard tries to move Anton to Stanford, but the server components fall out of the truck en route. They are surprised to find their network is still running all of FGI's data. Anton backed itself up to Jian-Yang's smart refrigerator, which Gilfoyle hacked with Pied Piper's code, and the code spread to other refrigerators creating a distributed network and proving their concept. Pied Piper agrees to funding from Bream-Hall.

== Production ==
In April 2016, the series was renewed for a fourth season.

The fourth season promotional poster was designed by visual artist and graphic novelist Daniel Clowes, who was commissioned by HBO to produce a poster in his iconic style.

== Reception ==
=== Critical response ===
On review aggregator Rotten Tomatoes, the season holds a 94% approval rating. It holds an average score of 7.6/10 based on 36 reviews. The site's critical consensus reads "Silicon Valley's fourth season advances the veteran comedy's overall arc while adding enough new wrinkles – and delivering more than enough laughs – to stay fresh." Similarly, on Metacritic, which uses a weighted average, holds a score of 85 out of 100, based on reviews from 10 critics.

Giving the season a B+ grade, Ben Travers of IndieWire praised the show's "renewed focus on the dangers of ambition", and writes that the fourth season "becomes a bit more thoughtful and bit more ambitious". In Vulture, Odie Henderson called the season the show's funniest yet.

Most of the season's criticisms noticed the show's repetitiveness, but often found the series funny nonetheless. Verne Gay of Newsday wrote, "There's a sense that we've traveled down this road paved with silicon once or twice before, but the ride is still smart, engaging, and highly informative." Still, when reviewing the season finale, Alex Riviello of Slash Film expressed disappointment that "the season squandered any forward momentum it promised with the premiere" Similarly, The Washington Post's Alyssa Rosenberg wrote that "The biggest problem with [the season finale episode] is obviously that it repeats the series' pattern of ending seasons".

== Home media ==
The fourth season was released on DVD and Blu-ray on September 12, 2017; bonus features include deleted scenes.
