= John Altschuler =

American screenwriter and producer

- Born: 1963 (age 62–63); United States
- Education: University of North Carolina
- Occupations: Screenwriter; Producer
- Years active: 1986–present

John Altschuler (born 1963) is an American screenwriter and television and film producer. He is known for his collaborative projects with Mike Judge and Dave Krinsky, most notably co-creating the HBO series Silicon Valley and serving as a showrunner and writer on Fox’s King of the Hill.

== Early life ==
Altschuler grew up in a Jewish family in Carbondale, Illinois. His mother was a homemaker and his father was a merchant seaman who became an anthropologist. In his early teens, his family moved to Greenville, N.C., followed by a move to Cary, N.C. He graduated from Cary High School in 1981.

Altschuler attended the University of North Carolina at Chapel Hill where he majored in economics and anthropology. While at UNC, he served on the staff of The Daily Tarheel newspaper. He also co-created and performed in the Half-Hour Comedy Show, the first comedy show produced by UNC Student Television, with fellow student Dave Krinsky. Altschuler recalls, "We’d have things like Bonnie and Clyde and Ted and Alice. We had a sketch called plant boy about a boy that was raised by wild plants."

Altschuler and Krinsky began collaborating on manuscripts for National Lampoon. Altschuler says, "National Lampoon…was kind of important back then meant a lot to me. And what I found out is that they didn’t accept unsolicited material. What do you do? So what Dave and I…put a packet together and we send it to the three editors who ran National Lampoon…. And I said I know you don’t accept career letters blah blah blah but here’s a little something for your time. And I enclosed a dollar with each letter." Editor Chris Simmons responded and accepted their pitch for an article about the woman who was charged with selling the drugs that killed actor John Belushi. Altschuler said," I kinda felt like she was being railroaded because they were blaming her. Now, this is an out-of-control actor. And so basically the premise of our first piece was that she was going to get out of prison and all of Hollywood was terrified because they thought, 'Oh my God!' …Richard Pryor was scared of what she was going to do to him because she obviously has this power." Ultimately, working for National Lampoon gave the duo the credibility they needed to be taken seriously by the television and film industry.

== Career ==
Altschuler and Krinsky moved to Hollywood, CA after graduating from UNC in 1985, and worked as drivers and production assistants for two years. His break came after being a P.A. for producer Howard Gottfried. One day Gottfried asked Altschuler, "What do you want to be." Upon learning that Altschuler was a writer, Gottfried asked to see his work. Eventually, Alschuler and Krinksy sold two movie scripts, and Altschuler was hired to adapt a short story by Somerset Maugham into a film for a Paris studio.

=== Television ===
Altschuler and Krinsky's break in television came in 1996 when they were hired as assistant producers for the HBO series The High Life.

==== King of the Hill ====
In 1997, the duo became writers for Fox’s King of the Hill, working there for thirteen years and serving as executive producer for its final seven seasons. Created by Mike Judge (Beavis and Butt-Head), King of the Hill was known for its satirical, rather slice-of-life, examination of social issues, including relationships with family and friendship, as well as loyalty, justice, and overall general American culture (including the state of Texas, in which the series takes place in). Of the animated show, Altschuler said, "You can't find an issue that is bedeviling our society that we haven't dealt with." North Carolina's Governor Mike Easley said, "This [King of the Hill] is the first show about the South since Andy Griffith that didn't make fun of the South." Regardless, Fox frequently bumped the show for athletic events and cancelled it for a short period in its 10th season. Altschuler said, "It used to be very frustrating, until we realized we do a show with great writers and great actors about really interesting subject matter, so let's just keep doing it and hope for the best." Despite having been cancelled for a short while, the show did end up being renewed for three more seasons at the last minute, until it was finally cancelled for good and replaced by Family Guy and American Dad! creator Seth MacFarlane's newest show The Cleveland Show (a spin-off in the Family Guy universe) in Fox's Sunday timeslot, with a few remaining episodes airing in syndication.

==== The Goode Family ====
In 2008, Altschuler, Krinsky, and Judge formed Ternion Productions, a film and television production company. In 2009, Ternion created The Goode Family, an animated show about left-wing vegans, for ABC. Altschuler said, "It's not about knocking it [the Green Movement] down. The idea for the show came from us all having these similar experiences where we're trying so hard to be good, and they keep changing the playing field. One of the epiphanies was the paper-or-plastic debate. Then I got a reusable bag, and I looked at it. It was made in China." After one season, The Goode Family was dropped by ABC, but picked up by Comedy Central. Altschuler indicated that Comedy Central was a better fit for the show than the more mainstream ABC because "The censorship standards at ABC are very tight…The Goode Family would have been a much better show if we didn't have to pussyfoot around neo-Nazi sensibilities." This show was generally disliked by critics from the Hollywood Reporter, New York Times, NPR, and the San Francisco Chronicle. Gina Bellefonte of the New York Times said it was, "aggressively off-kilter with the current mood." D. Carlson of the Hollywood Reporter said The Goode Family is "rough around the edges" and that there are "too many current pop culture references are scattered throughout the script, turning what could have been another gentle lampoon of wacky characters into something with a two-week shelf life." However, Joel Pitney of Enlighten Next wrote a more positive review of the show by saying, "I think the reviews miss a pretty significant point" and had called The Goodes "absolutely hilarious."

==== Beavis and Butt-Head ====
Along with Krinsky and Judge, Altschuler was the executive producer and writer for several episodes of MTV’s relaunch of Beavis and Butt-Head, called Mike Judge's Beavis and Butt-Head. One update to the animated show was that Beavis and Butt-Head critique television shows such as MTV's own Jersey Shore and 16 & Pregnant. A critic noted, the show was "still a rowdy, guilty hot" and that it "once again might be the best thing on the network."

==== Silicon Valley ====
In 2013, Altschuler, Judge, and Krinsky co-created the HBO series Silicon Valley. Although Judge worked in Silicon Valley prior to his television career, he said, "John Altschuler, a writer on King of the Hill, had an idea about doing a show like Dallas or Falcon Crest but instead of oil or wine money, it would be about tech money." One reviewer called Silicon Valley "one of the most acclaimed and celebrated comedy shows in Peak Television. Through its smart writing, a keen understanding of Silicon Valley's weird tech bubble, and witty performances from our talented ensemble, this [is a] foul-mouthed, confidently lewd, but unsuspectingly clever program." Altschuler said, "We went up to Silicon Valley and it was so funny because I studied anthropology and you started realizing this was a subculture." In 2013, Altschuler and Krinsky stepped back from Silicon Valley to focus on other projects for Ternion Productions.

==== History of the World ====
In 2016, Altschuler and Krinsky co-created and co-produced a docu-comedy for National Geographic called History of the World: Now We Know. The mini-series used "sketch comedy, animation, puppetry, documentary and archival footage to explore weighty questions," including sports, religion, money, evolution and more. It was NatGeo's first comedy series.

==== Lopez ====
In 2015, Altschuler, Krinsky, and Jeff Stilson co-created and co-produced the new sitcom, Lopez, for the comedian George Lopez. Lopez was filmed with a single camera. It premiered on TV Land on March 30, 2016, and was renewed for a second and final season. Although Lopez was fiction, one critic noted it features a "scarily realistic, take on Lopez's life… [depicting] his disconnect with the Hispanic community because of his Hollywood success and wealth accumulation." Another critic said Lopez was "unusually edgy for TV Land" and was "far from perfect."

==== Pilots ====
In 2017 through Ternion Productions, Altschuler and Krinsky produced an unsuccessful pilot for TNT that featured Geena Davis as a bounty hunter. In 2019, Altschuler and Krinsky were hired to adapt the novel,The Players Ball: A Genius, a Con Man, and the Secret History of the Internet’s Rise by David Kushner, for television. TBS has ordered a pilot for this which is about the beginnings of Match.com, an early dating website.

=== Film ===
Altschuler and Krinsky wrote screenplays for several feature films, including Blades of Glory (2007) starring Will Ferrell and Jon Heder, Role Models (2008) starring Paul Rudd and Seann William Scott, and Action Point (2018) starring Jackass stars Johnny Knoxville and Chris Pontius. Both Alschuler and Krinsky co-produced the film Extract (2009) starring Jason Bateman, Mila Kunis, Kristen Wiig, and Ben Affleck, and was also written directed by Judge. Through their company Ternion Productions, Altschuler and Krinsky also wrote scripts together for the unproduced CGI animated Woody Woodpecker feature for Illumination, the unproduced CGI animated Casper the Friendly Ghost feature for DreamWorks Animation from director Simon Wells, and the unproduced CGI animated Popeye the Sailor Man feature for Sony Pictures Animation from director Genndy Tartakovsky.

He also wrote Brigadier Gerard, an unproduced script for a feature film based on the short stories of Sir Arthur Conan Doyle. Alschuler says, "Everybody told me not to write a Napoleonic war comedy, [so I] sat down and wrote a Napoleonic war comedy. And we had Johnny Depp; …everybody in the world wanted to be this character. Well, we had the money. We had Steve Carell… We had Jay Roach to direct it. And [then] Steve Carell didn’t want to go to Europe. It was well within two years the world changed and the $53 million dollars went to $35 million went to $28 million. …Can’t make movies anymore. So I’ve converted them into these sort of limited series which I like, but I also I love movies."

=== Book ===
Along with Krinsky and Richie Stephens, Altschuler is the author of the book The Gangster's Guide to Sobriety (2022).

== Awards ==
Altschuler received five Primetime Emmy Award nominations for producing and writing, including Outstanding Comedy Series in 2014 and 2015 for Silicon Valley, and Outstanding Animated Program (less than one hour) in 2001, 2006 and 2008 for King of the Hill. Silicon Valley was also nominated for a Golden Globe Award.

Altschuler won an Environmental Media Award for King of the Hill, and the Audience Award at the SXSW Film Festival, along with Krinsky and Carson D. Mell, for writing the first episode of Silicon Valley.

== Personal life ==
In 1996, Altschuler married Leah Harris, of Wollaston, MA. They live in Studio City, California.
