= Dave Krinsky =

American film director

- Born: February 27, 1963 (age 62); Boston, Massachusetts, U.S.
- Occupations: Writer and producer
- Years active: 1986–present

David Krinsky (born February 27, 1963) is an American writer and producer.

== Early life ==
Born and raised in Boston, Massachusetts. He then moved with his family to Fort Lauderdale, Florida as a teen, later attended the University of North Carolina at Chapel Hill, and co-created the first student produced comedy show on UNC Student Television. He is Jewish.

== Career ==
Krinsky began his career as a writer for the humor magazine National Lampoon, together with John Altschuler, whom he met and began collaborating creatively with while at UNC Chapel Hill, which became a collaboration that continued in the years to come. After selling their screenplays to Warner Brothers, Universal and Studio Canal Plus, they moved to Hollywood and began working as assistant producers for the HBO series The High Life. In 1997, Altschuler and Krinsky became writers on King of the Hill. They worked there for 13 years and ran the show for the final seven seasons.

In 2008, they formed Ternion Productions, a film and television production company with Mike Judge. In 2009, Krinsky, Judge, and Altschuler co-created the show The Goode Family. In 2011, they executive produced and wrote several episodes of MTV’s return of Beavis and Butt-head.

Altschuler and Krinsky also co-wrote various features, including Blades of Glory, Action Point and Extract, of which Krinsky also served as an associate producer.

In 2013, Altschuler, Judge, and Krinsky co-created the HBO series Silicon Valley. They are also writing and producing Brigadier Gerard, a feature with Steve Carell attached to play Brigadier Gerard and Ricky Gervais attached to play Napoleon.

In 2015, Krinsky, Altschuler, and Jeff Stilson co-created the sitcom series Lopez, starring George Lopez. TV Land gave a 12-episode straight-to-series order in August 2015. The series premiered on March 30, 2016. On June 3, 2016, TV Land renewed Lopez for a second season.

Krinsky has received several Emmy nominations and has won an SXSW Film Award for his writing work on Silicon Valley, shared with Judge, Altschuler, and Carson D. Mell.
