= Christopher Evan Welch =

American actor (1965–2013)

- Christopher Evan Welch in Silicon Valley
- Born: September 28, 1965; Fort Belvoir, Virginia, US
- Died: December 2, 2013 (aged 48); Santa Monica, California, US
- Education: University of Dallas
- Occupation: Actor
- Years active: 1999–2013
- Spouse: Emma Roberts (m. 2008)
- Children: 1

Christopher Evan Welch (September 28, 1965 – December 2, 2013) was an American TV, film, and stage actor. He is best known as the narrator in Woody Allen's Vicky Cristina Barcelona and his role as Peter Gregory in the first season of the HBO series Silicon Valley. He died due to complications from lung cancer in Santa Monica, California, in 2013.

== Early life ==
Welch was born in Fort Belvoir, Virginia. He attended the University of Dallas on a full scholarship and was a graduate of the school's drama program. He attended graduate school at the University of Washington School of Drama in Seattle, under the direction of Jack Clay.

== Career ==
In 1999 Welch appeared in NBC’s Third Watch. He later appeared in the television series Law & Order: Special Victims Unit, the short film Custody, and the television film Hamlet. He then appeared in an episode each of The Practice, Law & Order: Criminal Intent, and Whoopi.

Welch had an extensive stage career. He appeared in several noted Off-Broadway productions, as well as in three Broadway shows.

In 2004, Welch appeared in the films Marie and Bruce, The Stepford Wives, and Keane. In 2005, he again appeared in Law & Order: Special Victims Unit, and also had roles in the films The Interpreter and War of the Worlds. In 2006, he had roles in the television shows, The Book of Daniel and The Sopranos, as well as the films The Hoax and The Good Shepherd.

Welch had roles in the 2008 films What Just Happened and Synecdoche, New York. He appeared as David Haig in the television series Law & Order from 2008 to 2010. In 2009, he appeared in the film Whatever Works and the television series Nurse Jackie. In 2010, he appeared as Grant Test in the AMC series Rubicon. In 2012, he appeared in The Master, and Lincoln as Clerk of the House Edward McPherson, as well as a role in the television series Elementary. In 2013, he also had a role in the films Syrup and Admission, with a role in the television series Golden Boy.

At the time of his death, he was filming his scenes as Peter Gregory in the HBO series Silicon Valley, having completed five episodes. Welch's character was not written out of the show until the second season. When Silicon Valley won the Critics' Choice Television Award for Best Comedy Series, creator Mike Judge dedicated the award to Welch, at the request of Welch's co-star T.J. Miller.

Welch narrated The Last Apprentice series audiobooks, a young adult fantasy series, for Harper Audio, as well as other audiobooks.

Welch sang in a rock band, the Ottoman Bigwigs.

== Death ==
On December 2, 2013, at the age of 48, Welch died due to complications of lung cancer at a hospital in Santa Monica, California.

Welch was surrounded by his wife Emma Roberts (m. 2008), their daughter, his parents, and his siblings.

== Filmography ==
=== Film ===
Year	Title	Role	Notes
2000	Chinese Coffee	Hamlet Actor	
2004	Marie and Bruce	Henry	
2004	The Stepford Wives	Ed Wainwright	
2004	Keane	Motel Clerk	
2005	The Interpreter	Jonathan Williams	
2005	War of the Worlds	Photographer	
2006	The Hoax	Albert Vanderkamp	
2006	The Good Shepherd	Photography Technical Officer	
2008	What Just Happened	Studio Marketing Guy	
2008	Vicky Cristina Barcelona	Narrator	Voice
2008	Synecdoche, New York	Pastor	
2009	Whatever Works	Howard	
2011	Our Idiot Brother	Robbie	Uncredited
2012	The Master	John More	
2012	Lincoln	Edward McPherson	
2013	Admission	Brandt	
2013	Syrup	Davies	

=== Television ===
Year	Title	Role	Notes
2000	Law & Order: Special Victims Unit	William Lexner	Episode: "Remorse"
2001	The Practice	Public Defender Bernard Shandley	Episode: "Payback"
2003	Law & Order: Criminal Intent	Dr. Thomas Dysart	Episode: "See Me"
2005	Law & Order: Special Victims Unit	Richard Dwyer	Episode: "911"
2006	The Book of Daniel	Scott Clarkson	Episode: "Forgiveness"
2006	The Sopranos	ER Doctor	Episode: "Join the Club"
2008–2010	Law & Order	David Haig	3 episodes
2009	Nurse Jackie	Skip Nannerine	Episode: "School Nurse"
2010	The Good Wife	Dr. Miner	Episode: "Doubt"
2010	Rubicon	Grant Test	12 episodes
2012	Elementary	Samuel Abbott	Episode: "Child Predator"
2013	Golden Boy	Neil Jacobs	Episode: "Sacrifice"
2014	Silicon Valley	Peter Gregory	6 episodes, (final appearance); Nominated—Critics' Choice Television Award for Best Supporting Actor in a Comedy Series
