= Suzanne Cryer =

American actress (born 1967)

- Born: January 13, 1967 (age 59); Rochester, New York, U.S.
- Education: Yale University (BA, MFA)
- Occupation: Actress
- Years active: 1992–present
- Children: 3

Suzanne Cryer (born January 13, 1967) is an American actress known for her roles as Ashley on the ABC sitcom Two Guys and a Girl and as Laurie Bream on the HBO original series Silicon Valley. She featured in "The Yada Yada", an award-winning and fan favorite episode of Seinfeld. She has also performed on Broadway.

== Early life ==
Cryer was born in Rochester, New York. She graduated from Greenwich High School in Greenwich, Connecticut in 1984 and then attended Yale University, where she attained a degree in English literature. She went on to study for a master's degree from the Yale School of Drama. During this time she spent a summer performing at the Utah Shakespeare Festival where her roles included Rosalind in As You Like It, and Anne in Richard III.

== Career ==
After graduation, Cryer appeared at Hartford Stage in The Rivals, Baltimore Center Stage in Don Juan, and began making guest appearances on television series. She won critical acclaim for her performance in the premiere of Donald Margulies's two-person play Collected Stories at South Coast Repertory. She then went on to film Wag the Dog while simultaneously performing in the West coast premiere of Arcadia at the Mark Taper Forum. Her next major role was that of Josie in Neil Simon's Proposals which began at the Ahmanson Theatre in Los Angeles and then toured the country before arriving on Broadway at the Broadhurst Theatre.

In 1997, Cryer made a guest appearance on an episode of Seinfeld in the episode "The Yada Yada." She played George's girlfriend Marcy, who frequently made use of the term "yada yada yada." In 1999, she joined the cast of the ABC sitcom Two Guys and a Girl (the show's second season) as Ashley Walker, a love interest for Berg (Ryan Reynolds). She became a series regular and remained with the show until it ended in 2001. She made two appearances on Frasier as Roz Doyle's sister, Denise, in the episodes "The Guilt Trippers" and "Sea Bee Jeebies."

In recent years, she returned to theater to play Tracy Lord in The Philadelphia Story at Hartford Stage, and appeared in Christopher Shinn's play What Didn't Happen at Playwrights Horizons.

She made appearances in the television series Dexter, CSI: Miami, Shark, Bones, Grey's Anatomy, Desperate Housewives, and Silicon Valley.

== Personal life ==
Cryer and her husband have three children.

== Filmography ==
=== Film ===
Suzanne Cryer film credits
| Year | Title | Role | Notes |
|---|---|---|---|
| 1994 | Some Folks Call it a Sling Blade | Frances | Short film |
| 1997 | Wag the Dog | Amy Cain | |
| 1998 | Wilbur Falls | Katherine Devereaux | |
| 1998 | My Mother Dreams the Satan's Disciples in New York | Marika | Short film |
| 1999 | Friends & Lovers | Jane McCarthy | |
| 2007 | The Happiest Day of His Life | Cynthia | |
| 2008 | Sex and the City | Dog Rescue Woman | |
| 2016 | 10 Cloverfield Lane | Leslie / Woman | |
| 2018 | The Cloverfield Paradox | Leslie / Newscaster | |
| 2025 | She's the He | Mary | |

=== Television ===
Suzanne Cryer television credits
| Year | Title | Role | Notes |
|---|---|---|---|
| 1992 | Law & Order | Sandy | Episode: "Forgiveness" |
| 1995 | New York News | Lorraine | Episode: "Thin Line" |
| 1996 | Lifestories: Families in Crisis | Ava | Episode: "Someone Had to Be Benny" |
| 1996 | Caroline in the City | Rachel St. Augustine | Episode: "Caroline and the Red Sauce" |
| 1997 | Seinfeld | Marcy | Episode: "The Yada Yada" |
| 1998 | Conrad Bloom | | Episode: "Psycho Babbler, Qu'est-ce que c'est?" |
| 1998–2001 | Two Guys, a Girl and a Pizza Place | Ashley Walker | 60 episodes |
| 1999-2001 | It's Like, You Know... | Kate | 2 episodes |
| 2002 | The Drew Carey Show | Karen | Episode: "Family Affair" |
| 2002–2003 | Frasier | Denise | Episode: "The Guilt Trippers", "Sea Bee Jeebies" |
| 2003 | I'm with Her | Molly | Episode: "The Smarty Party" |
| 2004 | Dr. Vegas | Kate | Episode: "Lust for Life" |
| 2005 | The King of Queens | Marcy Berger | Episode: "Awed Couple" |
| 2005 | ER | Toni Stillman | Episode: "Nobody's Baby" |
| 2005 | Inconceivable | Annie Hillman | Episode: "Between an Egg and a Hard Place" |
| 2005 | Out of Practice | Janice | Episode: "The Wedding" |
| 2006 | The PTA | Martyr | |
| 2006 | Bones | Agent Pickering | Episode: "The Woman in the Car" |
| 2006 | CSI: Miami | Julia Wells | Episode: "Death Eminent" |
| 2006 | Shark | Andrea Crosby | Episode: "Love Triangle" |
| 2007 | Desperate Housewives | Lynn Dean | Episode: "I Remember That" |
| 2007 | Grey's Anatomy | Caroline Klein | Episode: "Time After Time" |
| 2007 | Veronica Mars | Grace Schaffer | Episode: "Debasement Tapes" |
| 2007 | Criminal Minds | Susan Jacobs | Episode: "Seven Seconds" |
| 2008 | Women's Murder Club | Mia Spalding | Episode: "FBI Guy" |
| 2008 | Without a Trace | Kathy Reed | Episode: "A Bend in the Road" |
| 2008 | The Starter Wife | Jolie Driver | 5 episodes |
| 2009 | Nip/Tuck | Carrie-Mae Wells | Episode: "Ricky Wells" |
| 2009 | Southland | Mrs. Davis | Episode: "Unknown Trouble" |
| 2009 | American Dad! | Hooker #1 / Unattractive Girl #2 (voice) | Episode: "Stan's Night Out" |
| 2009 | Dexter | Tarla Grant | Episode: "Remains to Be Seen"; Episode: "Blinded by the Light" |
| 2010 | Medium | Joanna Spencer | Episode: "Smoke Damage" |
| 2011 | CSI: Crime Scene Investigation | Dr. Jennifer Grier | Episode: "Freaks & Geeks" |
| 2011 | The Closer | Emily Shaw | Episode: "Relative Matters" |
| 2013 | Teen Beach Movie | Aunt Antoinette | TV movie |
| 2013–2018 | The Fosters | Jenna Paul | 6 episodes |
| 2014 | Shameless | Cheryl | Episode: "Emily"; Episode: "A Night to Remem...Wait, What?" |
| 2015–2019 | Silicon Valley | Laurie Bream | Main cast |
| 2017 | Lucifer | Grace Foley | Episode: "Welcome Back, Charlotte Richards" |
| 2017 | Superior Donuts | Eliza | Episode: "Art for Art's Sake" |
| 2019–2023 | All Rise | DDA Maggie Palmer | 15 episodes |
| 2020 | Hawaii Five-0 | Suzanne | Episode: "He kohu puahiohio i ka ho'olele i ka lepo i luna" |
| 2022-2026 | Beavis and Butt-Head | Various (voice) | 13 episodes |
| 2023 | Lucky Hank | Gracie DuBois | Main cast |
| 2024 | Percy Jackson and the Olympians | Echidna | Episode: "I Plunge to My Death" |
| 2026 | Ted Lasso | Tammy Dineen (‘Dazzle Me Moi’ Shop Owner) | Episode: "Home (Ted Lasso)" |
