= List of awards and nominations received by Bill Hader =

Bill Hader awards and nominations
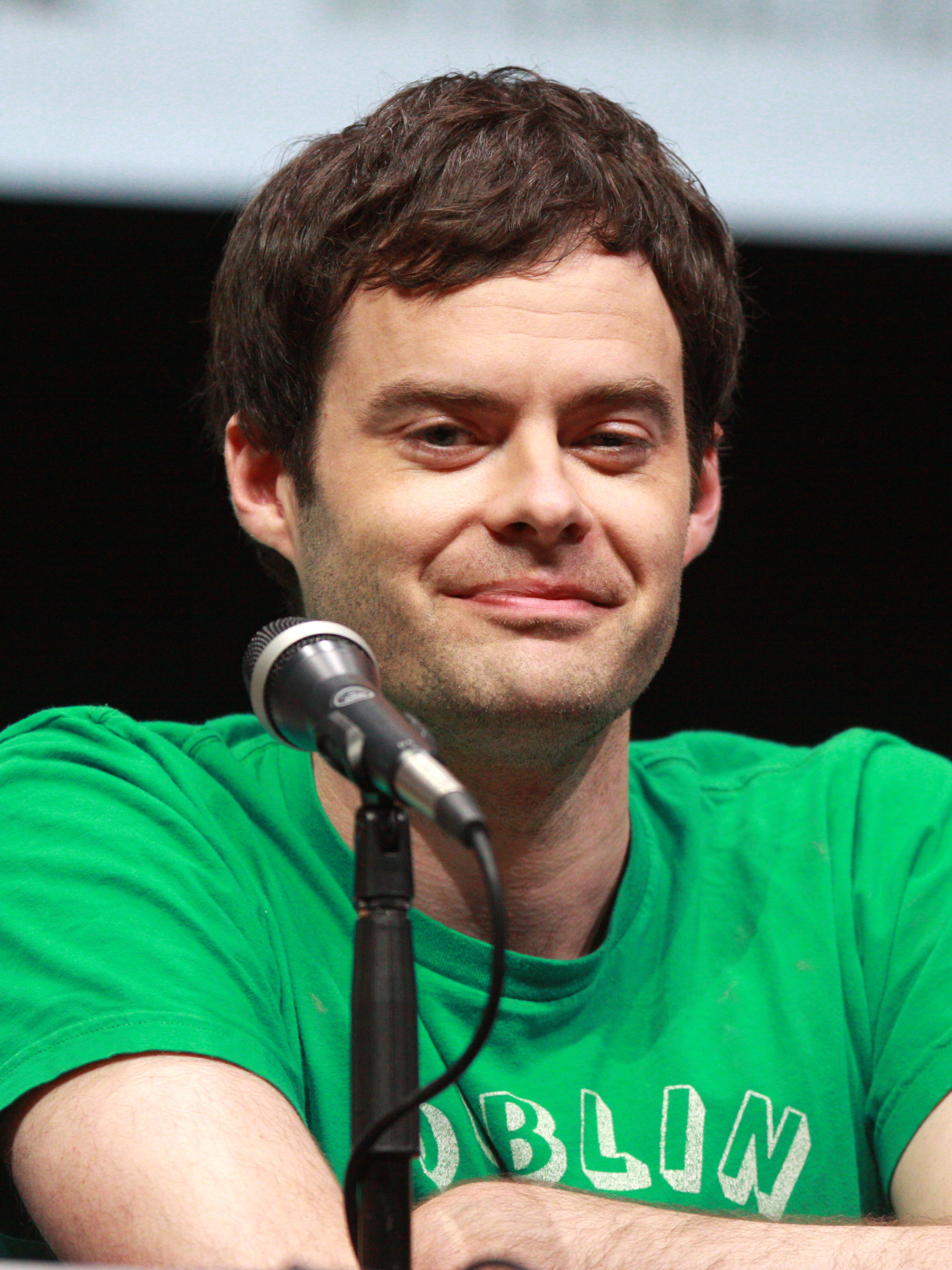
- Hader in 2013
| Award | Wins | Nominations |
| Primetime Emmy Awards | 3 | 29 |
| Golden Globe Awards | 0 | 4 |
| Screen Actors Guild Awards | 0 | 6 |

Bill Hader is an American actor, comedian, writer, producer, and director. He has received three Emmy Awards, two Critics' Choice Awards, and three Directors Guild of America Awards as well as nominations for four Golden Globe Awards and eight Screen Actors Guild Awards.

Hader has received twenty-five Primetime Emmy Award nominations for his work on the NBC sketch series Saturday Night Live, the Comedy Central animated series South Park, the sketch series Documentary Now!, and the HBO dark comedy series Barry, and He won three Emmy Awards, including Outstanding Animated Program for South Park in 2009, and two consecutive wins for Outstanding Lead Actor in a Comedy Series for Barry in 2018 and 2019. He also received four Golden Globe Award nominations and six Screen Actors Guild Award nominations.

As a producer, he received two Producers Guild of America Award nominations and as a director, he received three Directors Guild of America Award wins. As a writer, he received six Writers Guild of America Award nominations and three wins. Hader has also received critical acclaim and Gotham Award nominations for his work as an actor in independent films, such as Adventureland (2009) and The Skeleton Twins (2014).

== Major associations ==
=== Critics' Choice Awards ===
| Year | Category | Nominated work | Result | Ref. |
Critics' Choice Television Award
| 2016 | Best Actor in a Comedy Series | Documentary Now! | Nominated | |
| 2018 | Best Actor in a Comedy Series | Barry (season one) | Won | |
| 2019 | Best Actor in a Comedy Series | Barry (season two) | Won | |
| 2022 | Best Actor in a Comedy Series | Barry (season three) | Nominated | |
| 2023 | Best Actor in a Comedy Series | Barry (season four) | Nominated | |

=== Emmy Award ===
Primetime Emmy Awards
| Year | Category | Nominated work | Result | Ref. |
|---|---|---|---|---|
| 2009 | Outstanding Animated Program | South Park (season 13) | Won | |
| 2011 | Outstanding Animated Program | South Park (season 14) | Nominated | |
| 2012 | Outstanding Supporting Actor in a Comedy Series | Saturday Night Live (episode: "Katy Perry / Robyn") | Nominated | |
| 2013 | Outstanding Supporting Actor in a Comedy Series | Saturday Night Live (episode: "Seth MacFarlane / Frank Ocean") | Nominated | |
| 2014 | Outstanding Animated Program | South Park (season 17) | Nominated | |
| 2015 | Outstanding Animated Program | South Park (season 18) | Nominated | |
| 2015 | Outstanding Guest Actor in a Comedy Series | Saturday Night Live (episode: "Bill Hader / Hozier") | Nominated | |
| 2016 | Outstanding Variety Sketch Series | Documentary Now! (season one) | Nominated | |
| 2017 | Outstanding Variety Sketch Series | Documentary Now! (season two) | Nominated | |
| 2017 | Outstanding Animated Program | South Park (season 20) | Nominated | |
| 2018 | Outstanding Comedy Series | Barry (season one) | Nominated | |
| 2018 | Outstanding Lead Actor in a Comedy Series | Barry (episode: "Chapter Seven: Loud, Fast, and Keep Going") | Won | |
| 2018 | Outstanding Directing for a Comedy Series | Barry (episode: "Make Your Mark") | Nominated | |
| 2018 | Outstanding Writing for a Comedy Series | Barry (episode: "Make Your Mark") | Nominated | |
| 2018 | Outstanding Guest Actor in a Comedy Series | Saturday Night Live (episode: "Bill Hader / Arcade Fire") | Nominated | |
| 2019 | Outstanding Comedy Series | Barry (season two) | Nominated | |
| 2019 | Outstanding Lead Actor in a Comedy Series | Barry (episode: "The Truth Has a Ring to It") | Won | |
| 2019 | Outstanding Directing for a Comedy Series | Barry (episode: "ronny/lily") | Nominated | |
| 2019 | Outstanding Writing for a Comedy Series | Barry (episode: "ronny/lily") | Nominated | |
| 2019 | Outstanding Variety Sketch Series | Documentary Now! (season three) | Nominated | |
| 2022 | Outstanding Comedy Series | Barry (season three) | Nominated | |
| 2022 | Outstanding Lead Actor in a Comedy Series | Barry (episode: "starting now") | Nominated | |
| 2022 | Outstanding Directing for a Comedy Series | Barry (episode: "710N") | Nominated | |
| 2022 | Outstanding Writing for a Comedy Series | Barry (episode: "starting now") | Nominated | |
| 2022 | Outstanding Guest Actor in a Comedy Series | Curb Your Enthusiasm (episode: "Igor, Gregor, & Timor") | Nominated | |
| 2023 | Outstanding Comedy Series | Barry (season four) | Nominated | |
| 2023 | Outstanding Lead Actor in a Comedy Series | Barry (episode: "you're charming") | Nominated | |
| 2023 | Outstanding Directing for a Comedy Series | Barry (episode: "wow") | Nominated | |
| 2023 | Outstanding Writing for a Comedy Series | Barry (episode: "wow") | Nominated | |

=== Golden Globe Award ===
| Year | Category | Nominated work | Result | Ref. |
|---|---|---|---|---|
| 2018 | Best Actor – Television Series Musical or Comedy | Barry (season one) | Nominated | |
| 2019 | Best Actor – Television Series Musical or Comedy | Barry (season two) | Nominated | |
| 2022 | Best Actor – Television Series Musical or Comedy | Barry (season three) | Nominated | |
| 2023 | Best Actor – Television Series Musical or Comedy | Barry (season four) | Nominated | |

=== Peabody Awards ===
| Year | Category | Nominated work | Result | Ref. |
|---|---|---|---|---|
| 2018 | Entertainment | Barry | Won | |
| 2022 | Entertainment | Documentary Now! | Nominated | |

== Guild awards ==
=== Directors Guild of America Award ===
| Year | Category | Nominated work | Result | Ref. |
|---|---|---|---|---|
| 2018 | Directing – Comedy Series | Barry (episode: "Make Your Mark") | Won | |
| 2019 | Directing – Comedy Series | Barry (episode: "ronny/lily") | Won | |
| 2022 | Directing – Comedy Series | Barry (episode: "710N") | Won | |
| 2023 | Directing – Comedy Series | Barry (episode: "wow") | Nominated | |

=== Producers Guild of America Award ===
| Year | Category | Nominated work | Result | Ref. |
|---|---|---|---|---|
| 2018 | Best Episodic Comedy | Barry (season one) | Nominated | |
| 2019 | Best Episodic Comedy | Barry (season two) | Nominated | |
| 2022 | Best Episodic Comedy | Barry (season three) | Nominated | |
| 2023 | Best Episodic Comedy | Barry (season four) | Nominated | |

=== Screen Actors Guild Awards ===
| Year | Category | Nominated work | Result | Ref. |
|---|---|---|---|---|
| 2019 | Outstanding Ensemble in a Comedy Series | Barry (season one) | Nominated | |
| 2019 | Outstanding Actor in a Comedy Series | Barry (season one) | Nominated | |
| 2020 | Outstanding Ensemble in a Comedy Series | Barry (season two) | Nominated | |
| 2020 | Outstanding Actor in a Comedy Series | Barry (season two) | Nominated | |
| 2023 | Outstanding Ensemble in a Comedy Series | Barry (season three) | Nominated | |
| 2023 | Outstanding Actor in a Comedy Series | Barry (season three) | Nominated | |
| 2024 | Outstanding Actor in a Comedy Series | Barry (season four) | Nominated | |
| 2024 | Outstanding Ensemble in a Comedy Series | Barry (season four) | Nominated | |

=== Writers Guild of America Award ===
| Year | Category | Nominated work | Result | Ref. |
|---|---|---|---|---|
| 2016 | Comedy/Variety – Sketch Series | Documentary Now! | Nominated | |
| 2018 | Television: Comedy Series | Barry (season one) | Nominated | |
| 2018 | Television: New Series | Barry (season one) | Won | |
| 2018 | Television: Episodic Comedy | Barry (episode: "Make Your Mark") | Won | |
| 2019 | Television: Comedy Series | Barry (season two) | Won | |
| 2022 | Television: Comedy Series | Barry (season three) | Nominated | |
| 2023 | Television: Comedy Series | Barry (season four) | Nominated | |

== Other awards ==
=== AFI Awards ===
| Year | Category | Nominated work | Result | Ref. |
|---|---|---|---|---|
| 2019 | AFI Television Programs of the Year | Barry | Won | |

=== American Comedy Awards ===
| Year | Category | Nominated work | Result | Ref. |
|---|---|---|---|---|
| 2014 | Funniest Supporting Actor in a Comedy Series | Saturday Night Live | Won | |

=== Dublin Film Critics Circle ===
| Year | Category | Nominated work | Result | Ref. |
|---|---|---|---|---|
| 2014 | Best Actor | The Skeleton Twins | Nominated | |

=== Gotham Awards ===
| Year | Category | Nominated work | Result | Ref. |
|---|---|---|---|---|
| 2009 | Best Ensemble Cast | Adventureland | Nominated | |
| 2014 | Best Actor | The Skeleton Twins | Nominated | |

=== IndieWire Honors ===
| Year | Category | Nominated work | Result | Ref. |
|---|---|---|---|---|
| 2018 | Performance Award | | Won | |

=== Satellite Awards ===
| Year | Category | Nominated work | Result | Ref. |
|---|---|---|---|---|
| 2019 | Best Actor in a Series, Comedy or Musical | Barry (season one) | Nominated | |
| 2020 | Best Actor in a Series, Comedy or Musical | Barry (season two) | Won | |
| 2023 | Best Actor in a Series, Comedy or Musical | Barry (season three) | Won | |
| 2024 | Best Actor in a Series, Comedy or Musical | Barry (season four) | Nominated | |

=== Saturn Awards ===
| Year | Category | Nominated work | Result | Ref. |
|---|---|---|---|---|
| 2021 | Best Supporting Actor | It Chapter Two | Won | |

=== TCA Awards ===
| Year | Category | Nominated work | Result | Ref. |
|---|---|---|---|---|
| 2018 | Individual Achievement in Comedy | Barry (season one) | Nominated | |
| 2019 | Individual Achievement in Comedy | Barry (season two) | Nominated | |
| 2022 | Individual Achievement in Comedy | Barry (season three) | Nominated | |
| 2023 | Individual Achievement in Comedy | Barry (season four) | Nominated | |

=== Women's Film Critics Circle Award ===
| Year | Category | Nominated work | Result | Ref. |
|---|---|---|---|---|
| 2014 | Best On-Screen Couple | The Skeleton Twins | Won | |
