= Berkman ﹥ block =

"berkman > block"
- Barry episode
- Episode no.: Season 2 Episode 8
- Directed by: Bill Hader
- Written by: Alec Berg & Bill Hader
- Cinematography by: Paula Huidobro
- Editing by: Kyle Reiter
- Original air date: May 19, 2019
- Running time: 35 minutes

Guest appearances
- Sarah Burns as Detective Mae Dunn; Paula Newsome as Detective Janice Moss; Darrell Britt-Gibson as Jermaine Jefrint; D'Arcy Carden as Natalie Greer; Andy Carey as Eric; Rightor Doyle as Nick Nicholby; Alejandro Furth as Antonio Manuel; Kirby Howell-Baptiste as Sasha Baxter; Michael Irby as Cristobal Sifuentes; Patricia Fa'asua as Esther; Jessy Hodges as Lindsay Mandel; Chris McGarry as Michael Cohen; Rodney To as Mike; Andrew Leeds as Leo Cousineau; Nikita Bogolyubov as Mayrbek; Troy Caylak as Akhmal; Nick Gracer as Yandal; JB Blanc as Batir; P.J. Marino as Deputy Wilson

Episode chronology
| ← Previous "The Audition" | Next → "forgiving jeff" |

"berkman > block" is the eighth episode and season finale of the second season of the American crime tragicomedy television series Barry. It is the 16th overall episode of the series and was written by series co-creators Alec Berg and Bill Hader, and directed by Hader, who also serves as the main lead actor. It was first broadcast on HBO in the United States on May 19, 2019.

The series follows Barry Berkman, a hitman from Cleveland who travels to Los Angeles to kill someone but finds himself joining an acting class taught by Gene Cousineau, where he meets aspiring actress Sally Reed and begins to question his path in life as he deals with his criminal associates such as Monroe Fuches and NoHo Hank. In the episode, Barry sets out to find Fuches after he implicates Gene in Moss's murder, while he also prepares for his performance with Sally. Meanwhile, Hank prepares to go to war with the Bolivians and Burmese but Fuches ends their feud for his own benefit.

According to Nielsen Media Research, the episode was seen by an estimated 2.21 million household viewers and gained a 0.9 ratings share among adults aged 18–49, making it the most watched episode of the series. The episode received universal acclaim from critics, who praised the performances, writing, character development, surprises, action sequences and ending scene. For his performance in the episode, Stephen Root received an Outstanding Supporting Actor in a Comedy Series nomination at the 71st Primetime Emmy Awards.

== Plot ==
Barry (Bill Hader) hurries to the location of Moss's car, but Fuches (Stephen Root) is unable to shoot Gene (Henry Winkler), so he whispers something in Gene's ear and flees. Barry sees him running and finds a distraught Gene.

Both Barry and Gene are taken into custody. Loach's former partner, Mae Dunn (Sarah Burns), questions Barry and allows him to go. However, she informs him that Gene will remain in custody, as he is the prime suspect for Moss's murder. Barry sends a threatening message to Fuches before leaving the station. Meanwhile, Hank (Anthony Carrigan), Mayrbek (Nikita Bogolyubov), and the Chechens have taken Esther's monastery and prepare to fight the Bolivians and Burmese. However, Hank is once again threatened by his family, who has sent his successor Batir to Los Angeles. He asks Barry for help but he refuses to cooperate with him again. Hank then finds Fuches in the monastery, who wants shelter.

As Barry and the acting class prepare for their performance, Gene is questioned by Dunn but he fails to answer any of her questions and is taken into custody. When Barry finds out, he calls Fuches to promise that he will kill him, while Fuches states that he could just surrender to the police to save Gene. Fuches manages to reconcile all three gangs and Hank with Cristobal (Michael Irby), although Esther (Patricia Fa'asua) remains suspicious.

At the theater, as a distracted Barry prepares to throw a table as rehearsed, Sally does it instead and the performance plays differently, with Sally actually confronting Sam and finishing their relationship, surprising Barry. After the performance, Sally feels bad about lying and Lindsay (Jessy Hodges) consoles her, but Lindsay's colleagues and some audience members praise her performance.

Barry talks with Gene's son, Leo (Andrew Leeds), who tells him that Gene is set to be released. Barry planted Hank's pin on Moss's body, making it appear like the Chechens killed her. He asks Leo to inform Gene that he was right that people can change for the better. Suddenly, Barry then gets a message from Hank revealing that Fuches is at the monastery. Barry drives there and kills Esther when she recognizes him from the failed hit. He then proceeds to kill almost everyone there while Fuches flees. Mayrbek and the Chechens help as he is Barry's mentor. When Barry reaches them, Mayrbek hesitates after realizing the pursuer is his mentor, but is killed alongside his men just as Fuches escapes in a van.

Batir (JB Blanc) arrives at the monastery and finds Hank alive but is delighted to see Esther dead. Barry stares at the carnage he caused. At Gene's house, he suddenly remembers what Fuches whispered to him: "Barry Berkman did this."

== Production ==
=== Development ===
In May 2019, the episode's title was revealed as "berkman > block" and it was announced that series co-creators Alec Berg and Bill Hader had written the episode while Hader had directed it. This was Berg's sixth writing credit, Hader's sixth writing credit, and Hader's fifth directing credit.

=== Writing ===
Bill Hader mentioned that most of the final scenes, from the shooting at the monastery to the final scene, were conceived while he was stuck in traffic while promoting a For Your Consideration event for the first season.

As the writers planned the season, they had the idea of Barry killing people at the monastery but struggled with a motive. Hader did not want Barry to go to the monastery for no reason as he would now be a "mindless killer." Once they decided to put Fuches in the monastery, the writers settled on Barry's motive: "He's there to kill Fuches, everyone else is just in his way."

Barry's reaction after killing Mayrbek was done to achieve a sense of discomfort, with Hader explaining, "Even though we put in those drums and had the rain over it and all that stuff to give it an atmosphere, it's sad. It's a guy disgusted with himself."

Gene discovering Barry's actions was not planned in advance, and only came to fruition when the writers worked on the previous episode. They planned to have Fuches not shoot Gene but felt that just leaving would not work, so they added the revelation. Hader admitted at the time that the writers had not yet planned out the repercussions of the revelation, as they wanted to test their ability to write themselves in a corner. Coincidentally, the scene was shot on Stage 19 at the Paramount Studios lot, where Winkler's series, Happy Days, filmed.

=== Filming ===
The cinematography evoked a meaning for Hader: the first episode of the season had Barry coming out of the darkness and the last scene with Barry involves entering a dark hallway, or "descending back" into darkness. Hader deemed it as "Barry Block is dying and Barry Berkman is taking over."

== Reception ==
=== Viewers ===
The episode was watched by 2.21 million viewers, earning a 0.9 in the 18-49 rating demographics on the Nielson ratings scale. This means that 0.9 percent of all households with televisions watched the episode. This was a 18% increase from the previous episode, which was watched by 1.87 million viewers with a 0.8 in the 18-49 demographics.

=== Critical reviews ===
"berkman > block" received universal acclaim from critics. Vikram Murthi of The A.V. Club gave the episode an "A" and wrote, "A stellar finale written by Alec Berg and Bill Hader, 'berkman > block' caps off a great season of television by masterfully tying off every loose end, even ones that were tossed off or buried, and seamlessly connecting the series' two worlds, thematically and narratively. What's most impressive is that it never once feels tidy or closed off. On the contrary, the airtight writing only amplifies the emotional messiness, illustrating how the characters' actions can't be reduced to psychologically pat explanations. People are driven by many conflicting passions, by both positive and negative behavior, by an overwhelming self-awareness and an irrepressible impulse. Berg and Hader go to great lengths to capture the internal contradictions and their unfortunate outcomes."

Ben Travers of IndieWire gave the episode an "A−" and wrote, "Barry Berkman isn't blocked, he's broken — but 'Barry' is only getting better. In the Season 2 finale of Bill Hader's existential HBO comedy, the eponymous hitman-turned-thespian tries to plug up a release valve that's been opened on stage and won't stop flowing off of it. Over the course of eight episodes, Barry spoke his truth to his acting teacher Gene Cousineau, confessing to the worst thing he's ever done, with the intention of never repeating the same mistake again. But in 'berkman > block', Barry did it again, with 10 times the body count." Darren Franich of Entertainment Weekly gave the episode a "B" and wrote, "The finale decided, in gory detail, that Barry couldn't leave his past behind. In Sally's story, Barry landed on a darker message: You can change — and people will love everything about the new you, except the truth. Season 2 had its problems, but astounding sequences like that suggest new evolutions ahead. Barry can't change, but I hope Barry does."

Jen Chaney of Vulture wrote, "Since Better Call Saul is a Breaking Bad prequel, we know going in that Jimmy McGill will eventually transform into Saul Goodman. But on Barry, right up until this finale, there was still a thread of hope that somehow he could turn things around for himself. After watching Barry blow away multiple dangerous people, then walk down that hallway where the lights briefly flicker, then shut off completely, that seems impossible. Barry Berkman, formerly Barry Block, appears to be lost to the darkness forever. Then again, this is Barry. Next season, it could surprise me." Nick Harley of Den of Geek wrote, "Though not as explosive as the Season 1 finale, 'berkman/block' is a more satisfying on a thematic level and an exquisite finish to a phenomenal sophomore outing. Series creators Hader and Alec Berg have said that they like to write themselves into corners and try to find their way out, and now with Gene knowing Barry's dark secret, they better get to work on navigating this particularly tricky corner. If everything that's come before is any indication, they'll work it out." Alison Foreman of Mashable wrote, "In the show's season finale, it was Barry who had finally had enough, putting his enemies under the gun in a horrifying and spectacular display of 'fuck this' firepower that rivaled even the most grisly of Sopranos shoot-outs."

=== Accolades ===
Stephen Root submitted the episode in consideration for his Outstanding Supporting Actor in a Comedy Series at the 71st Primetime Emmy Awards.
