= The Truth Has a Ring to It =

- Barry episode
- Episode no.: Season 2 Episode 6
- Directed by: Alec Berg
- Written by: Emily Heller
- Cinematography by: Paula Huidobro
- Editing by: Kyle Reiter
- Original air date: May 5, 2019
- Running time: 28 minutes

Guest appearances
- John Pirruccello as Detective John Loach; Sarah Burns as Detective Mae Dunn; Paula Newsome as Detective Janice Moss; Darrell Britt-Gibson as Jermaine Jefrint; D'Arcy Carden as Natalie Greer; Andy Carey as Eric; Rightor Doyle as Nick Nicholby; Alejandro Furth as Antonio Manuel; Kirby Howell-Baptiste as Sasha Baxter; Michael Irby as Cristobal Sifuentes; Patricia Fa'asua as Esther; Jessy Hodges as Lindsay Mandel; Deb Hiett as Diana Loach; Gary Kraus as Chief Krauss; Nikita Bogolyubov as Mayrbek; Troy Caylak as Akhmal; Nick Gracer as Yandal

Episode chronology
← Previous "ronny/lily"	Next → "The Audition"

"The Truth Has a Ring to It" is the sixth episode of the second season of the American crime tragicomedy television series Barry. It is the 14th overall episode of the series and was written by supervising producer Emily Heller, and directed by series co-creator Alec Berg. It was first broadcast on HBO in the United States on May 5, 2019.

The series follows Barry Berkman, a hitman from Cleveland who travels to Los Angeles to kill someone but finds himself joining an acting class taught by Gene Cousineau, where he meets aspiring actress Sally Reed and begins to question his path in life as he deals with his criminal associates such as Monroe Fuches and NoHo Hank. In the episode, Barry cuts ties with Fuches after his betrayal, prompting Fuches to find anything that could incriminate Barry. Meanwhile, Sally decides to rewrite her scene to depict a more truthful version of her story.

The episode, which received critical acclaim, was seen by approximately 1.99 million household viewers and garnered a 0.8 rating among adults aged 18–49.

== Plot ==
The LAPD holds a press conference declaring that Ronny's relationship with Loach's ex-wife led to the fatal fight. At Loach's base of operations, his ex-partner Mae Dunn (Sarah Burns) consoles his ex-wife. After they leave, Barry (Bill Hader) escapes with Loach's incriminating evidence against him to destroy.

Barry tells Fuches (Stephen Root) that he is cutting ties with him, citing his collaboration with Loach. When Barry mentions that Gene (Henry Winkler) knows him better, Fuches calls him out for not telling him about killing Moss. Fuches then states his intentions to collaborate with Hank (Anthony Carrigan), but Barry mocks him, telling him he is nothing without him. Barry goes with Hank to check on his henchmen's training, which has improved drastically. After their training is over, Hank tells Barry that their debt has been settled, handing him a pin as a gift. The most talented of the students, Mayrbeck (Nikita Bogolyubov), thanks Barry for giving him purpose.

At the acting class, Barry is told by Sally (Sarah Goldberg) that after her visit to Sam's hotel room, she rewrote her scene to tell a more truthful version of what happened. When they rehearse it in class, Sally struggles when performing it and leaves ashamed. Barry then asks Gene to help him perform the role of Sam in Sally's scene instead of performing his war scene. Gene instructs him to think of the worst thing he ever did, telling him to use his own story to find the emotion in Sally's scene. Meanwhile, Fuches has gone to Gene's lake house, intending to find any incriminating evidence of Moss' murder, even staying in the woods overnight.

Sally puts even more pressure on her performance after she misses an appointment with her agent, Lindsay (Jessy Hodges). As they perform the scene, Barry uses his trauma over Moss's murder for inspiration, managing to deliver a terrifying performance, which is met with applause. Lindsay is revealed to have witnessed the performance and offers Sally a chance to use this for their own benefit in a performance for multiple industry personnel.

An exhausted Fuches stumbles upon Moss's car. Hank and his men are detained by Esther (Patricia Fa'asua) and Cristobal (Michael Irby) after one of Hank's men snitched on them because Hank had insulted him earlier. Gene dines at a restaurant while Fuches is seated across the room watching him.

== Production ==
=== Development ===
In April 2019, the episode's title was revealed as "The Truth Has a Ring to It" and it was announced that supervising producer Emily Heller had written the episode while series co-creator Alec Berg had directed it. This was Heller's second writing credit, and Berg's third directing credit.

=== Writing ===
Bill Hader explained Barry's decision to cut ties with Fuches, "I think Barry has come around to the idea that Fuches is wrong to him. I don't think Barry ever really views Fuches as dangerous, because Barry's the muscle in the relationship."

Regarding Barry settling his debt to Hank, Hader explained "we always just wanted to make sure that he had to train the Chechens and the Chechens go from terrible to really good under Barry's tutelage, but in doing so he's starting the violent cycle again. He's given the purpose to another nice guy who like Barry happens to be naturally good at it."

=== Filming ===
Two scenes did not make the first cut of the episode. The first involved delving into Barry's past when he talked to Gene, but Alec Berg felt the scene didn't work. Another scene involved Barry and Fuches having their discussion under a bridge instead of next to a bathroom, where they talked more about their history together. As the writers expressed displeasure with the scene and some other aspects, they re-shot many scenes in March 2019. The initial cut of the episode ran 50 minutes long, so the writers had to cut many scenes for time constraints.

== Reception ==
=== Viewers ===
The episode was watched by an estimated 1.986 million viewers and earned a 0.81 rating in the 18-49 demographic of the Nielsen ratings percentage. This means that Neilsen estimated that 0.81 percent of Americans between 18 and 49 watched the episode at the time of airing. Importantly, this estimate does not account for the amount of people watching television at the time and should not be confused with a similar percentage measurement Nielsen uses called share, which would measure the percentage of 18 to 49 year olds watching the episode out of those in the same age range watching any television program. This was a slight decrease from the previous episode, which was watched by 2.033 million viewers and had a 0.85 rating score in the same demographic.

=== Critical reviews ===
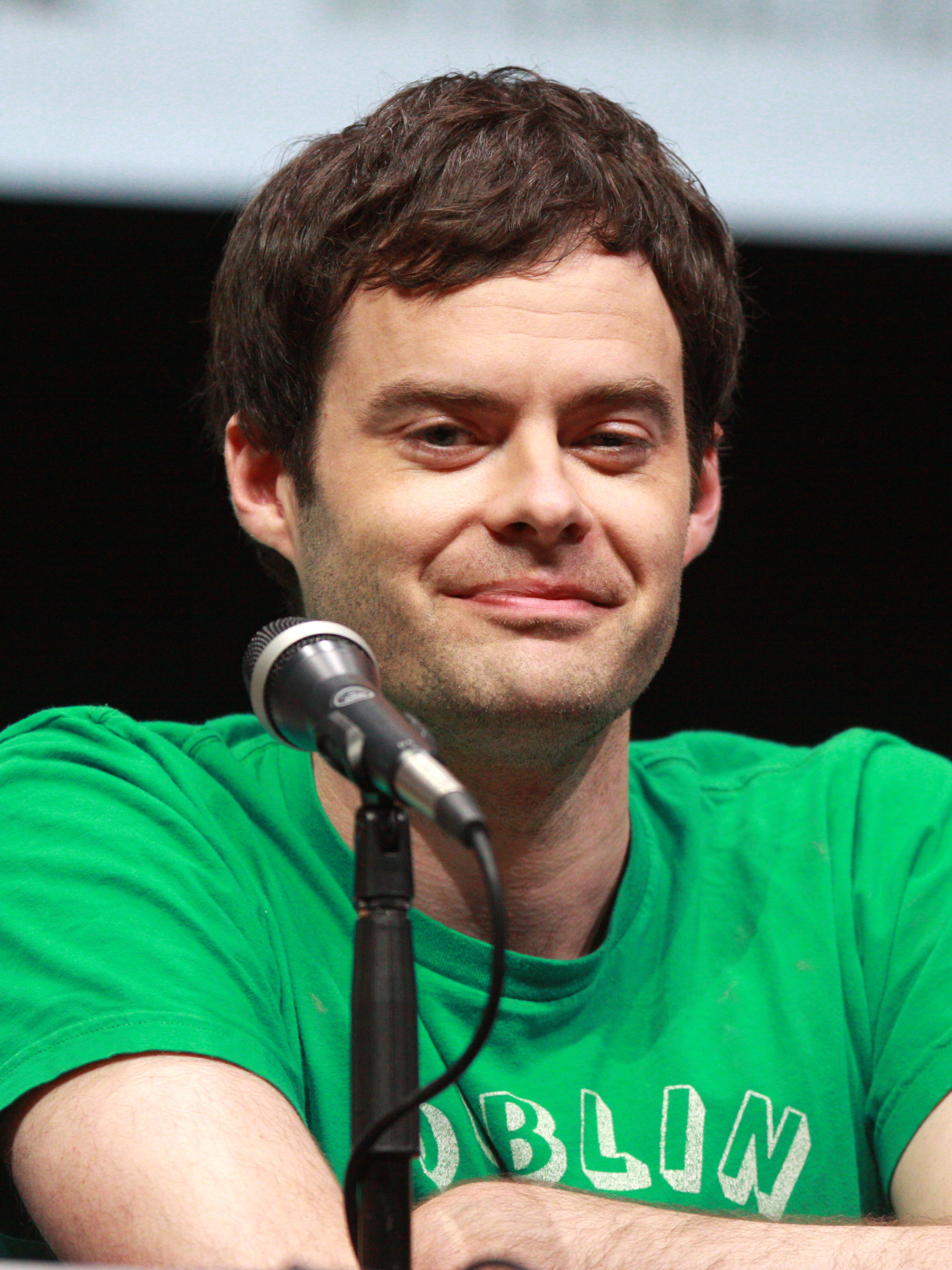
Bill Hader received acclaim for his performance in the episode. He would later win Outstanding Lead Actor in a Comedy Series at the 71st Primetime Emmy Awards.

"The Truth Has a Ring to It" received critical acclaim. Vikram Murthi of The A.V. Club gave the episode an "A−" and wrote, "Barry finally acknowledges Fuches' abuser status: he manipulates Barry into doing his bidding by convincing him that it's for his own good. But now that Barry has wormed his way out of his clutches yet again, Fuches will do anything to get him back. In last week's tour-de-force episode, Barry's blood-loss dreams suggest that Fuches was the devil. Tonight's last shot—Fuches pushed to the far edge of the frame, shot from behind, as he watches Gene eat dinner at the restaurant where Moss and him had their first date—all but confirms it. He's standing on your shoulder, ready to ruin your life."

Nick Harley of Den of Geek gave the episode a 3.5 star rating out of 5 and wrote, "The table has been set for Barry's final two episodes, and if the end of this episode is any indication, big changes could be on horizon for everyone."

=== Accolades ===
Bill Hader submitted the episode in consideration for his Outstanding Lead Actor in a Comedy Series at the 71st Primetime Emmy Awards. Hader would end up winning the award, his second Emmy award for the series.
