= The Audition (Barry) =

- Barry episode
- Episode no.: Season 2 Episode 7
- Directed by: Alec Berg
- Written by: Liz Sarnoff
- Cinematography by: Paula Huidobro
- Editing by: Jeff Buchanan
- Original air date: May 12, 2019
- Running time: 28 minutes

Guest appearances
- Darrell Britt-Gibson as Jermaine Jefrint; D'Arcy Carden as Natalie Greer; Andy Carey as Eric; Rightor Doyle as Nick Nicholby; Alejandro Furth as Antonio Manuel; Kirby Howell-Baptiste as Sasha Baxter; Jay Roach as himself; Michael Irby as Cristobal Sifuentes; Patricia Fa'asua as Esther; Jessy Hodges as Lindsay Mandel; Chris McGarry as Michael Cohen; Rodney To as Mike; David Douglas as Aaron Ryan; Nikita Bogolyubov as Mayrbek; Troy Caylak as Akhmal; Nick Gracer as Yandal; Allison Jones as herself

Episode chronology
← Previous "The Truth Has a Ring to It"	Next → "berkman ﹥ block"

"The Audition" is the seventh episode of the second season of the American crime tragicomedy television series Barry. It is the 15th overall episode of the series and was written by consulting producer Liz Sarnoff, and directed by series co-creator Alec Berg. It was first broadcast on HBO in the United States on May 12, 2019.

The series follows Barry Berkman, a hitman from Cleveland who travels to Los Angeles to kill someone but finds himself joining an acting class taught by Gene Cousineau, where he meets aspiring actress Sally Reed and begins to question his path in life as he deals with his criminal associates such as Monroe Fuches and NoHo Hank. In the episode, Sally passes a chance for a series after she views the content as "revenge porn" and gets jealous when Barry effortlessly gets an audition for a big role in a film. Meanwhile, Hank and the Chechens pay for their betrayal.

According to Nielsen Media Research, the episode was seen by an estimated 1.87 million household viewers and gained a 0.8 ratings share among adults aged 18–49. The episode received positive reviews from critics, with Sarah Goldberg's acting receiving particular praise. For her performance in the episode, Goldberg received an Outstanding Supporting Actress in a Comedy Series nomination at the 71st Primetime Emmy Awards.

== Plot ==
Lindsay (Jessy Hodges) gets Sally (Sarah Goldberg) a meeting for a possible TV series lead role with a powerful producer. In the waiting room, Barry (Bill Hader) is approached by one of Lindsay's associates, resulting in him getting an audition for a comedy feature film entitled Swim Instructors, directed by Jay Roach. Once he tells Sally, she gets upset by the idea that he easily got an audition.

Sally meets with the producer, Aaron Ryan (David Douglas), for the role, but passes after she learns that the TV series just features abused women killing their husbands, deeming it "revenge porn". Her agents get mad at her decision and she storms off. Barry gets help with his audition from Gene (Henry Winkler), who is surprised he got an audition for such a big role. Later, while Barry and Sally rehearse the scene, she expresses her discomfort about showing her true story and reveals her frustration with her journey.

Hank (Anthony Carrigan) and the Chechens are tied to their seats in a bus, which is driven to a desert and covered in gasoline. As Hank starts apologizing for his actions, Mayrbek (Nikita Bogolyubov) frees the Chechens and starts a shootout with their guards while a still-tied Hank loses consciousness. After waking up, Mayrbek executes the Chechen who betrayed the gang, who choose to follow him instead of Hank.

Lindsay arranges for Sally and the acting class's performances to be held at the larger Nate Holden Performing Arts Center. Gene calls Barry to say that he will not read with him at the audition because he is returning to his lake house after being informed of a lead in Moss's murder by a private detective, which is revealed to be Fuches (Stephen Root), shocking Barry. Barry tells him that he will return to his criminal life if he lets Gene live but Fuches hangs up. During his audition, Barry is unable to properly perform his scene and leaves, although Roach is intrigued by his take on the character.

At the lake house, Fuches is upset at Gene's comment on how he saved Barry by guiding him towards acting and takes him to Moss's car. Fuches takes Gene's phone to call the police, and does an impression of Gene's voice to report Moss's body and that he killed her and is now suicidal. Fuches opens the trunk, revealing Moss's body, leaving Gene shaken. As Barry hurries through the woods to get to the car, Fuches aims his gun at Gene's head.

== Production ==
=== Development ===
In April 2019, the episode's title was revealed as "The Audition" and it was announced that consulting producer Liz Sarnoff had written the episode while series co-creator Alec Berg had directed it. This was Sarnoff's second writing credit, and Berg's fourth directing credit.

=== Writing ===
Liz Sarnoff's initial draft of the script had very little involvement of Barry, who was described as "just kind of follows Sally around." Bill Hader and Alec Berg reviewed options, noting that Barry cut ties with important figures (Fuches and the Chechens) in the previous episode, so he would now be in a "good place". So they wrote the segment of Barry getting a role in a film but only because of his looks. Hader deemed the episode "the most sitcom-y episode we've ever done."

In the episode, Sarah Goldberg performs a three-minute monologue, filmed in a long take. The writers wanted a scene that could properly tell Sally's feelings to Barry and decided to make use of Goldberg's theater background to film the scene in a long take. Goldberg performed the monologue in four takes, all of which received applause from the crew. Goldberg viewed the scene as a "real gift" and was delighted to see that the scene was included in its entirety without any cuts in the final broadcast version.

=== Casting ===
Director Jay Roach and casting director Allison Jones make cameo appearances as themselves, in the scene where Barry attends an audition for a film. Roach was directing Bombshell around the time the episode was filming but was interested in appearing in the series, taking a day off to film his scene.

== Reception ==
=== Viewers ===
The episode was watched by 1.87 million viewers, earning a 0.8 in the 18-49 rating demographics on the Nielson ratings scale. This means that 0.8 percent of all households with televisions watched the episode. This was a slight decrease from the previous episode, which was watched by 1.99 million viewers with a 0.8 in the 18-49 demographics.

=== Critical reviews ===
"The Audition" received positive reviews from critics. Vikram Murthi of The A.V. Club gave the episode a "B+" and wrote, "Barry has maintained a consistently dark tone this season, even at its funniest, so it's a nice bit of modulation to see it indulge in some relatively lighter fare. But from the moment when Gene calls Barry to inform him that private detective 'Kenneth Goulet' wants to take a look at the cabin, Sarnoff and director Alec Berg throw you right back into the series' deep end."

Nick Harley of Den of Geek wrote, "'The Audition' is a packed episode, but as stated earlier, it's really a culmination of Sally's arc this season. She gets something of a happy ending when her agent reveals that she's dedicated to getting Sally meaningful work, which is probably more than most struggling actress get. Next week is the finale, and where we leave Barry, Gene, Hank, and Fuches seems to indicate that we may be losing one of our central characters. Unlike the show that directly proceeds this program, excited to see how the season ends."

=== Accolades ===
TVLine named Sarah Goldberg as an honorable mention as the "Performer of the Week" for the week of May 18, 2019, for her performance in the episode. The site wrote, "Barry's eternally aspiring actress Sally was under a lot of pressure this week, and Sarah Goldberg let it all come spilling out in a messy, frantic monologue that had us ready to cast her on the spot. Confessing her fears about her upcoming showcase and standing 'naked' on stage to tell her story and also her intense jealousy at Barry landing a dream audition while she toils in obscurity, Sally scarcely took a breath as she unpacked every bit of her emotional baggage. Her whole monologue might've actually been one long run-on sentence, now that we think about it — but Goldberg was both touchingly vulnerable and utterly hilarious through every rambling second of it."

Goldberg submitted the episode in consideration for her Outstanding Supporting Actress in a Comedy Series at the 71st Primetime Emmy Awards.
