= Optimal Tip-to-Tip Efficiency =

- Silicon Valley episode
- Episode no.: Season 1 Episode 8
- Directed by: Mike Judge
- Written by: Alec Berg
- Original air date: June 1, 2014
- Running time: 29 minutes

Guest appearances
- Asif Ali as Kwerpy employee; Jessica Chaffin as Zenella presenter; David Fabrizo as police officer; Chase Kim as VC Guy; Jason Kincaid as himself; Ben Zelevansky as Stage Manager; Michael Arrington as himself; Andy Buckley as Carl Flemming; Andrew Burlinson as Nathan Gallagher; Aly Mawaji as Aly Dutta; Kara Swisher as herself; Brian Tichnell as Jason; Matt Ross as Gavin Belson

Episode chronology
← Previous "Proof of Concept"	Next → "Sand Hill Shuffle"

"Optimal Tip-to-Tip Efficiency" is the eighth and final episode of the first season of the American television comedy series Silicon Valley. The episode was written by Alec Berg and directed by series co-creator Mike Judge, and originally aired on HBO on June 1, 2014. Berg received a nomination for Outstanding Writing for a Comedy Series at the 66th Primetime Emmy Awards for writing the episode.

== Plot ==
In the aftermath of the previous episode, TechCrunch informs the Pied Piper team that Dan Melcher has been banned from judging at Disrupt, fired from his job at Oracle, and that his wife has left him. Desperate to avoid litigation as a result of Melcher's assault of Erlich (T.J. Miller), the head of Disrupt offers Pied Piper a ticket straight to the final round, where they will compete for the grand prize. However, the team soon witnesses Gavin Belson's (Matt Ross) presentation of Nucleus, which reveals additional optimal features as well as a Weissman score of 2.89, the same as Pied Piper's. The presentation leaves Richard (Thomas Middleditch) and the rest of the Pied Piper team despondent. Dinesh (Kumail Nanjiani) and Gilfoyle (Martin Starr) contemplate leaving Pied Piper while Jared (Zach Woods) attempts to pitch the company to people outside of the conference, only to be arrested by the police in an incident involving Adderall. Monica (Amanda Crew) tells Richard that she has been called back to Palo Alto as a result of Belson's presentation, and offers to have a drink with him afterward.

At night, retrieved to their hotel rooms, the Pied Piper team remains pessimistic about the presentation, but Erlich proclaims that he would go as far as giving every man in the conference room handjobs just for the team to win. This results in the team mocking up a mathematical model for Erlich's claim, and Richard has an epiphany about Pied Piper. He spends the night revamping Pied Piper's platform and keeps only the compression engine. In the morning, he reveals the changes to the group and asks to present; Monica heads back to San Francisco to watch the team.

As Richard presents, he reveals that because Pied Piper cannot match Nucleus in terms of features, he has revamped the platform and achieved a Weissman score of 3.8. The crowd gasps in response and one of the Disrupt judges hands Richard a file to compress: a 132 GB 3D video file, which Pied Piper originally had difficulty compressing. Richard runs the file, and it compresses into one-fifth of its initial file size. Richard initially thought the file was wrongfully compressed, but a Weissman test reveals a record-breaking 5.2 Weissman score, doubling the best score on record. The crowd cheers and Belson walks out in humiliation while Pied Piper is awarded the Disrupt Cup and $50,000 in prize money.

Afterward, the Pied Piper team is greeted by reporters and interested potential investors. Monica congratulates Richard and tells him that because of increasing business interests, things will only get harder. Overwhelmed, Richard rushes out of the back door and throws up into a dumpster.

== Reception ==
Les Chappell of The A.V. Club give the episode an A− rating, saying the episode "finds a way to be simultaneously crude and technical in a way that encapsulates the full energy of the show". Clifford Wheatley, in a review for IGN, calls the episode "a phenomenal and hilarious finale to a very strong first seasons of Silicon Valley, leaving the characters in a more interesting place than it found them with lots of potential ahead".

Alec Berg was nominated for an Outstanding Writing for a Comedy Series at the 66th Primetime Emmy Awards for writing the episode.
