= Two Days of the Condor =

- Silicon Valley episode
- Episode no.: Season 2 Episode 10
- Directed by: Alec Berg
- Written by: Alec Berg
- Cinematography by: Tim Suhrstedt
- Editing by: Joshua Alan Baca
- Original air date: June 14, 2015
- Running time: 28 minutes

Guest appearances
- Frank Collison as Noah; Chris Diamantopoulos as Russ Hanneman; Matt McCoy as Pete Monahan; Alyson Reed as Louise; Bernard White as Denpok

Episode chronology
← Previous "Binding Arbitration"	Next → "Founder Friendly"
- Silicon Valley (season 2)

"Two Days of the Condor" is an episode of the comedy television series Silicon Valley. It constitutes the tenth and final of the second season, and the 18th overall episode of the series. The episode was written and directed by Alec Berg.

In the episode, while Pied Piper's livestream of a technician from the National History Museum falling down a ravine gains traction, Richard continues to fight a lawsuit from Hooli alleging that the Pied Piper IP is theirs. The livestream goes viral soon becomes a meme in the Philippines, causing Pied Piper's servers to catch fire. Meanwhile, the judge rules that Hooli legally owns the Pied Piper IP. Facing no other option, Richard tells Dinesh to delete Pied Piper. Richard learns that, due to specific language in his contract, Richard wasn't legally employed by Hooli, meaning Richard actually owns Pied Piper and its IP. Per Richard's request, Dinesh creates a script to delete Pied Piper; due to a bug in the script, the script crashes, saving Pied Piper.

"Two Days of the Condor" originally aired on HBO on June 14, 2015. The episode received generally positive reviews, with The A.V. Club giving the episode an A−. According to Nielsen Media Research, "Two Days of the Condor" was seen by 2.1 million viewers, second only to the season five finale of Game of Thrones, "Mother's Mercy." For his teleplay, Berg received a nomination for Outstanding Writing for a Comedy Series.

== Plot ==
A Pied Piper livestream of a National History Museum technician falling down a ravine reaches 7,000 viewers as Richard Hendricks (Thomas Middleditch) awaits the decision of an arbitration case against him by Hooli, who alleged that the Pied Piper IP is theirs, due to the fact that Richard worked on Pied Piper while working for Hooli. A Hooli lawyer visits the Hacker Hostel to intimidate Richard, telling him to prepare the platform for Hooli's acquisition. Pessimistic, Bertram Gilfoyle (Martin Starr) discusses deleting Pied Piper's code to Richard, citing the Intersite ineptitude. Richard objects, wanting to see how big Pied Piper can get until its eventual demise. Erlich Bachman (T.J. Miller) puts the hostel up for sale, uncertain of Pied Piper's future. The livestream gains traction as links to it are shared on BuzzFeed and Reddit. Jared Dunn (Zach Woods) announces to the team that Manny Pacquiao, a local celebrity in the Philippines, had shared a link to the livestream to his two million followers.

As the livestream becomes an internet sensation in the Philippines, the increased traffic puts strain on Pied Piper's servers, as Gilfoyle works to keep the breakers in the Hacker Hostel from tripping, and attracts the attention of Laurie Bream (Suzanne Cryer) and Monica (Amanda Crew), who comment on the livestream's popularity in the Philippines. As the Pied Piper team works towards keeping the servers online, Erlich declines an all-cash offer to buy the hostel, and helps Dinesh Chugtai (Kumail Nanjiani) keep the servers online. As the livestream crosses 300,000 viewers, the servers catch on fire. The livestream ends with the technician drinking his own urine on the livestream as a rescue team arrives.

Meanwhile, as Gavin Belson (Matt Ross) and Richard await the judge's decision, Gavin reveals to Richard that the Pied Piper algorithm was the only way to make Nucleus work and that he would have paid $250 million for Pied Piper had the arbitration case not happened. The arbitration judge rules that Hooli has a right to ownership of Pied Piper's IP. Hopeless, Richard texts Jared to tell him to delete Pied Piper's code. The judge adds a caveat to his ruling, however: a clause in Hooli's employment agreement forbade Richard from hiring Jared, which a ruling by the Supreme Court of California deemed unlawful, making Richard's employment under Hooli invalid and thereby Hooli has no legal right to Pied Piper's IP.

Realizing that he had told Dinesh to delete Pied Piper's code, Richard frantically attempts to call Jared to get him to call off deleting Pied Piper, but his phone dies before he can call him. Richard then attempts to get to his car, but his car keys fall into a sewer drain. Panicking, Richard goes to a coffee shop and borrows a phone before realizing that he doesn't know any of the team's phone numbers. Richard then boards a bus and borrows the bus driver's phone to send an email to Jared. Unbeknownst to Richard, his email never got through to Jared, as the Pied Piper team celebrated Pied Piper before eventually running Dinesh's script to delete Pied Piper. Fortunately for Richard, a bug in the script causes it to crash, preserving the algorithm.

At Hooli, Gavin faces the Hooli board. Meanwhile, Laurie approaches Russ Hanneman (Chris Diamantopoulos) and purchases his stake in Pied Piper, securing three out of five board seats in Pied Piper. As the Pied Piper team celebrate their victory over Hooli, Monica calls Richard to inform him that Raviga had acquired a majority share in Pied Piper and Richard has to step down as CEO of Pied Piper, effective immediately.

== Production ==
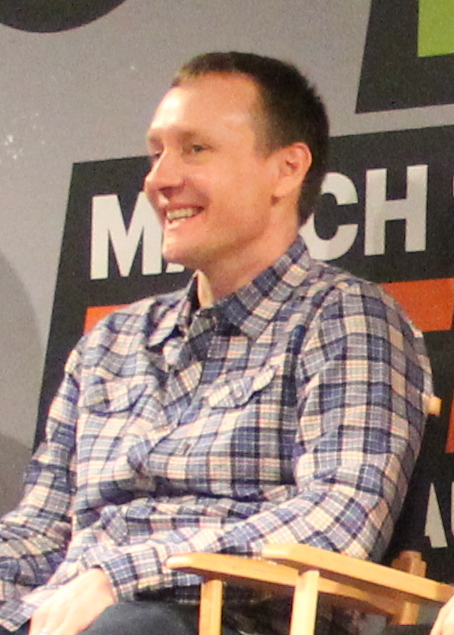
Silicon Valley executive producer Alec Berg wrote and directed "Two Days of the Condor"

"Two Days of the Condor" was directed and written by Alec Berg, an executive producer for Silicon Valley. The episode was seen as a critique of predatory lawsuits seen throughout Silicon Valley, and the contrast between Hooli and Pied Piper was noted.

Chris Diamantopoulos makes a guest appearance in the episode as Russ Hanneman, who is portrayed as a sleazy billionaire obsessed with the "three commas club", a reference to the three decimal separators separating the number 1,000,000,000 in his net worth.

== Reception ==
=== Ratings ===
In its original broadcast on June 15, 2015, on HBO, "Two Days of the Condor" was viewed by 2.11 million viewers, about a 13 percent increase from the previous episode, "Binding Arbitration". "Two Days of the Condor" received a 1.1 rating share among viewers between 18-49. It was outperformed by the Game of Thrones season five finale Mother's Mercy, which was seen by 8.11 million households, although the episode outperformed Family Guy on Adult Swim.

=== Critical reception ===
"Two Days of the Condor" was a surprisingly riveting, heartbreaking, and hilarious piece of television that sends Silicon Valley's second season out with a bang.

— Cliff Wheatley, IGN

"Two Days of the Condor" received generally positive reviews. Cliff Wheatley of IGN described the episode "riveting, heartbreaking, and hilarious piece of television that sends Silicon Valley's second season out with a bang" and gave the episode a 9.5 out of 10. Writing for Vulture.com, Odie Henderson called the episode's script "excellent" with "a streak of pettiness running through it". Additionally, Henderson drew parallels to the season two episode "White Hat/Black Hat" in regards to the race against time elements seen in both episodes. In a review for The A.V. Club, Les Chappell praised the episode for its high-stakes, although had reservations regarding the relationship between Laurie and Russ, writing, "One major regret of the episode is that we were denied a scene between Laurie and Russ, after 'Bad Money' all but assured us one was coming when Laurie refused to ever be in the same room as him." In addition, Chappell noted Erlich's development in the episode, referring to him doing technical work for Pied Piper.

The connection between business culture in Silicon Valley and the episode were noted by Washington Post writer Alyssa Rosenberg, who wrote, "'Silicon Valley' gives lie to the idea that the tech industry is a pure meritocracy, or even that it functions with anything close to perfect efficiency", going on to reference a scene in the episode where Gavin informs Richard that Pied Piper's algorithm is the only way to make Nucleus work as an example of true meritocracy. The episode's ending, with Raviga's hostile takeover of Pied Piper and Richard being forcefully exited from Pied Piper, was also noted.

=== Awards ===
Alec Berg was nominated for a Primetime Emmy Awards for Outstanding Writing for a Comedy Series for writing "Two Days of the Condor", accounting for one of the three Primetime Emmy Award nominations Silicon Valley received that season, alongside the season two episode "Sand Hill Shuffle" and the series as a whole.
