= Ronny/lily =

"ronny/lily"
- Barry episode
- Episode no.: Season 2 Episode 5
- Directed by: Bill Hader
- Written by: Alec Berg & Bill Hader
- Cinematography by: Paula Huidobro
- Editing by: Jeff Buchanan
- Original air date: April 28, 2019
- Running time: 32 minutes

Guest appearances
- John Pirruccello as Detective John Loach; Daniel Bernhardt as Ronny Proxin; Jessie Giacomazzi as Lily Proxin

Episode chronology
← Previous "What?!"	Next → "The Truth Has a Ring to It"

"ronny/lily" is the fifth episode of the second season of the American crime tragicomedy television series Barry. It is the 13th overall episode of the series and was written by series creators Alec Berg and Bill Hader, and directed by Hader, who also acts as the series' lead actor. It was first broadcast on HBO in the United States on April 28, 2019.

The series follows Barry Berkman, a hitman from Cleveland who travels to Los Angeles to kill someone but finds himself joining an acting class taught by Gene Cousineau, where he meets aspiring actress Sally Reed and begins to question his path in life as he deals with his criminal associates such as Monroe Fuches and NoHo Hank. In the episode, Barry and Fuches go to perform a hit for Loach, who promises to ignore incriminating evidence against them if they kill his ex-wife's lover: a deadly martial artist with a seemingly superhuman daughter. The episode is notable for its distinctly surreal tone and narrative compared to the rest of the series. Bill Hader and Stephen Root are the only main cast members to appear in the episode, the fewest of the series.

According to Nielsen Media Research, the episode was seen by an estimated 2.03 million household viewers and gained a 0.9 ratings share among adults aged 18–49. The episode received universal acclaim from critics, who praised Hader's directing, performances (particularly Hader and Root), writing, action sequences, cinematography, sound design, originality and ambition, with many deeming it one of the series' best episodes. The episode received nominations for Outstanding Writing for a Comedy Series and Outstanding Directing for a Comedy Series at the 71st Primetime Emmy Awards.

== Plot ==
Loach's ex-wife's lover, Ronny Proxin (Daniel Bernhardt), enters his house and encounters Barry (Bill Hader), who tells him that Loach sent him to kill him. Barry offers Ronny a chance to escape to Chicago to hide with family, lets him begin to pack his belongings, and notices that he keeps many Taekwondo awards. Ronny, under the influence of marijuana, surprises Barry with a kick, but his windpipe is broken in the subsequent fight, and he collapses after attacking Barry with nunchucks. Ronny's 12-year-old daughter, Lily (Jessie Giacomazzi), arrives home from her martial arts class, worrying what has happened to her father. Barry tries to calm her, but she starts making animal-like noises and viciously attacks him with seemingly superhuman strength, agility, and speed, throwing multiple household objects and stabbing him in the back before running away in tears.

A wounded Barry leaves the house to meet with Fuches (Stephen Root), confident that Ronny is dead. As a result of the blood loss, Barry flashes back to coming home from Afghanistan with other soldiers meeting their relatives, where he sees only Fuches waiting for him. When Barry tells Fuches Lily stabbed him, Fuches says they need to kill her as she could identify Barry.

Driving through the neighborhood, they find Lily sitting on the sidewalk edge. Barry refuses to kill her, so Fuches decides to do it himself. As he approaches her, she climbs a tree and sits perched for hours atop a roof, with Fuches deeming her as non-human. As night falls, Barry rips his wound, and Fuches tends to it with superglue. Lily jumps onto the car, causing a panicked Fuches to glue his hands to the steering wheel. Lily sneaks into the car and bites off a chunk of Fuches's cheek before running away.

Fuches drives to the drug store and tells Barry to find something to get the superglue off his hands. Inside, Barry encounters a badly injured Ronny, who attacks Barry and one of the store's employees. Loach (John Pirruccello) arrives and shoots Ronny, then claims Barry has a gun and starts shooting at him. Ronny stands up and kicks Loach in the head, killing him instantly. Police officers arrive and shoot Ronny dead as Barry escapes through a back door. He finds Fuches's car outside, and as he approaches it, he sees Fuches as the same person from his dreams before flashing back to reality, where Fuches pressures Barry to get in the car.

== Production ==
=== Development ===
In April 2019, the episode's title was revealed as "ronny/lily" and it was announced that series creators Alec Berg and Bill Hader had written the episode, while Hader had directed it. This was Berg's fifth writing credit, Hader's fifth writing credit, and Hader's fourth directing credit.

Hader previously directed three episodes in the first season. However, he expressed his desire to expand his vision for the series, saying "I didn't stick to my guns" when he directed the episodes. He wrote the episode with the intention of directing it, "I saw it very clearly, and I wrote it super specifically. It was very strange because usually, when we write episodes, it's Alec Berg, me and the writers in a room. But this is one where I came in and pitched it to all of them, and they were like, 'That sounds crazy!' It was a weird thing I was cooking up privately that I told them about, and they were into it." To prepare for the episode, Hader watched films by Andrzej Wajda, whom he deemed a major influence on the episode and the season, taking inspiration from A Generation (1955), Kanał (1957) and Ashes and Diamonds (1958).

=== Writing ===
The concept for the episode came from the series' stunt coordinator, Wade Allen. Allen informed Hader that he knew a child stunt performer named Jessie Giacomazzi, an expert in karate, in case he ever needed one. During summer 2018, while he was filming Noelle, Hader came up with the concept of Barry entering a house and facing off the girl. He said, "I don't know where they go, but the idea of Fuches and Barry trying to get a kid into car, like she's like a lost dog and they can't get her in the car and then she climbs up a tree..." The writers took inspiration from the Moonlighting episode "Atomic Shakespeare", which would allow them to play with the episode's pace. For the episode's surreal tone, the writers used "Pine Barrens" from The Sopranos and "Teddy Perkins" from Atlanta as examples.

The episode deviated from the more "grounded" episodes of the series, by depicting a more "otherworldly" episode. Hader said, "I can't describe it. It just morphs into that as you start writing it and you get into it with Wade and the stunt performer and you're watching rehearsals. Her not being fully human was kind of happening very slowly; it was very intuitive. It was like, 'How far can we push this before it gets too crazy?' And it was one of those things where the episode and what she was doing could hold that. A little goes a long way." He also decided to omit an explanation behind Lily's attitude in the episode, "it's more interesting not to know. You want to see it from Barry and Fuches' point of view." He also said, "We might have jumped the shark. If we did, well, who cares? It was rad."

The original idea involved starting the episode with Barry hiding in the house before Ronny showed up. Staff writer Taofik Kolade suggested starting from Ronny's perspective, as it would let the viewers debate whether Barry was in the house or not. Hader wrote the first 15 pages in one sitting, which culminated with Ronny's "death". While co-creator Alec Berg liked the concept, he was curious about what would happen next. Berg contributed with the next section of the script, where he was specifically interested in bringing up the events at the monastery.

When questioned about the meaning of the desert for the scenes where Barry was dreaming, Hader explained "the desert is the place where Barry does all his bad — where he's in his element, this place where nothing can grow and things just die. And he's always trying to get to water."

Regarding the final scene where Barry stares at Fuches, Hader explained "he's starting to realize that this might not be good for him because people are just using him, and he's like all messed up. He's hurt and he's like, 'Alright, up you go. Go get her.' He doesn't care about Barry's well-being and I think Barry's figuring that out."

=== Filming ===
Wade Allen served as the stunt coordinator for the episode. Hader wanted the house fight scene to feel exhausting for the characters, "I wanted it to feel more real in a sense and just brutal." The fight scene at Ronny's house was originally going to consist of a long take for the whole scene. However, cinematographer Paula Huidobro suggested a different approach, "What if they wiped out of frame and then we just slowly land on them?" Hader liked the idea, which was used in the final cut of the episode. Allen viewed the choreography as a challenge, "every punch, every knee, every kick needs to sell for the camera."

Hader viewed the scene where Barry hits Ronny's windpipe as very difficult to film: "they both fall out of frame. Camera operators, the way they're taught, they pan with the action. I just wanted it to be empty because I wanted Ronny's wheezing to take us to him. I couldn't describe that. The real hero of this episode is my first A.D., Gavin Kleintop. He would help when I was having a hard time explaining something: 'What you want is an empty frame.'"

Ronny's house was built on a sound stage, which allowed the crew to remove the ceiling to hang wires for child actress and martial artist Jessie Giacomazzi. Hader wanted the fight with Lily to feel different from the fight with Ronny, as he felt it would be too repetitive.

Multiple sections of the episode consisted of visual effects work. The scene where Lily climbs a tree was actually achieved through visual effects, with Giacomazzi using a green screen climbing wall. This was done as Hader found a perfect location for the house with a "perfect roof" but there was no tree. Hader often expressed anxiety every time the actress would climb the wall, as he feared she could get hurt. The sound design for the fight scenes consisted almost entirely of automated dialogue replacement (ADR), with Bernhardt and Giacomazzi being brought back to dub certain portions of the episode.

=== Music ===
For scenes in the drug store, "How Do I Live" by LeAnn Rimes was used. Originally, the scene would include an unidentified song from Celine Dion but the crew was unable to secure the rights to the song.

== Reception ==
=== Viewers ===
The episode was watched by 2.03 million viewers, earning a 0.9 in the 18-49 rating demographics on the Nielson ratings scale. This means that 0.9 percent of all households with televisions watched the episode. This was a 4% increase from the previous episode, which was watched by 1.94 million viewers with a 0.7 in the 18-49 demographics.

=== Critical reviews ===
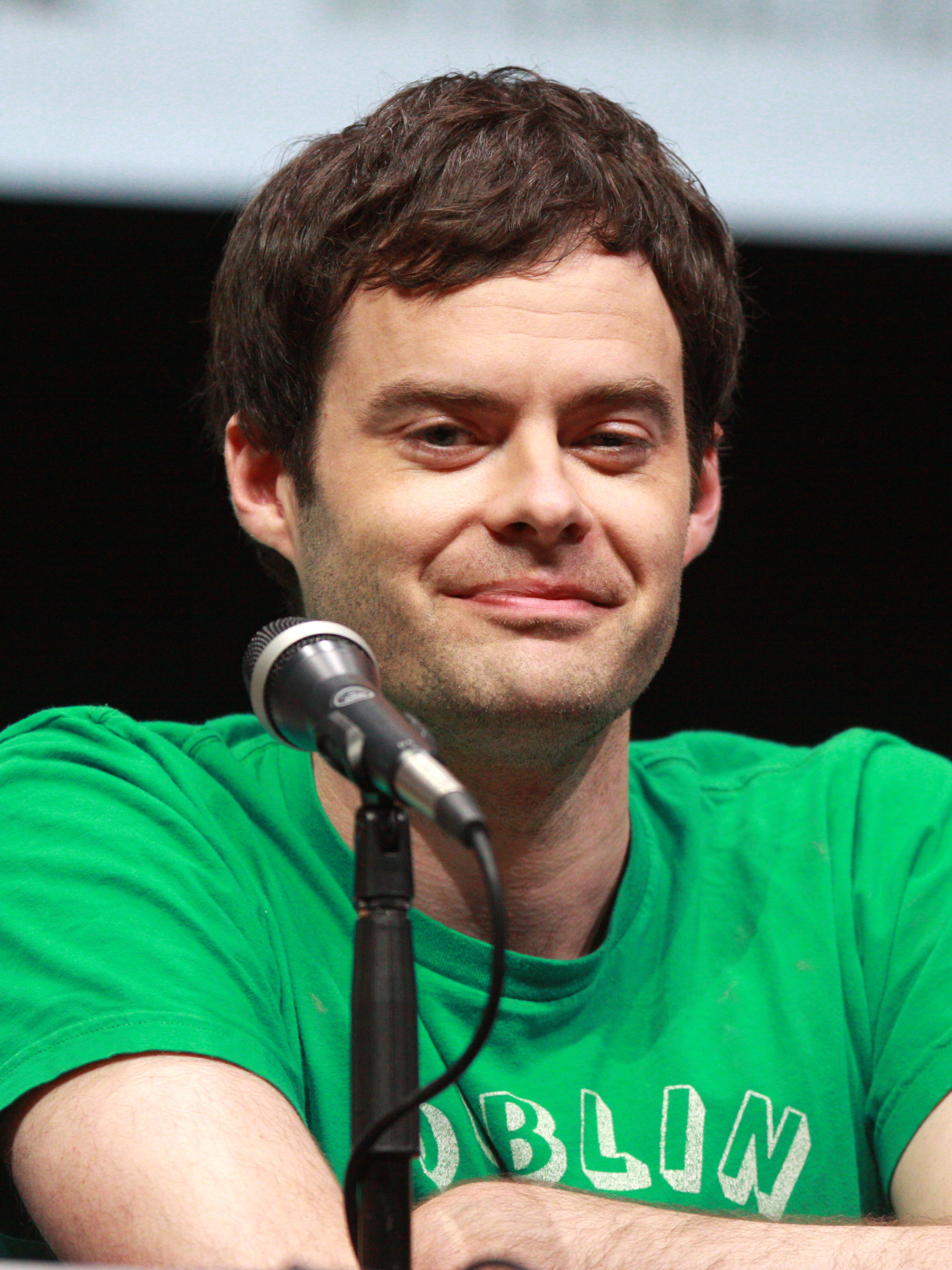
Bill Hader, who starred, co-wrote and directed the episode, received critical acclaim for the episode.

"ronny/lily" received universal acclaim from critics. Vikram Murthi of The A.V. Club gave the episode an "A" and wrote, "Though he directed the series' first three episodes, 'ronny/lily' still feels like an unprecedented technical accomplishment. Everything from the camera setups to the simple, yet unshowy formal techniques to the complex staging feels like the work of a guy who finally gets to employ every bit of knowledge he picked up from a life spent on film sets. As a result, he has broken Barry wide open, and left endless possibilities in its wake."

Emily VanDerWerff of Vox wrote, "in 'ronny/lily', an episode of Barry unlike any other, and unlike that of any other show on TV, the series digs ever deeper into what has turned the character into such a raw nerve. If season one was about how Barry feels about being Barry, then season two is about how we in the audience feel about that." Emily Kubincanek of Film School Rejects wrote, "This episode of Barry pushes the boundaries of what we expect from television with cinematic camerawork, dream sequences, and weird comedy. It proves that Bill Hader is remarkably talented, not just as an actor but as an artist in general. If there is such a thing as a television auteur, Bill Hader qualifies for that title easily. 'ronny/lily' feels like it will be the best episode of the season already, but anyone who watches Barry knows that it just keeps getting better, and the main reason for that is Bill Hader."

Nick Harley of Den of Geek gave the episode a perfect 5 star rating out of 5 and wrote, "'ronny/lily' is just an absolute barn-burner, the kind of episode that you watch the majority of on the edge of your seat with your mouth wide open. Barry Season 2 has been a steady improvement on an already stellar first season, and here the season's first prestige TV canon-worthy installment. Forget about the Battle of Winterfell, I want to re-watch the supermarket scuffle." Dom Nero of Esquire wrote, "'ronny/lily' is the first episode of the series to take an unwavering approach, playing out fully in real-time. What results is a 38 minute descent into that essential dichotomy, feeling somewhere between the shocking one-take episode True Detective's first season ("Who Goes There"), and Dumb and Dumber, where every moment is both petrifying, idiotic, unexpected, and unfathomable. There is lots of TV to watch right now. But with 'ronny/lily', Bill Hader has got a winner on his hands."

The episode was named one of the best TV episodes of 2019 by Paste, Entertainment Weekly, The New York Times, Den of Geek, TV Guide, The Hollywood Reporter, The Ringer, IndieWire, Film School Rejects, and IGN. In 2024, Rolling Stone listed it as the 45th best TV episode of all time.
