= Chapter One: Make Your Mark =

- Barry episode
- Episode no.: Season 1 Episode 1
- Directed by: Bill Hader
- Written by: Alec Berg; Bill Hader
- Cinematography by: Paula Huidobro; Brandon Trost
- Editing by: Jeff Buchanan
- Original air date: March 25, 2018
- Running time: 33 minutes

Guest appearances
- Tyler Jacob Moore as Ryan Madison; Mia Juel as Oksana Pazar; Mo Anouti as "Thick Neck"; Dennis Keiffer as "Lucky"; Melissa Villaseñor as Diner Waitress

Episode chronology
← Previous —	Next → "Chapter Two: Use It"

"Chapter One: Make Your Mark" is the pilot episode of the American crime tragicomedy television series Barry. It was directed by Bill Hader, who stars in the title role, and co-written with Alec Berg. The episode establishes the plot of the series, about an American Marine Corps veteran turned hitman who decides to pursue an acting career after following a mark to acting class. It aired on March 25, 2018, on HBO.

"Chapter One: Make Your Mark" received critical acclaim. For the episode, Hader won a Directors Guild of America Award for Outstanding Directorial Achievement in Comedy Series.

== Plot ==
Barry Berkman (Bill Hader) is a Marine Corps veteran and a hitman based in Cleveland, Ohio, who has grown weary of his criminal lifestyle. Returning home after completing a job, Barry is given an assignment for the Chechen mob in Los Angeles by Monroe Fuches (Stephen Root), his handler and mentor who hopes the scenery change will help with his burnout.

In Los Angeles, Barry meets Chechen mob boss Goran Pazar (Glenn Fleshler) and his right-hand man "NoHo Hank" (Anthony Carrigan) at the former's luxury house. His target is Ryan Madison (Tyler Jacob Moore), a personal trainer and aspiring actor with whom Goran's wife Oksana (Mia Juel) is having an affair.

Barry follows Ryan to his acting class at a community center where he encounters a woman (Sarah Goldberg) who chastises him for breaking her concentration while she is rehearsing. Barry follows her inside and sees the woman, Sally Reed, performing brilliantly on stage after the class's eccentric but skillful teacher, Gene Cousineau (Henry Winkler), taps into her emotional potential. Ryan drags a surprised Barry into helping him act out a scene from the film True Romance. Barry blankly reads his lines but experiences a moment of euphoria as he hears the students applaud Ryan.

After class, Sally invites Barry to join the students at a bar, where she and the acting students brainstorm monologues Barry can prepare for class. Barry becomes infatuated with Sally, and Ryan, whose real name is Richard Krempf, proposes that Barry use the stage name "Barry Block". Afterward, Barry drives Ryan to his apartment, where Ryan gives Barry a copy of Gene's acting book and a hug, the latter of which is seen by Hank and his henchman surveilling the building.

The next morning, Fuches warns Barry that Chechens will kill them if Ryan isn't killed and that acting is incompatible with being a hitman. At night, Barry approaches Gene in the community center parking lot. Though Gene denounces him and tells him he is not cut out for acting, Barry confesses that he is a hitman but wants to turn his life around. Gene assumes Barry was improvising a monologue and accepts him into the class. When Gene asks Barry for his name again, Barry introduces himself as Barry Block.

Later, Barry approaches Ryan's car, preparing to kill him, but discovers that he has already been shot dead. Hank and two henchmen try to kill Barry, but Barry wounds Hank and fatally shoots the other henchmen. Barry, unaware that his actions were recorded on Hank's lipstick camera, hides from police in a nearby diner. Served by a waitress (Melissa Villaseñor) learning lines for an audition, Barry tells her that he is also an actor.

== Production ==
In 2014, Hader signed a development deal with HBO and approached co-show runner Alec Berg to help him develop a television series. Barry is Hader's first directing project and first major project after leaving Saturday Night Live.

== Release ==
The episode was released on HBO on March 25, 2018.

== Reception ==
=== Critical response ===
The episode received critical acclaim. Charles Bramesco gave the episode 5/5 stars in a review for Vulture. Of Bill Hader's acting in the pilot, Vikram Murthi wrote for The A.V. Club, "Hader’s restrained portrait of depression elevates the winning material in interesting ways, especially in the acting scenes...Barry might have spoken his lines in a rushed, monotone voice, but the polite applause, though directed at Ryan, was enough for him to catch the bug."

=== Awards and nominations ===
The episode was nominated for two Primetime Emmy Awards in the Outstanding Directing for a Comedy Series and Outstanding Writing for a Comedy Series. The Writers Guild of America nominated Bill Hader and Alec Berg in the Television: Episodic Comedy category.

Hader won a Directors Guild of America Award for Outstanding Directorial Achievement in Comedy Series.
