= Alec Berg =

American screenwriter (born 1969/70)

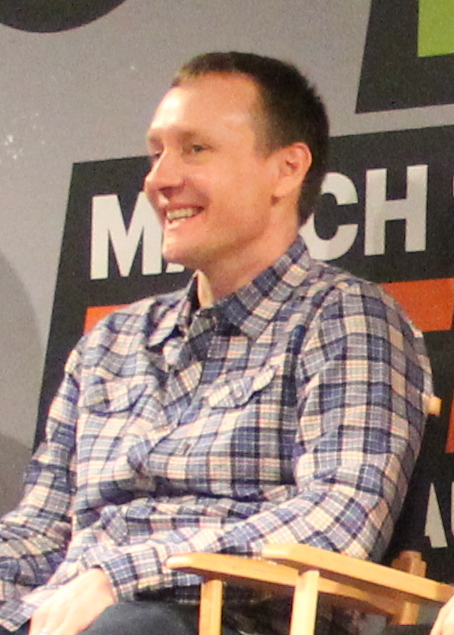
- Berg in 2016
- Born: 1969 or 1970 (age 55–56); Boston, Massachusetts, U.S.
- Education: Harvard University
- Occupations: Screenwriter; producer; director
- Years active: 1991–present
- Known for: Seinfeld; Curb Your Enthusiasm; EuroTrip; The Dictator; Silicon Valley; Barry

Alec Berg (born 1969 or 1970) is an American television writer, producer, and director.

== Early life and education ==
Berg was born in Boston, Massachusetts, to a biophysicist father and professor mother. He is of Swedish descent. He grew up idolizing the comedy of Bill Cosby and Steve Martin. He attended high school in Pasadena, California, before graduating from Harvard University, where he wrote for The Harvard Lampoon.

== Career ==
Berg wrote for the final four seasons of the sitcom Seinfeld, as well as being the co-creator (with Bill Hader) and executive producer of Barry. He also co-wrote the screenplays for the films The Cat in the Hat, EuroTrip, and The Dictator. Berg is also an executive producer (and sometime director) of Larry David's Curb Your Enthusiasm as well as an executive producer of Silicon Valley. In 2016, Berg signed an overall deal with HBO.

Berg's name was used for a character in the Seinfeld episode "The Face Painter," where it is pronounced "Alec Buuurg" in a low dramatic voice. This practice was begun by Larry David when addressing the real life Berg, and it spread throughout the Seinfeld offices. Berg said he was surprised to see his name in the script, and is occasionally addressed in that manner after "The Face Painter" is shown on television. Berg was also the inspiration for a character in the Curb Your Enthusiasm episode "The Divorce," featuring a lawyer of the same name whom Larry assumes to be Jewish but is a Catholic of Swedish descent.

== Filmography ==
Film

Year	Title	Director	Writer	Producer
2003	The Cat in the Hat	No	Yes	No
2004	EuroTrip	Uncredited	Yes	Yes
2012	The Dictator	No	Yes	Yes
2013	Clear History	No	Yes	Yes

Television

Year	Title	Director	Writer	Producer	
1991	MTV, Give Me Back My Life: A Harvard Lampoon Parody	No	Yes	No	TV movie
1992	Great Scott!	No	Yes	No	Episode "Date Bait"
1994	Herman's Head	No	Yes	Yes	Episode "Absence Makes the Head Grow Fonder"
1995–2000	The Moxy & Flea Show	No	Yes	No	
1996	68th Academy Awards	No	Yes	No	Wrote special material
1994–1998	Seinfeld	No	Yes	Yes	13 episodes
2002	The Barenaked Ladies Show	No	Yes	No	TV movie
1994, 1998–2009	Late Night with Conan O'Brien	No	Yes	No	13 episodes
2007-2011	Curb Your Enthusiasm	Yes	Yes	Yes	10 episodes (writer); 6 episodes (director)
2013	New Girl	Yes	No	No	2 episodes
2014–2019	Silicon Valley	Yes	Yes	Yes	7 episodes (writer); 11 episodes (director)
2018–2023	Barry	No	Yes	Yes	32 episodes (writer); 7 episodes (director)

Acting roles

Year	Title	Role	Notes
1999	Best Laid Plans	Phone Guy No. 1	
2019	Silicon Valley	Documentarian	Episode “Exit Event”

== Awards and nominations ==
Year	Category	Project	Result	Ref.
Primetime Emmy Awards
1997	Outstanding Comedy Series	Seinfeld (season 8)	Nominated	
1998	Outstanding Comedy Series	Seinfeld (season 9)	Nominated	
2008	Outstanding Comedy Series	Curb Your Enthusiasm (season 6)	Nominated	
2010	Outstanding Comedy Series	Curb Your Enthusiasm (season 7)	Nominated	
2012	Outstanding Comedy Series	Curb Your Enthusiasm (season 8)	Nominated	
2014	Outstanding Comedy Series	Silicon Valley (season 1)	Nominated	
2014	Outstanding Writing for a Comedy Series	Silicon Valley (episode: "Optimal Tip-to-Tip Efficiency")	Nominated	
2015	Outstanding Comedy Series	Silicon Valley (season 2)	Nominated	
2015	Outstanding Writing for a Comedy Series	Silicon Valley (episode: "Two Days of the Condor")	Nominated	
2016	Outstanding Comedy Series	Silicon Valley (season 3)	Nominated	
2016	Outstanding Writing for a Comedy Series	Silicon Valley (episode: "The Uptick")	Nominated	
2016	Outstanding Directing for a Comedy Series	Silicon Valley (episode: "Daily Active Users")	Nominated	
2017	Outstanding Comedy Series	Silicon Valley (season 4)	Nominated	
2017	Outstanding Writing for a Comedy Series	Silicon Valley (episode: "Success Failure")	Nominated	
2018	Outstanding Comedy Series	Silicon Valley (season 5)	Nominated	
2018	Outstanding Writing for a Comedy Series	Silicon Valley (episode: "Fifty-One Percent")	Nominated	
2018	Outstanding Comedy Series	Barry (Season 1)	Nominated	
2018	Outstanding Writing for a Comedy Series	Barry (episode: "Chapter One: Make Your Mark")	Nominated	
2019	Outstanding Comedy Series	Barry (Season 2)	Nominated	
2019	Outstanding Writing for a Comedy Series	Barry (episode: "ronny/lily")	Nominated	
2019	Outstanding Directing for a Comedy Series	Barry (episode: "The Audition")	Nominated	
2022	Outstanding Comedy Series	Barry (Season 3)	Nominated	
2022	Outstanding Writing for a Comedy Series	Barry (episode: "starting now")	Nominated	
2023	Outstanding Comedy Series	Barry (Season 4)	Nominated	
