= 71st Primetime Emmy Awards =

2019 American television programming awards

- Promotional poster
- Date: September 22, 2019 (Ceremony); September 14–15, 2019 (Creative Arts Emmys)
- Location: Microsoft Theater; Los Angeles, California
- Presented by: Academy of Television Arts & Sciences

Highlights
- Most awards: Major: Fleabag (4); All: Game of Thrones (12)
- Most nominations: Major: Game of Thrones (14); All: Game of Thrones (32)
- Comedy Series: Fleabag
- Drama Series: Game of Thrones
- Limited Series: Chernobyl

Television/radio coverage
- Network: Fox
- Runtime: 3 hours
- Viewership: 6.9 million
- Produced by: Don Mischer; Done and Dusted
- Directed by: Hamish Hamilton

The 71st Primetime Emmy Awards honored the best in American prime time television programming from June 1, 2018, until May 31, 2019, as chosen by the Academy of Television Arts & Sciences. The ceremony was held on September 22, 2019, at the Microsoft Theater in Downtown Los Angeles, California, and was broadcast in the United States by Fox; it was preceded by the 71st Primetime Creative Arts Emmy Awards on September 14 and 15. The show did not have a host for the fourth time in its history, following the telecasts in 2003 (when the ceremony also aired on Fox), 1998 (on NBC), and 1975 (on CBS).

At the main ceremony, Fleabag led all programs with four wins and won the award for Outstanding Comedy Series. Game of Thrones won two awards, including its record-tying fourth win for Outstanding Drama Series. Chernobyl received the award for Outstanding Limited Series among its three wins. Other overall program awards went to Black Mirror: Bandersnatch, Last Week Tonight with John Oliver, RuPaul's Drag Race, and Saturday Night Live, while The Act, Barry, Fosse/Verdon, Killing Eve, The Marvelous Mrs. Maisel, Ozark, Pose, Succession, A Very English Scandal, and When They See Us each received at least one award. Including Creative Arts Emmys, Game of Thrones won 12 awards from 32 nominations – tying and breaking the single-season records, respectively – and helped HBO to 34 total wins, the most of any network. Watched by 6.9 million viewers in the United States, it was the lowest-rated Emmy broadcast in history, amounting to a 32% drop from the 2018 ceremony.

== Winners and nominees ==
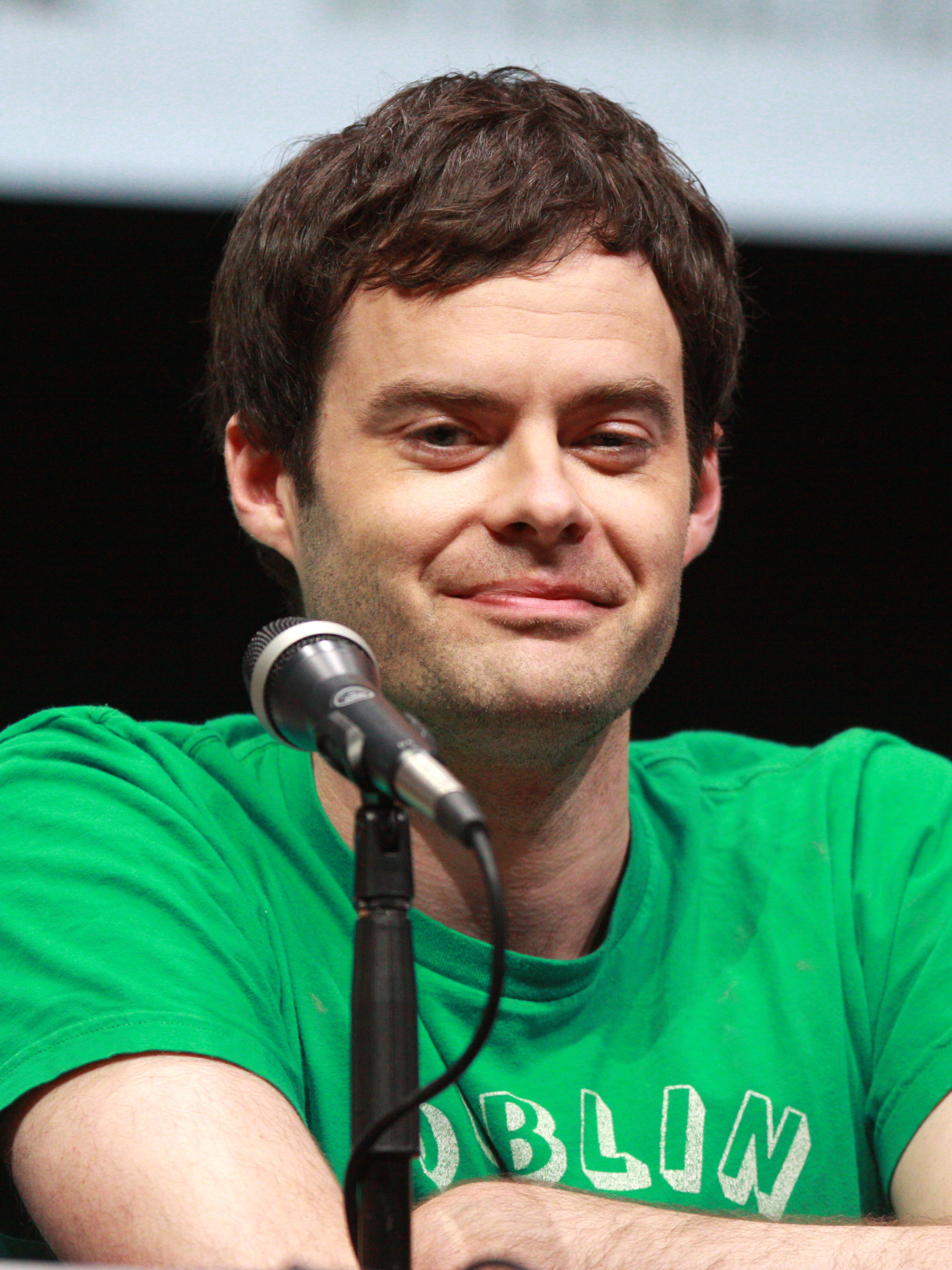
Bill Hader, Outstanding Lead Actor in a Comedy Series winner

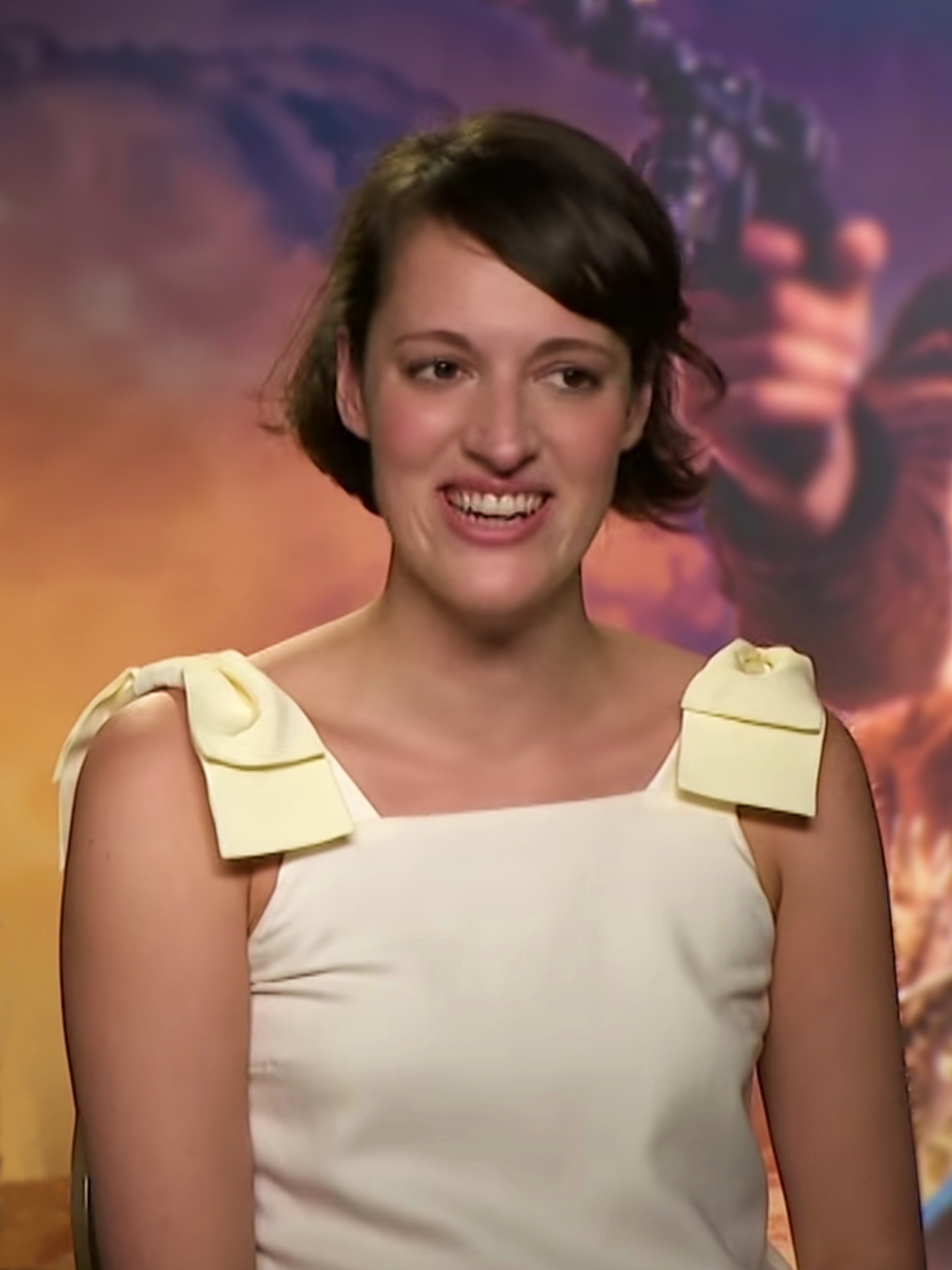
Phoebe Waller-Bridge, Outstanding Lead Actress in a Comedy Series winner

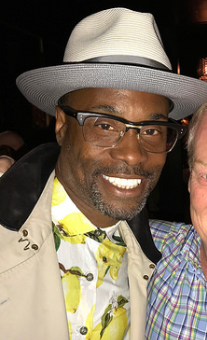
Billy Porter, Outstanding Lead Actor in Drama Series winner

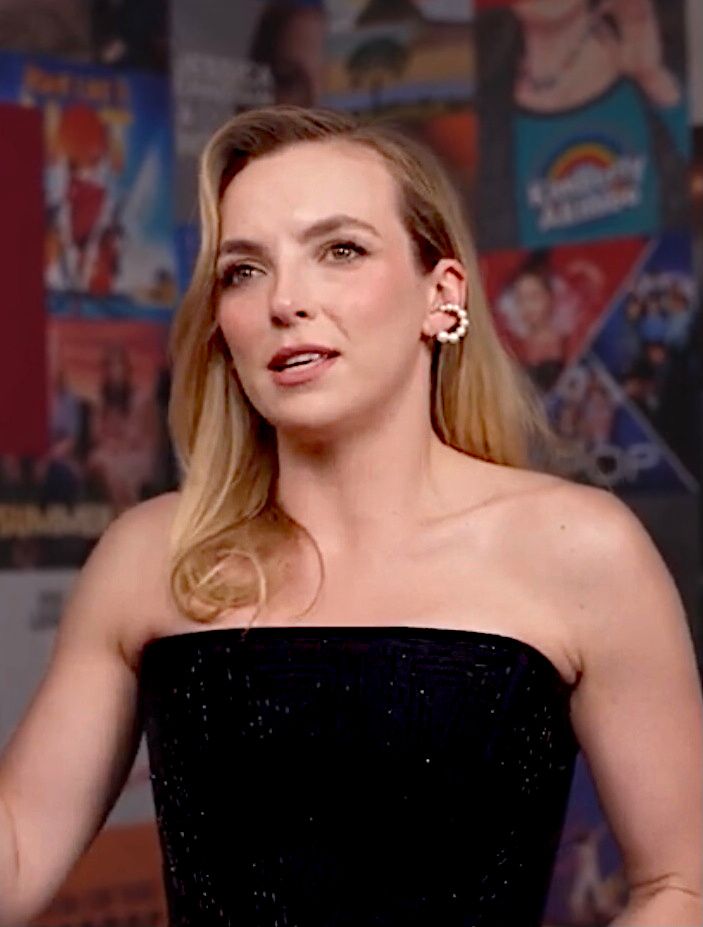
Jodie Comer, Outstanding Lead Actress in a Drama Series winner

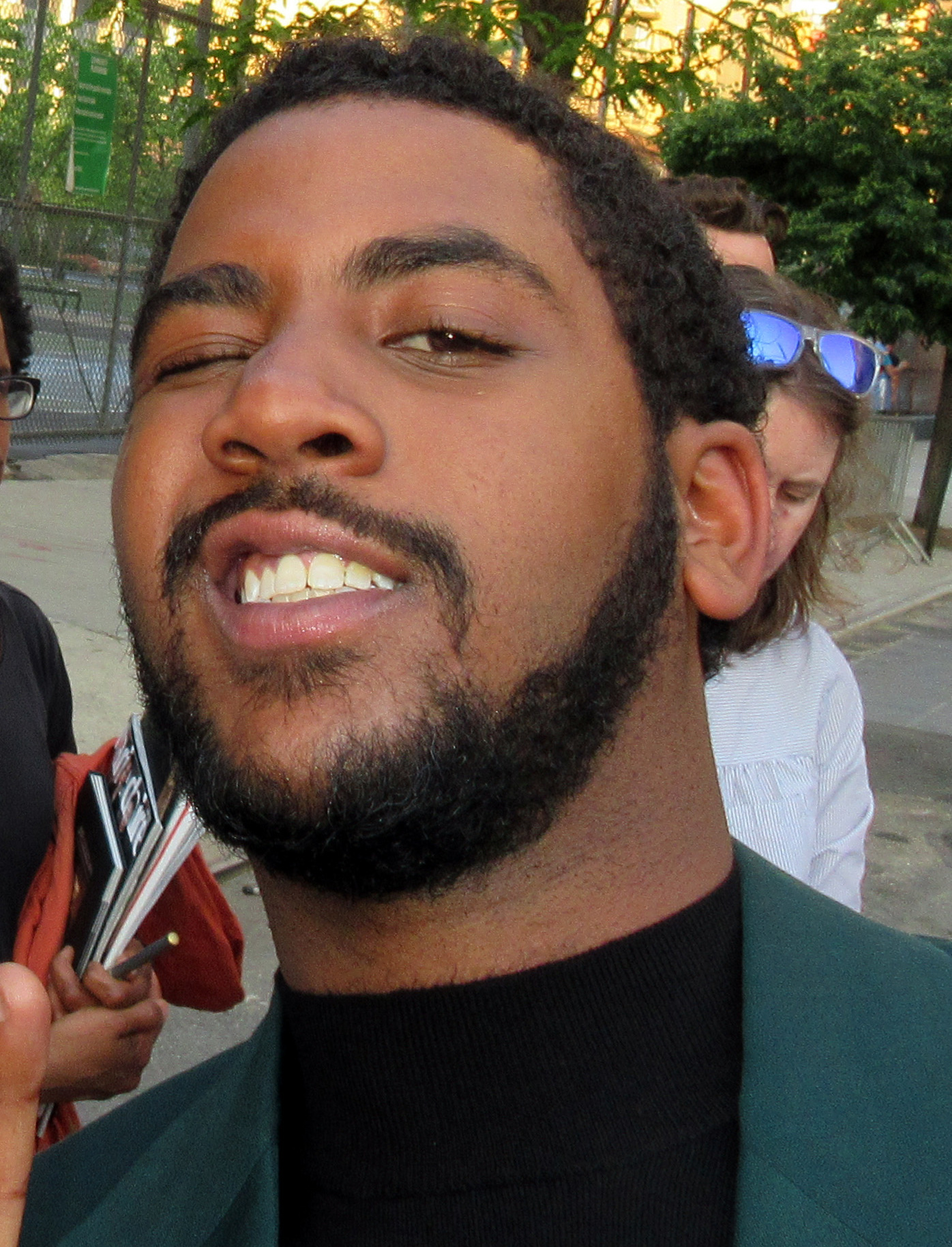
Jharrel Jerome, Outstanding Lead Actor in a Limited Series or Movie winner

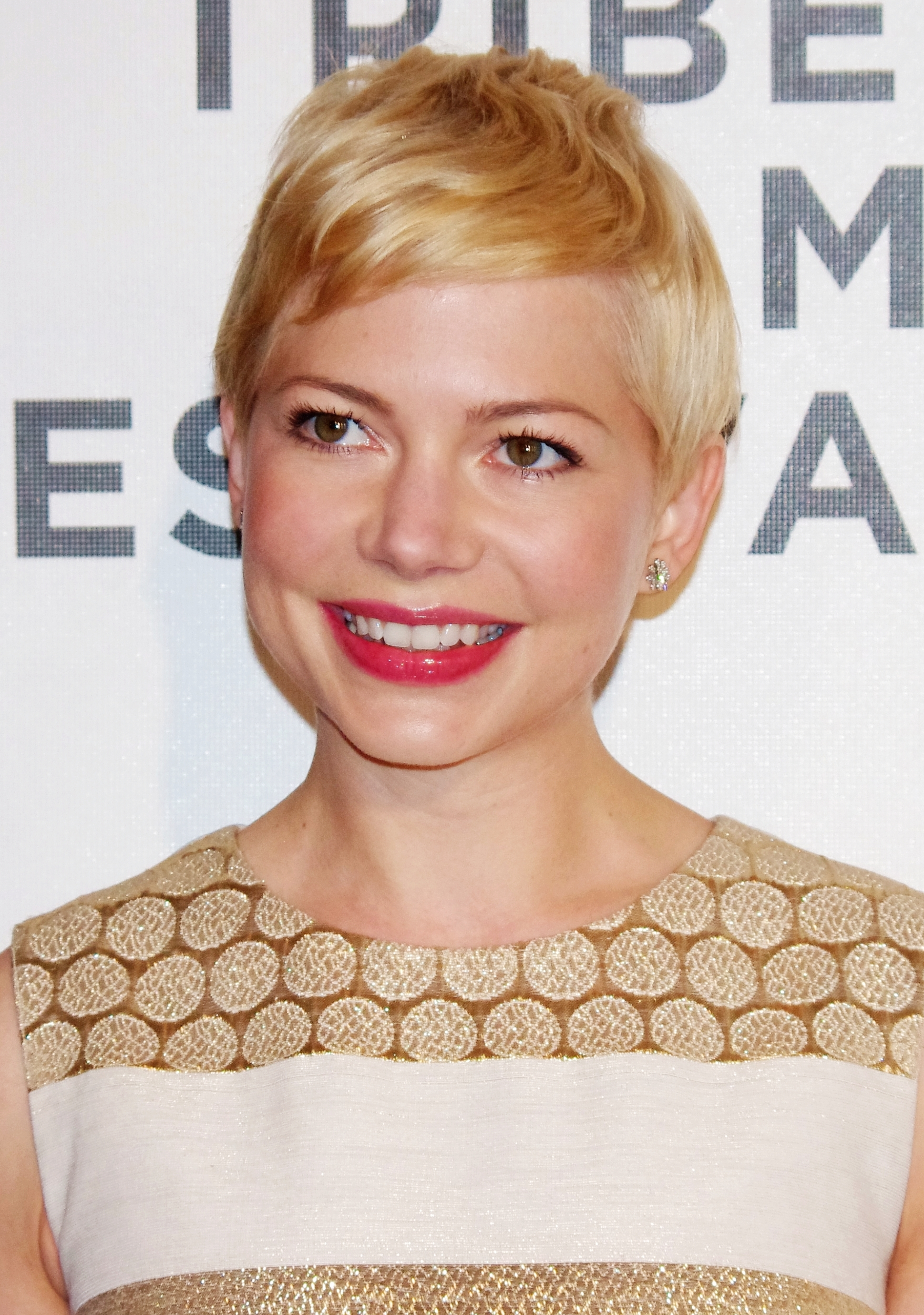
Michelle Williams, Outstanding Lead Actress in a Limited Series or Movie winner

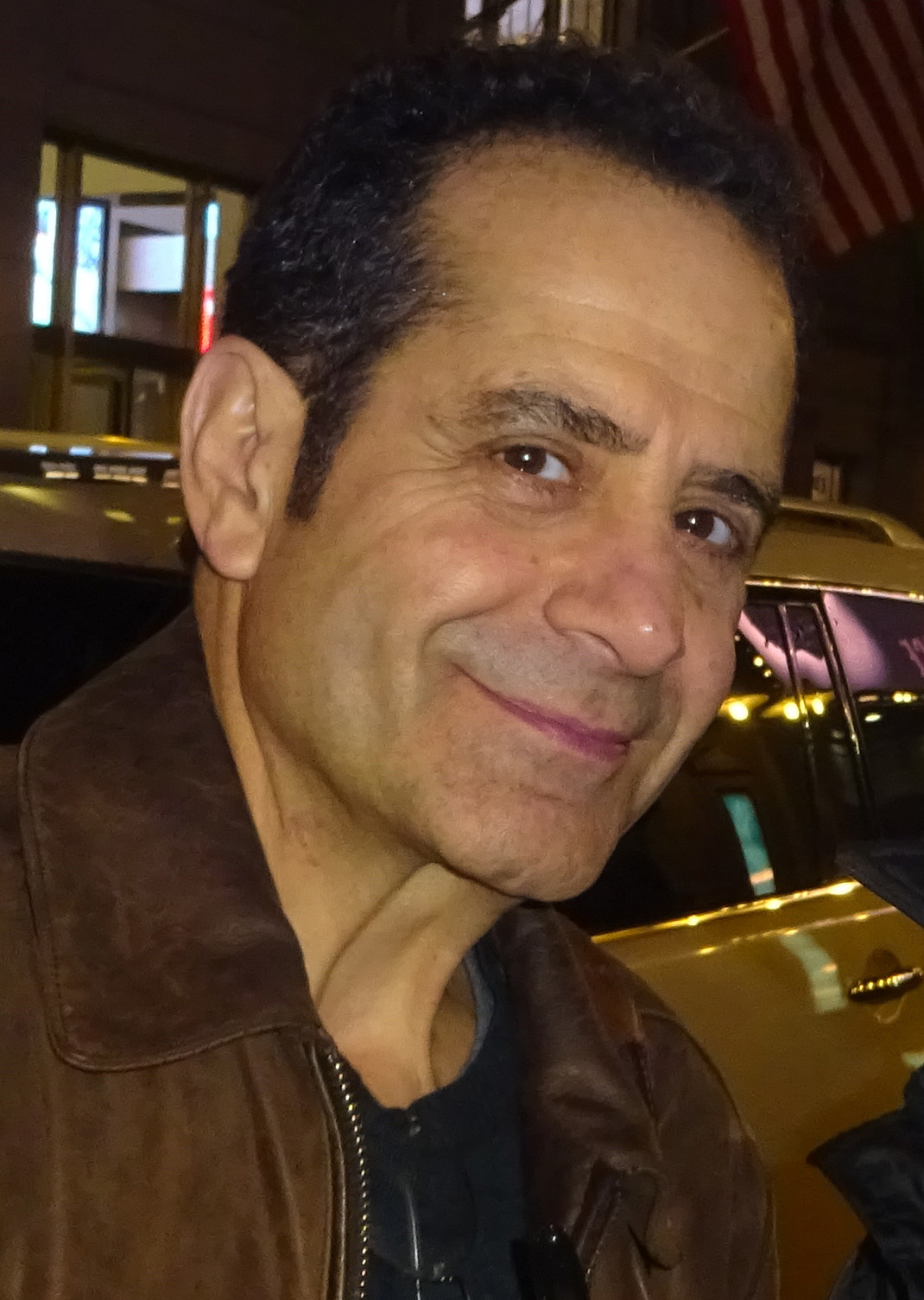
Tony Shalhoub, Outstanding Supporting Actor in a Comedy Series winner

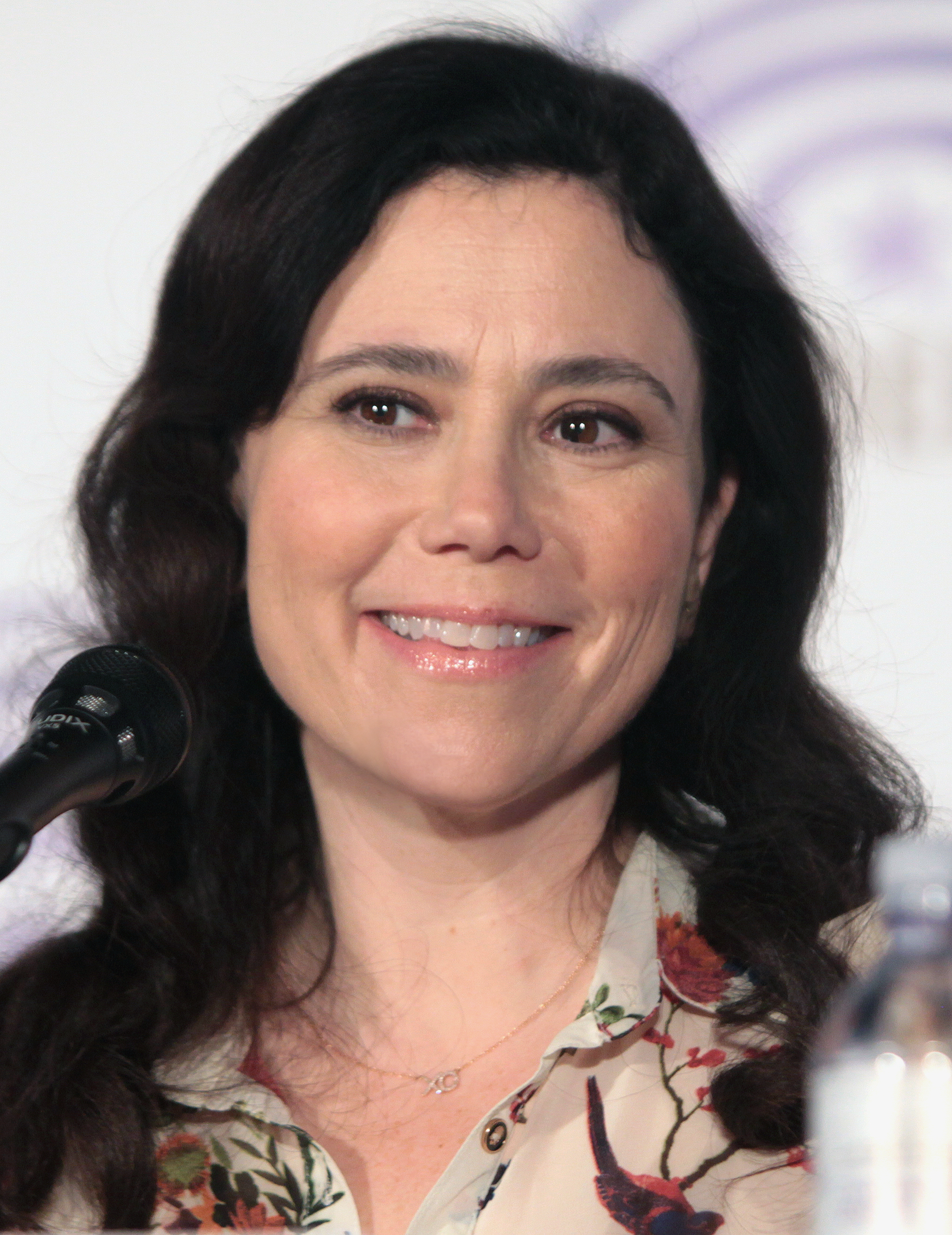
Alex Borstein, Outstanding Supporting Actress in a Comedy Series winner

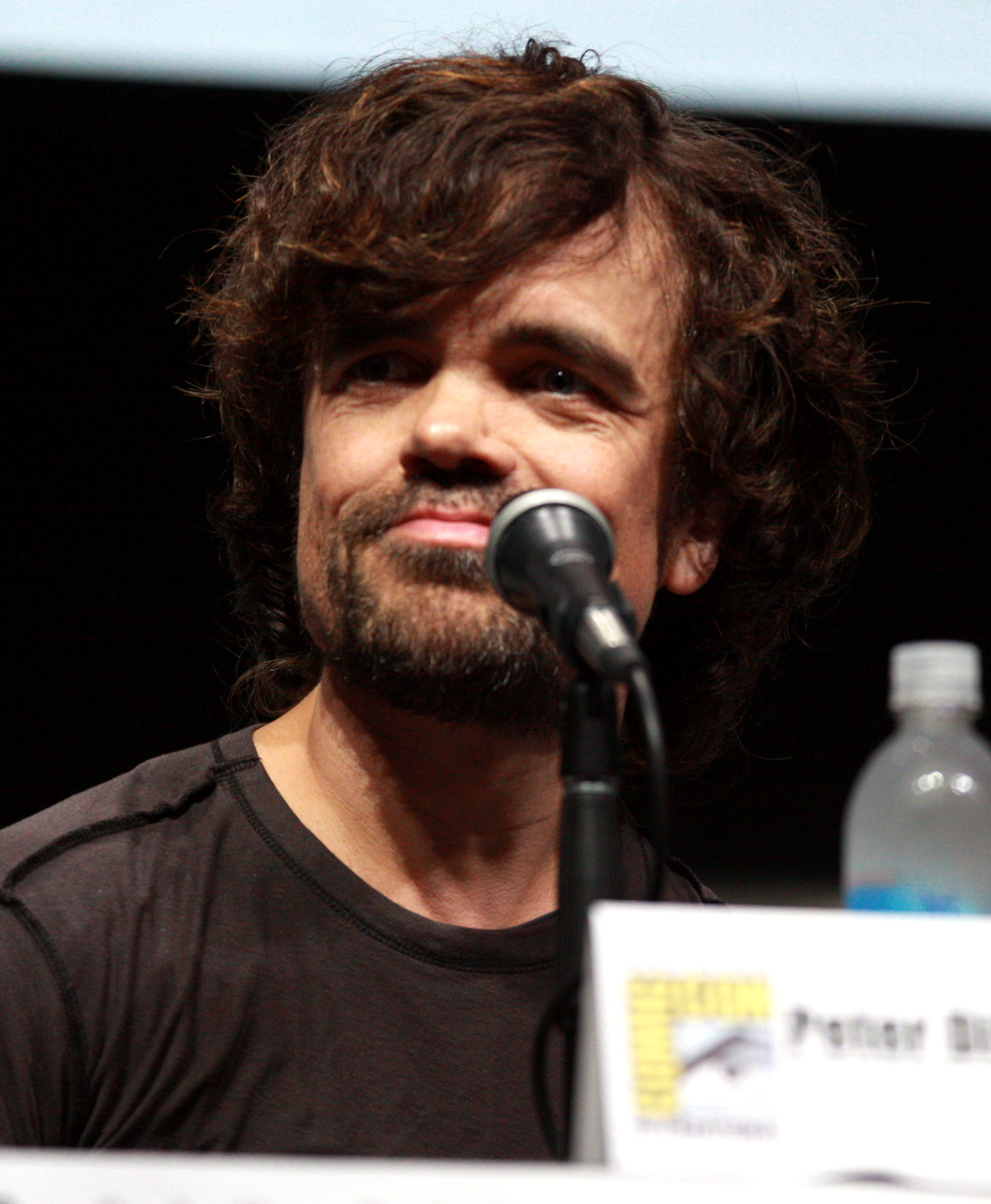
Peter Dinklage, Outstanding Supporting Actor in a Drama Series winner

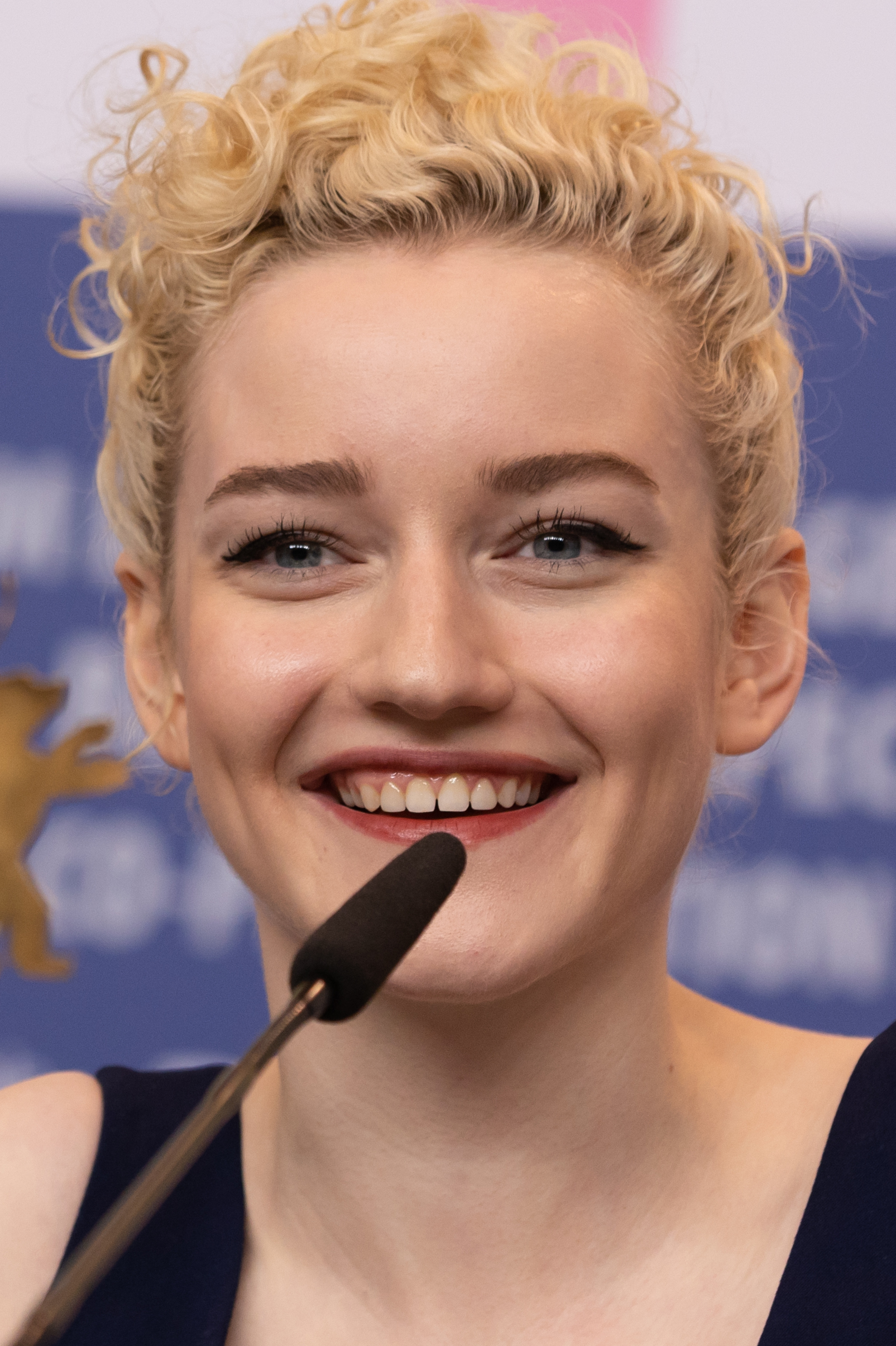
Julia Garner, Outstanding Supporting Actress in a Drama Series winner

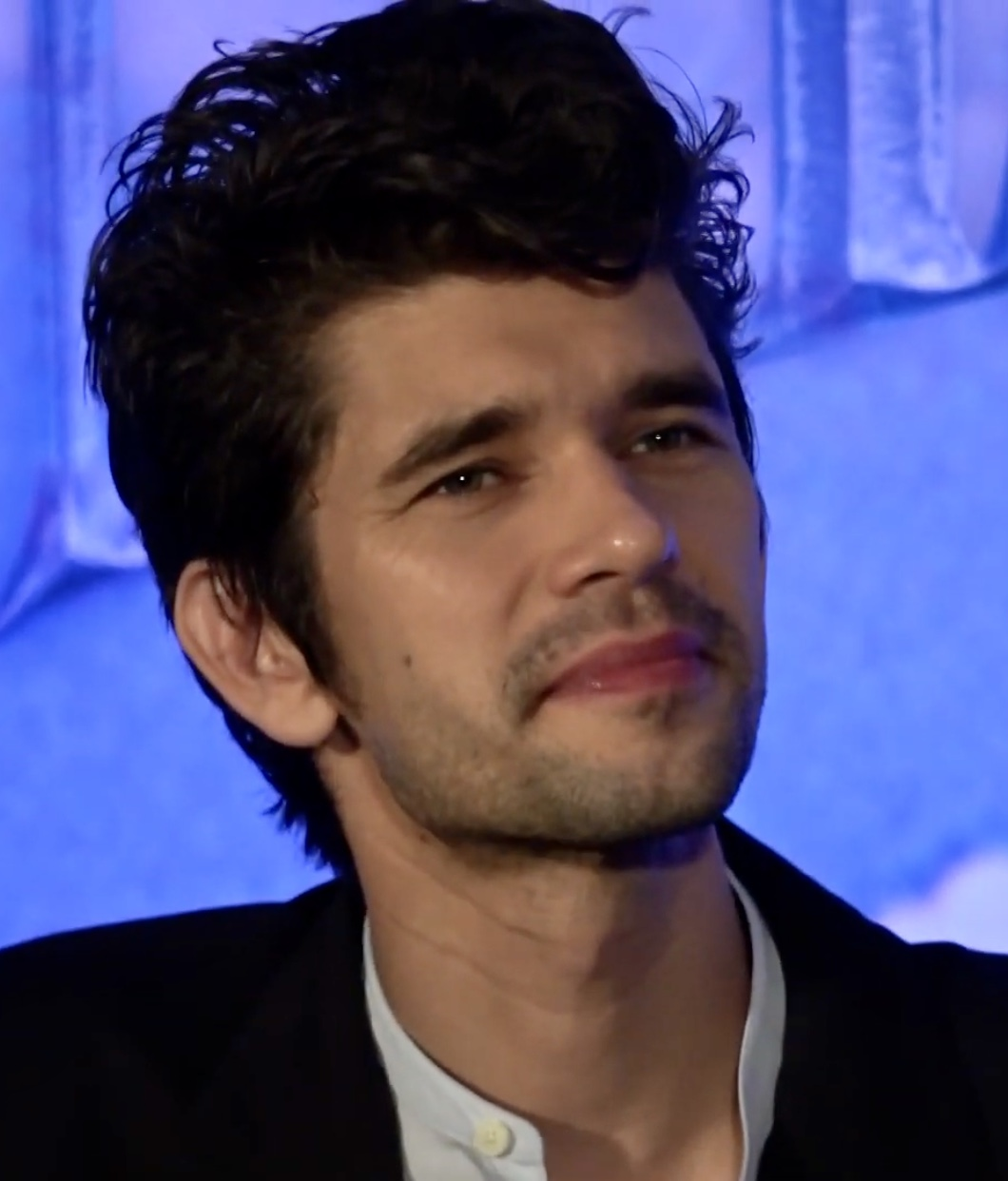
Ben Whishaw, Outstanding Supporting Actor in a Limited Series or Movie winner

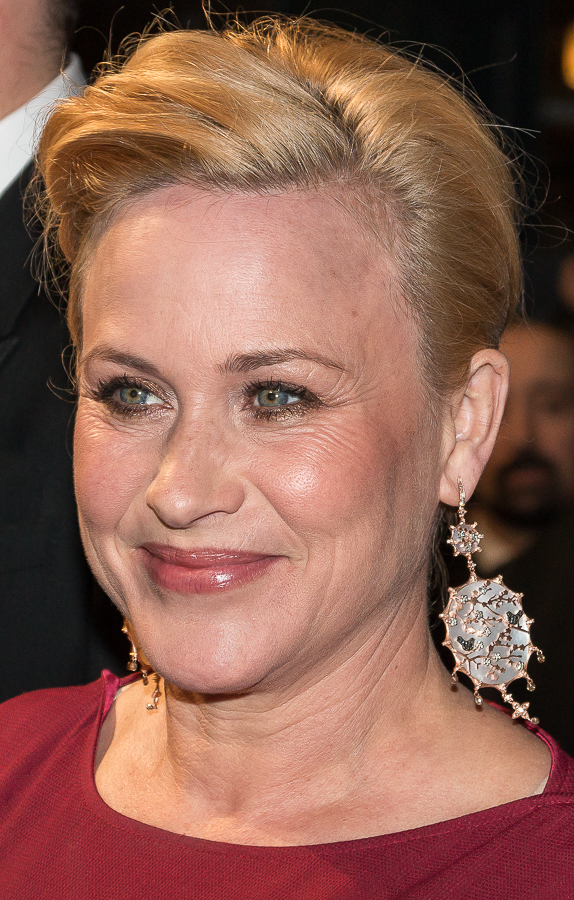
Patricia Arquette, Outstanding Supporting Actress in a Limited Series or Movie winner

The nominations were announced by D'Arcy Carden and Ken Jeong alongside Academy chairman and CEO Frank Scherma on July 16, 2019. Including its nominations at the 71st Primetime Creative Arts Emmy Awards, Game of Thrones established a new record for the most Emmy nominations received in a single year by any comedy or drama series with 32 nominations, breaking the record of 26 nominations set by NYPD Blue in 1994. Game of Thrones also extended its own record for most total nominations for a scripted series, ending with 161 nods across its eight-season run, and it finished tied for the second-most nominations for Outstanding Drama Series, its eight nominations trailing only Law & Order's 11. HBO returned to its status as the most-nominated network after being surpassed the previous year by Netflix, earning a record-setting 137 nominations to beat its own record from 2015. Pop TV received its first ever Emmy nominations, earning four nominations with Schitt's Creek.

The main ceremony was held on September 22. Fleabag led all shows with four wins, with Phoebe Waller-Bridge winning three of those for producing, writing, and acting on the show. Fleabag's win for Outstanding Comedy Series gave Prime Video its second straight win in the category. The Marvelous Mrs. Maisel also performed well for Prime Video, tying its record of eight wins from the previous year between the main and Creative Arts ceremonies. British television shows such as Fleabag and Chernobyl had strong showings; according to Deadline Hollywood, 13 of 27 awards went to shows produced or co-produced by British individuals.

Game of Thrones broke or tied several records with its wins. Its fourth win for Outstanding Drama Series tied it with Hill Street Blues, L.A. Law, The West Wing, and Mad Men for most wins in the category. When including its Creative Arts wins, the show tied its own record for most Emmys won by a series in a single season with 12 awards, a feat it previously achieved in 2015 and 2016. It ended its run with 59 total Emmys, extending its record for most wins for a scripted series. Cast member Peter Dinklage established a new record for most wins for Outstanding Supporting Actor in a Drama Series with his fourth win and eighth nomination for the series.

For his role on Pose, Billy Porter made history as the first openly gay man to win Outstanding Lead Actor in a Drama Series. Jharrel Jerome became the first Afro-Latino to receive an Emmy for acting, winning Outstanding Lead Actor in a Limited Series or Movie for playing Korey Wise on When They See Us; he also became the youngest actor to win the category, at 21 years old. In the Outstanding Lead Actress in a Drama Series category, Jodie Comer became the youngest winner at 26 years old for her performance on Killing Eve.

Winners are listed first, highlighted in boldface, and indicated with a double dagger (‡). (Note: The outlets listed for each program are the U.S. broadcasters or streaming services identified in the nominations, which for some international productions are different from the broadcaster(s) that originally commissioned the program.) For simplicity, producers who received nominations for program awards, as well as nominated writers for Outstanding Writing for a Variety Series, have been omitted.

=== Programs ===
Programs
**Outstanding Comedy Series**: **Fleabag (Prime Video)**‡; Barry (HBO); The Good Place (NBC); The Marvelous Mrs. Maisel (Prime Video); Russian Doll (Netflix); Schitt's Creek (Pop TV); Veep (HBO)	**Outstanding Drama Series**: **Game of Thrones (HBO)**‡; Better Call Saul (AMC); Bodyguard (Netflix); Killing Eve (BBC America); Ozark (Netflix); Pose (FX); Succession (HBO); This Is Us (NBC)
**Outstanding Limited Series**: **Chernobyl (HBO)**‡; Escape at Dannemora (Showtime); Fosse/Verdon (FX); Sharp Objects (HBO); When They See Us (Netflix)	**Outstanding Television Movie**: **Bandersnatch (Black Mirror) (Netflix)**‡; Brexit (HBO); Deadwood: The Movie (HBO); King Lear (Prime Video); My Dinner with Hervé (HBO)
**Outstanding Variety Talk Series**: **Last Week Tonight with John Oliver (HBO)**‡; The Daily Show with Trevor Noah (Comedy Central); Full Frontal with Samantha Bee (TBS); Jimmy Kimmel Live! (ABC); The Late Late Show with James Corden (CBS); The Late Show with Stephen Colbert (CBS)	**Outstanding Variety Sketch Series**: **Saturday Night Live (NBC)**‡; At Home with Amy Sedaris (truTV); Documentary Now! (IFC); Drunk History (Comedy Central); I Love You, America with Sarah Silverman (Hulu); Who Is America? (Showtime)
**Outstanding Competition Program**: **RuPaul's Drag Race (VH1)**‡; The Amazing Race (CBS); American Ninja Warrior (NBC); Nailed It! (Netflix); Top Chef (Bravo); The Voice (NBC)

=== Acting ===
==== Lead performances ====
Lead performances
**Outstanding Lead Actor in a Comedy Series**: **Bill Hader – Barry as Barry (HBO)**‡; Anthony Anderson – Black-ish as Andre "Dre" Johnson (ABC); Don Cheadle – Black Monday as Maurice "Mo" Monroe (Showtime); Ted Danson – The Good Place as Michael (NBC); Michael Douglas – The Kominsky Method as Sandy Kominsky (Netflix); Eugene Levy – Schitt's Creek as Johnny Rose (Pop TV)	**Outstanding Lead Actress in a Comedy Series**: **Phoebe Waller-Bridge – Fleabag as Fleabag (Prime Video)**‡; Christina Applegate – Dead to Me as Jen (Netflix); Rachel Brosnahan – The Marvelous Mrs. Maisel as Miriam "Midge" Maisel (Prime Video); Julia Louis-Dreyfus – Veep as Selina Meyer (HBO); Natasha Lyonne – Russian Doll as Nadia (Netflix); Catherine O'Hara – Schitt's Creek as Moira Rose (Pop TV)
**Outstanding Lead Actor in a Drama Series**: **Billy Porter – Pose as Pray Tell (FX)**‡; Jason Bateman – Ozark as Martin "Marty" Byrde (Netflix); Sterling K. Brown – This Is Us as Randall Pearson (NBC); Kit Harington – Game of Thrones as Jon Snow (HBO); Bob Odenkirk – Better Call Saul as Jimmy McGill (AMC); Milo Ventimiglia – This Is Us as Jack Pearson (NBC)	**Outstanding Lead Actress in a Drama Series**: **Jodie Comer – Killing Eve as Villanelle (BBC America)**‡; Emilia Clarke – Game of Thrones as Daenerys Targaryen (HBO); Viola Davis – How to Get Away with Murder as Annalise Keating (ABC); Laura Linney – Ozark as Wendy Byrde (Netflix); Mandy Moore – This Is Us as Rebecca Pearson (NBC); Sandra Oh – Killing Eve as Eve Polastri (BBC America); Robin Wright – House of Cards as Claire Underwood (Netflix)
**Outstanding Lead Actor in a Limited Series or Movie**: **Jharrel Jerome – When They See Us as Korey Wise (Netflix)**‡; Mahershala Ali – True Detective as Wayne Hays (HBO); Benicio del Toro – Escape at Dannemora as Richard Matt (Showtime); Hugh Grant – A Very English Scandal as Jeremy Thorpe (Prime Video); Jared Harris – Chernobyl as Valery Legasov (HBO); Sam Rockwell – Fosse/Verdon as Bob Fosse (FX)	**Outstanding Lead Actress in a Limited Series or Movie**: **Michelle Williams – Fosse/Verdon as Gwen Verdon (FX)**‡; Amy Adams – Sharp Objects as Camille Preaker (HBO); Patricia Arquette – Escape at Dannemora as Joyce "Tilly" Mitchell (Showtime); Aunjanue Ellis – When They See Us as Sharon Salaam (Netflix); Joey King – The Act as Gypsy Rose Blanchard (Hulu); Niecy Nash – When They See Us as Delores Wise (Netflix)

==== Supporting performances ====
Supporting performances
**Outstanding Supporting Actor in a Comedy Series**: **Tony Shalhoub – The Marvelous Mrs. Maisel as Abe Weissman (Prime Video)**‡; Alan Arkin – The Kominsky Method as Norman Newlander (Netflix); Anthony Carrigan – Barry as NoHo Hank (HBO); Tony Hale – Veep as Gary Walsh (HBO); Stephen Root – Barry as Monroe Fuches (HBO); Henry Winkler – Barry as Gene Cousineau (HBO)	**Outstanding Supporting Actress in a Comedy Series**: **Alex Borstein – The Marvelous Mrs. Maisel as Susie Myerson (Prime Video)**‡; Anna Chlumsky – Veep as Amy Brookheimer (HBO); Sian Clifford – Fleabag as Claire (Prime Video); Olivia Colman – Fleabag as Godmother (Prime Video); Betty Gilpin – GLOW as Debbie Eagan (Netflix); Sarah Goldberg – Barry as Sally Reed (HBO); Marin Hinkle – The Marvelous Mrs. Maisel as Rose Weissman (Prime Video); Kate McKinnon – Saturday Night Live as various characters (NBC)
**Outstanding Supporting Actor in a Drama Series**: **Peter Dinklage – Game of Thrones as Tyrion Lannister (HBO)**‡; Alfie Allen – Game of Thrones as Theon Greyjoy (HBO); Jonathan Banks – Better Call Saul as Mike Ehrmantraut (AMC); Nikolaj Coster-Waldau – Game of Thrones as Jaime Lannister (HBO); Giancarlo Esposito – Better Call Saul as Gus Fring (AMC); Michael Kelly – House of Cards as Doug Stamper (Netflix); Chris Sullivan – This Is Us as Toby Damon (NBC)	**Outstanding Supporting Actress in a Drama Series**: **Julia Garner – Ozark as Ruth Langmore (Netflix)**‡; Gwendoline Christie – Game of Thrones as Brienne of Tarth (HBO); Lena Headey – Game of Thrones as Cersei Lannister (HBO); Fiona Shaw – Killing Eve as Carolyn Martens (BBC America); Sophie Turner – Game of Thrones as Sansa Stark (HBO); Maisie Williams – Game of Thrones as Arya Stark (HBO)
**Outstanding Supporting Actor in a Limited Series or Movie**: **Ben Whishaw – A Very English Scandal as Norman (Prime Video)**‡; Asante Blackk – When They See Us as Kevin Richardson (Netflix); Paul Dano – Escape at Dannemora as David Sweat (Showtime); John Leguizamo – When They See Us as Raymond Santana Sr. (Netflix); Stellan Skarsgård – Chernobyl as Boris Shcherbina (HBO); Michael K. Williams – When They See Us as Bobby McCray (Netflix)	**Outstanding Supporting Actress in a Limited Series or Movie**: **Patricia Arquette – The Act as Dee Dee Blanchard (Hulu)**‡; Marsha Stephanie Blake – When They See Us as Linda McCray (Netflix); Patricia Clarkson – Sharp Objects as Adora Crellin (HBO); Vera Farmiga – When They See Us as Elizabeth Lederer (Netflix); Margaret Qualley – Fosse/Verdon as Ann Reinking (FX); Emily Watson – Chernobyl as Ulana Khomyuk (HBO)

=== Directing ===
Directing
**Outstanding Directing for a Comedy Series**: **Fleabag: "Episode 1" – Harry Bradbeer (Prime Video)**‡; Barry: "The Audition" – Alec Berg (HBO); Barry: "ronny/lily" – Bill Hader (HBO); The Big Bang Theory: "The Stockholm Syndrome" – Mark Cendrowski (CBS); The Marvelous Mrs. Maisel: "All Alone" – Amy Sherman-Palladino (Prime Video); The Marvelous Mrs. Maisel: "We're Going to the Catskills!" – Daniel Palladino (Prime Video)	**Outstanding Directing for a Drama Series**: **Ozark: "Reparations" – Jason Bateman (Netflix)**‡; Game of Thrones: "The Iron Throne" – David Benioff and D. B. Weiss (HBO); Game of Thrones: "The Last of the Starks" – David Nutter (HBO); Game of Thrones: "The Long Night" – Miguel Sapochnik (HBO); The Handmaid's Tale: "Holly" – Daina Reid (Hulu); Killing Eve: "Desperate Times" – Lisa Brühlmann (BBC America); Succession: "Celebration" – Adam McKay (HBO)
**Outstanding Directing for a Limited Series, Movie or Dramatic Special**: **Chernobyl – Johan Renck (HBO)**‡; Escape at Dannemora – Ben Stiller (Showtime); Fosse/Verdon: "Glory" – Jessica Yu (FX); Fosse/Verdon: "Who's Got the Pain" – Thomas Kail (FX); A Very English Scandal – Stephen Frears (Prime Video); When They See Us – Ava DuVernay (Netflix)	**Outstanding Directing for a Variety Series**: **Saturday Night Live: "Host: Adam Sandler" – Don Roy King (NBC)**‡; Documentary Now!: "Waiting for the Artist" – Alex Buono and Rhys Thomas (IFC); Drunk History: "Are You Afraid of the Drunk?" – Derek Waters (Comedy Central); Last Week Tonight with John Oliver: "Psychics" – Paul Pennolino (HBO); The Late Show with Stephen Colbert: "Live Midterm Election Show" – Jim Hoskinson (CBS); Who Is America?: "Episode 102" – Sacha Baron Cohen, Nathan Fielder, Daniel Gray Longino, and Dan Mazer (Showtime)

=== Writing ===
Writing
**Outstanding Writing for a Comedy Series**: **Fleabag: "Episode 1" – Phoebe Waller-Bridge (Prime Video)**‡; Barry: "ronny/lily" – Alec Berg and Bill Hader (HBO); The Good Place: "Janet(s)" – Josh Siegal and Dylan Morgan (NBC); PEN15: "Anna Ishii-Peters" – Maya Erskine, Anna Konkle, and Stacy Osei-Kuffour (Hulu); Russian Doll: "Nothing in This World Is Easy" – Leslye Headland, Natasha Lyonne, and Amy Poehler (Netflix); Russian Doll: "A Warm Body" – Allison Silverman (Netflix); Veep: "Veep" – David Mandel (HBO)	**Outstanding Writing for a Drama Series**: **Succession: "Nobody Is Ever Missing" – Jesse Armstrong (HBO)**‡; Better Call Saul: "Winner" – Peter Gould and Thomas Schnauz (AMC); Bodyguard: "Episode 1" – Jed Mercurio (Netflix); Game of Thrones: "The Iron Throne" – David Benioff and D. B. Weiss (HBO); The Handmaid's Tale: "Holly" – Bruce Miller and Kira Snyder (Hulu); Killing Eve: "Nice and Neat" – Emerald Fennell (BBC America)
**Outstanding Writing for a Limited Series, Movie or Dramatic Special**: **Chernobyl – Craig Mazin (HBO)**‡; Escape at Dannemora: "Part 6" – Brett Johnson, Michael Tolkin, and Jerry Stahl (Showtime); Escape at Dannemora: "Part 7" – Brett Johnson and Michael Tolkin (Showtime); Fosse/Verdon: "Providence" – Steven Levenson and Joel Fields (FX); A Very English Scandal – Russell T Davies (Prime Video); When They See Us: "Part Four" – Ava DuVernay and Michael Starrbury (Netflix)	**Outstanding Writing for a Variety Series**: **Last Week Tonight with John Oliver (HBO)**‡; Documentary Now! (IFC); Full Frontal with Samantha Bee (TBS); Late Night with Seth Meyers (NBC); The Late Show with Stephen Colbert (CBS); Saturday Night Live (NBC)

=== Nominations and wins by program ===
For the purposes of the lists below, "major" constitutes the categories listed above (program, acting, directing, and writing), while "total" includes the categories presented at the Creative Arts Emmy Awards.

Shows with multiple major nominations
Nominations	Show	Network
14	Game of Thrones	HBO
11	When They See Us	Netflix
9	Barry	HBO
7	Escape at Dannemora	Showtime
7	Fosse/Verdon	FX
7	The Marvelous Mrs. Maisel	Prime Video
6	Chernobyl	HBO
6	Fleabag	Prime Video
6	Killing Eve	BBC America
5	Better Call Saul	AMC
5	Ozark	Netflix
5	This Is Us	NBC
5	Veep	HBO
4	Russian Doll	Netflix
4	Saturday Night Live	NBC
4	A Very English Scandal	Prime Video
3	Documentary Now!	IFC
3	The Good Place	NBC
3	Last Week Tonight with John Oliver	HBO
3	The Late Show with Stephen Colbert	CBS
3	Schitt's Creek	Pop TV
3	Sharp Objects	HBO
3	Succession	HBO
2	The Act	Hulu
2	Bodyguard	Netflix
2	Drunk History	Comedy Central
2	Full Frontal with Samantha Bee	TBS
2	The Handmaid's Tale	Hulu
2	House of Cards	Netflix
2	The Kominsky Method	Netflix
2	Pose	FX
2	Who Is America?	Showtime

Shows with five or more total nominations
Nominations	Show	Network
32	Game of Thrones	HBO
20	The Marvelous Mrs. Maisel	Prime Video
19	Chernobyl	HBO
18	Saturday Night Live	NBC
17	Barry	HBO
17	Fosse/Verdon	FX
16	When They See Us	Netflix
13	Russian Doll	Netflix
12	Escape at Dannemora	Showtime
11	Fleabag	Prime Video
11	The Handmaid's Tale	Hulu
10	Our Planet	Netflix
9	Better Call Saul	AMC
9	Killing Eve	BBC America
9	Last Week Tonight with John Oliver	HBO
9	Ozark	Netflix
9	RuPaul's Drag Race	VH1
9	This Is Us	NBC
9	True Detective	HBO
9	Veep	HBO
8	Deadwood: The Movie	HBO
8	The Oscars	ABC
8	Sharp Objects	HBO
7	Free Solo	National Geographic
7	The Voice	NBC
6	Anthony Bourdain: Parts Unknown	CNN
6	Homecoming: A Film by Beyoncé	Netflix
6	Pose	FX
6	Queer Eye	Netflix
5	American Horror Story: Apocalypse	FX
5	Carpool Karaoke: When Corden Met McCartney Live from Liverpool	CBS
5	GLOW	Netflix
5	The Good Place	NBC
5	Leaving Neverland	HBO
5	RENT	Fox
5	Succession	HBO
5	World of Dance	NBC

Shows with multiple major wins
Wins	Show	Network
4	Fleabag	Prime Video
3	Chernobyl	HBO
2	Game of Thrones	HBO
2	Last Week Tonight with John Oliver	HBO
2	The Marvelous Mrs. Maisel	Prime Video
2	Ozark	Netflix
2	Saturday Night Live	NBC

Shows with multiple total wins
Wins	Show	Network
12	Game of Thrones	HBO
10	Chernobyl	HBO
8	The Marvelous Mrs. Maisel	Prime Video
7	Free Solo	National Geographic
6	Fleabag	Prime Video
5	Love, Death & Robots	Netflix
5	Saturday Night Live	NBC
4	Fosse/Verdon	FX
4	Last Week Tonight with John Oliver	HBO
4	Queer Eye	Netflix
4	RuPaul's Drag Race	VH1
3	Age of Sail	YouTube
3	Barry	HBO
3	Russian Doll	Netflix
3	State of the Union	Sundance TV
3	The Handmaid's Tale	Hulu
2	Anthony Bourdain: Parts Unknown	CNN
2	Bandersnatch (Black Mirror)	Netflix
2	Crazy Ex-Girlfriend	The CW
2	Our Planet	Netflix
2	Ozark	Netflix
2	RENT	Fox
2	Succession	HBO
2	United Shades of America with W. Kamau Bell	CNN
2	When They See Us	Netflix

=== Nominations and wins by network ===
Networks with multiple major nominations
Nominations	Network
47	HBO
30	Netflix
18	Prime Video
15	NBC
10	Showtime
9	FX
6	BBC America
6	CBS
6	Hulu
5	AMC
3	ABC
3	Comedy Central
3	IFC
3	Pop TV
2	TBS

Networks with five or more total nominations
Nominations	Network
137	HBO
118	Netflix
58	NBC
47	Prime Video
43	CBS
32	FX
26	ABC
20	Hulu
18	Fox
18	Showtime
17	CNN
15	National Geographic
14	VH1
9	AMC
9	BBC America
8	Comedy Central
5	A&E
5	TBS

Networks with multiple major wins
Wins	Network
9	HBO
7	Prime Video
4	Netflix
2	FX
2	NBC

Networks with multiple total wins
Wins	Network
34	HBO
27	Netflix
15	Prime Video
8	National Geographic
7	NBC
5	CNN
5	FX
4	CBS
4	Fox
4	Hulu
4	VH1
4	YouTube
3	Sundance TV
2	The CW

== Presenters ==
The awards were presented by the following people:

Name(s)	Role
Bob Newhart; Ben Stiller	Presenters of the award for Outstanding Supporting Actor in a Comedy Series
Catherine O'Hara; Amy Poehler	Presenters of the award for Outstanding Supporting Actress in a Comedy Series
Nick Cannon; Ken Jeong	Presenters of the award for Outstanding Writing for a Comedy Series
Lilly Singh	Introducer of Outstanding Guest Actor in a Comedy Series winner Luke Kirby and Outstanding Guest Actress in a Comedy Series winner Jane Lynch
Luke Kirby; Jane Lynch	Presenters of the award for Outstanding Directing for a Comedy Series
Ike Barinholtz; Maya Rudolph	Presenters of the award for Outstanding Lead Actor in a Comedy Series
Stephen Colbert; Jimmy Kimmel	Presenters of the award for Outstanding Lead Actress in a Comedy Series
Kendall Jenner; Kim Kardashian West	Presenters of the award for Outstanding Competition Program
Tim Allen	Introducer of the accountants from Ernst & Young
Seth Meyers	Presenter of a special tribute to Game of Thrones
Alfie Allen; Gwendoline Christie; Emilia Clarke; Nikolaj Coster-Waldau; Peter Dinklage; Kit Harington; Lena Headey; Sophie Turner; Carice van Houten; Maisie Williams	Presenters of the award for Outstanding Supporting Actress in a Limited Series or Movie
RuPaul; Zendaya	Presenters of the award for Outstanding Directing for a Limited Series, Movie, or Dramatic Special
Bill Hader; Phoebe Waller-Bridge	Presenters of the award for Outstanding Supporting Actor in a Limited Series or Movie
Jimmy Smits; Bradley Whitford	Presenters of the award for Outstanding Writing for a Limited Series, Movie, or Dramatic Special
Angela Bassett; Peter Krause	Presenters of the award for Outstanding Lead Actor in a Limited Series or Movie
James Corden	Presenter of the award for Outstanding Television Movie
Hugh Laurie	Presenter of a special tribute to Veep
Anna Chlumsky; Gary Cole; Kevin Dunn; Clea DuVall; Tony Hale; Julia Louis-Dreyfus; Sam Richardson; Reid Scott; Timothy Simons; Sarah Sutherland; Matt Walsh	Presenters of the award for Outstanding Lead Actress in a Limited Series or Movie
Jon Hamm; Naomi Watts	Presenters of the award for Outstanding Limited Series
Lin-Manuel Miranda	Presenter of the award for Outstanding Writing for a Variety Series
Anthony Anderson; Randall Park	Presenters of the award for Outstanding Variety Sketch Series
Cedric the Entertainer; Max Greenfield	Presenters of the award for Outstanding Directing for a Variety Series
Billy Porter	Presenter of the award for Outstanding Variety Talk Series
Taraji P. Henson; Terrence Howard	Presenters of a special presentation paying tribute to series ending in the 2018–19 TV season
Viola Davis	Presenter of the award for Outstanding Supporting Actor in a Drama Series
Jharrel Jerome	Introducer of Outstanding Guest Actress in a Drama Series winner Cherry Jones
Cherry Jones	Presenter of the award for Outstanding Writing for a Drama Series
Kristen Bell; Don Cheadle	Presenters of the award for Outstanding Supporting Actress in a Drama Series
Regina King	Presenter of the In Memoriam tribute
Kerry Washington	Presenter of the award for Outstanding Lead Actor in a Drama Series
Timothy Hutton; Brittany Snow	Presenters of the award for Outstanding Directing for a Drama Series
Gwyneth Paltrow	Presenter of the award for Outstanding Lead Actress in a Drama Series
Norman Lear; Marisa Tomei	Presenters of the award for Outstanding Comedy Series
Michael Douglas	Presenter of the award for Outstanding Drama Series

=== Performers ===
Name(s)	Performed
Adam DeVine	"Variety"
Halsey	"Time After Time"

== Ceremony information ==
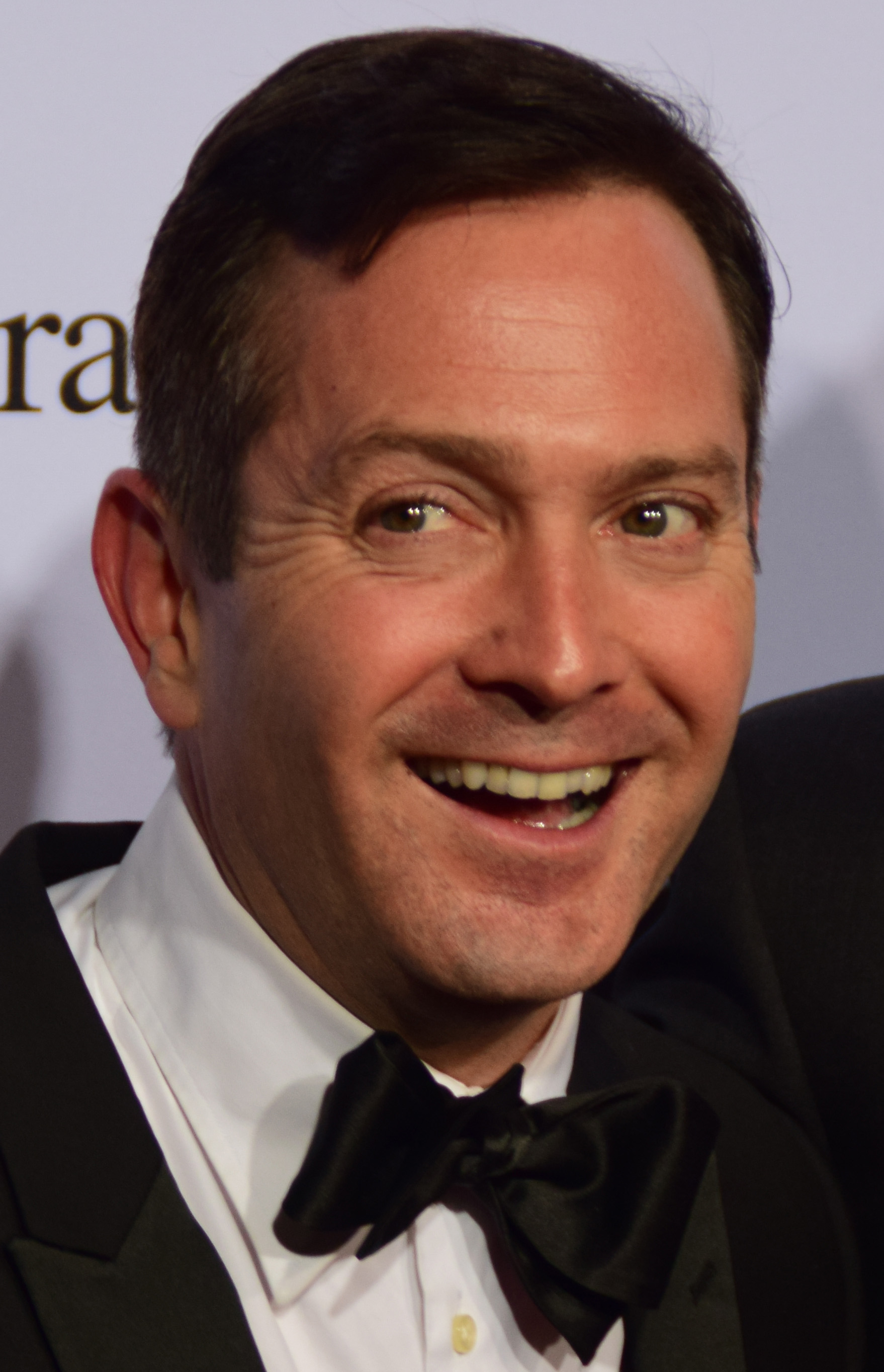
Thomas Lennon served as announcer for the "host-less" ceremony

The ceremony took place at the Microsoft Theater in Los Angeles with no host; comedian and actor Thomas Lennon served as an announcer for the ceremony, injecting with jokes and commentary as winners approached the stage to receive their Emmy. Televised by Fox, the ceremony began with a ruse where Homer Simpson appeared in an augmented-reality stage to host the event, before an animated piano dropped from the ceiling to land on The Simpsons' character. With the event now "host-less", Anthony Anderson rushed on stage in a skit where he insisted that "We're going to go without a host tonight!" and pushed the first presenter Bryan Cranston to the stage to welcome the audience and introduce a montage of video clips. The ceremony continued in such fashion with only Lennon and montages and clips filling the time between presenters.

Several winners made notable "statement speeches" while accepting their awards. After winning the award for outstanding supporting actress in a comedy series for The Marvelous Mrs. Maisel, Alex Borstein said:

My grandmother was in line to be shot into a pit... she turned to a guard and she said "What happens if I step out of line?" and he said "I don't have the heart to shoot you but somebody will". And she stepped out of line, and for that I am here and for that my children are here, so step out of line ladies, step out of line.

The winner for outstanding supporting actress in a limited series or movie, Patricia Arquette (The Act), in her acceptance speech said "I'm grateful at 50 to be getting the best parts of my life" and paid tribute to her sister, Alexis Arquette, who had died in 2016. Michelle Williams, after winning the award for outstanding lead actress in a limited series or movie for Fosse/Verdon, made references to the gender and racial wage gaps in the film industry, as well as the Time's Up movement:

The next time a woman, and especially a woman of color—because she stands to make 52 cents on the dollar compared to her white, male counterpart—tells you what she needs to do her job, listen to her, believe her, because one day she might stand in front of you and say thank you for allowing her to succeed because of her workplace environment and not in spite of it.

In the In Memoriam presentation, a photograph of conductor Leonard Slatkin, who is alive and working in Ireland, was mistakenly used and captioned as André Previn, who died in February 2019.

=== Category and rule changes ===
On April 9, 2019, it was announced that American Horror Story: Apocalypse, the eighth season of the horror anthology series American Horror Story, and the second season of The Sinner would be ineligible for the Limited Series categories unlike their previous seasons, and instead be moved to Drama due to "continuing story threads, characters and actors reprising those same character roles from previous seasons", therefore making the series less fit for an anthology format. For similar reasons, the second season of American Vandal was moved from Limited Series to Comedy. None of the shows were nominated.

=== Critical reviews and viewership ===
The telecast was watched by 6.9 million viewers in the United States, making it the lowest-rated Emmy broadcast in history, amounting to a 32% drop from the 2018 ceremony.

== In Memoriam ==
Halsey sang "Time After Time" by Cyndi Lauper and Rob Hyman. The following people were included in the In Memoriam presentation:

- John Singleton
- Doris Day
- Jan-Michael Vincent
- André Previn
- Cokie Roberts
- Sid Sheinberg
- Gloria Vanderbilt
- Tony Askins
- James Frawley
- Ron Miller
- Christopher Knopf
- Steve Golin
- Cameron Boyce
- Nancy Wilson
- Larry Siegel
- Peggy Lipton
- John Falsey
- Kristoff St. John
- Lou Weiss
- Sharon Taylor
- Roy Clark
- Tony Lynn
- Eunetta T. Boone
- Katherine Helmond
- Arte Johnson
- Tim Conway
- Tim Sullivan
- Rutger Hauer
- Sy Tomashoff
- Kevin Barnett
- Russell Kagan
- Seymour Cassel
- Bob Einstein
- Penny Marshall
- Georgia Engel
- Luke Perry
- Ken Berry
- Valerie Harper
- Peter Fonda
- Stan Lee
- Albert Finney
- Rip Torn
- Carol Channing
