= List of Primetime Emmy Awards received by HBO =

Category	Wins	Nominations
Program	25	103
Performance	115	576
Directing	30	181
Writing	32	166
- Totals
Wins	202
Nominations	1,026

HBO (Home Box Office) is an American pay television network, which is the flagship property of namesake parent-subsidiary Home Box Office, Inc., itself a unit owned by Warner Bros. Discovery.

In 2004, HBO became the first cable network to win Outstanding Drama Series for the 56th Primetime Emmy Awards with The Sopranos in its fifth season. The network continued its success in the category with wins for Six Feet Under in 2001 and True Blood in 2009. Boardwalk Empire followed with nominations in 2011 and 2012.

HBO's Game of Thrones made a significant impact, winning the Outstanding Drama Series award four times in 2015, 2016, 2018, and 2019. The network's innovative approach to television continued with Westworld, which received its first nomination in 2017, and Succession, which won the award for its second, third and fourth seasons in 2020, 2022 and 2023.

In 2001, HBO's Sex and the City became the first comedy series from the network to win Outstanding Comedy Series. In 2015, Veep won Outstanding Comedy Series, and it continued its winning streak with additional awards in 2017. Chernobyl won Outstanding Limited Series at 71st Primetime Emmy Awards and the network continued to dominate in the category with wins for Watchmen and The White Lotus in 2020 and 2022 respectively.

In total, HBO has received over 1,500 Primetime Emmy nominations across its productions and has secured more than 220 awards. The network set an all-time record with 137 nominations in 2019, highlighting its continued influence and success in television.

== Drama ==
=== Drama series ===
In 1999, The Sopranos made history as the first cable TV series to receive a nomination for the Primetime Emmy Award for Outstanding Drama Series. It was nominated in every year it was eligible—1999, 2000, 2001, and 2003—finally winning in 2004 and again in 2007. Six Feet Under earned nominations for its first four seasons in 2002, 2003, and 2004. Deadwood was nominated in 2005 for its second season. The third season of Big Love and the second season of True Blood received nominations in 2009 and 2010, respectively.

Boardwalk Empire and Game of Thrones were both nominated for their first seasons in 2011 and their second seasons in 2012. Game of Thrones went on to win the award in 2015, 2016, 2018, and 2019. Westworld debuted in the category in 2017. Succession was nominated for its first season in 2019 and won for its second and third seasons in 2020 and 2022.

In 2021, Lovecraft Country was nominated, followed by Euphoria in 2022. At the 2023 ceremony, House of the Dragon, The White Lotus, and The Last of Us received nominations, with Succession winning for its final season. In 2024, The Gilded Age made its debut in the category.

Outstanding Drama Series
Year	Series	Season	Result	Ref.
1999	The Sopranos	1	Nominated	
2000	The Sopranos	2	Nominated	
2001	The Sopranos	3	Nominated	
2002	Six Feet Under	1–2	Nominated	
2003	The Sopranos	4	Nominated	
2003	Six Feet Under	3	Nominated	
2004	The Sopranos	5	Won	
2005	Six Feet Under	4	Nominated	
2005	Deadwood	2	Nominated	
2006	The Sopranos	6	Nominated	
2007	The Sopranos	6	Won	
2009	Big Love	3	Nominated	
2010	True Blood	2	Nominated	
2011	Boardwalk Empire	1	Nominated	
2011	Game of Thrones	1	Nominated	
2012	Boardwalk Empire	2	Nominated	
2012	Game of Thrones	2	Nominated	
2013	Game of Thrones	3	Nominated	
2014	True Detective	1	Nominated	
2014	Game of Thrones	4	Nominated	
2015	Game of Thrones	5	Won	
2016	Game of Thrones	6	Won	
2017	Westworld	1	Nominated	
2018	Game of Thrones	7	Won	
2018	Westworld	2	Nominated	
2019	Succession	1	Nominated	
2019	Game of Thrones	8	Won	
2020	Succession	2	Won	
2021	Lovecraft Country	1	Nominated	
2022	Succession	3	Won	
2022	Euphoria	2	Nominated	
2023	House of the Dragon	1	Nominated	
2023	The White Lotus	2	Nominated	
2023	The Last of Us	1	Nominated	
2023	Succession	4	Won	
2024	The Gilded Age	2	Nominated	
2025	The White Lotus	3	Nominated	
2025	The Last of Us	2	Nominated	
2026	The Gilded Age	3	Nominated	
2026	A Knight of the Seven Kingdoms	1	Nominated	

=== Lead Actor / Actress ===
Lead Actor in a Drama Series

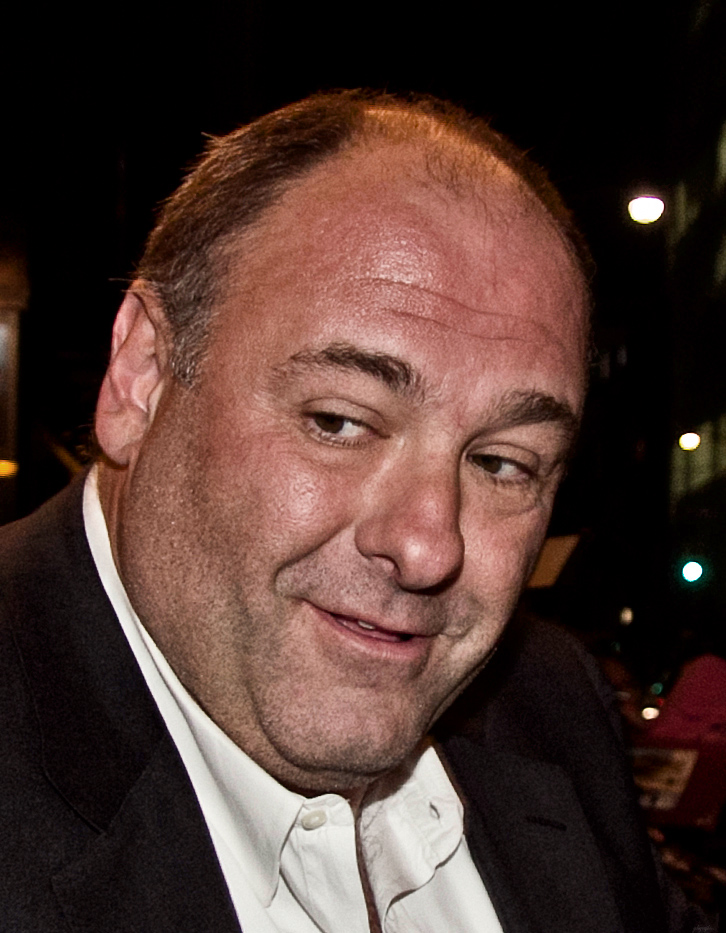
James Gandolfini won three times for his performance as Tony Soprano.

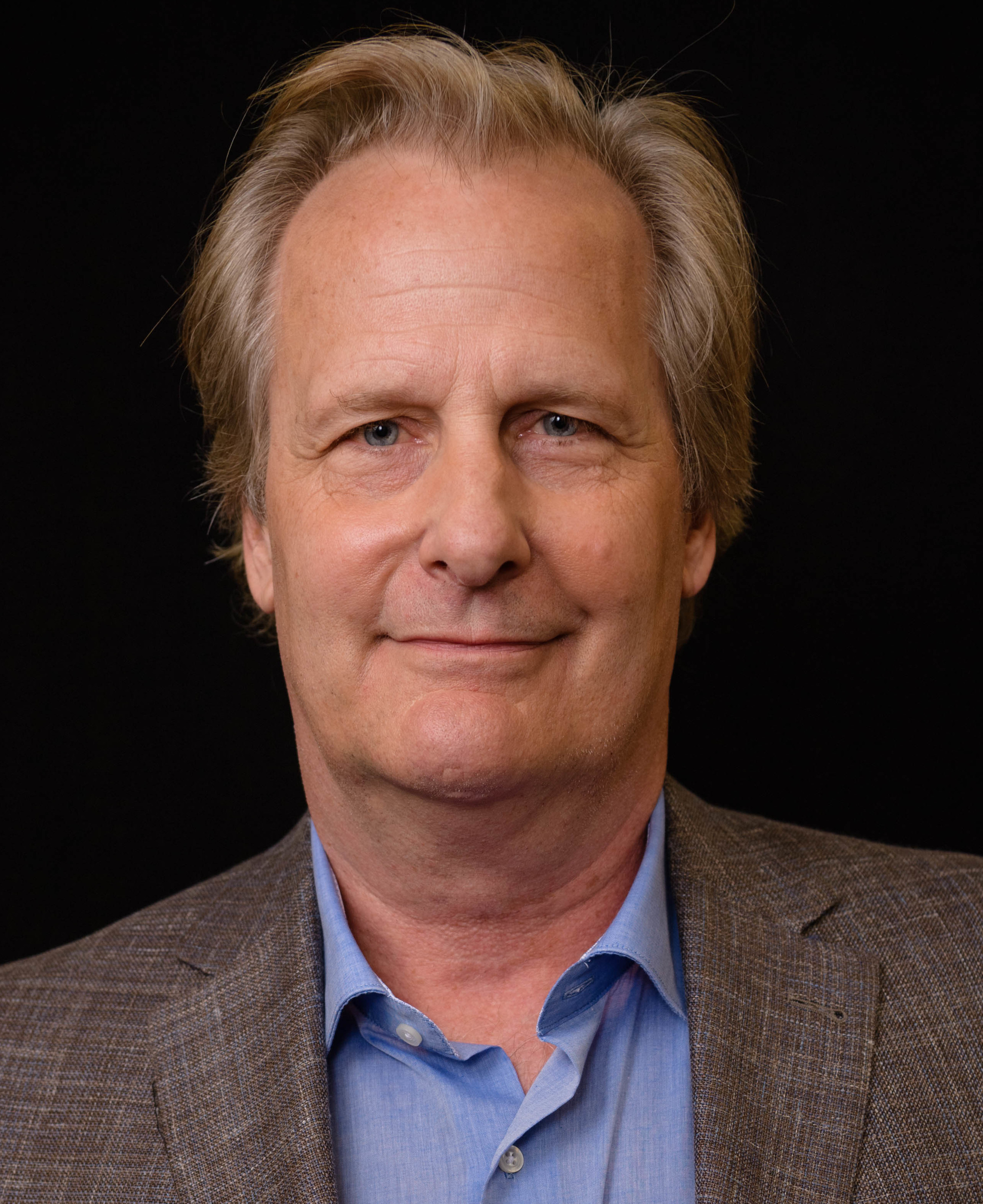
Jeff Daniels received three nominations for his role in The Newsroom, winning in 2013.

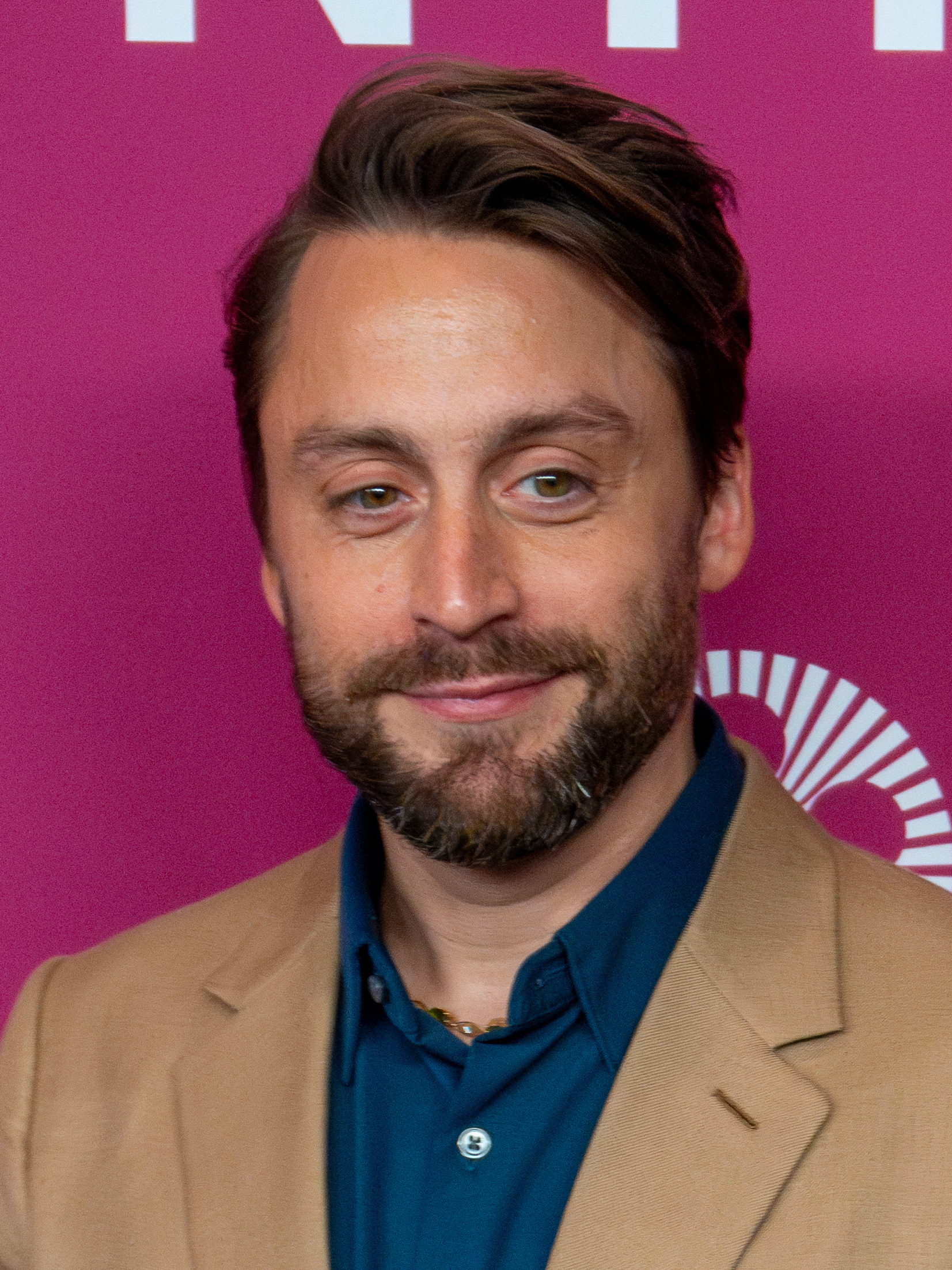
Kieran Culkin won in 2024, for the fourth season of Succession.

Outstanding Lead Actor in a Drama Series
Year	Series	Actor	Role	Result	Ref.
1999	The Sopranos	James Gandolfini	Tony Soprano	Nominated	
2000	The Sopranos	James Gandolfini	Tony Soprano	Won	
2001	The Sopranos	James Gandolfini	Tony Soprano	Won	
2002	Six Feet Under	Michael C. Hall	David Fisher	Nominated	
2002	Six Feet Under	Peter Krause	Nate Fisher	Nominated	
2003	The Sopranos	James Gandolfini	Tony Soprano	Won	
2003	Six Feet Under	Peter Krause	Nate Fisher	Nominated	
2004	The Sopranos	James Gandolfini	Tony Soprano	Nominated	
2005	Deadwood	Ian McShane	Al Swearengen	Nominated	
2006	Six Feet Under	Peter Krause	Nate Fisher	Nominated	
2007	The Sopranos	James Gandolfini	Tony Soprano	Nominated	
2008	In Treatment	Gabriel Byrne	Paul Weston	Nominated	
2009	In Treatment	Gabriel Byrne	Paul Weston	Nominated	
2011	Boardwalk Empire	Steve Buscemi	Nucky Thompson	Nominated	
2012	Boardwalk Empire	Steve Buscemi	Nucky Thompson	Nominated	
2013	The Newsroom	Jeff Daniels	Will McAvoy	Won	
2014	The Newsroom	Jeff Daniels	Will McAvoy	Nominated	
2014	True Detective	Matthew McConaughey	Rust Cohle	Nominated	
2014	True Detective	Woody Harrelson	Martin Hart	Nominated	
2015	The Newsroom	Jeff Daniels	Will McAvoy	Nominated	
2017	Westworld	Anthony Hopkins	Dr. Robert Ford	Nominated	
2018	Westworld	Ed Harris	The Man in Black/William	Nominated	
2018	Westworld	Jeffrey Wright	Bernard Lowe	Nominated	
2019	Game of Thrones	Kit Harington	Jon Snow	Nominated	
2020	Succession	Jeremy Strong	Kendall Roy	Won	
2020	Succession	Brian Cox	Logan Roy	Nominated	
2021	Perry Mason	Matthew Rhys	Perry Mason	Nominated	
2021	Lovecraft Country	Jonathan Majors	Atticus Freeman	Nominated	
2022	Succession	Jeremy Strong	Kendall Roy	Nominated	
2022	Succession	Brian Cox	Logan Roy	Nominated	
2023	The Last of Us	Pedro Pascal	Joel Miller	Nominated	
2023	Succession	Kieran Culkin	Roman Roy	Won	
2023	Succession	Brian Cox	Logan Roy	Nominated	
2023	Succession	Jeremy Strong	Kendall Roy	Nominated	
2025	The Last of Us	Pedro Pascal	Joel Miller	Nominated	
2026	Task	Mark Ruffalo	Tom Brandis	Nominated	

Lead Actress in a Drama Series

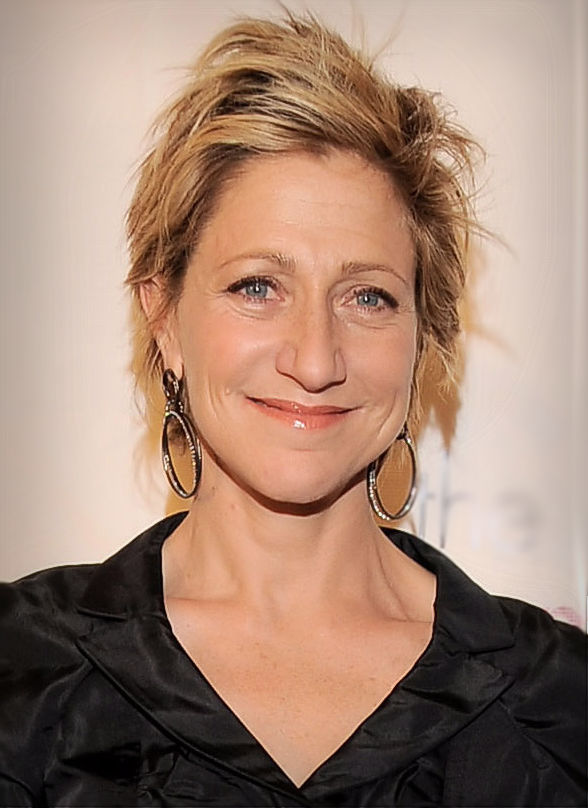
Edie Falco won three times for her role in The Sopranos.

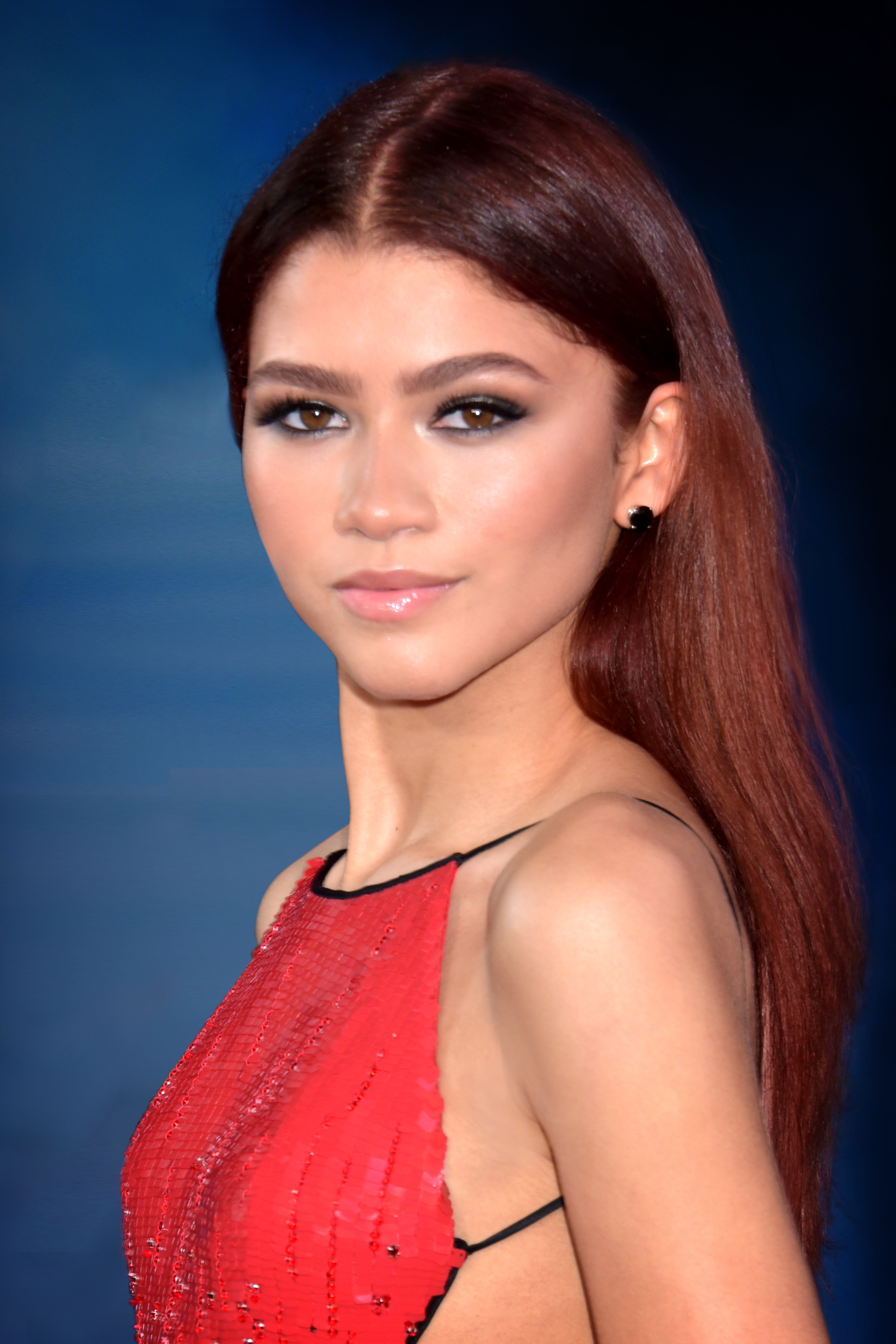
Zendaya became the youngest recipient, winning in 2020 and 2022 for Euphoria.

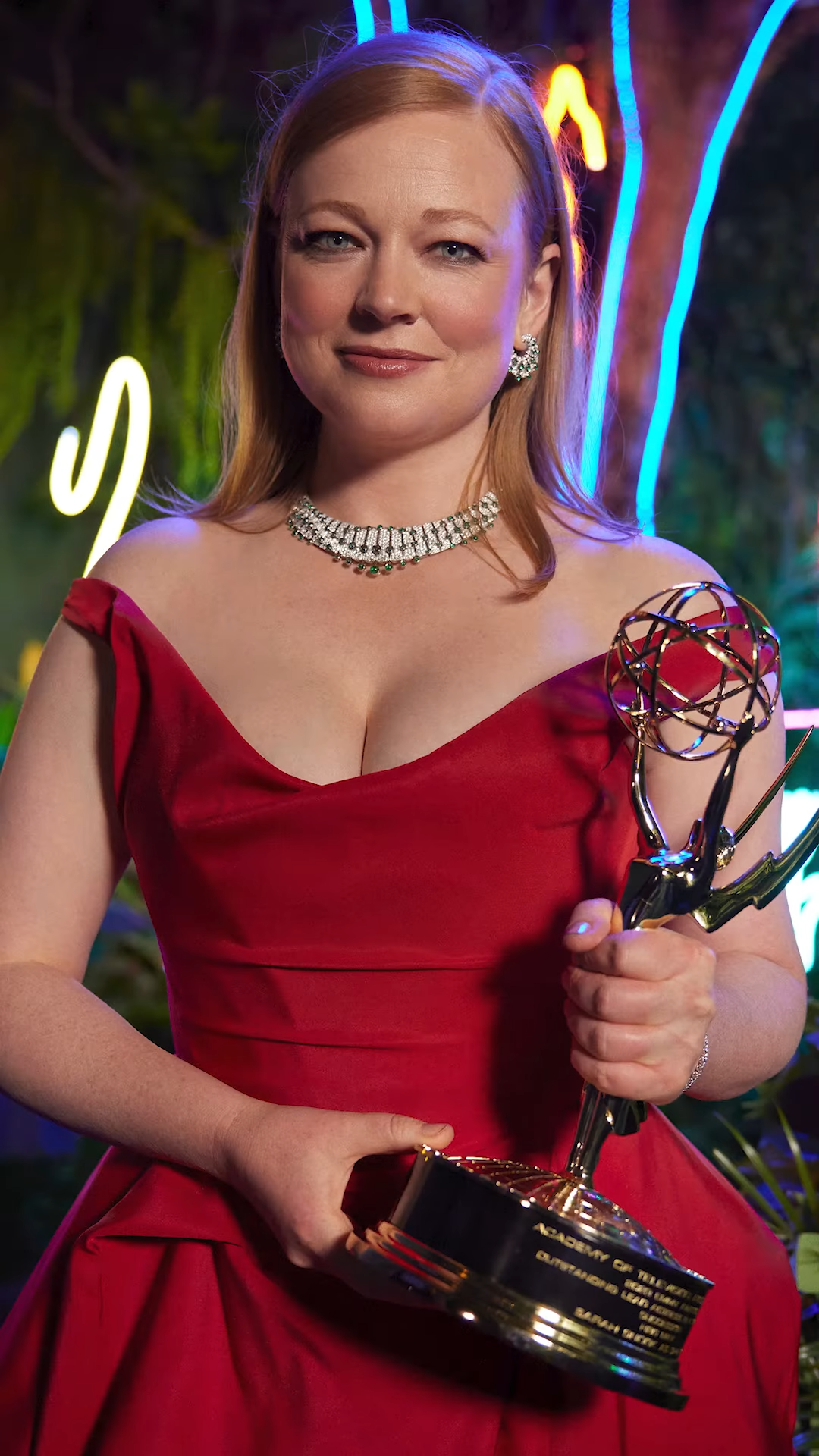
Sarah Snook won in 2024, for the fourth season of Succession.

Outstanding Lead Actress in a Drama Series
Year	Series	Actress	Role	Result	Ref.
1999	The Sopranos	Edie Falco	Carmela Soprano	Won	
1999	The Sopranos	Lorraine Bracco	Jennifer Melfi	Nominated	
2000	The Sopranos	Edie Falco	Carmela Soprano	Nominated	
2000	The Sopranos	Lorraine Bracco	Jennifer Melfi	Nominated	
2001	The Sopranos	Edie Falco	Carmela Soprano	Won	
2001	The Sopranos	Lorraine Bracco	Jennifer Melfi	Nominated	
2002	Six Feet Under	Frances Conroy	Ruth Fisher	Nominated	
2002	Six Feet Under	Rachael Griffiths	Brenda Chenowith	Nominated	
2003	The Sopranos	Edie Falco	Carmela Soprano	Won	
2003	Six Feet Under	Frances Conroy	Ruth Fisher	Nominated	
2004	The Sopranos	Edie Falco	Carmela Soprano	Nominated	
2005	Six Feet Under	Frances Conroy	Ruth Fisher	Nominated	
2006	Six Feet Under	Frances Conroy	Ruth Fisher	Nominated	
2007	The Sopranos	Edie Falco	Carmela Soprano	Nominated	
2017	Westworld	Evan Rachel Wood	Dolores Abernathy	Nominated	
2018	Westworld	Evan Rachel Wood	Dolores Abernathy	Nominated	
2019	Game of Thrones	Emilia Clarke	Daenerys Targaryen	Nominated	
2020	Euphoria	Zendaya	Rue Bennett	Won	
2021	Lovecraft Country	Jurnee Smollett	Leti Lewis	Nominated	
2021	In Treatment	Uzo Aduba	Dr. Brooke Taylor	Nominated	
2022	Euphoria	Zendaya	Rue Bennett	Won	
2023	The Last of Us	Bella Ramsey	Ellie	Nominated	
2023	Succession	Sarah Snook	Shiv Roy	Won	
2024	The Gilded Age	Carrie Coon	Bertha Russell	Nominated	
2025	The Last of Us	Bella Ramsey	Ellie	Nominated	
2026	The Gilded Age	Carrie Coon	Bertha Russell	Nominated	
2026	Euphoria	Zendaya	Rue Bennett	Nominated	

=== Supporting Actor / Actress ===
Supporting Actor in a Drama Series

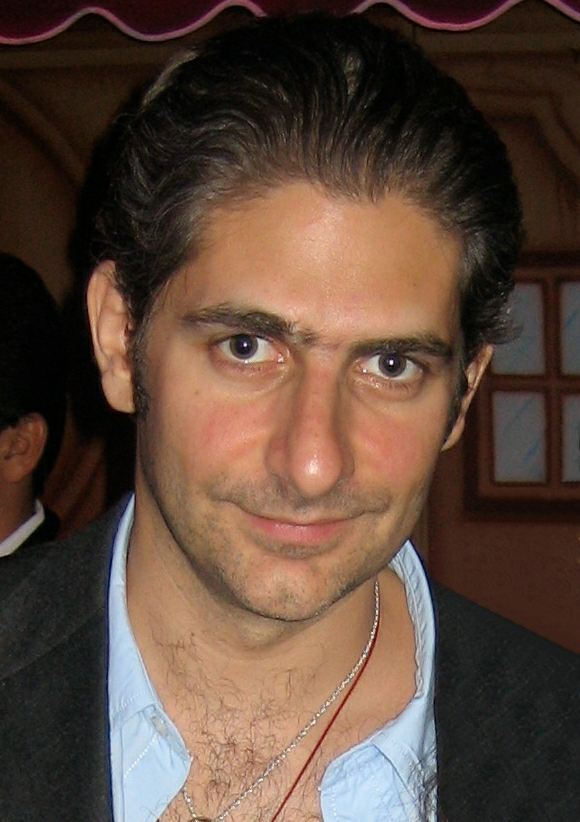
Michael Imperioli was nominated five times for his performance in The Sopranos, winning in 2004.

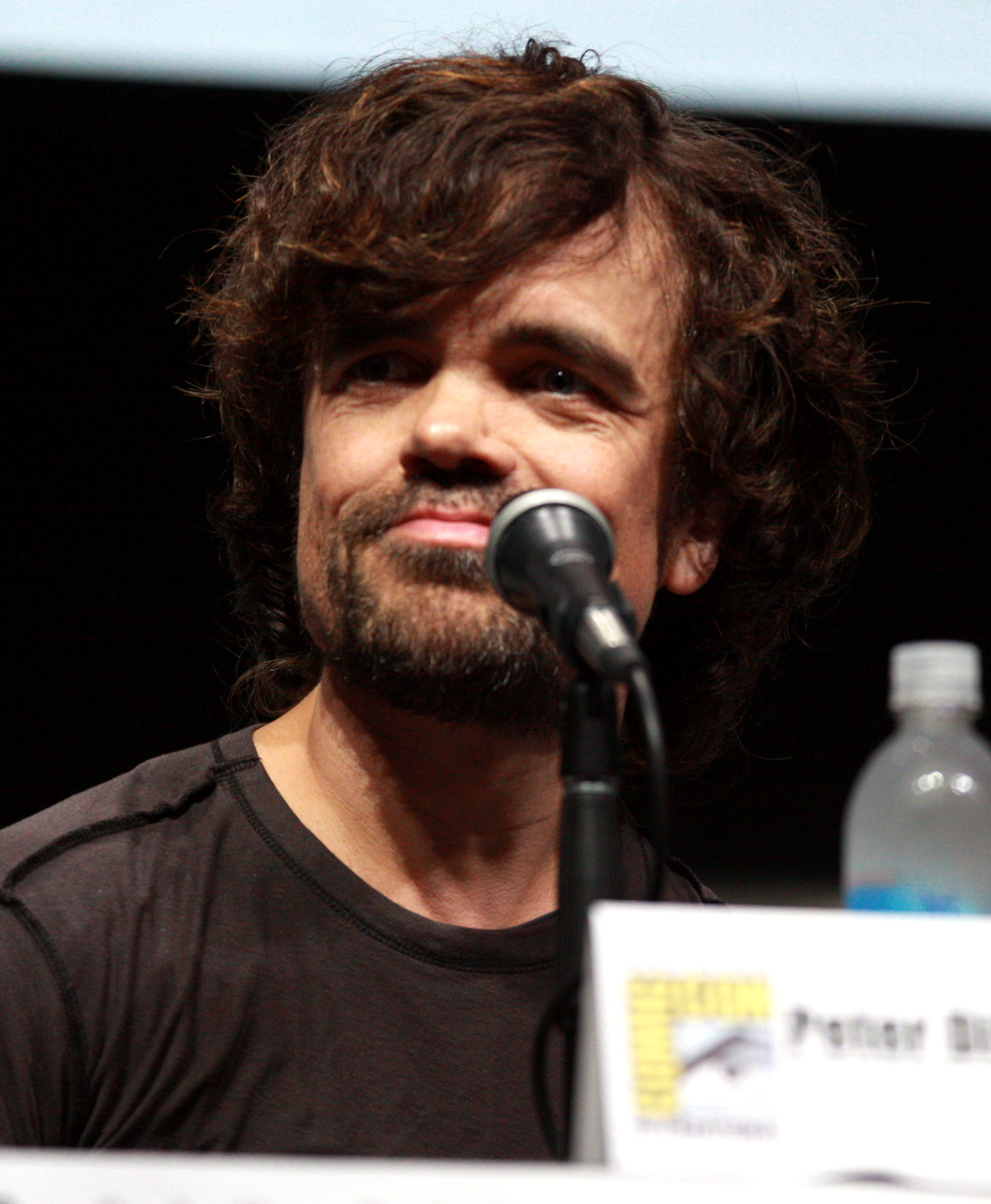
Peter Dinklage won four times out of eight nominations for his role in Game of Thrones.

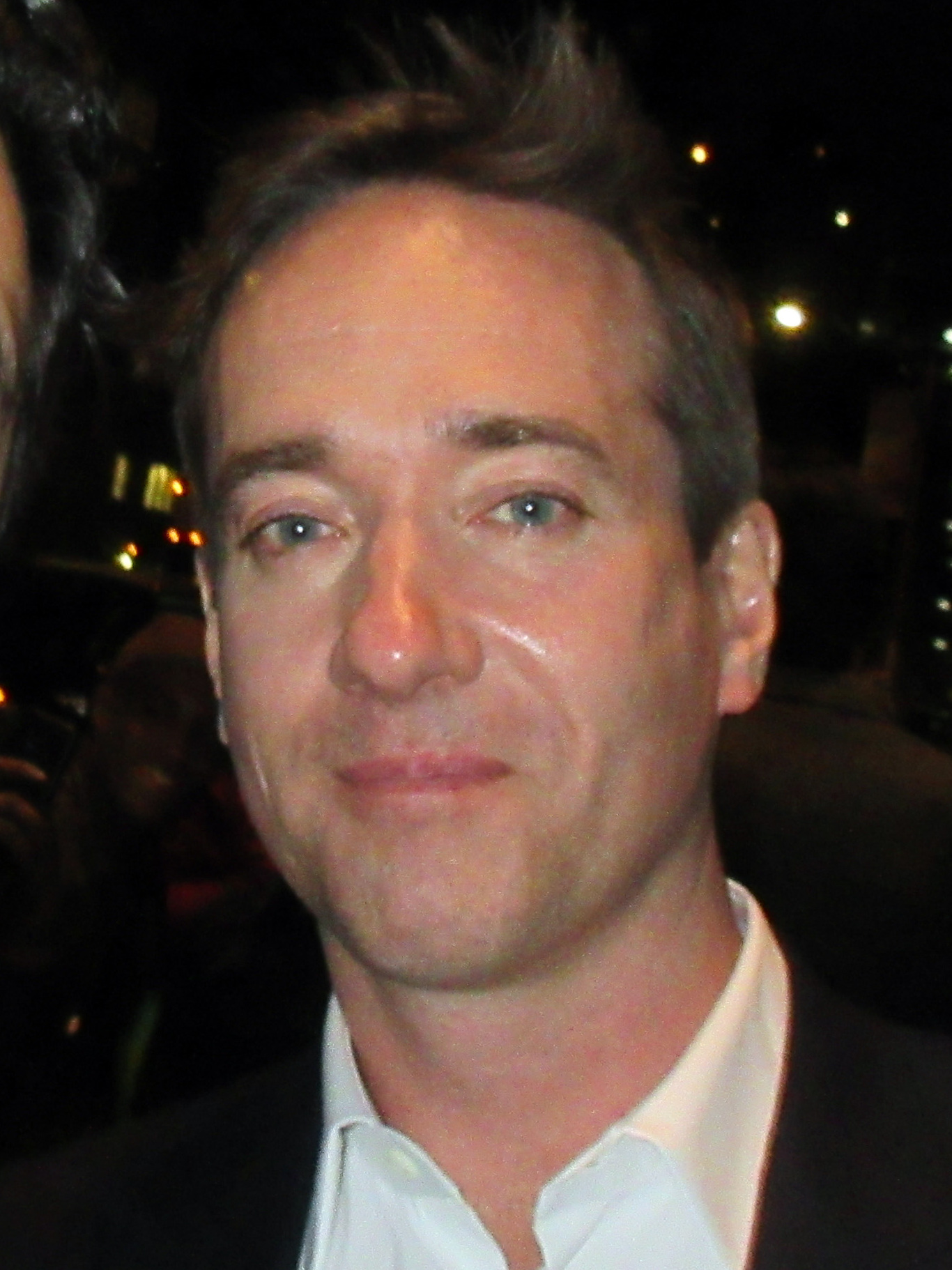
Matthew Macfadyen won twice for Succession.

Outstanding Supporting Actor in a Drama Series
Year	Series	Actor	Role	Result	Ref.
1992	The Ray Bradbury Theater	Richard Kiley	Doug Spaulding	Nominated	
2000	The Sopranos	Dominic Chianese	Junior Soprano	Nominated	
2001	The Sopranos	Dominic Chianese	Junior Soprano	Nominated	
2001	The Sopranos	Michael Imperioli	Christopher Moltisanti	Nominated	
2002	Six Feet Under	Freddy Rodriguez	Fredrico Diaz	Nominated	
2003	The Sopranos	Joe Pantoliano	Ralph Cifaretto	Won	
2003	The Sopranos	Michael Imperioli	Christopher Moltisanti	Nominated	
2004	The Sopranos	Michael Imperioli	Christopher Moltisanti	Won	
2004	The Sopranos	Steve Buscemi	Tony Blundetto	Nominated	
2004	Deadwood	Brad Dourif	Dr. Amos Cochran	Nominated	
2006	The Sopranos	Michael Imperioli	Christopher Moltisanti	Nominated	
2007	The Sopranos	Michael Imperioli	Christopher Moltisanti	Nominated	
2011	Game of Thrones	Peter Dinklage	Tyrion Lannister	Won	
2012	Game of Thrones	Peter Dinklage	Tyrion Lannister	Nominated	
2013	Boardwalk Empire	Bobby Cannavale	Gyp Rosetti	Won	
2013	Game of Thrones	Peter Dinklage	Tyrion Lannister	Nominated	
2014	Game of Thrones	Peter Dinklage	Tyrion Lannister	Nominated	
2015	Game of Thrones	Peter Dinklage	Tyrion Lannister	Won	
2016	Game of Thrones	Peter Dinklage	Tyrion Lannister	Nominated	
2016	Game of Thrones	Kit Harington	Jon Snow	Nominated	
2017	Westworld	Jeffrey Wright	Bernard Lowe	Nominated	
2018	Game of Thrones	Nikolaj Coster-Waldau	Jaime Lannister	Nominated	
2018	Game of Thrones	Peter Dinklage	Tyrion Lannister	Won	
2019	Game of Thrones	Peter Dinklage	Tyrion Lannister	Won	
2019	Game of Thrones	Nikolaj Coster-Waldau	Jaime Lannister	Nominated	
2019	Game of Thrones	Alfie Allen	Theon Greyjoy	Nominated	
2020	Succession	Kieran Culkin	Roman Roy	Nominated	
2020	Succession	Nicholas Braun	Greg Hirsch	Nominated	
2020	Succession	Matthew Macfadyen	Tom Wambsgans	Nominated	
2020	Westworld	Jeffrey Wright	Bernard Lowe	Nominated	
2021	Perry Mason	John Lithgow	E.B. Jonathan	Nominated	
2021	Lovecraft Country	Michael K. Williams	Montrose Freeman	Nominated	
2022	Succession	Kieran Culkin	Roman Roy	Nominated	
2022	Succession	Nicholas Braun	Greg Hirsch	Nominated	
2022	Succession	Matthew Macfadyen	Tom Wambsgans	Won	
2023	The White Lotus	F. Murray Abraham	Berti Di Grasso	Nominated	
2023	The White Lotus	Theo James	Cameron Sullivan	Nominated	
2023	The White Lotus	Michael Imperioli	Dominic Di Grasso	Nominated	
2023	The White Lotus	Will Sharpe	Ethan Spiller	Nominated	
2023	Succession	Matthew Macfadyen	Tom Wambsgans	Won	
2023	Succession	Nicholas Braun	Greg Hirsch	Nominated	
2023	Succession	Alexander Skarsgård	Lukas Matsson	Nominated	
2025	The White Lotus	Walton Goggins	Rick Hatchett	Nominated	
2025	The White Lotus	Jason Isaacs	Timothy Ratliff	Nominated	
2025	The White Lotus	Sam Rockwell	The White Lotus	Nominated	
2026	Task	Tom Pelphrey	Robbie Prendergrast	Won	

Supporting Actress in a Drama Series

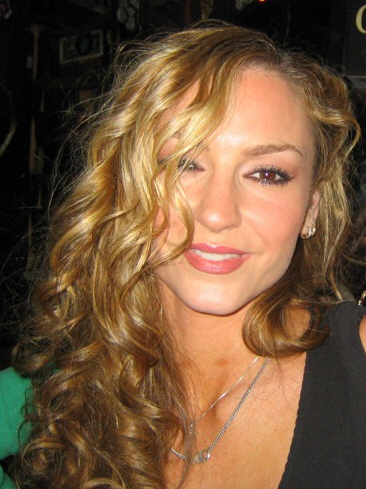
Drea de Matteo won for the fifth season of The Sopranos in 2004.

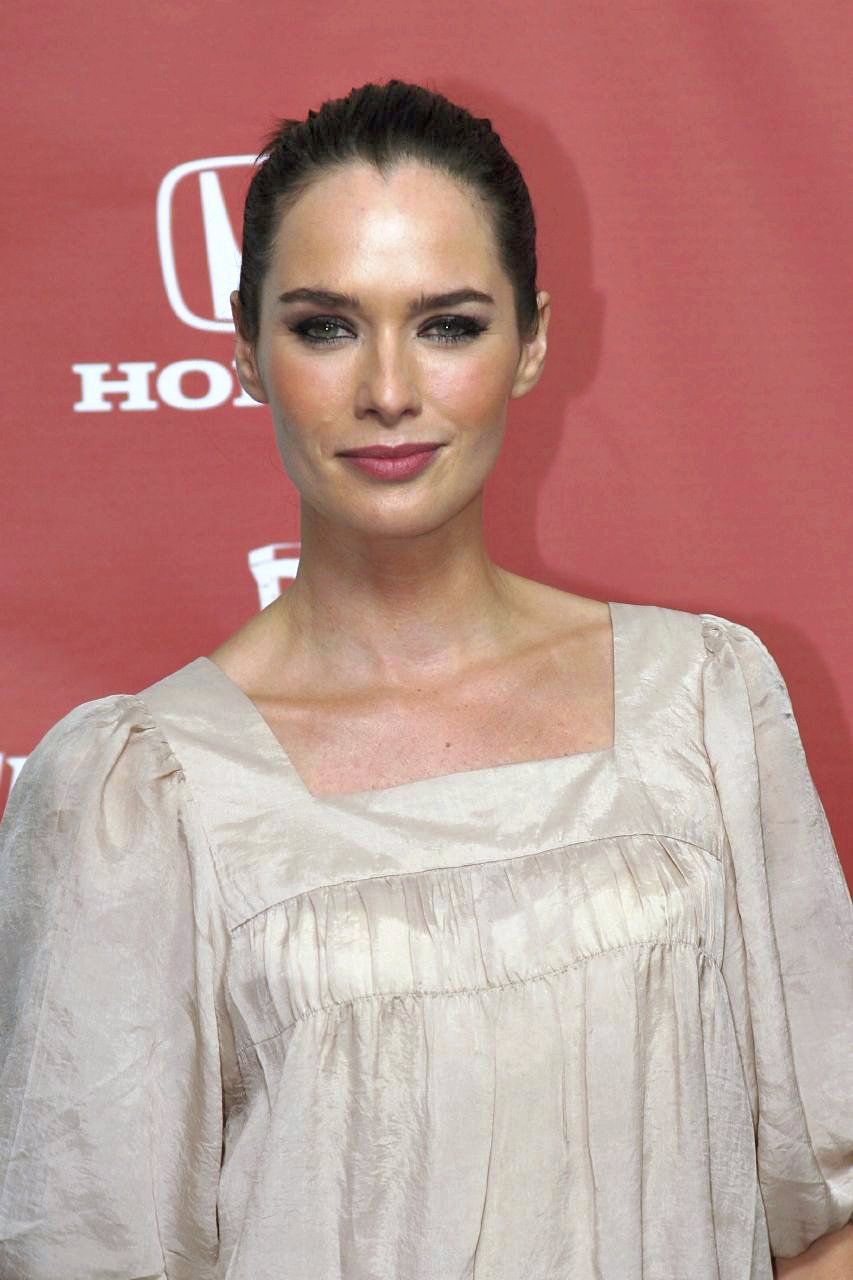
Lena Headey received five nominations as Cersei Lannister.

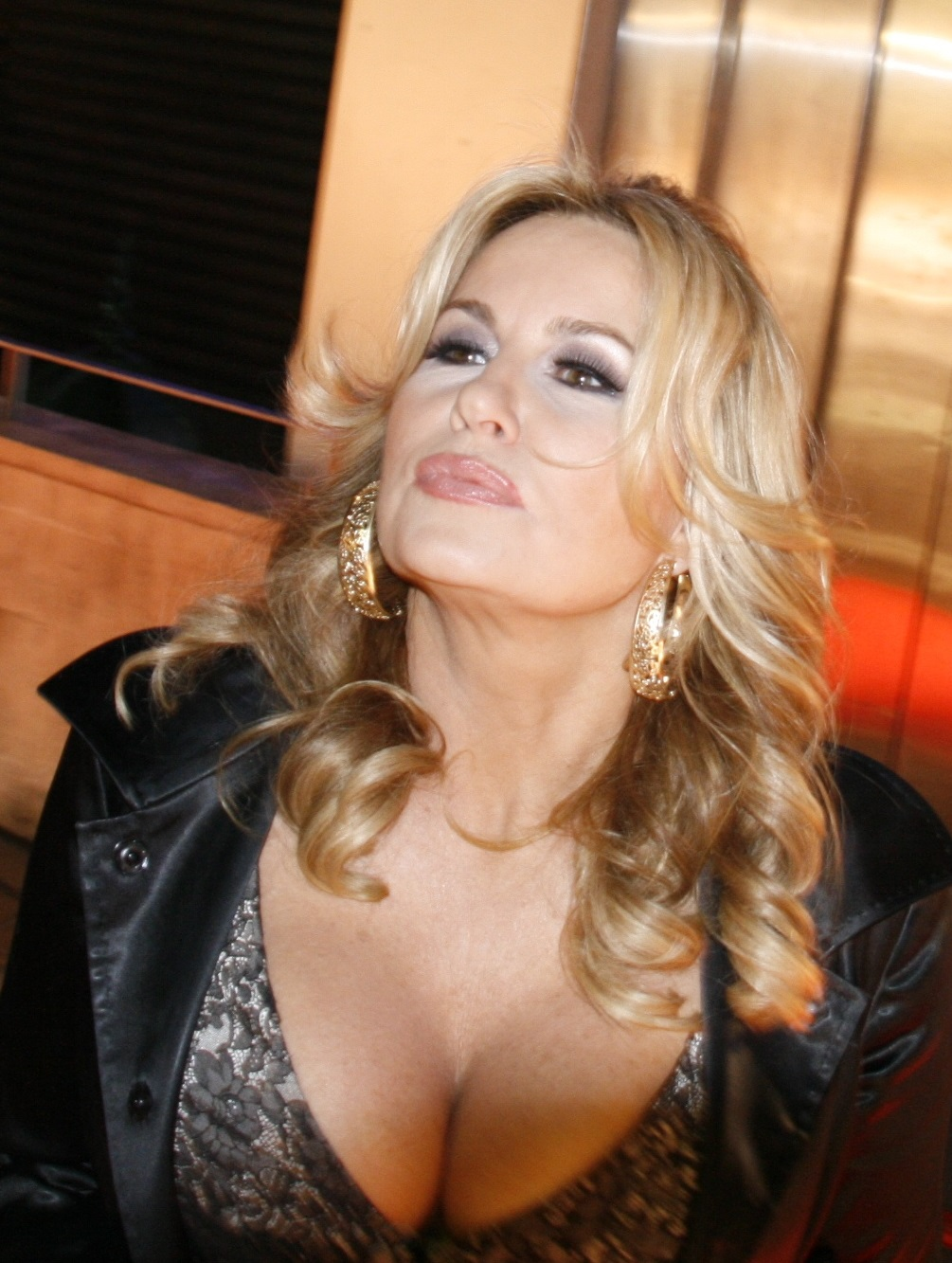
Jennifer Coolidge won for her role in The White Lotus.

Outstanding Supporting Actress in a Drama Series
Year	Series	Actor	Role	Result	Ref.
1999	The Sopranos	Nancy Marchand	Livia Soprano	Nominated	
2000	The Sopranos	Nancy Marchand	Livia Soprano	Nominated	
2001	The Sopranos	Aida Turturro	Janice Soprano	Nominated	
2002	Six Feet Under	Lauren Ambrose	Claire Fisher	Nominated	
2003	Six Feet Under	Lauren Ambrose	Claire Fisher	Nominated	
2003	Six Feet Under	Rachael Griffiths	Brenda Chenowith	Nominated	
2004	The Sopranos	Drea De Matteo	Adriana La Cerva	Won	
2004	Deadwood	Robin Weigert	Calamity Jane	Nominated	
2007	The Sopranos	Aida Turturro	Janice Soprano	Nominated	
2007	The Sopranos	Lorraine Bracco	Jennifer Melfi	Nominated	
2008	In Treatment	Dianne Wiest	Dr. Gina Toll	Won	
2009	In Treatment	Dianne Wiest	Dr. Gina Toll	Nominated	
2009	In Treatment	Hope Davis	Mia Nesky	Nominated	
2011	Boardwalk Empire	Kelly Macdonald	Margaret Thompson	Nominated	
2013	Game of Thrones	Emilia Clarke	Daenerys Targaryen	Nominated	
2014	Game of Thrones	Lena Headey	Cersei Lannister	Nominated	
2015	Game of Thrones	Lena Headey	Cersei Lannister	Nominated	
2015	Game of Thrones	Emilia Clarke	Daenerys Targaryen	Nominated	
2016	Game of Thrones	Emilia Clarke	Daenerys Targaryen	Nominated	
2016	Game of Thrones	Lena Headey	Cersei Lannister	Nominated	
2016	Game of Thrones	Maisie Williams	Arya Stark	Nominated	
2017	Westworld	Thandiwe Newton	Maeve Millay	Nominated	
2018	Game of Thrones	Lena Headey	Cersei Lannister	Nominated	
2018	Westworld	Thandiwe Newton	Maeve Willay	Won	
2019	Game of Thrones	Sophie Turner	Sansa Stark	Nominated	
2019	Game of Thrones	Lena Headey	Cersei Lannister	Nominated	
2019	Game of Thrones	Maisie Williams	Arya Stark	Nominated	
2019	Game of Thrones	Gwendoline Christie	Brienne of Tarth	Nominated	
2020	Big Little Lies	Laura Dern	Renata Klein	Nominated	
2020	Big Little Lies	Meryl Streep	Mary Louis Wright	Nominated	
2020	Succession	Sarah Snook	Shiv Roy	Nominated	
2020	Westworld	Thandiwe Newton	Maeve Willay	Nominated	
2021	Lovecraft Country	Aunjanue Ellis-Taylor	Hippolyta Freeman	Nominated	
2022	Succession	Sarah Snook	Shiv Roy	Nominated	
2022	Succession	J. Smith-Cameron	Gerri Kellman	Nominated	
2022	Euphoria	Sydney Sweeney	Cassie Howard	Nominated	
2023	The White Lotus	Jennifer Coolidge	Tanya McQuoid-Hunt	Won	
2023	The White Lotus	Meghann Fahy	Daphne Sullivan	Nominated	
2023	The White Lotus	Aubrey Plaza	Harper Spiller	Nominated	
2023	The White Lotus	Sabrina Impacciatore	Valentina	Nominated	
2023	The White Lotus	Simona Tabasco	Lucia Greco	Nominated	
2023	Succession	J. Smith-Cameron	Gerri Kellman	Nominated	
2024	The Gilded Age	Christine Baranski	Angnes Van Rhijn	Nominated	
2025	The White Lotus	Carrie Coon	Laurie Duffy	Nominated	
2025	The White Lotus	Parker Posey	Victoria Ratliff	Nominated	
2025	The White Lotus	Natasha Rothwell	Belinda Lindsey	Nominated	
2025	The White Lotus	Aimee Lou Wood	Chelsea	Nominated	

=== Guest Actor / Actress ===
Guest Actor in a Drama Series

Outstanding Guest Actor in a Drama Series
Year	Series	Actor	Role	Result	Ref.
1990	Tales from the Crypt	William Hickey	Carlton Webber	Nominated	
1992	Tales from the Crypt	Kirk Douglas	General Calthrob	Nominated	
1994	Tales from the Crypt	Tim Curry	Mother/Father	Nominated	
1999	The Sopranos	John Heard	Det. Vin Makazian	Nominated	
2003	Six Feet Undet	James Cromwell	George Sibley	Nominated	
2007	The Sopranos	Tim Daly	J.T. Dolan	Nominated	
2008	In Treatment	Glynn Turman	Alex Prince Jr.	Won	
2011	Big Love	Bruce Dern	Frank Harlow	Nominated	
2016	Game of Thrones	Max von Sydow	The Three-Eyed Raven	Nominated	
2017	Westworld	Jimmi Simpson	William	Nominated	
2020	Succession	James Cromwell	Ewan Roy	Nominated	
2020	The Outsider	Jason Bateman	Terry Maitland	Nominated	
2021	Lovecraft Country	Courtney B. Vance	George Freeman	Won	
2022	Succession	James Cromwell	Ewan Roy	Nominated	
2022	Succession	Adrien Brody	Josh Aaronson	Nominated	
2022	Succession	Arian Moayed	Stewy Hosseini	Nominated	
2022	Succession	Alexander Skarsgård	Lukas Matsson	Nominated	
2022	Euphoria	Colman Domingo	Ali Muhammad	Won	
2023	The Last of Us	Murray Bartlett	Frank	Nominated	
2023	The Last of Us	Lamar Johnson	Henry	Nominated	
2023	The Last of Us	Keivonn Woodard	Sam	Nominated	
2023	The Last of Us	Nick Offerman	Bill	Won	
2023	Succession	James Cromwell	Ewan Roy	Nominated	
2023	Succession	Arian Moayed	Stewy Hosseini	Nominated	
2024	Winning Time: The Rise of the Lakers Dynasty	Tracy Letts	Jack McKinney	Nominated	
2025	The White Lotus	Scott Glenn	Jim Hollinger	Nominated	
2025	The Last of Us	Joe Pantoliano	Eugene	Nominated	
2025	The Last of Us	Jeffrey Wright	Issac	Nominated	
2026	Euphoria	Colman Domingo	Ali Muhammad	Nominated	

Guest Actress in a Drama Series

Outstanding Guest Actress in a Drama Series
Year	Series	Actor	Role	Result	Ref.
2001	The Sopranos	Annabella Sciorra	Gloria Trillo	Nominated	
2002	Six Feet Under	Patricia Clarkson	Sarah O'Connor	Won	
2002	Six Feet Under	Illeana Douglas	Angela	Nominated	
2002	Six Feet Under	Lili Taylor	Lisa Kimmel Fisher	Nominated	
2003	Six Feet Under	Kathy Bates	Bettina	Nominated	
2006	Six Feet Under	Patricia Clarkson	Sarah O'Connor	Won	
2006	Six Feet Under	Joanna Cassidy	Margaret Chenowith	Nominated	
2008	Big Love	Ellen Burstyn	Nancy Davis Dutton	Nominated	
2009	The No. 1 Ladies' Detective Agency	CCH Pounder	Andrea Curtin	Nominated	
2010	Big Love	Mary Kay Place	Adaleen Grant	Nominated	
2010	Big Love	Sissy Spacek	Marilyn Densham	Nominated	
2011	True Blood	Alfre Woodard	Ruby Jean Reynolds	Nominated	
2013	The Newsroom	Jane Fonda	Leona Lansing	Nominated	
2013	Game of Thrones	Diana Rigg	Olenna Tyrell	Nominated	
2014	The Newsroom	Jane Fonda	Leona Lansing	Nominated	
2014	Game of Thrones	Diana Rigg	Olenna Tyrell	Nominated	
2015	Game of Thrones	Diana Rigg	Olenna Tyrell	Nominated	
2017	The Leftovers	Ann Dowd	Patti Levin	Nominated	
2018	Game of Thrones	Diana Rigg	Olenna Tyrell	Nominated	
2019	Game of Thrones	Carice van Houten	Melisandre	Nominated	
2020	Succession	Cherry Jones	Nan Pierce	Won	
2020	Succession	Harriet Walter	Caroline Collingwood	Nominated	
2022	Succession	Hope Davis	Sandi Furness	Nominated	
2022	Succession	Harriet Walter	Caroline Collingwood	Nominated	
2022	Succession	Sanaa Lathan	Lisa Arthur	Nominated	
2022	Euphoria	Martha Kelly	Laurie	Nominated	
2023	The Last of Us	Storm Reid	Riley Abel	Won	
2023	The Last of Us	Melanie Lynskey	Kathleen Coghlan	Nominated	
2023	The Last of Us	Anna Torv	Tess	Nominated	
2023	Succession	Cherry Jones	Nan Pierce	Nominated	
2023	Succession	Harriet Walter	Caroline Collingwood	Nominated	
2023	Succession	Hiam Abbass	Marcia Roy	Nominated	
2025	The Last of Us	Catherine O'Hara	Gail	Nominated	
2025	The Last of Us	Kaitlyn Dever	Abby	Nominated	
2026	The Gilded Age	Merritt Wever	Monica O'Brien	Nominated	

=== Directing and Writing ===
Outstanding Directing for a Drama Series

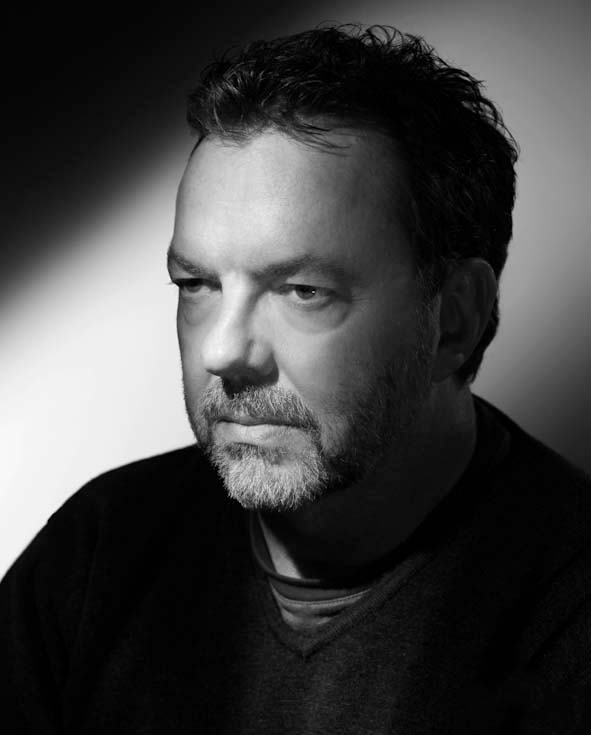
Alan Ball won for directing the pilot episode of Six Feet Under in 2002.

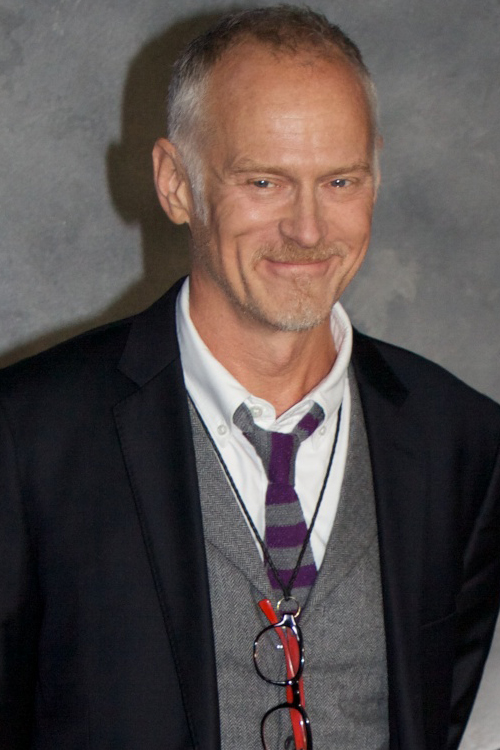
Alan Taylor won in 2007 for his directorial work in The Sopranos.

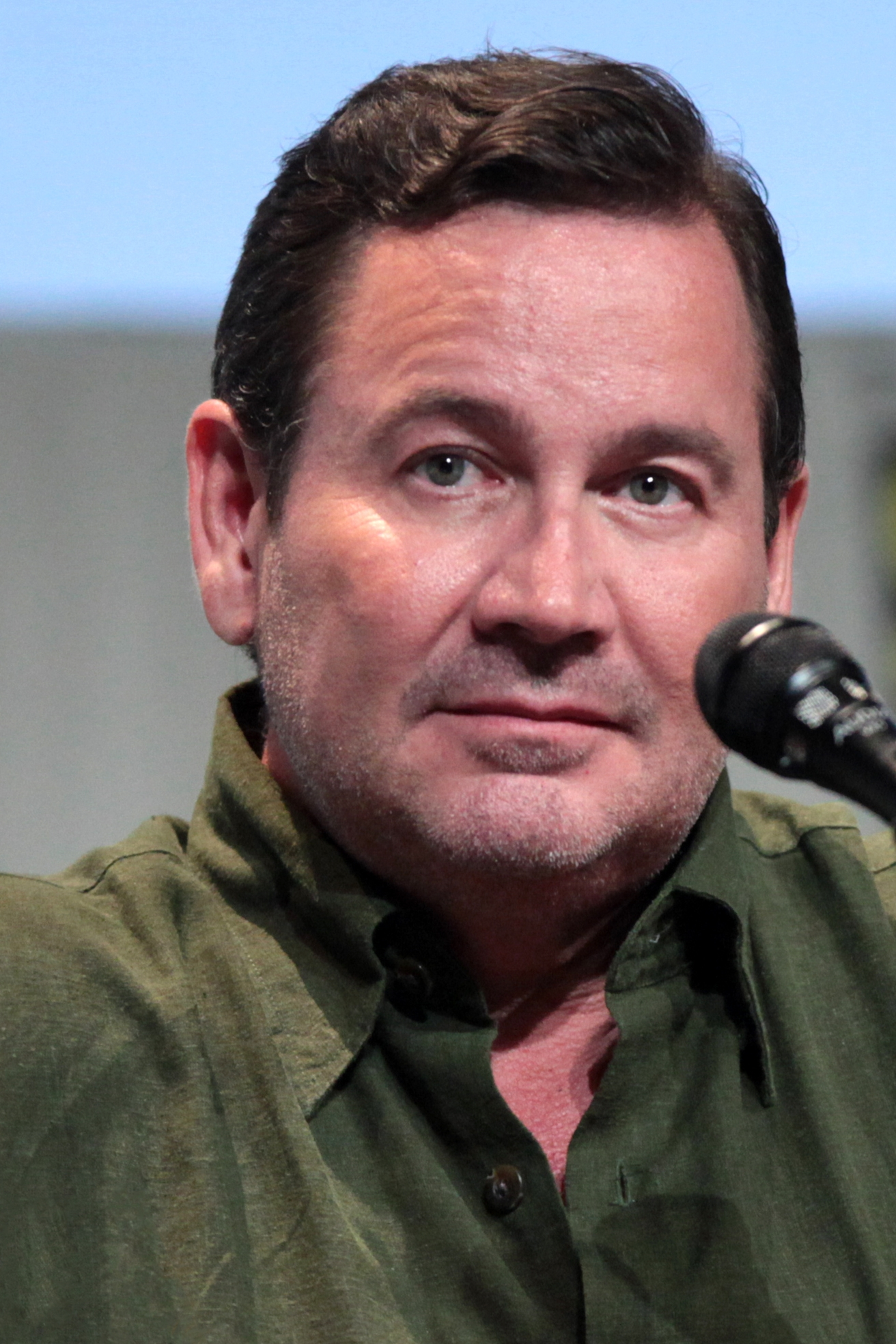
David Nutter received three nominations for The Sopranos and Game of Thrones, winning in 2015.

Outstanding Directing for a Drama Series
Year	Series	Season	Episode	Director	Result	Ref.
1999	The Sopranos	1	The Sopranos	David Chase	Nominated	
2000	The Sopranos	2	Funhouse	John Patterson	Nominated	
2000	The Sopranos	2	The Knight in White Satin Armor	Allen Coulter	Nominated	
2001	The Sopranos	3	Amour Fou	Tim Van Patten	Nominated	
2001	The Sopranos	3	Pine Barrens	Steve Buscemi	Nominated	
2001	The Sopranos	3	University	Allen Coulter	Nominated	
2002	Six Feet Under	1	Pilot	Alan Ball	Won	
2003	The Sopranos	4	Whitecaps	Alan Poul	Nominated	
2003	The Sopranos	4	Whoever Did This	Tim Van Patten	Nominated	
2003	Six Feet Under	3	Nobody Sleeps	Alan Ball	Nominated	
2004	The Sopranos	5	Irregular Around the Margins	Alan Coulter	Nominated	
2004	The Sopranos	5	Long Term Parking	Tim Van Patten	Nominated	
2004	Deadwood	1	Deadwood	Gregg Fienberg	Nominated	
2005	Deadwood	2	Complications	Gregg Fienberg	Nominated	
2006	Six Feet Under	5	Everyone's Waiting	Alan Ball	Nominated	
2006	Big Love	1	Pilot	Rodrigo Garcia	Nominated	
2006	The Sopranos	6	Join the Club	David Nutter	Nominated	
2006	The Sopranos	6	Members Only	Tim Van Patten	Nominated	
2007	The Sopranos	6	Kennedy and Heidi	Alan Taylor	Won	
2010	Treme	1	Do You Know What It Means	Agnieszka Holland	Nominated	
2011	Boardwalk Empire	1	Boardwalk Empire	Martin Scorsese	Won	
2011	Boardwalk Empire	1	Anastasia	Jeremy Podeswa	Nominated	
2011	Game of Thrones	1	Winter Is Coming	Tim Van Patten	Nominated	
2012	Boardwalk Empire	2	To the Lost	Tim Van Patten	Won	
2013	Boardwalk Empire	3	Margate Sands	Tim Van Patten	Nominated	
2014	Boardwalk Empire	4	Farewell Daddy Blues	Tim Van Patten	Nominated	
2014	True Detective	1	Who Goes There	Cary Joji Fukunaga	Won	
2014	Game of Thrones	4	The Watchers on the Wall	Neil Marshall	Nominated	
2015	Boardwalk Empire	5	Eldrado	Tim Van Patten	Nominated	
2015	Game of Thrones	5	Mother’s Mercy	David Nutter	Won	
2015	Game of Thrones	5	Unbowed, Unbent, Unbroken	Jeremy Podeswa	Nominated	
2016	Game of Thrones	6	Battle of the Bastards	Miguel Sapochnik	Won	
2016	Game of Thrones	6	The Door	Jack Bender	Nominated	
2017	Westworld	1	The Bicameral Mind	Jonathan Nolan	Nominated	
2018	Game of Thrones	7	Beyond the Wall	Alan Taylor	Nominated	
2018	Game of Thrones	7	The Dragon and the Wolf	Jeremy Podeswa	Nominated	
2019	Succession	1	Celebration	Adam McKay	Nominated	
2019	Game of Thrones	8	The Iron Throne	David Benioff and D. B. Weiss	Nominated	
2019	Game of Thrones	8	The Last of the Starks	David Nutter	Nominated	
2019	Game of Thrones	8	The Long Night	Miguel Sapochnik	Nominated	
2020	Succession	2	Hunting	Andrij Parekh	Won	
2020	Succession	2	This Is Not for Tears	Mark Mylod	Nominated	
2022	Succession	3	All the Bells Say	Mark Mylod	Nominated	
2022	Succession	3	The Disruption	Cathy Yan	Nominated	
2022	Succession	3	Too Much Birthday	Lorene Scafaria	Nominated	
2023	The White Lotus	2	Arrivederci	Mike White	Nominated	
2023	The Last of Us	1	Long, Long Time	Peter Hoar	Nominated	
2023	Succession	4	Connor's Wedding	Mark Mylod	Won	
2023	Succession	4	America Decides	Andrij Parekh	Nominated	
2023	Succession	4	Living+	Lorene Scafaria	Nominated	
2024	Winning Time: The Rise of the Lakers Dynasty	2	BEAT L.A.	Salli Richardson-Whitfield	Nominated	
2025	The White Lotus	3	Amor Fati	Mike White	Nominated	
2026	The Gilded Age	3	My Mind Is Made Up	Salli Richardson-Whitfield	Nominated	
2026	Task	1	Out beyond ideas of wrongdoing and rightdoing, there is a river.	Salli Richardson-Whitfield	Nominated	

Outstanding Writing for a Drama Series

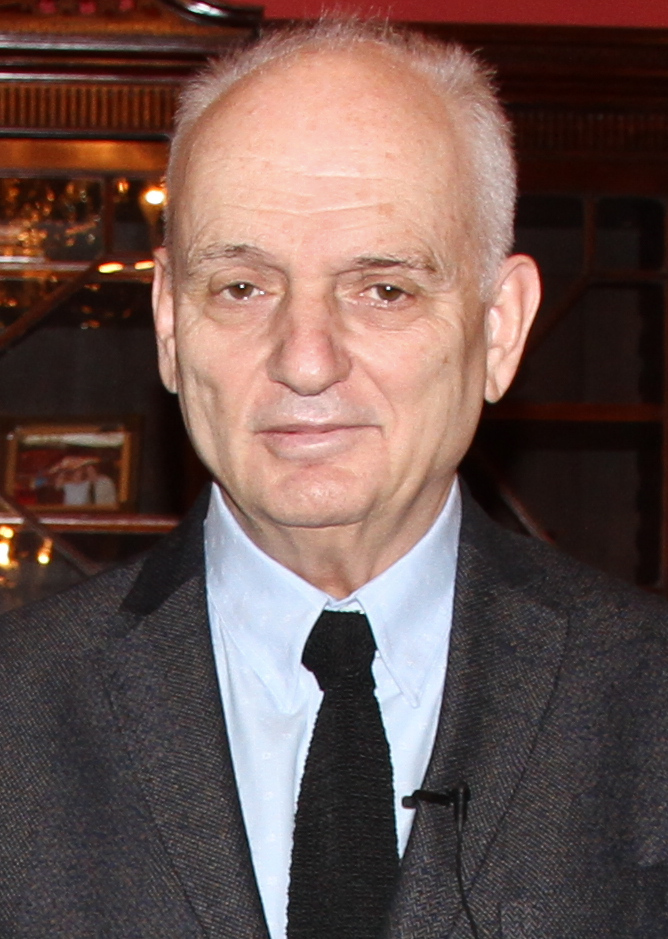
David Chase was nominated six times for The Sopranos, winning in 2007.

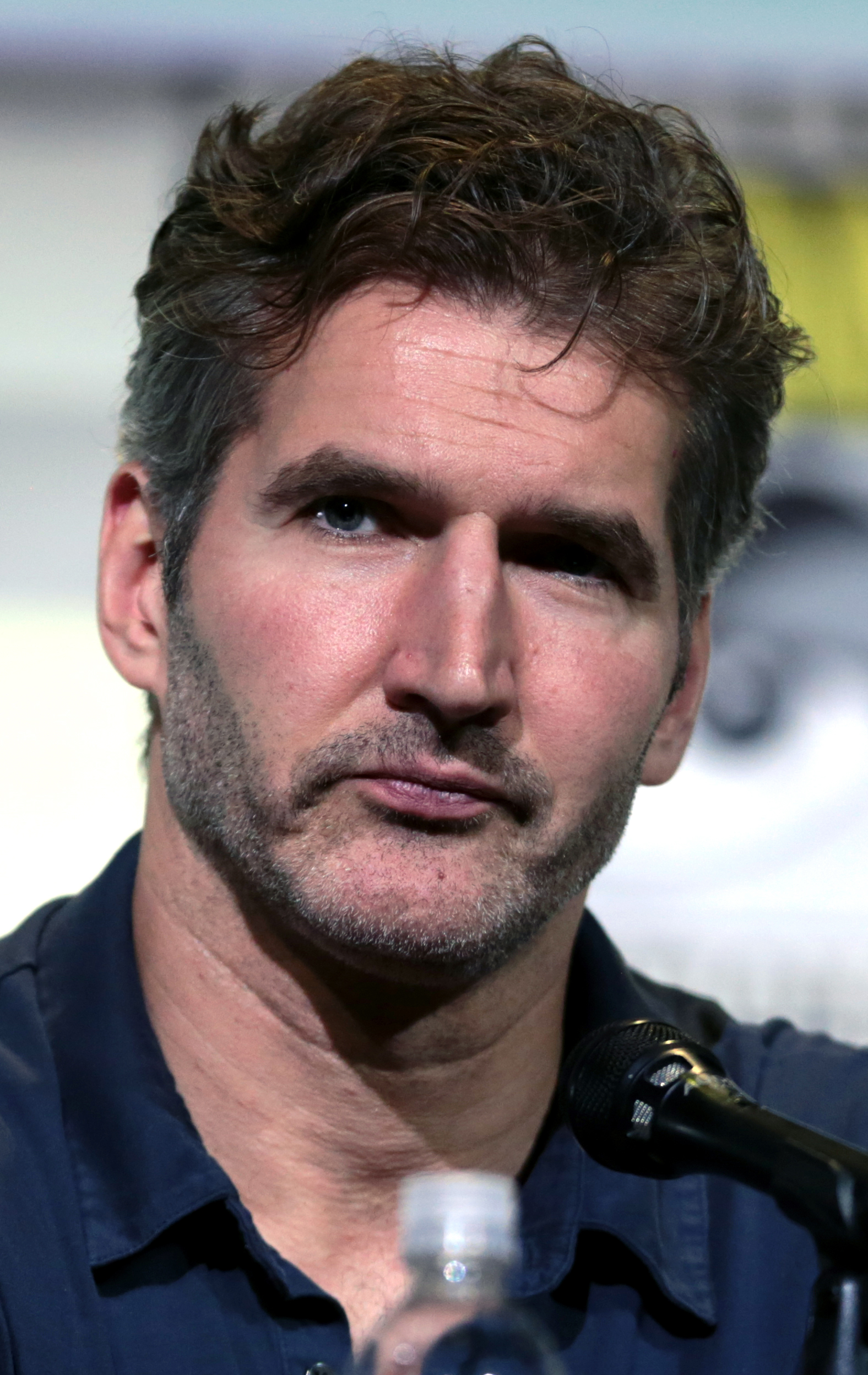
David Benioff and D. B. Weiss won in 2015 and 2016 for Game of Thrones.

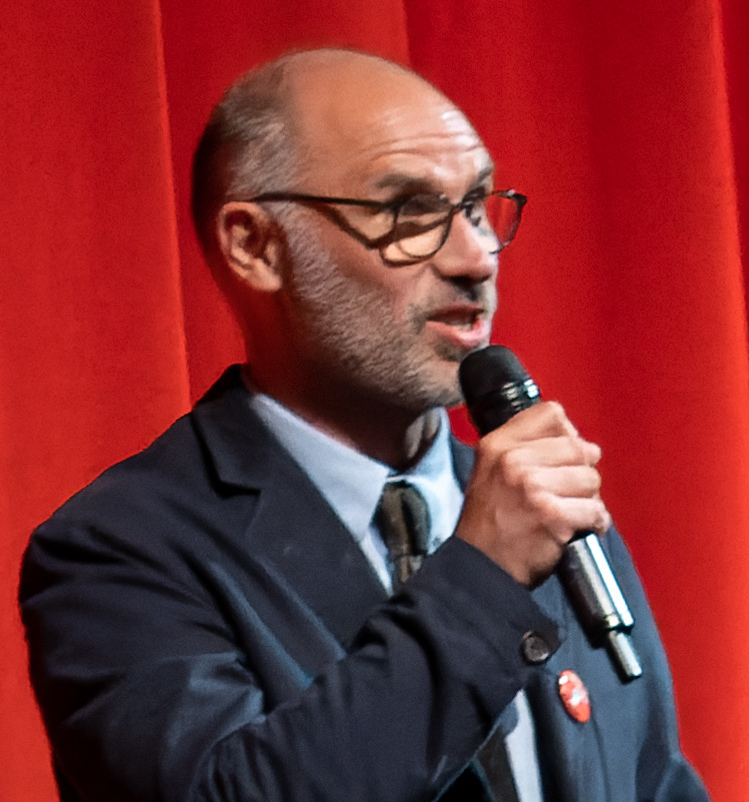
Jesse Armstrong won four times as a writer for Succession.

Outstanding Writing for a Drama Series
Year	Series	Season	Episode	Director	Result	Ref.
1999	The Sopranos	1	The Sopranos	David Chase	Nominated	
1999	The Sopranos	1	Nobody Knows Anything	Frank Renzulli	Nominated	
1999	The Sopranos	1	College	James Manos Jr. and David Chase	Won	
1999	The Sopranos	1	Isabella	Robin Green and Mitchell Burgess	Nominated	
2000	The Sopranos	2	The Knight in White Satin Armor	Robin Green and Mitchell Burgess	Nominated	
2000	The Sopranos	2	Funhouse	David Chase and Todd A. Kessler	Nominated	
2001	The Sopranos	3	Amour Fou	David Chase and Frank Renzulli	Nominated	
2001	The Sopranos	3	Pine Barrens	Tim Van Patten and Terence Winter	Nominated	
2001	The Sopranos	3	Second Opinion	Lawrence Konner	Nominated	
2001	The Sopranos	3	Employee of the Month	Robin Green and Mitchell Burgess	Won	
2003	The Sopranos	4	Whitecaps	Robin Green and Mitchell Burgess	Won	
2003	The Sopranos	4	Whoever Did This	Robin Green and Mitchell Burgess	Nominated	
2003	The Sopranos	4	Eloise	Terence Winter	Nominated	
2003	Six Feet Under	3	Twilight	Craig Wright	Nominated	
2004	The Sopranos	5	Irregular Around the Margins	Robin Green and Mitchell Burgess	Nominated	
2004	The Sopranos	5	Long Term Parking	Terence Winter	Won	
2004	The Sopranos	5	Where's Johnny?	Michael Caleo	Nominated	
2004	The Sopranos	5	Unidentified Black Males	Matthew Weiner and Terence Winter	Nominated	
2004	Deadwood	1	Deadwood	David Milch	Nominated	
2005	The Wire	3	Middle Ground	David Simon and George Pelecanos	Nominated	
2006	Six Feet Under	5	Everyone's Waiting	Alan Ball	Nominated	
2006	The Sopranos	6	Members Only	Terence Winter	Won	
2007	The Sopranos	6	The Second Coming	Terence Winter	Nominated	
2007	The Sopranos	6	Kennedy and Heidi	Matthew Weiner and David Chase	Nominated	
2007	The Sopranos	6	Made in America	David Chase	Won	
2008	The Wire	5	-30–	David Simon and Ed Burns	Nominated	
2011	Game of Thrones	1	Baelor	David Benioff and D. B. Weiss	Nominated	
2013	Game of Thrones	3	The Rains of Castamere	David Benioff and D. B. Weiss	Nominated	
2014	True Detective	1	The Secret Fate of All Life	Nic Pizzolatto	Nominated	
2014	Game of Thrones	4	The Watchers on the Wall	David Benioff and D. B. Weiss	Nominated	
2015	Game of Thrones	5	Mother’s Mercy	David Benioff and D. B. Weiss	Won	
2016	Game of Thrones	6	Battle of the Bastards	David Benioff and D. B. Weiss	Won	
2017	Westworld	1	The Bicameral Mind	Lisa Joy and Jonathan Nolan	Nominated	
2018	Game of Thrones	7	The Dragon and the Wolf	David Benioff and D. B. Weiss	Nominated	
2019	Succession	1	Nobody Is Ever Missing	Jesse Armstrong	Won	
2019	Game of Thrones	8	The Iron Throne	David Benioff and D. B. Weiss	Nominated	
2020	Succession	2	This Is Not for Tears	Jesse Armstrong	Won	
2021	Lovecraft Country	1	Sundown	Misha Green	Nominated	
2022	Succession	3	All the Bells Say	Jesse Armstrong	Won	
2023	The White Lotus	2	Arrivederci	Mike White	Nominated	
2023	The Last of Us	1	Long, Long Time	Craig Mazin	Nominated	
2023	Succession	4	Connor's Wedding	Jesse Armstrong	Won	
2025	The White Lotus	3	Full-Moon Party	Mike White	Nominated	
2026	Task	1	A Still Small Voice	Brad Ingelsby	Nominated	

== Comedy series ==
In 1993, The Larry Sanders Show became the first cable TV series to receive a nomination for the Primetime Emmy Award for Outstanding Comedy Series. It was nominated every year it was eligible and secured its final nomination in 1998. Sex and the City followed, earning nominations for its first season in 1999 and continuing through to its final season in 2004, winning the award in 2001.

Curb Your Enthusiasm received its first nomination in 2002 and continued to be a regular nominee over the years, with nominations spanning multiple seasons. Entourage was nominated for the award for its second season in 2006 and continued receiving nominations through 2009.

Girls made its debut in the category in 2013 and received nominations for its first two seasons. Veep started its streak in 2012 and won the award three times consecutively from 2015 to 2017, marking a significant achievement in the comedy genre.

Silicon Valley was first nominated in 2014 and continued to receive nominations for five consecutive seasons until 2018. Barry was nominated for its first season in 2018 and continued receiving nominations for subsequent seasons. Insecure received its first nomination in 2020.

Outstanding Comedy Series
Year	Series	Season	Result	Ref.
1993	The Larry Sanders Show	1	Nominated	
1994	The Larry Sanders Show	2	Nominated	
1995	The Larry Sanders Show	3	Nominated	
1996	The Larry Sanders Show	4	Nominated	
1997	The Larry Sanders Show	5	Nominated	
1998	The Larry Sanders Show	6	Nominated	
1999	Sex and the City	1	Nominated	
2000	Sex and the City	2	Nominated	
2001	Sex and the City	3	Won	
2002	Sex and the City	4	Nominated	
2002	Curb Your Enthusiasm	2	Nominated	
2003	Sex and the City	5	Nominated	
2003	Curb Your Enthusiasm	3	Nominated	
2004	Sex and the City	6	Nominated	
2004	Curb Your Enthusiasm	4	Nominated	
2006	Curb Your Enthusiasm	5	Nominated	
2007	Entourage	3	Nominated	
2008	Entourage	4	Nominated	
2008	Curb Your Enthusiasm	6	Nominated	
2009	Entourage	5	Nominated	
2009	Flight of the Conchords	2	Nominated	
2010	Curb Your Enthusiasm	7	Nominated	
2012	Curb Your Enthusiasm	8	Nominated	
2012	Girls	1	Nominated	
2012	Veep	1	Nominated	
2013	Girls	2	Nominated	
2013	Veep	2	Nominated	
2014	Silicon Valley	1	Nominated	
2014	Veep	3	Nominated	
2015	Silicon Valley	2	Nominated	
2015	Veep	4	Won	
2016	Silicon Valley	3	Nominated	
2016	Veep	5	Won	
2017	Veep	6	Won	
2017	Silicon Valley	4	Nominated	
2018	Curb Your Enthusiasm	9	Nominated	
2018	Silicon Valley	5	Nominated	
2018	Barry	1	Nominated	
2019	Barry	2	Nominated	
2019	Veep	7	Nominated	
2020	Curb Your Enthusiasm	10	Nominated	
2020	Insecure	4	Nominated	
2022	Curb Your Enthusiasm	11	Nominated	
2022	Barry	3	Nominated	
2023	Barry	4	Nominated	
2024	Curb Your Enthusiasm	12	Nominated	

=== Lead Actor / Actress ===
Lead Actor in a Comedy Series

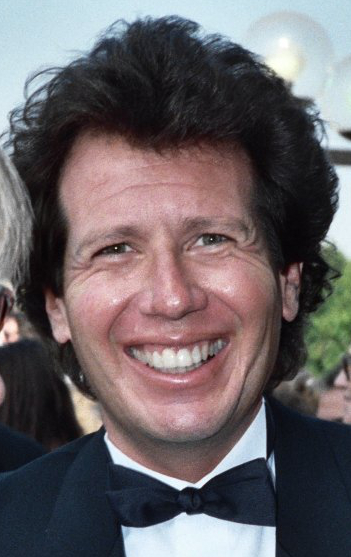
Garry Shandling received five acting nominations for The Larry Sanders Show.

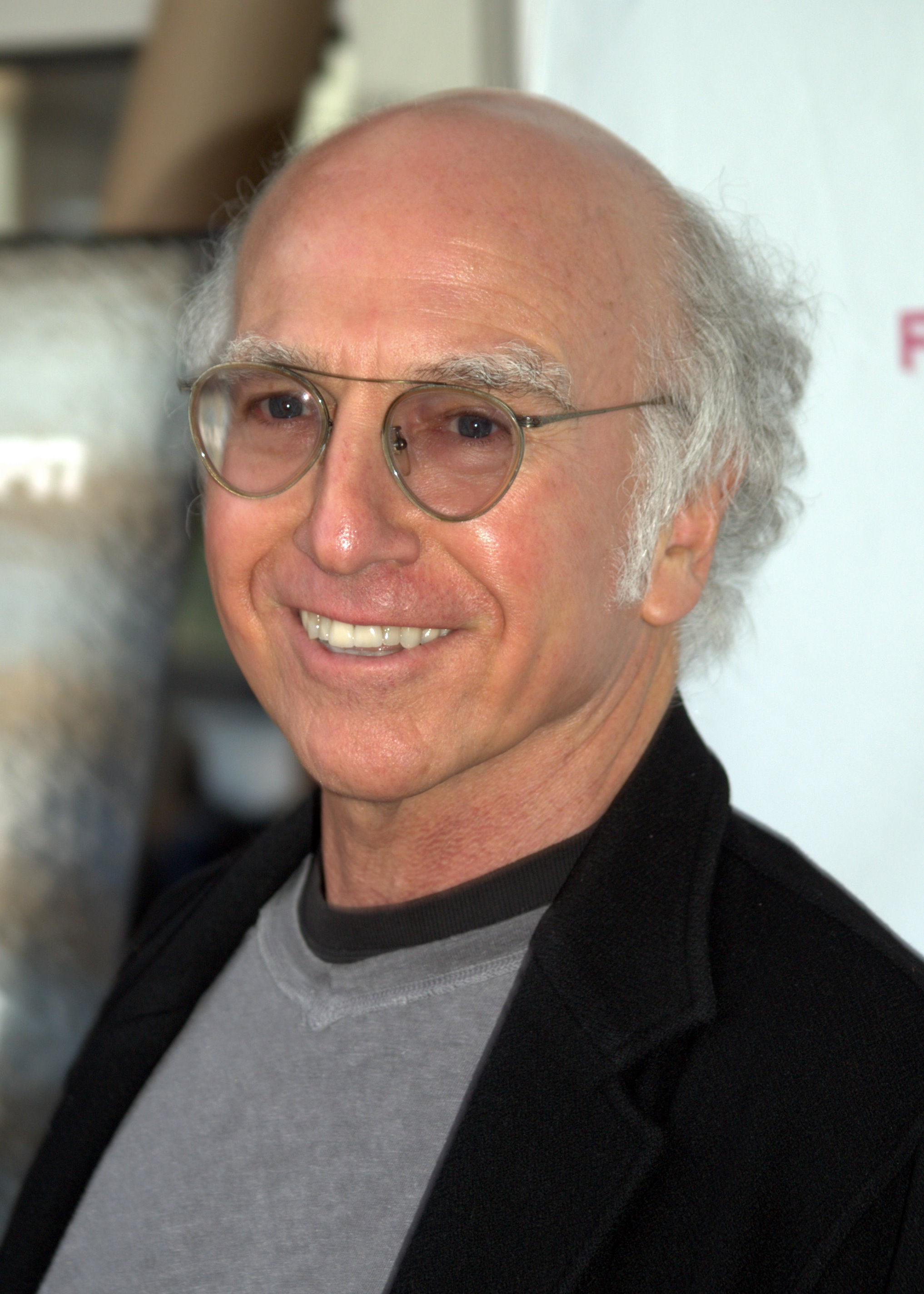
Larry David was nominated seven times for his work in Curb Your Enthusiasm.

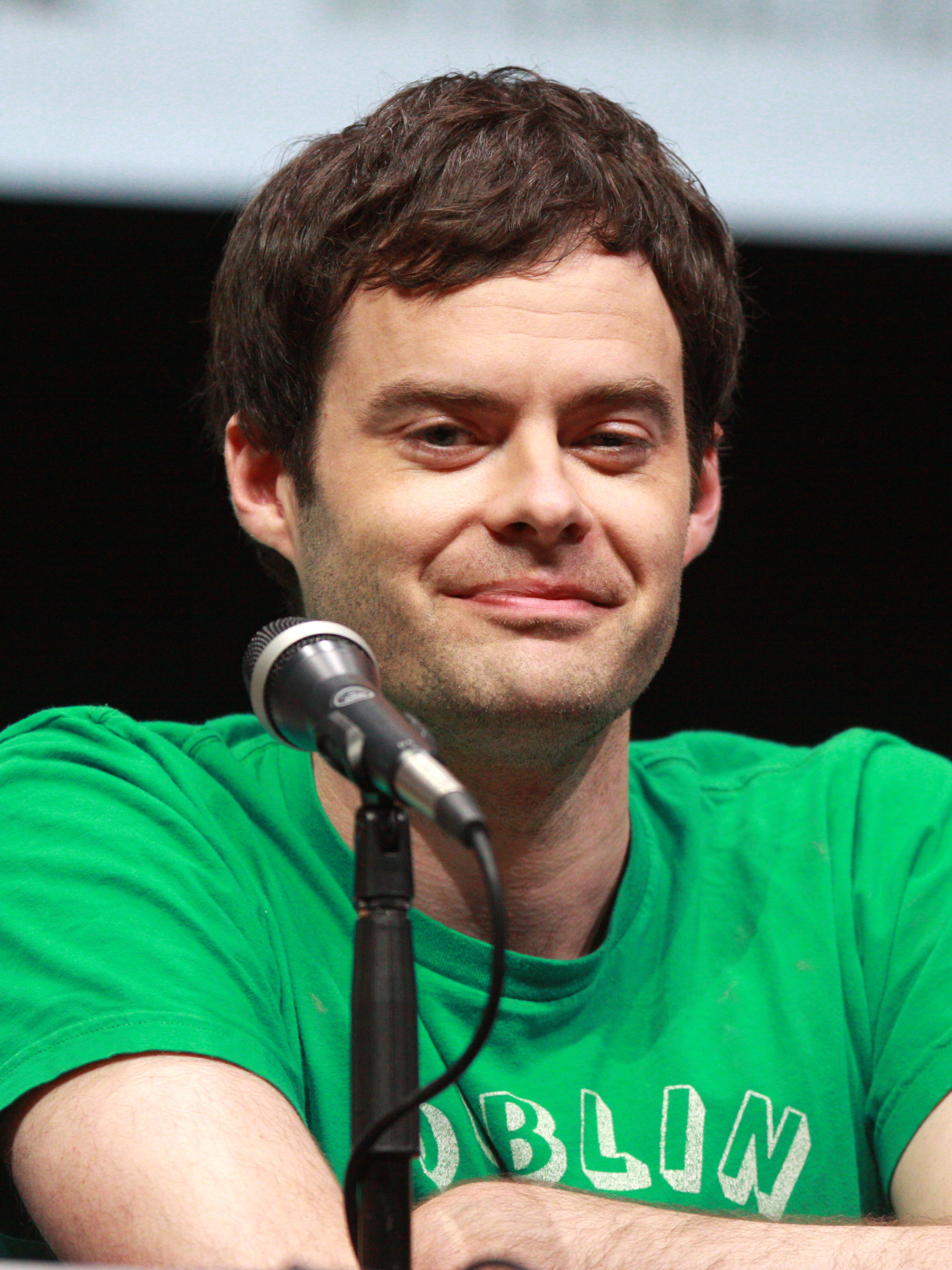
Bill Hader won twice for his role in Barry.

Outstanding Lead Actor in a Comedy Series
Year	Series	Actor	Role	Result	Ref.
1993	The Larry Sanders Show	Garry Shandling	Larry Sanders	Nominated	
1995	The Larry Sanders Show	Garry Shandling	Larry Sanders	Nominated	
1996	The Larry Sanders Show	Garry Shandling	Larry Sanders	Nominated	
1997	The Larry Sanders Show	Garry Shandling	Larry Sanders	Nominated	
1998	The Larry Sanders Show	Garry Shandling	Larry Sanders	Nominated	
2003	Curb Your Enthusiasm	Larry David	Larry David	Nominated	
2004	Curb Your Enthusiasm	Larry David	Larry David	Nominated	
2006	Curb Your Enthusiasm	Larry David	Larry David	Nominated	
2007	Extras	Ricky Gervais	Andy Millman	Won	
2009	Flight of the Conchords	Jemaine Clement	Jemaine	Nominated	
2010	Curb Your Enthusiasm	Larry David	Larry David	Nominated	
2012	Curb Your Enthusiasm	Larry David	Larry David	Nominated	
2016	Silicon Valley	Thomas Middleditch	Richard Hendricks	Nominated	
2018	Curb Your Enthusiasm	Larry David	Larry David	Nominated	
2018	Barry	Bill Hader	Barry Berkman/ Barry Block	Won	
2019	Barry	Bill Hader	Barry Berkman/ Barry Block	Won	
2022	Barry	Bill Hader	Barry Berkman/ Barry Block	Nominated	
2023	Barry	Bill Hader	Barry Berkman/ Barry Block	Nominated	
2024	Curb Your Enthusiasm	Larry David	Larry David	Nominated	
2026	Rooster	Steve Carell	Greg Russo	Nominated	

Lead Actress in a Comedy Series

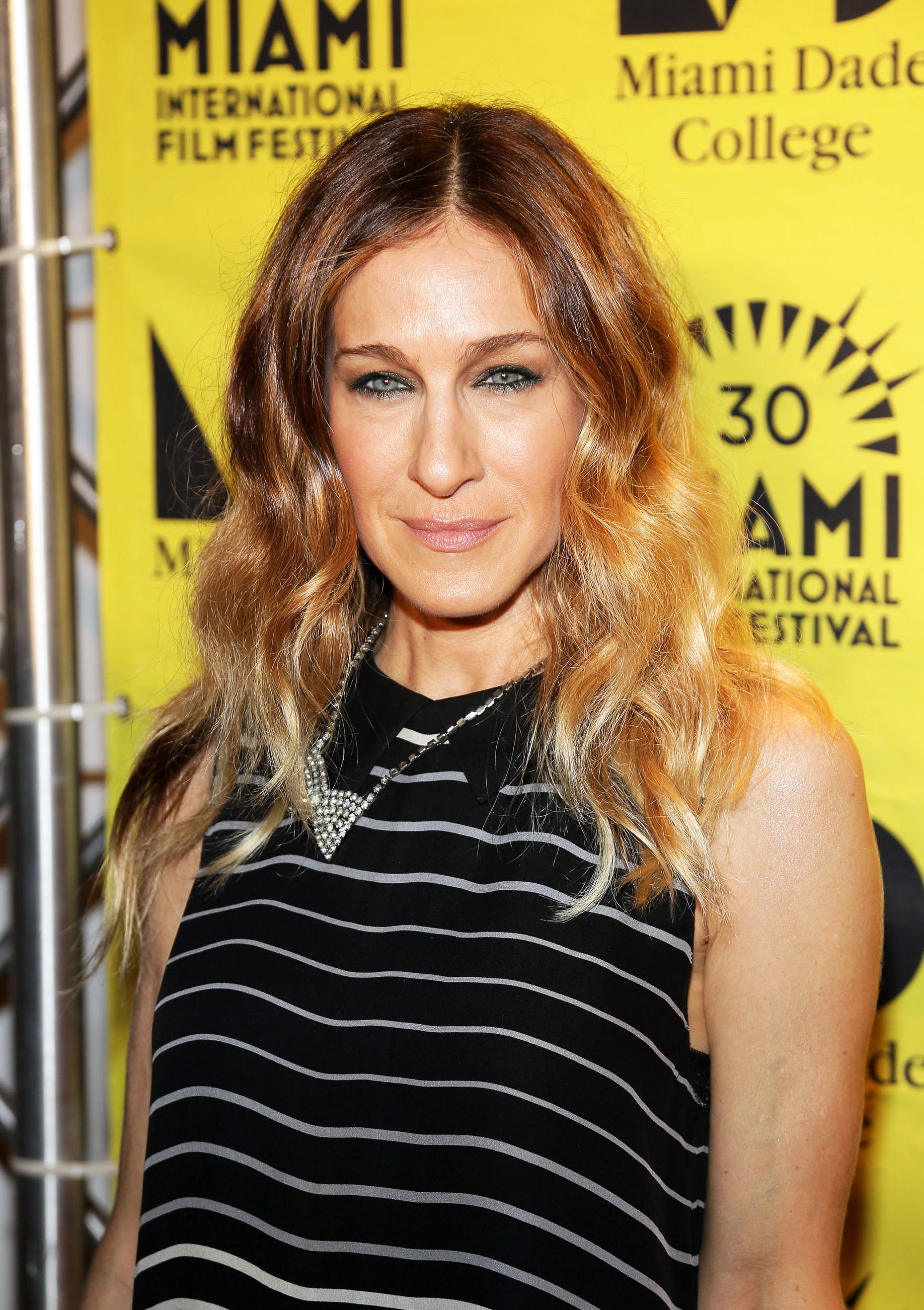
Sarah Jessica Parker received six nominations for her role as Carrie Bradshaw, winning in 2004.

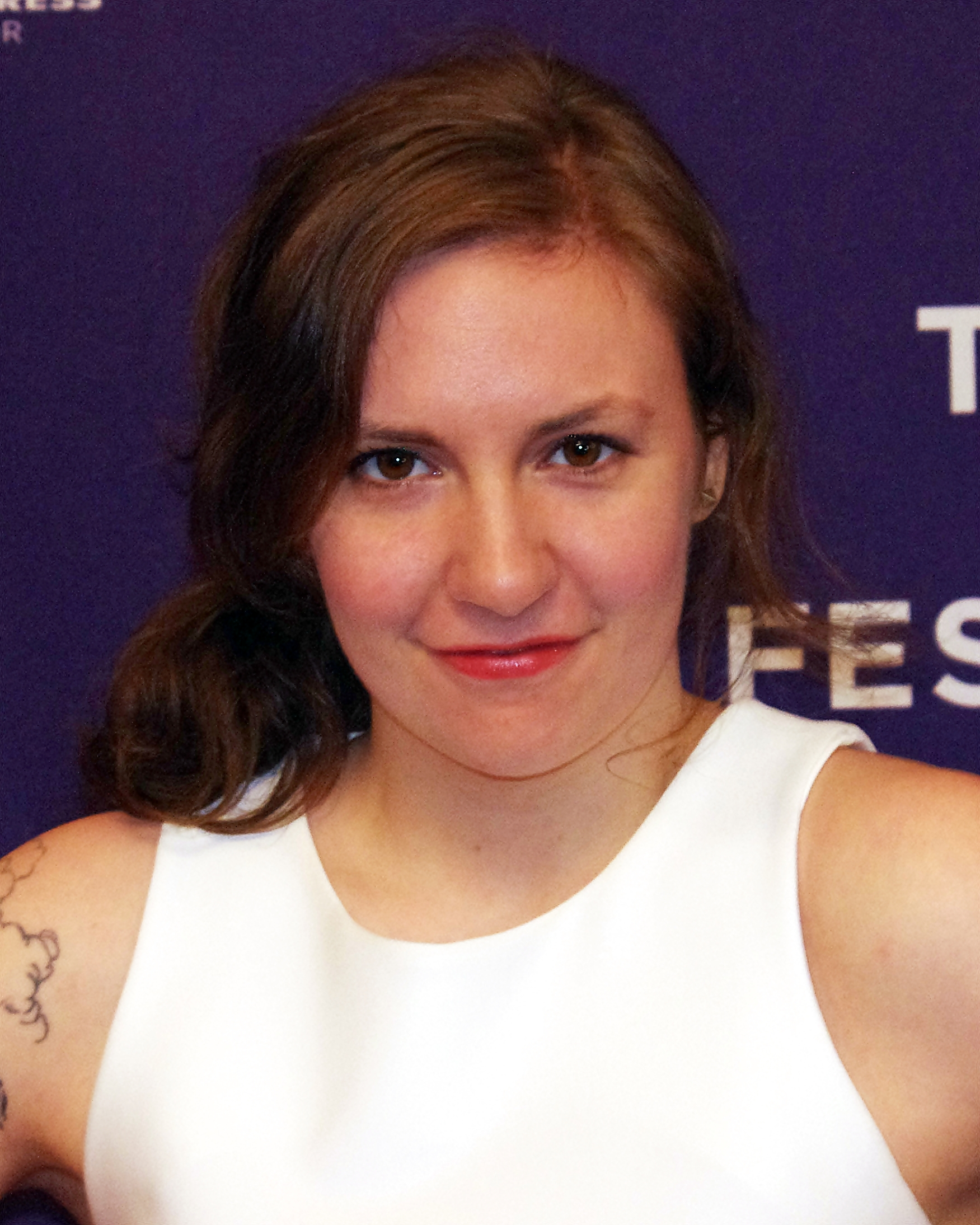
Lena Dunham received critical acclaim for Girls followed by three acting nominations.

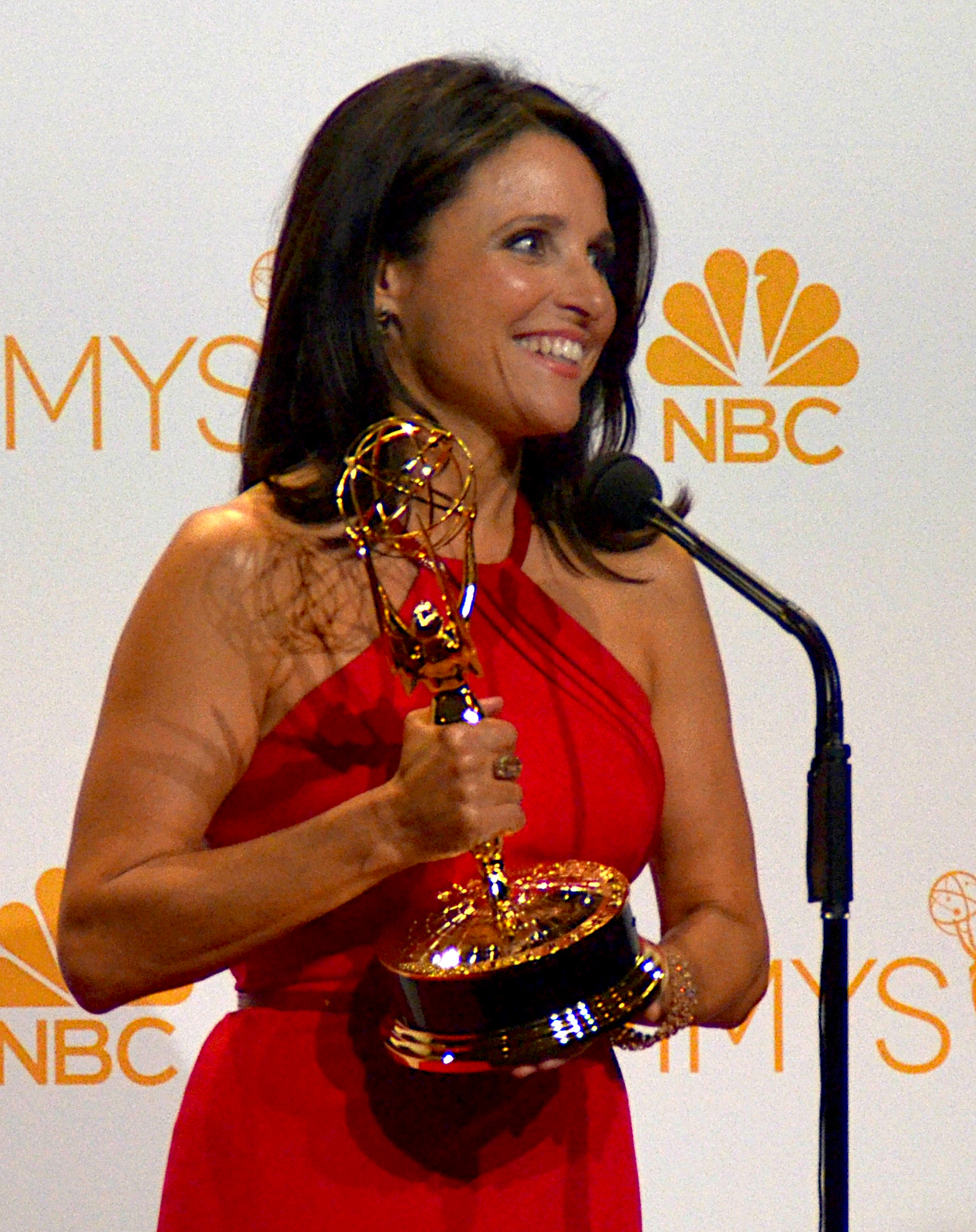
Julia Louis-Dreyfus won six consecutive times for her role as "an Unhappy Vice President" in Veep.

Outstanding Lead Actress in a Comedy Series
Year	Series	Actress	Role	Result	Ref.
1999	Sex and the City	Sarah Jessica Parker	Carrie Bradshaw	Nominated	
2000	Sex and the City	Sarah Jessica Parker	Carrie Bradshaw	Nominated	
2001	Sex and the City	Sarah Jessica Parker	Carrie Bradshaw	Nominated	
2002	Sex and the City	Sarah Jessica Parker	Carrie Bradshaw	Nominated	
2003	Sex and the City	Sarah Jessica Parker	Carrie Bradshaw	Nominated	
2004	Sex and the City	Sarah Jessica Parker	Carrie Bradshaw	Won	
2006	The Comeback	Lisa Kudrow	Valerie Cherish	Nominated	
2012	Girls	Lena Dunham	Hannah Horvath	Nominated	
2012	Veep	Julia Louis-Dreyfus	Selina Meyer	Won	
2013	Girls	Lena Dunham	Hannah Horvath	Nominated	
2013	Enlightened	Laura Dern	Amy Jellicoe	Nominated	
2013	Veep	Julia Louis-Dreyfus	Selina Meyer	Won	
2014	Girls	Lena Dunham	Hannah Horvath	Nominated	
2014	Veep	Julia Louis-Dreyfus	Selina Meyer	Won	
2015	The Comeback	Lisa Kudrow	Valerie Cherish	Nominated	
2015	Veep	Julia Louis-Dreyfus	Selina Meyer	Won	
2016	Getting On	Laurie Metcalf	Dr. Jenna James	Nominated	
2016	Veep	Julia Louis-Dreyfus	Selina Meyer	Won	
2017	Veep	Julia Louis-Dreyfus	Selina Meyer	Won	
2018	Insecure	Issa Rae	Issa Dee	Nominated	
2019	Veep	Julia Louis-Dreyfus	Selina Meyer	Nominated	
2020	Insecure	Issa Rae	Issa Dee	Nominated	
2022	Insecure	Issa Rae	Issa Dee	Nominated	
2026	The Comeback	Lisa Kudrow	Valerie Cherish	Nominated	

=== Supporting Actor / Actress ===
Supporting Actor in a Comedy Series

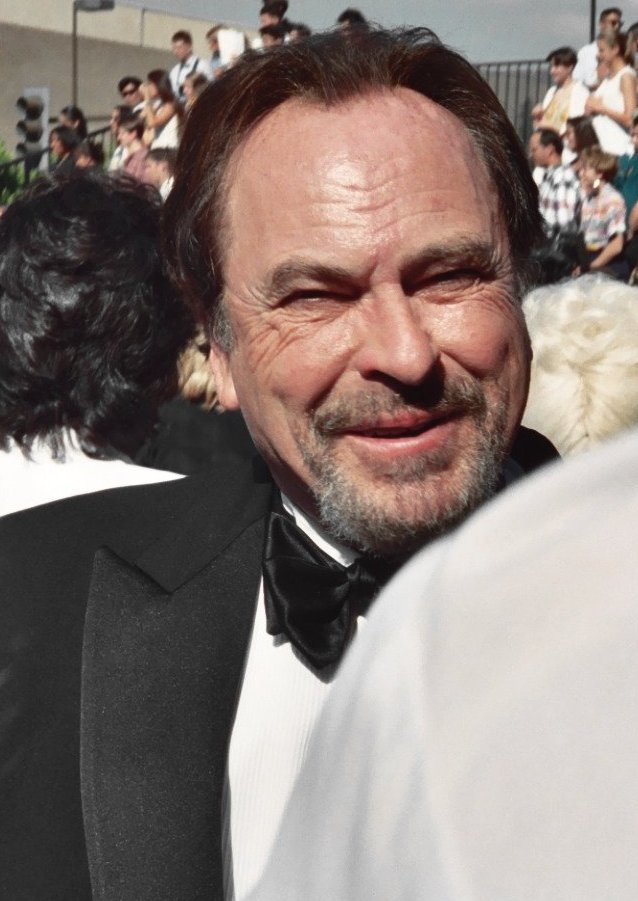
In 1996, Rip Torn became the first actor from HBO’s program to win this category.

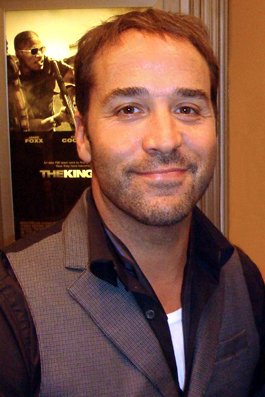
Jeremy Piven won three times for his performance in Entourage.

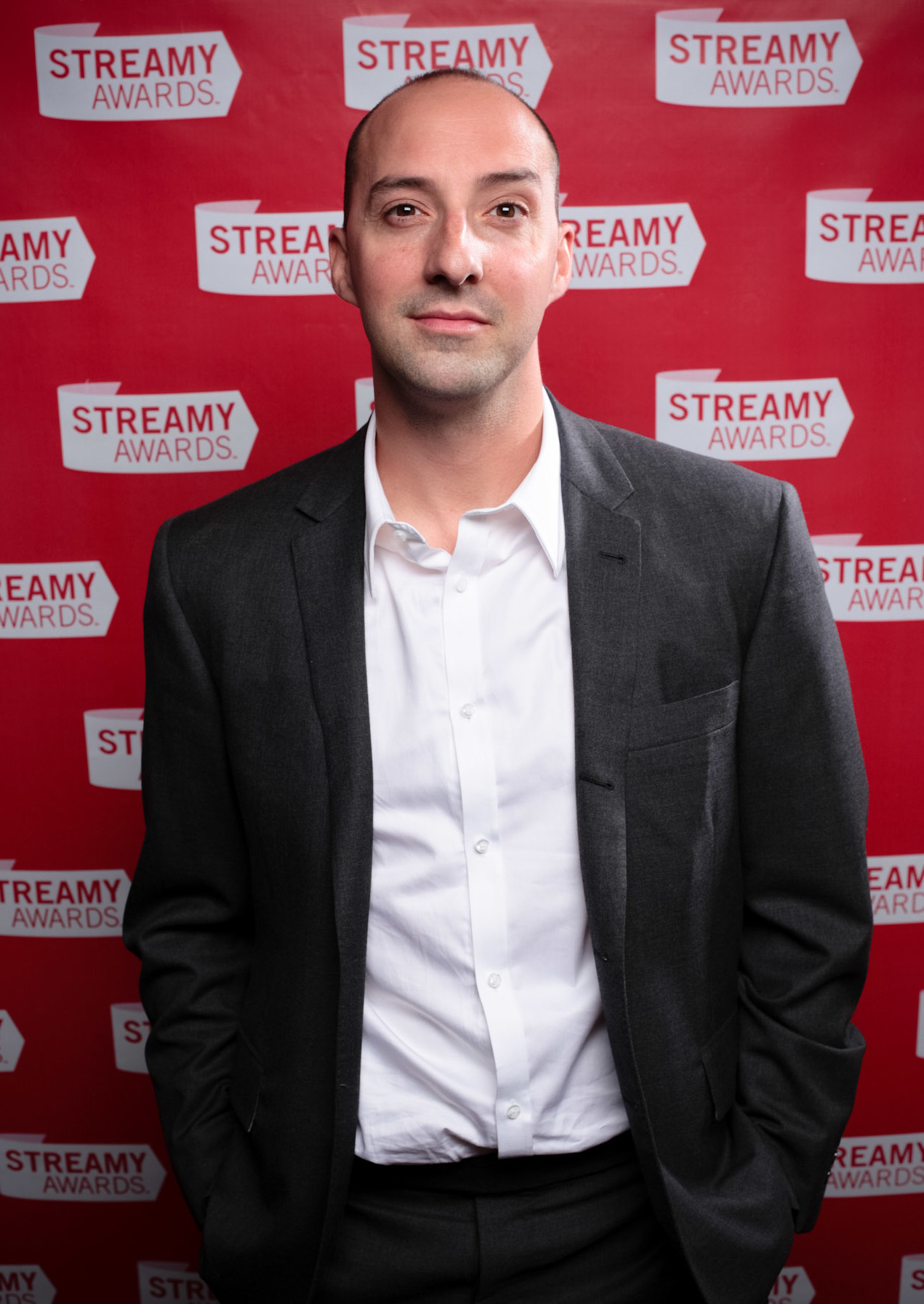
Tony Hale received six nominations for his role in Veep, winning in 2013 and 2015.

Outstanding Supporting Actor in a Comedy Series
Year	Series	Actor	Role	Result	Ref.
1993	The Larry Sanders Show	Jeffrey Tambor	Hank Kingsley	Nominated	
1993	The Larry Sanders Show	Rip Torn	Artie	Nominated	
1994	The Larry Sanders Show	Rip Torn	Artie	Nominated	
1995	The Larry Sanders Show	Rip Torn	Artie	Nominated	
1996	The Larry Sanders Show	Rip Torn	Artie	Won	
1996	The Larry Sanders Show	Jeffrey Tambor	Hank Kingsley	Nominated	
1997	The Larry Sanders Show	Jeffrey Tambor	Hank Kingsley	Nominated	
1997	The Larry Sanders Show	Rip Torn	Artie	Nominated	
1998	The Larry Sanders Show	Rip Torn	Artie	Nominated	
1998	The Larry Sanders Show	Jeffrey Tambor	Hank Kingsley	Nominated	
2005	Entourage	Jeremy Piven	Ari Gold	Nominated	
2006	Entourage	Jeremy Piven	Ari Gold	Won	
2007	Entourage	Jeremy Piven	Ari Gold	Won	
2007	Entourage	Kevin Dillon	Johnny "Drama" Chase	Nominated	
2008	Entourage	Kevin Dillon	Johnny "Drama" Chase	Nominated	
2008	Entourage	Jeremy Piven	Ari Gold	Won	
2009	Entourage	Kevin Dillon	Johnny "Drama" Chase	Nominated	
2013	Girls	Adam Driver	Adam Sackler	Nominated	
2013	Veep	Tony Hale	Gary Walsh	Won	
2014	Girls	Adam Driver	Adam Sackler	Nominated	
2014	Veep	Tony Hale	Gary Walsh	Nominated	
2015	Girls	Adam Driver	Adam Sackler	Nominated	
2015	Veep	Tony Hale	Gary Walsh	Won	
2016	Veep	Tony Hale	Gary Walsh	Nominated	
2016	Veep	Matt Walsh	Mike McLintock	Nominated	
2017	Veep	Matt Walsh	Mike McLintock	Nominated	
2017	Veep	Tony Hale	Gary Walsh	Nominated	
2018	Barry	Henry Winkler	Gene Cousineau	Won	
2019	Barry	Henry Winkler	Gene Cousineau	Nominated	
2019	Barry	Anthony Carrigan	NoHo Hank	Nominated	
2019	Barry	Stephen Root	Monroe Fuches	Nominated	
2019	Veep	Tony Hale	Gary Walsh	Nominated	
2022	Barry	Henry Winkler	Gene Cousineau	Nominated	
2022	Barry	Anthony Carrigan	NoHo Hank	Nominated	
2023	Barry	Anthony Carrigan	NoHo Hank	Nominated	
2023	Barry	Henry Winkler	Gene Cousineau	Nominated	
2025	Somebody Somewhere	Jeff Hiller	Joel	Won	

Supporting Actress in a Comedy Series

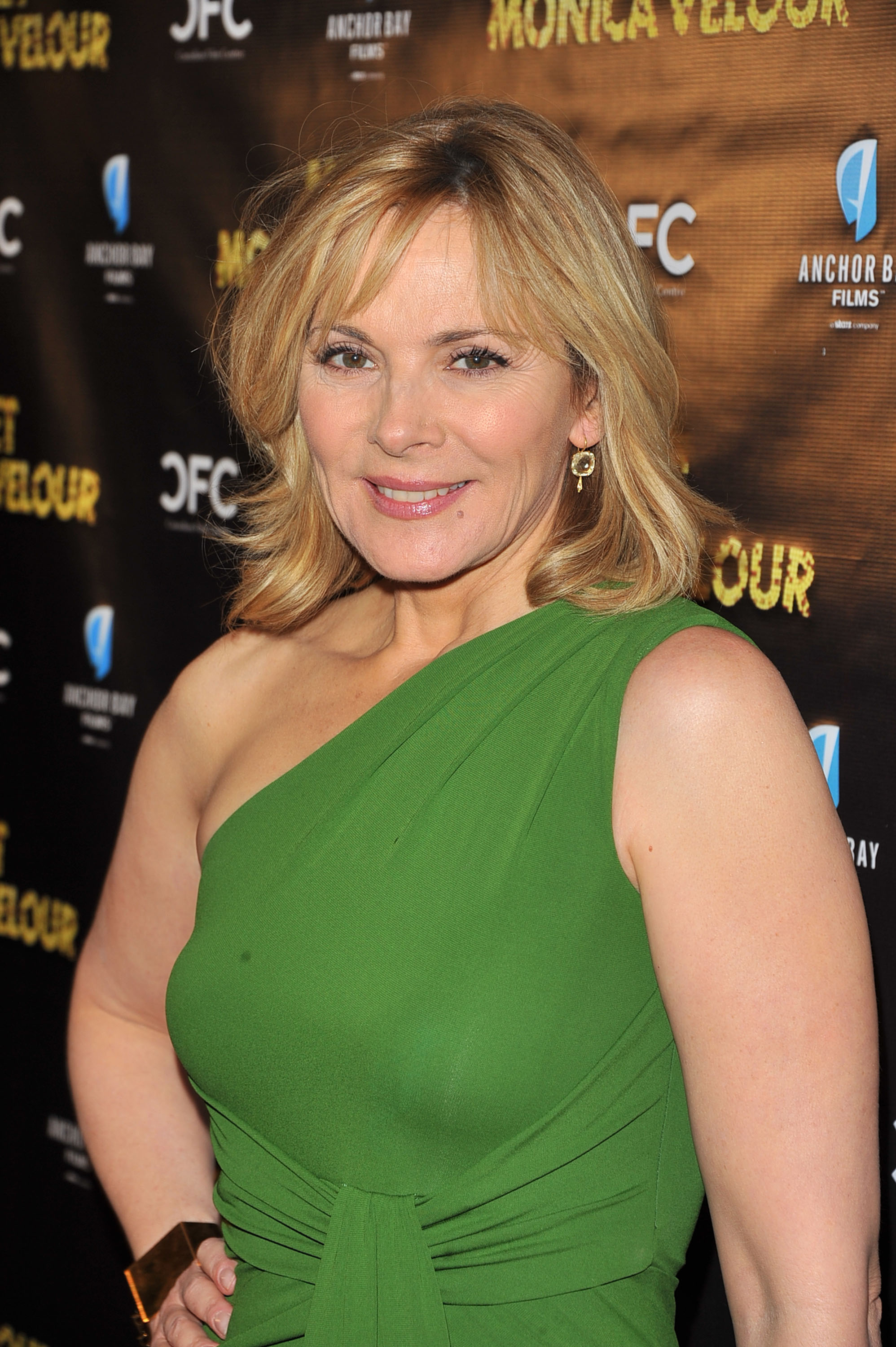
Kim Cattrall was nominated five times for her role in Sex and the City.

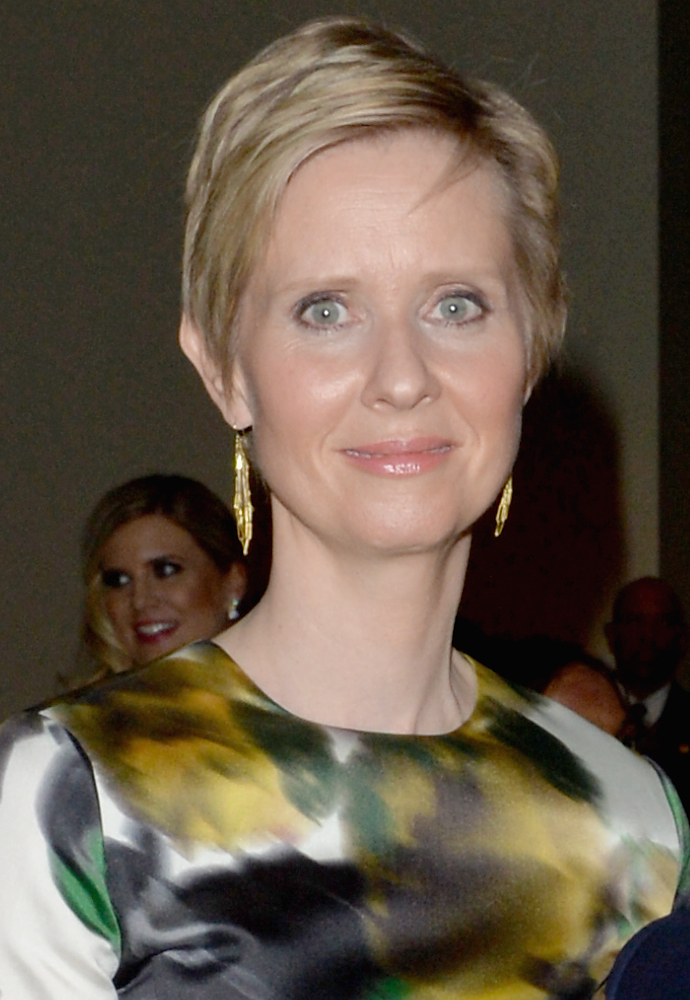
Cynthia Nixon won in 2004 for her performance as Miranda Hobbes.

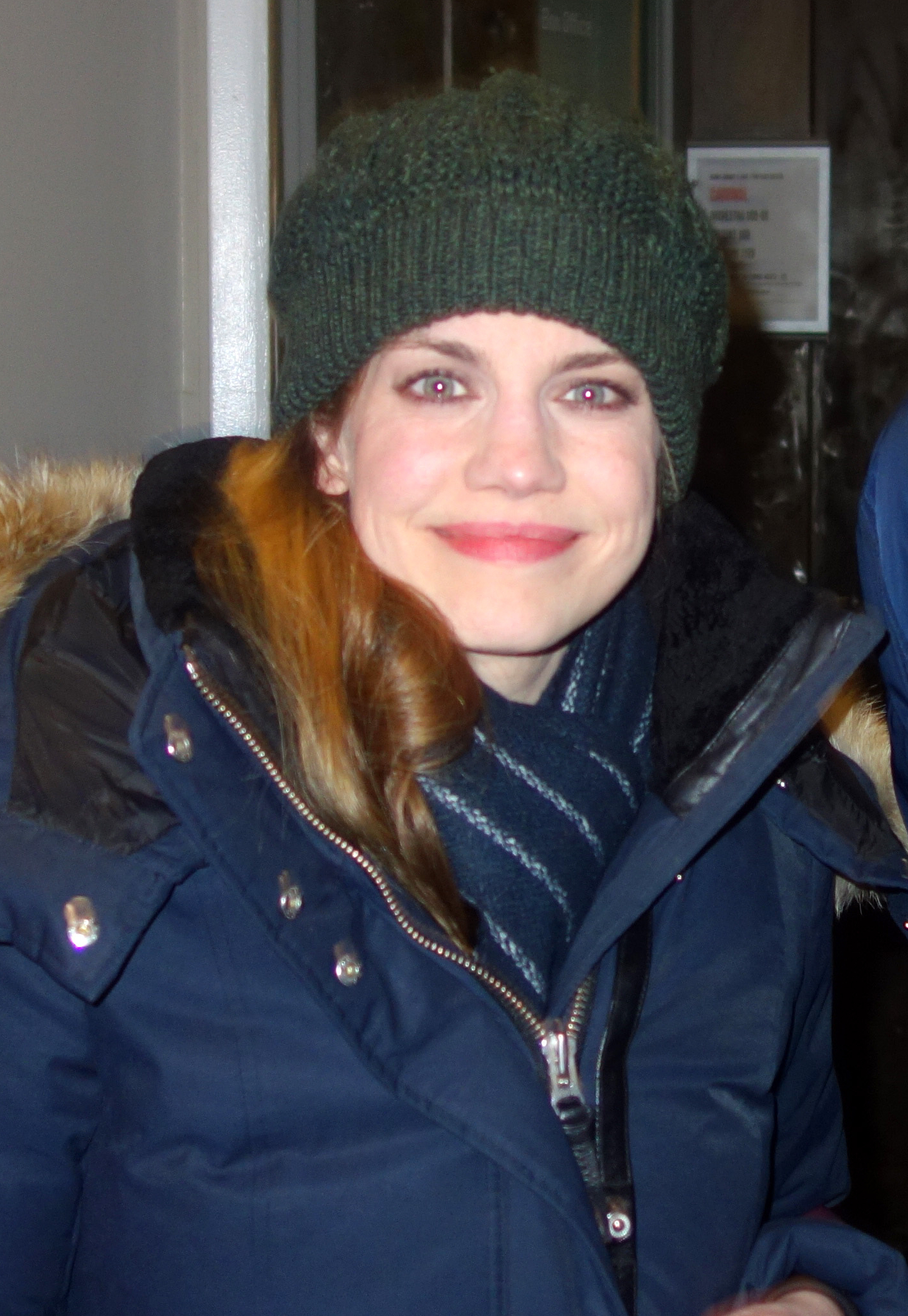
Anna Chlumsky was nominated six times for her performance in Veep.

Outstanding Supporting Actress in a Comedy Series
Year	Series	Actor	Role	Result	Ref.
1996	The Larry Sanders Show	Janeane Garofalo	Paula	Nominated	
1997	The Larry Sanders Show	Janeane Garofalo	Paula	Nominated	
2000	Sex and the City	Kim Cattrall	Samantha Jones	Nominated	
2001	Sex and the City	Kim Cattrall	Samantha Jones	Nominated	
2002	Sex and the City	Kim Cattrall	Samantha Jones	Nominated	
2002	Sex and the City	Cynthia Nixon	Miranda Hobbes	Nominated	
2003	Sex and the City	Cynthia Nixon	Miranda Hobbes	Nominated	
2003	Sex and the City	Kim Cattrall	Samantha Jones	Nominated	
2003	Curb Your Enthusiasm	Cheryl Hines	Cheryl David	Nominated	
2004	Sex and the City	Kim Cattrall	Samantha Jones	Nominated	
2004	Sex and the City	Cynthia Nixon	Miranda Hobbes	Won	
2004	Sex and the City	Kristin Davis	Charlotte York	Nominated	
2013	Veep	Anna Chlumsky	Amy Brookheimer	Nominated	
2014	Veep	Anna Chlumsky	Amy Brookheimer	Nominated	
2015	Getting On	Niecy Nash	Denise Ortley	Nominated	
2015	Veep	Anna Chlumsky	Amy Brookheimer	Nominated	
2016	Getting On	Niecy Nash	Denise Ortley	Nominated	
2016	Veep	Anna Chlumsky	Amy Brookheimer	Nominated	
2017	Veep	Anna Chlumsky	Amy Brookheimer	Nominated	
2019	Veep	Anna Chlumsky	Amy Brookheimer	Nominated	
2019	Barry	Sarah Goldberg	Sally Reed	Nominated	
2020	Insecure	Yvonne Orji	Molly Carter	Nominated	

=== Guest Actor / Actress ===
Guest Actor in a Comedy Series

Outstanding Guest Actor in a Comedy Series
Year	Series	Actor	Role	Result	Ref.
1993	Dream On	David Clennon	Peter Brewer	Won	
1993	The Larry Sanders Show	Dana Carvey	Himself	Nominated	
1994	Dream On	Jason Alexander	Randall Townsend	Nominated	
1994	Dream On	Paul Dooley	Mickey Tupper	Nominated	
1996	The Larry Sanders Show	Mandy Patinkin	Himself	Nominated	
1997	The Larry Sanders Show	David Duchovny	Himself	Nominated	
2006	Extras	Patrick Stewart	Himself	Nominated	
2006	Extras	Ben Stiller	Himself	Nominated	
2007	Entourage	Martin Landau	Bob Ryan	Nominated	
2007	Extras	Ian Mckellen	Himself	Nominated	
2008	Curb Your Enthusiasm	Shelley Berman	Nat David	Nominated	
2012	Curb Your Enthusiasm	Michael J. Fox	Himself	Nominated	
2014	Veep	Gary Cole	Kent Davison	Nominated	
2016	Girls	Peter Scolari	Tad Horvath	Won	
2016	Veep	Martin Mull	Bob Bradley	Nominated	
2017	Girls	Riz Ahmed	Paul-Louis	Nominated	
2017	Girls	Matthew Rhys	Chuck Palmer	Nominated	
2017	Veep	Hugh Laurie	Tom James	Nominated	
2018	Curb Your Enthusiasm	Bryan Cranston	Dr. Lionel Templeton	Nominated	
2018	Curb Your Enthusiasm	Lin-Manuel Miranda	Himself	Nominated	
2019	Veep	Peter MacNicol	Jeff Kane	Nominated	
2022	Curb Your Enthusiasm	Bill Hader	Igor/Gregor	Nominated	

Guest Actress in a Comedy Series

Outstanding Guest Actress in a Comedy Series
Year	Series	Actor	Role	Result	Ref.
1993	Dream On	Gwen Verdon	Kitty	Nominated	
1993	The Larry Sanders Show	Carol Burnett	Herself	Nominated	
1996	The Larry Sanders Show	Rosie O'Donnell	Herself	Nominated	
1997	The Larry Sanders Show	Ellen DeGeneres	Herself	Nominated	
2002	Sex and the City	Frances Sternhagen	Bunny MacDougal	Nominated	
2006	Extras	Kate Winslet	Herself	Nominated	
2013	Enlightened	Molly Shannon	Eileen Foliente	Nominated	
2015	Girls	Gaby Hoffmann	Caroline Sackler	Nominated	
2017	Girls	Becky Ann Baker	Loreen Horvath	Nominated	
2020	A Black Lady Sketch Show	Angela Bassett	Mo	Nominated	
2021	A Black Lady Sketch Show	Yvette Nicole Brown	Judge Anita Harper	Nominated	
2021	A Black Lady Sketch Show	Issa Rae	Jess	Nominated	

=== Directing and Writing ===
Outstanding Directing for a Comedy Series

Outstanding Directing for a Comedy Series
Year	Series	Season	Episode	Director	Result	Ref.
1993	Dream On	3	For Peter's Sake	Betty Thomas	Won	
1993	Dream On	3	And Bimbo Was His Name-O	Eric Laneuville	Nominated	
1994	The Larry Sanders Show	2	Life Behind Larry	Todd Holland	Nominated	
1995	The Larry Sanders Show	3	Hank's Night in the Sun	Todd Holland	Nominated	
1996	The Larry Sanders Show	4	Arthur After Hours	Todd Holland	Nominated	
1996	The Larry Sanders Show	4	I Was a Teenage Lesbian	Michael Lehmann	Nominated	
1997	The Larry Sanders Show	5	Ellen, or Isn't She?	Alan Myerson	Nominated	
1997	The Larry Sanders Show	5	Everybody Loves Larry	Todd Holland	Nominated	
1998	The Larry Sanders Show	6	Flip	Todd Holland	Won	
2001	Sex and the City	3	Easy Come, Easy Go	Michael Patrick King	Nominated	
2002	Sex and the City	4	The Real Me	Michael Patrick King	Won	
2002	Curb Your Enthusiasm	2	The Doll	Robert B. Weide	Nominated	
2003	Sex and the City	5	I Love a Charade	Michael Engler	Nominated	
2003	Curb Your Enthusiasm	3	Mary, Joseph and Larry	David Steinberg	Nominated	
2003	Curb Your Enthusiasm	3	The Nanny from Hell	Larry Charles	Nominated	
2003	Curb Your Enthusiasm	3	Krazee-Eyez Killa	Robert B. Weide	Nominated	
2003	Curb Your Enthusiasm	3	The Special Section	Bryan Gordon	Nominated	
2004	Sex and the City	6	An American Girl in Paris: Part Deux	Tim Van Patten	Nominated	
2004	Curb Your Enthusiasm	4	The 5 Wood	Bryan Gordon	Nominated	
2004	Curb Your Enthusiasm	4	The Car Pool Lane	Robert B. Weide	Won	
2004	Curb Your Enthusiasm	4	The Survivor	Larry Charles	Nominated	
2005	Entourage	1	Pilot	David Frankel	Nominated	
2006	Entourage	2	Sundance Kids	Julian Farino	Nominated	
2006	Entourage	2	Oh, Mandy	Daniel Attias	Nominated	
2006	The Comeback	1	Valerie Does Another Classic Leno	Michael Patrick King	Nominated	
2006	Curb Your Enthusiasm	5	The Christ Nail	Robert B. Weide	Nominated	
2007	Entourage	1	One Day in the Valley	Julian Farino	Nominated	
2007	Extras	2	Orlando Bloom	Stephen Merchant	Nominated	
2008	Flight of the Conchords	1	Sally Returns	James Bobin	Nominated	
2008	Entourage	4	No Cannes Do	Daniel Attias	Nominated	
2009	Entourage	5	Tree Trippers	Julian Farino	Nominated	
2009	Flight of the Conchords	2	The Tough Brets	James Bobin	Nominated	
2012	Curb Your Enthusiasm	8	Palestinian Chicken	Robert B. Weide	Nominated	
2012	Girls	1	She Did	Lena Dunham	Nominated	
2013	Girls	2	On All Fours	Lena Dunham	Nominated	
2014	Silicon Valley	1	Minimum Viable Product	Mike Judge	Nominated	
2015	Silicon Valley	2	Sand Hill Shuffle	Mike Judge	Nominated	
2015	Veep	4	Testimony	Armando Iannucci	Nominated	
2016	Veep	5	Kissing Your Sister	David Mandel	Nominated	
2016	Veep	5	Morning After	Chris Addison	Nominated	
2016	Veep	5	Mother	Dale Stern	Nominated	
2016	Silicon Valley	3	Founder Friendly	Mike Judge	Nominated	
2016	Silicon Valley	3	Daily Active Users	Alec Berg	Nominated	
2017	Veep	6	Blurb	Morgan Sackett	Nominated	
2017	Veep	6	Justice	Dale Stern	Nominated	
2017	Veep	6	Groundbreaking	David Mandel	Nominated	
2017	Silicon Valley	4	Intellectual Property	Jamie Babbit	Nominated	
2017	Silicon Valley	4	Server Error	Mike Judge	Nominated	
2018	Silicon Valley	5	Initial Coin Offering	Mike Judge	Nominated	
2018	Barry	1	Chapter One: Make Your Mark	Bill Hader	Nominated	
2019	Barry	2	ronny/lily	Bill Hader	Nominated	
2019	Barry	2	The Audition	Alec Berg	Nominated	
2022	Barry	3	710N	Bill Hader	Nominated	
2023	Barry	4	wow	Bill Hader	Nominated	
2025	The Rehearsal	2	Pilot's Code	Nathan Fielder	Nominated	
2026	The Chair Company	1	Life goes by too f**king fast, it really does.	Andrew DeYoung	Nominated	

Outstanding Writing for a Comedy Series

Outstanding Writing for a Comedy Series
Year	Series	Season	Episode	Writer	Result	Ref.
1993	Dream On	3	For Peter's Sake	David Crane and Marta Kauffman	Nominated	
1993	The Larry Sanders Show	1	The Hey Now Episode	Garry Shandling and Dennis Klein	Nominated	
1993	The Larry Sanders Show	1	The Spider Episode	Garry Shandling and Rosie Shuster, Paul Simms and Peter Tolan	Nominated	
1994	The Larry Sanders Show	2	Larry's Agent	Garry Shandling	Nominated	
1995	The Larry Sanders Show	3	Hank's Night in the Sun	Peter Tolan and Garry Shandling	Nominated	
1995	The Larry Sanders Show	3	The Mr. Sharon Stone Show	Peter Tolan and Garry Shandling	Nominated	
1996	The Larry Sanders Show	4	Arthur After Hours	Peter Tolan	Nominated	
1996	The Larry Sanders Show	4	Roseanne's Return	Garry Shandling	Nominated	
1996	The Larry Sanders Show	4	Hank's Sex Tape	Jon Vitti	Nominated	
1997	The Larry Sanders Show	5	Everybody Loves Larry	Jon Vitti	Nominated	
1997	The Larry Sanders Show	5	Ellen, or Isn't She?	Garry Shandling, Judd Apatow and John Markus	Nominated	
1997	The Larry Sanders Show	5	My Name is Asher Kingsley	Peter Tolan	Nominated	
1998	The Larry Sanders Show	6	Flip	Peter Tolan and Garry Shandling	Won	
1998	The Larry Sanders Show	6	Putting the 'Gay' Back in Litigation	Peter Tolan	Nominated	
2000	Sex and the City	2	Evolution	Cindy Chupack	Nominated	
2000	Sex and the City	2	Ex and the City	Michael Patrick King	Nominated	
2001	Sex and the City	3	Easy Come, Easy Go	Michael Patrick King	Nominated	
2002	Sex and the City	4	My Motherboard, My Self	Julie Rottenberg and Elisa Zuritsky	Nominated	
2003	Sex and the City	5	I Love a Charade	Cindy Chupack and Michael Patrick King	Nominated	
2004	Sex and the City	6	An American Girl in Paris: Part Deux	Michael Patrick King	Nominated	
2004	Sex and the City	6	The Ick Factor	Julie Rottenberg and Elisa Zuritsky	Nominated	
2006	Entourage	2	Exodus	Doug Ellin	Nominated	
2006	Extras	1	Kate Winslet	Ricky Gervais and Stephen Merchant	Nominated	
2007	Extras	2	Daniel Radcliffe	Michael Schur	Nominated	
2008	Flight of the Conchords	1	Yoko	James Bobin, Jemaine Clement and Bret McKenzie	Nominated	
2009	Flight of the Conchords	2	Prime Minister	James Bobin, Jemaine Clement and Bret McKenzie	Nominated	
2012	Girls	1	Pilot	Lena Dunham	Nominated	
2014	Silicon Valley	1	Optimal Tip-to-Tip Efficiency	Alec Berg	Nominated	
2014	Veep	3	Special Relationship	Simon Blackwell, Armando Iannucci and Tony Roche	Nominated	
2015	Veep	4	Election Night	Simon Blackwell, Armando Iannucci and Tony Roche	Won	
2015	Silicon Valley	2	Two Days of the Condor	Alec Berg	Nominated	
2016	Silicon Valley	3	The Uptick	Alec Berg	Nominated	
2016	Silicon Valley	3	Founder Friendly	Dan O'Keefe	Nominated	
2016	Veep	5	Mother	Alex Gregory and Peter Huyck	Nominated	
2016	Veep	5	Morning After	David Mandel	Nominated	
2017	Veep	6	Groundbreaking	David Mandel	Nominated	
2017	Veep	6	Georgia	Billy Kimball	Nominated	
2017	Silicon Valley	4	Success Failure	Alec Berg	Nominated	
2018	Silicon Valley	5	Fifty-One Percent	Alec Berg	Nominated	
2018	Barry	1	Chapter One: Make Your Mark	Alec Berg and Bill Hader	Nominated	
2018	Barry	1	Chapter Seven: Loud, Fast, and Keep Going	Elizabeth Sarnoff	Nominated	
2019	Veep	7	Veep	David Mandel	Nominated	
2019	Barry	2	ronny/lily	Alec Berg and Bill Hader	Nominated	
2022	Barry	3	starting now	Alec Berg and Bill Hader	Nominated	
2022	Barry	3	710N	Duffy Boudreau	Nominated	
2023	Barry	4	wow	Bill Hader	Nominated	
2025	Somebody Somewhere	3	AGG	Hannah Bos, Paul Thureen and Bridget Everett	Nominated	
2025	The Rehearsal	2	Pilot's Code	Nathan Fielder, Carrie Kemper, Adam Locke-Norton and Eric Notarnicola	Nominated	
2026	The Chair Company	1	Life goes by too f**king fast, it really does.	Tim Robinson and Zach Kanin	Nominated	
2026	The Comeback	3	Valerie Does It All	Michael Patrick King and Lisa Kudrow	Nominated	

== Limited Series / Movie ==
Limited or Anthology Series

Outstanding Limited or Anthology Series
Year	Series	Genre	Creator(s)	Result	Ref.
1998	From the Earth to the Moon	Docudrama	Tom Hanks	Won	
2000	The Corner	Drama	David Simon	Won	
2002	Band of Brothers	War drama	Tom Hanks and Steven Spielberg	Won	
2004	Angels in America	Drama	Mike Nichols	Won	
2005	Empire Falls	Drama	Fred Schepisi	Nominated	
2006	Elizabeth I	Historical drama	Nigel Williams	Won	
2008	John Adams	Historical drama	Tom Hanks	Won	
2009	Generation Kill	War drama	David Simon and Ed Burns	Nominated	
2010	The Pacific	War drama	Tom Hanks and Steven Spielberg	Won	
2011	Mildred Pierce	Drama	Todd Haynes	Nominated	
2014	Treme	Drama	David Simon	Nominated	
2015	Olive Kitteridge	Drama	Lisa Cholodenko	Won	
2017	Big Little Lies	Drama	David E. Kelley	Won	
2017	The Night Of	Crime drama	Richard Price and Steven Zaillian	Nominated	
2019	Chernobyl	Historical drama	Craig Mazin	Won	
2019	Sharp Objects	Crime drama	Richard Price and Steven Zaillian	Nominated	
2020	Watchmen	Drama	Damon Lindelof	Won	
2021	I May Destroy You	Black Comedy-Drama	Michaela Coel	Nominated	
2021	Mare of Easttown	Crime drama	Brad Ingelsby	Nominated	
2022	The White Lotus	Drama	Mike White	Won	
2024	True Detective: Night Country	Crime drama	Issa López	Nominated	
2025	The Penguin	Crime drama	Lauren LeFranc	Nominated	
2026	DTF St. Louis	Dark comedy	Steven Conrad	Won	

=== Television Movie ===
Outstanding Television Movie
Year	Film	Genre	Result	Ref.
1989	Murderers Among Us: The Simon Wiesenthal Story	Biography	Nominated	
1991	The Josephine Baker Story	Biography	Nominated	
1992	Without Warning: The James Brady Story	Drama	Nominated	
1993	Barbarians at the Gate	Biographical comedy-drama	Won	
1993	Stalin	Political drama	Won	
1993	Citizen Cohn	Drama	Nominated	
1993	The Positively True Adventures of the Alleged Texas Cheerleader-Murdering Mom	Biographical comedy	Nominated	
1994	And the Band Played On	Docu-drama	Won	
1995	Indictment: The McMartin Trial	Drama	Won	
1995	The Burning Season	Biographical drama	Nominated	
1995	Citizen X	Biographical drama	Nominated	
1996	Truman	Biographical drama	Won	
1996	The Late Shift	Biographical drama	Nominated	
1996	Tuskegee Airmen	Historical Drama	Nominated	
1997	Miss Evers' Boys	Historical Drama	Won	
1997	Gotti	Biographical drama	Nominated	
1997	If These Walls Could Talk	Drama	Nominated	
1997	In the Gloaming	Drama	Nominated	
1998	Don King: Only in America	Biographical drama	Won	
1998	A Bright Shining Lie	War drama	Nominated	
1998	Gia	Biographical drama	Nominated	
1999	A Lesson Before Dying	Drama	Won	
1999	The Rat Pack	Drama	Nominated	
2000	If These Walls Could Talk 2	Drama	Nominated	
2000	Introducing Dorothy Dandridge	Biographical drama	Nominated	
2000	RKO 281	Historical drama	Nominated	
2001	Wit	Drama	Won	
2001	Conspiracy	Drama	Nominated	
2001	For Love or Country: The Arturo Sandoval Story	Biographical drama	Nominated	
2001	61*	Sports drama	Nominated	
2002	The Gathering Storm	Biographical drama	Won	
2002	Dinner with Friends	Comedy-drama	Nominated	
2002	The Laramie Project	Drama	Nominated	
2002	Path to War	Biographical drama	Nominated	
2003	Live from Baghdad	War drama	Nominated	
2003	My House in Umbria	Mystery drama	Nominated	
2003	Normal	Drama	Nominated	
2004	Something the Lord Made	Biographical drama	Won	
2004	And Starring Pancho Villa as Himself	Western drama	Nominated	
2005	Warm Springs	Biographical drama	Won	
2005	Lackawanna Blues	Biographical drama	Nominated	
2005	The Life and Death of Peter Sellers	Biographical drama	Nominated	
2006	The Girl in the Café	Drama	Won	
2006	Mrs. Harris	Drama	Nominated	
2006	Yesterday	Drama	Nominated	
2007	Bury My Heart at Wounded Knee	Western drama	Won	
2007	Longford	Biographical drama	Nominated	
2008	Recount	Political drama	Won	
2008	Bernard and Doris	Drama	Nominated	
2008	Extras: The Extra Special Series Finale	Comedy	Nominated	
2009	Grey Gardens	Biographical drama	Won	
2009	Into the Storm	Biographical drama	Nominated	
2009	Taking Chance	Historical drama	Nominated	

=== Lead Actor / Actress ===
Lead Actor in a Limited Series or Movie

Outstanding Lead Actor in a Limited or Anthology Series or Movie
Year	Series	Actor	Role	Result	Ref.
1988	Mandela	Danny Glover	Nelson Mandela	Nominated	
1989	Murderers Among Us: The Simon Wiesenthal Story	Ben Kingsley	Simon Wiesenthal	Nominated	

== See also ==
- List of Primetime Emmy Awards received by Netflix
