= Chokeslam (film) =

- Directed by: Robert Cuffley
- Written by: Robert Cuffley; Jason Long
- Produced by: Carolyn McMaster; Anand Ramayya
- Starring: Chris Marquette; Amanda Crew; Niall Matter; Michael Eklund; Mick Foley; Agam Darshi
- Cinematography: Andrew Watt, csc
- Edited by: Bridget Durnford
- Music by: Raj Ramayya
- Production companies: CHAOSafilmcompany; Karma Film
- Distributed by: A71
- Release dates: October 2, 2016 (Calgary); April 17, 2017
- Running time: 102 minutes
- Country: Canada
- Language: English

Chokeslam is a 2016 Canadian romantic comedy film directed by Robert Cuffley and starring Chris Marquette, Amanda Crew, Niall Matter, Michael Eklund and Mick Foley. The film follows Corey Swanson (Marquette) prior to a high school reunion, as he tries to make amends with a girlfriend who had publicly rejected him, and had since become a professional wrestler.

It premiered at the Calgary International Film Festival in October 2016, and was given a wide Canadian release on April 7, 2017.

== Plot ==
Ten years since high school graduation, deli clerk Corey Swanson (Chris Marquette) still lives in the shadow of the humiliating public rejection of his marriage proposal to high school sweetheart Sheena DeWilde (Amanda Crew). Sheena is now a successful, if troubled, Pro-Wrestler, and is returning to town for their high school reunion. When she announces her retirement, Corey attempts to win back her affections by arranging for one last match, to take place in the town's wrestling arena. Thwarted by the efforts of his overprotective mother (Gwynyth Walsh), well meaning friend Luke (Michael Eklund), who is concealing his own motives, and by Sheena's brash boyfriend/manager Tab (Niall Matter), Corey struggles both to make the event a success for Sheena, and to remind her of what they once had.

== Cast ==
- Amanda Crew as Sheena "Smasheena" DeWilde
- Chris Marquette as Corey Swanson
- Michael Eklund as Luke Petrie
- Niall Matter as Tab Hennessey
- Mick Foley as Patrick
- Gwynyth Walsh as Janet Swanson
- Agam Darshi as Dr. Hayden
- Meghan Heffern as Evelyn DeWilde
- Barry Flatman as Malcolm
- Chelsea Green as Andrea "Angel"
- Lance Storm as Pit Stank

== Production ==
The film was produced by CHAOSafilmcompany Inc. and Karma Film. It was developed through the Canadian Film Centre and Just for Laughs 2014 Telefilm Canada Feature Comedy Exchange. It received funding from Creative Saskatchewan, which supports projects filming in Saskatchewan.

Cuffley, who had been working on this project since 2002, co-wrote the screenplay with frequent writing partner Jason Long. The film also sees the director reunite with two of his previous collaborators in Amanda Crew, who starred in Cuffley's 2012 feature Ferocious and Michael Eklund, with whom he has worked on several projects including Ferocious and the 2007 feature Walk All Over Me.

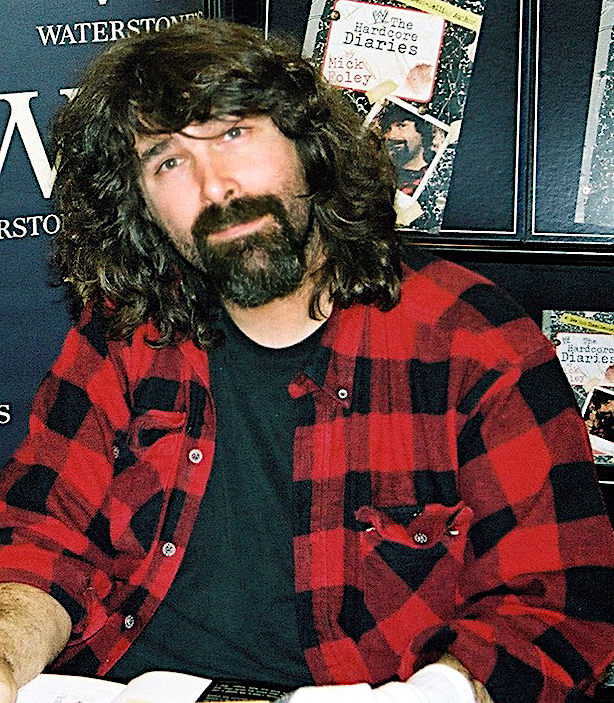
Wrestler Mick Foley, who appears in the film

Amanda Crew had no previous wrestling experience, and trained extensively for her role, in order to obtain an authentic physique. She also received advice and assistance from both Mick Foley and Impact Wrestling professional Chelsea Green.

=== Filming ===
Filming took place in Lumsden and Regina, Saskatchewan, in 2015. The wrestling scenes were shot in the historic Regina Exhibition Stadium, with local residents serving as extras. As well as Mick Foley, wrestlers Lance Storm, Harry Smith (son of "The British Bulldog" Davey Boy Smith and nephew of Bret Hart), and Chelsea Green performed in the wrestling matches.

== Release ==
The premiere took place at the Calgary International Film Festival on 2 October 2016, as the closing gala film, with the cast and crew in attendance. The film was shown at the 2016 Whistler Film Festival, where it was picked up by A71.

Chokeslam previewed in selected Canadian cinemas on March 15, 2017, and premiered across Canada on April 7, 2017.

=== Critical reception ===
The film received praise from film festival critics, cited as a "a strangely entertaining fusion of comedy, romance, and sport that stands out in a sea of repetitive rom-coms". Michael Eklund's performance in particular received high praise.

The film won in four categories at the 2017 Rosie (AMPIA) Awards: Best Dramatic feature or Made-for-TV Movie: Carolyn McMaster, producer; Best Director (Drama over 30 minutes: Robert Cuffley; Best Screenwriter (Drama over 30 minutes):Jason Long and Robert Cuffley; Best Editor (Drama over 30 minutes):Bridget Durnford.

However, the film holds an approval rating of 29% on Rotten Tomatoes, based on 7 reviews, with an average rating of 4.5/10.
