= Robert Cuffley =

Canadian film director and screenwriter

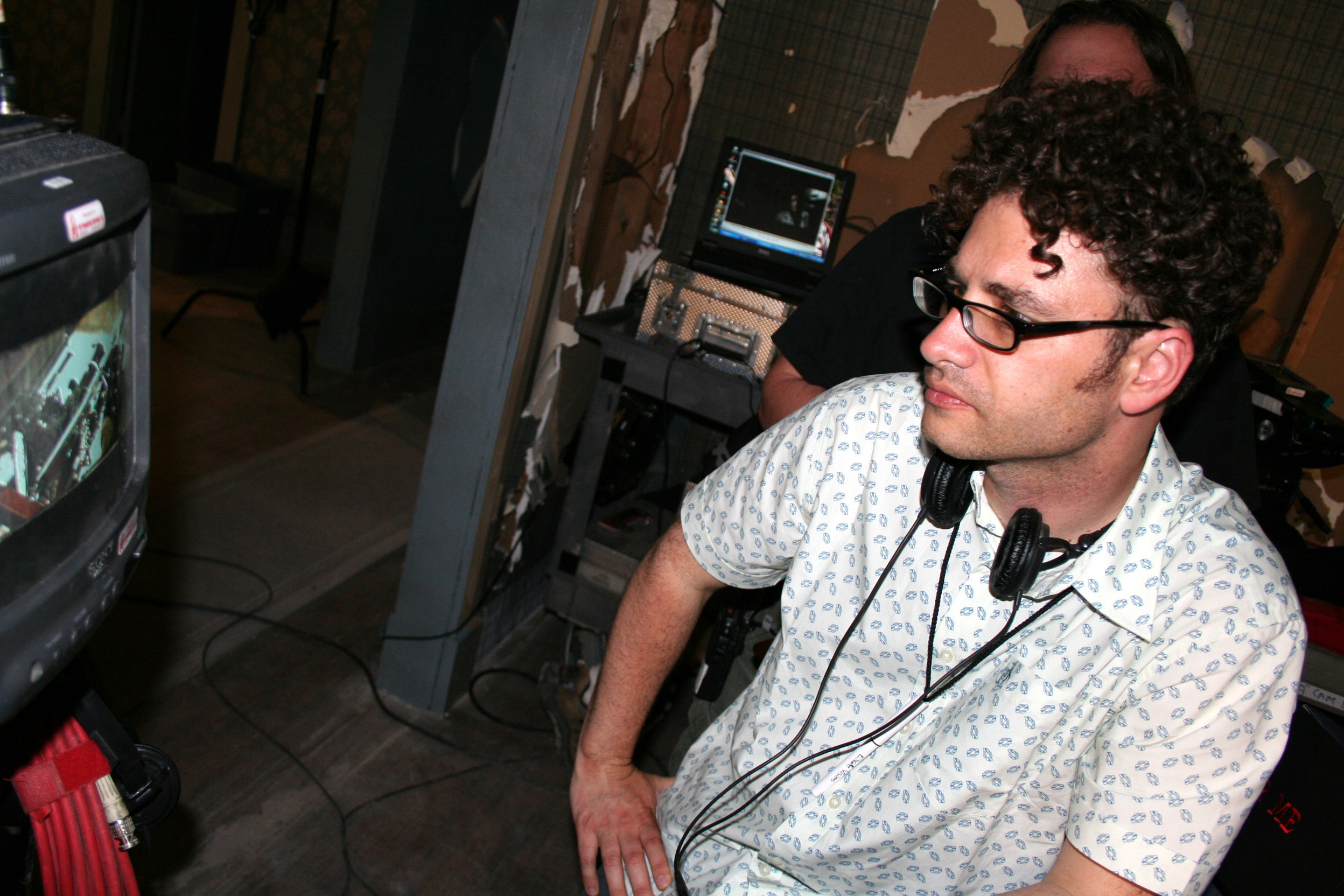
- Born: Calgary, Alberta, Canada
- Occupations: Director, Producer, Writer
- Years active: 1996-Present

Robert Cuffley is a Canadian film director and screenwriter. He began with music videos, directing over 40 in all, before moving into short films, and later, drama.

== Career ==
In 2001, Cuffley directed Turning Paige (2001), starring Nicholas Campbell and Katharine Isabelle.

Following this, he directed Walk All over Me (2007), starring Leelee Sobieski.

In 2012, he directed Ferocious, a suspense thriller starring Amanda Crew, which screened at the Calgary International Film Festival in 2012.

In 2013, Robert exec-produced Ally Was Screaming, a feature film shot in Calgary.

In 2018, Robert exec-produced In Plainview, a feature film shot in Calgary.

In 2018, Robert exec-produced Jonesin' , a feature film shot in Calgary.

In 2016, Robert co-wrote and directed Chokeslam, a wrestling comedy starring Amanda Crew, Chris Marquette, Michael Eklund, Mick Foley and Niall Matter. The film premiered at the Calgary International Film Festival on October 2, 2016. It went on to win four awards at the 2017 AMPIA Rosie Award, including Best Director for Cuffley.

In 2018 Cuffley began filming short films, including Penny Whistle which played the 2018 Telluride Horror Festival and was nominated for Best short at the Blood in the Snow Film Festival.

In 2019 Cuffley won best short in festival at the 2019 Blood in the Snow Film Festival with his short film Romi, starring Camille Sullivan.

In 2020, Cuffley directed Bright Hill Road, a feature film shot in Stavely, Alberta.

In 2020 Cuffley won audience favorite award, again for Romi, at the 2020 Calgary Underground Film Festival.

== Filmography ==
- Turning Paige (2001)
- Walk All over Me (2007)
- Ferocious (2013)
- Chokeslam (2017)
- Bright Hill Road (2020)
- Penny Whistle (short film) (2018)
- Romi (short film) (2019)
- Mama's Home (short film) (2020)
- Something Is Near (short film) (2020)
