= Anna Howard (cinematographer) =

Australian cinematographer

Anna Howard is an Australian cinematographer and became an accredited member of the Australian Cinematographers Society (ACS) in 2004. Her work in the Australian film industry began in 1981 and her credits include numerous roles in feature films, documentaries, television and commercials.

== Career ==
After studying cinematography at North Sydney TAFE, she became a camera assistant, working for some of Australia's best cinematographers, including Peter James ASC, ACS and Academy Award winners Russell Boyd ASC, ACS, Andrew Lesnie ASC, ACS, and John Seale ASC, ACS. She worked on the award-winning Australian TV series Rake in 2010 and the next year she was nominated for Best Cinematography in the Film Critics Circle of Australia Awards for the film South Solitary, directed by Shirley Barrett.

Her cinematography in Errors of the Human Body was widely praised, as ScreenInvasion Critic Gabriel Ruzin wrote, "Its bleak cinematography is notable and makes impressive work of cold blues, blacks, grays, and the unfriendly sterility of the film’s main setting that deftly complements Geoff’s (Michael Eklund) inner emptiness." Dan Collacott of Liberation Frequency noted, "The film is beautifully shot within the clinical and snowy surrounds of The Max Planck Institute in Dresden...full of hauntingly sterile shades of white and grey." Michał Matuszewski at Transatlantyk Film Festival described the film as, "highlighted by imaginative shots in claustrophobic interiors of the Max Planck Institute."

== Filmography ==
=== Feature films ===
- Rabbit , 2017
- Errors of the Human Body, 2012
- South Solitary, 2010
- Hey Hey It's Esther Blueburger, 2008
- Rats and Cats, Directed by Tony Rogers, 2007

=== Documentaries ===
- Brazen Hussies, 2020
- Women He Undressed, 2015
- Bombora The Story of Australian Surfing, 2009
- Girl in a Mirror, 2005
