= Prince Charming (2001 film) =

American television film

- Based on: The Frog Prince by the Brothers Grimm
- Written by: Doug Palau
- Directed by: Allan Arkush
- Starring: Martin Short; Christina Applegate; Andrea Martin Billy Connolly Bernadette Peters; Sean Maguire
- Music by: Lisa Coleman; Wendy Melvoin
- Country of origin: United States
- Original language: English

Production
- Producers: George Horie; Martin Walters; Matthew O'Connor
- Cinematography: Jamie Anderson
- Editor: John Duffy
- Running time: 87 minutes

Original release
- Network: TNT
- Release: October 21, 2001

Prince Charming is a 2001 American television film. It is a comical fairy tale, relating the story of a prince who is cursed and transported to present-day New York City. The film stars Martin Short as a wizard squire of modest talents trying to keep his prince (Sean Maguire) from harm, with Christina Applegate as a young woman skeptical of the prince's story, who nevertheless wins his love, and Bernadette Peters as an actress who inadvertently lifts a 500-year curse.

== Plot ==
Prince John of the fictional province of Anwyn prides himself on having rescued countless maidens as a way of eventually bedding them. In order to end three centuries of war with the realm of Lothian, he is made to marry the princess, who is convinced that they will live happily ever after. However, on his wedding day, Prince John commits a romantic indiscretion and is discovered, breaking the heart of the princess. As punishment, he is cursed by being turned into a frog forever, until such time as a maiden kisses him and marries him by the next full moon. For good measure, his squire Rodney is similarly "frogged". The spell allows them to live for as long as it takes for John to be kissed human again.

Waiting 500 years, the Prince and Rodney, in the form of frogs, find themselves in New York's Central Park, where the Prince sees Kate driving her horse-drawn carriage and is almost kissed by her before she is interrupted and instead is released within Central Park. Later, an aging actress, Margo, impetuously picks up the frog prince and kisses him, breaking the curse until the next full moon, and turning the Prince and Rodney into their human selves (still dressed in medieval clothing, and with no knowledge of how the world has changed over the centuries).

Prince John and Rodney begin their search for the woman who kissed John, with the reluctant help of a skeptical Kate. After a series of comic encounters and setbacks, the Prince, in his human form, finally meets Margo, who is performing Shakespeare's "Romeo and Juliet". She decides to make her unfaithful lover, Hamish, jealous by initiating a romantic tryst. The Prince, realizing that he must marry Margo in order to permanently break the curse, proposes marriage, even as he is falling in love with Kate, who teaches him what true love is. Meanwhile, Rodney finds in Serena a fellow "wizard", and they try to find potions that will ensure that Prince John marries Margo.

In the end, the Prince decides to marry Kate, and almost gives up his humanity forever to do so. After Kate kisses him back into a human being, all three couples manage to find themselves with the right person, the curse is forever broken by true love (as was foretold when the spell was first enacted), and all marry to live happily ever after in modern New York City.

== Cast listing ==
- Martin Short as Rodney, a wizard squire
- Christina Applegate as Kate, a horse-drawn carriage driver / Princess Gwendolyn of Lothian
- Andrea Martin as Serena, Margo's dresser
- Billy Connolly as Hamish, director/Margo's lover
- Bernadette Peters as Margo, a starting-to-age Broadway actress
- Sean Maguire as Prince "Charming" John of Anwyn, the young Prince
- Colin Fox as King Leo of Anwyn, Prince John's father
- Carly Street as Beautiful Maiden
- Marcia Bennett as Queen Isabel of Lothian
- Colm Magner as Lothian Knight
- Jake Goldsbie as Boy
- Vickie Papavs as Mother
- David Fox as King Pius of Lothian
- Julia Paton as Milkmaid
- Meredith McGeachie as Camille / "Helena"
- Kimwun Perehinec as Young Woman with Bike
- David MacLean as Minister
- Frank Ruffo as Shopkeeper
- Denny Doherty as Jeweller
- Duane Murray as Actor
- Stefan Brogren as Bob Worthington
- Lou Martini Jr. as Angry Cabbie
- Christine Brubaker as Clerk
- Philip DeWilde as Delivery Boy
- Clyde Whitham as Judge #1
- Roger Clown as Judge #2
- Robert Buck as Judge #3
- Sid Kroach as Lady #1
- Mark Burgess as Rep Actor / "Romeo"
- Novie Edwards as Salesgirl
- Ian Leung as Tour Guide
- John Stead as Tybalt
- Angela Vint as Waitress
- Julian Richings as Wacktazar
- Laird Mackintosh as Young Anwyn Noble
- Richard Quesnel as Anwyn Knight
- Michael Boisvert as Thisbe

== Production notes ==
The Delacorte Theatre in Central Park, New York, was used during filming of the Shakespeare productions. The television film was initially broadcast in the United States on the TNT station in July 2003.

Guru Studios, a Special Effects Company provided additional character animation.

== Critical response ==
The New York Times reviewer wrote "She [Applegate] and Mr. Maguire make a suitably cute couple, and Mr. Short throws as much energy as he can muster (as usual, a lot) into the comic sidekick bit. Ms. Peters and Billy Connolly, as a full-of-himself director, do what they can. Only Andrea Martin, as Serena, Margo's put-upon gofer, manages to find (or invent) some real comedy."

== See also ==
- "The Frog Prince", the fairy tale on which this film is loosely based
