= The Grace Card =

- Theatrical release poster
- Directed by: David Evans
- Written by: Howard Klausner
- Produced by: Howard Klausner; John R. Saunders
- Starring: Louis Gossett Jr. Michael Jeffrey Joiner; Michael Higgenbottom; Stephen Dervan
- Cinematography: John Paul Clark
- Edited by: Mark Pruett
- Production companies: GraceWorks Pictures; Provident Films
- Distributed by: Affirm Films; Samuel Goldwyn Films
- Release dates: September 23, 2010 (Projecting Hope); February 25, 2011 (United States)
- Country: United States
- Language: English
- Budget: $450,000
- Box office: $2.4 million

The Grace Card is a 2010 Christian drama film directed by David G. Evans. The film stars Louis Gossett Jr., Michael Higgenbottom and Michael Joiner. It was released on February 25, 2011, to 363 theaters, grossing $1 million in its opening weekend.

== Plot ==
When Mac McDonald (Michael Joiner) loses his son in an accident, the ensuing 17 years of bitterness and pain erode his love for his family and leave him angry with almost everyone, including God. Mac's rage damages his career in the police department, and his household is as frightening as anything he encounters on the streets of Memphis. Money is tight, arguments with his wife are common, and his surviving son Blake is hanging with the wrong crowd and in danger of failing school.

Things become heated when Mac is partnered with Sam Wright (Mike Higgenbottom), a rising star on the force who happens to be a part-time pastor and a family man. Sam never expected to be a police officer. He feels called to be a minister like his grandfather. In addition to leading a small, start-up church, Sam works as a police officer to provide for his family. When he gets promoted to Sergeant, however, Sam starts questioning if his true calling might be police work.

Can Sam and Mac somehow join forces or is it nearly impossible for either of them to look past their differences, especially their race?

== Production ==
Filming for The Grace Card began in Memphis, Tennessee on October 14, 2009. The climax of the film was shot at Messiah Missionary Baptist Church on Chelsea. Other locations included St. Francis Hospital and the downtown banks of the Mississippi River. Screenwriter Howard Klausner explained, "We look at this project as Fireproof 2.0. The Sherwood Baptist guys have opened up a door for all of us, proving that faith-based features can stand up in the marketplace... Maybe it’s just because so few films coming out of Hollywood reflect the values we [Christians] hold dear."

The Calvary Church of the Nazarene in Cordova was the film's "sponsoring church." Church volunteers worked in the catering, wardrobe, hair and makeup departments, in addition to the professional filmmakers who handled the film's technical aspects. Director David Evans said about 90 percent of the 40 full-time crew members were mid-Southerners, as were almost all the 100-plus supporting actors and extras. They volunteered more than 10,000 hours, and the film was shot in 28 days.

== Release ==
On its opening day of wide release, The Grace Card grossed $360,000, and its opening weekend was $1,010,299. It was released to 352 theaters, with a $2,870 per-theater average.

=== Reception ===
On review aggregator Rotten Tomatoes, the film holds an approval rating of 36% based on 28 reviews, with an average rating of 5.60/10. The website's critical consensus reads, "Tailored for a very specific audience, The Grace Card delivers its noble religious message via implausible plot twists and preachy dialogue." On Metacritic the film has a weighted average score of 43 out of 100, based on 14 critics, indicating "mixed or average reviews"

Steve Persall of the St. Petersburg Times said in a positive review, "This is a solid, sincere affirmation of faith and forgiveness. Praise the Lord, and pass the popcorn." Mike Hale of The New York Times said "Responses to religious films are bound to be personal, so at the risk of sounding patronizing, I'll say that my main reaction to The Grace Card was one of pleasant surprise at its competence." Orlando Sentinel's Roger Moore said, "The eggshells the screenwriter and director walk on distance the story from the reality it aims to imitate. And that robs this tale of loss, grief and redemption of its punch."

Critics did praise lead actor Michael Joiner, with The Hollywood Reporter and Variety giving Joiner rave reviews for his performance, as well as The Times of Northwest Indiana and The Kansas City Star.
