= Dead for a Dollar =

2022 American film by Walter Hill

- Theatrical release poster
- Directed by: Walter Hill
- Screenplay by: Walter Hill
- Story by: Matt Harris; Walter Hill
- Produced by: Jeff Sackman; Berry Meyerowitz; Kirk D'Amico; Jeremy Wall; Carolyn McMaster; Neil Dunn
- Starring: Christoph Waltz; Willem Dafoe; Rachel Brosnahan; Warren Burke; Benjamin Bratt
- Cinematography: Lloyd Ahern II
- Edited by: Phil Norden
- Music by: Xander Rodzinski
- Production companies: CHAOS a film company; Polaris Pictures; Myriad Pictures
- Distributed by: Myriad Pictures; Quiver Distribution
- Release dates: September 6, 2022 (Venice); September 30, 2022 (United States)
- Running time: 106 minutes
- Country: United States
- Language: English
- Box office: $81,403

Dead for a Dollar is a 2022 American western action thriller film written and directed by Walter Hill. It stars Christoph Waltz, Willem Dafoe, and Rachel Brosnahan. The plot follows a bounty hunter (Waltz) on a search to find the missing wife (Brosnahan) of a businessman. Brandon Scott, Warren Burke, Benjamin Bratt, and Hamish Linklater also star. The film premiered out of competition at the 79th Venice International Film Festival on September 6, 2022. It was released in the United States on September 30, 2022, by Quiver Distribution.

== Plot ==
In 1897, in New Mexico Territory, veteran bounty hunter Max Borlund learns that Joe Cribbens, a card sharp and armed robber who served five years in prison after being brought to justice by Borlund, will soon be released. Borlund visits Cribbens to warn him against following through with his vow to "buy a gun and look him up".

A friend of Borlund's introduces him to a businessman, Martin Kidd, who hires Borlund to retrieve his wife, Rachel. He tells Borlund that Rachel was abducted and is being held for ransom in Chihuahua, Mexico by Elijah Jones, an African American army deserter. The officer assigns one of his men, Sergeant Alonzo Poe, to assist Borlund as he was a close friend of Jones and has a map to his hideout, after agreeing to deliver the ransom money. En route, the two men run afoul of Tiberio Vargas, a rich landowner who moonlights as a vicious bandit. Borlund refuses to accede to Vargas's extortion and forces him to leave.

Jones explains that he had made an arrangement with Vargas to obtain passage to Cuba for $5,000, which he planned to pay for out of the ransom. Borlund and Poe find the two runaways hiding with Jack Hannon, an American fugitive who mistakenly assumes that Borlund is after him and threatens Rachel's head. Borlund shoots him and saves her. Cribbens also heads south to Chihuahua, where he tries to support himself by winning poker games. One night, he wins a large sum of money from William "English Bill" Palmer; when Palmer threatens Cribbens at gunpoint for his money back, the latter shoots Palmer dead in self-defense. Vargas goes to see Cribbens and reveals that he and Palmer were working together on a lucrative mining scheme. Since Cribbens killed him, Vargas insists that he now owes him a "favor".

Borlund and his party reach a small border town, where the local police captain agrees to incarcerate Jones and send a telegram to Martin informing him that Rachel has been found. Told to keep an eye on Jones, Poe secretly explains that he intends to set him free, feeling that Jones deserves a chance to live his life how he chooses. Borlund realises this and devises a plan to help Poe engineer Jones's escape once they cross over into the United States.

Borlund learns from Rachel what he had already begun to suspect: Rachel was not abducted; she chose to leave with Jones because Martin married her only for her money and routinely cheats on her with other women. She believes that her husband, humiliated by a black man running off with his wife, has no intention of taking her back home alive. Vargas sends Cribbens to kill Borlund; Poe and Rachel aim their guns at him and Cribbens leaves empty-handed. Vargas then intercepts the stagecoach transporting Martin into Mexico and the two men cut a deal. When Martin arrives, he bribes the captain's corrupt deputy to cover for him while he shoots Jones dead in his cell.

Rachel and her husband reunite and Martin admits that he paid Vargas off to rape and kill her, hoping to sell her death as a story to the newspapers to boost his political ambitions. Rachel takes out her derringer and shoots Martin dead. Vargas and his men arrive and murder both the captain and his deputy. Borlund kills several bandits, while Poe and Rachel kill the rest in a close-quarters shoot-out with the help of a friendly female innkeeper. Vargas manages to shoot Poe in the shoulder, while Cribbens sneaks up from behind and shoots him. Borlund offers his old enemy the chance to leave with his life but Cribbens refuses and subsequently dies when Borlund outdraws him.

Poe is patched up and the movie ends as the three go their separate ways after returning to America. Poe serves in the army for nearly thirty years, retires and dies an old man in a veterans' home in 1937, Rachel never remarries and spends the rest of her life fighting for politically progressive causes after moving to Philadelphia and Borlund works as a bounty hunter for the rest of his days.

== Cast ==
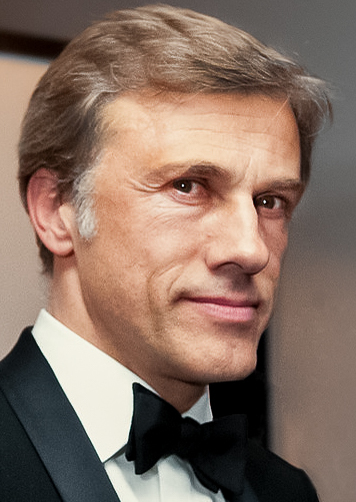
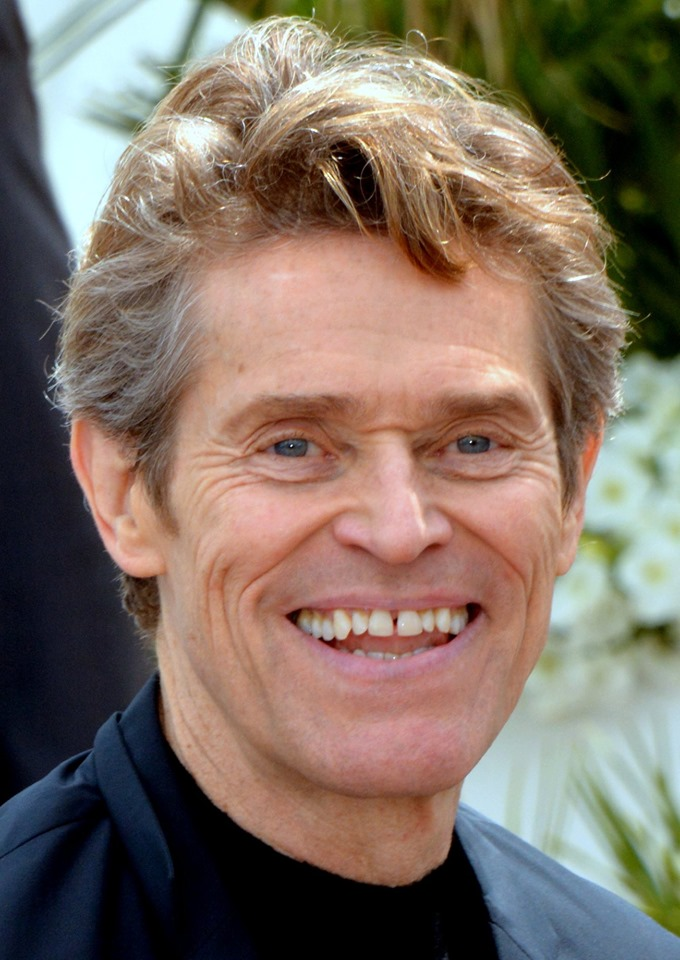
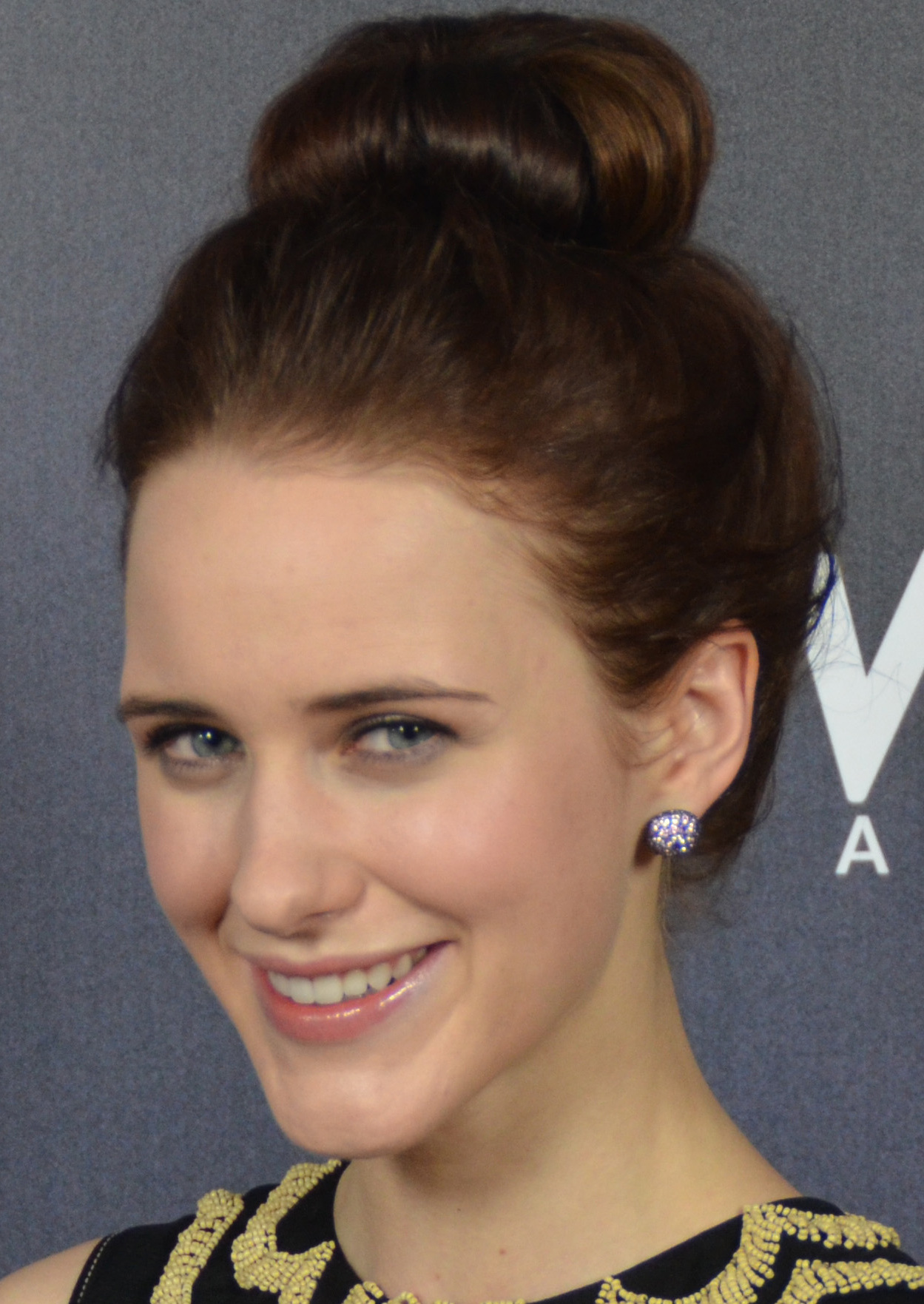
L–R: Christoph Waltz, Willem Dafoe and Rachel Brosnahan
- Christoph Waltz as Max Borlund
- Willem Dafoe as Joe Cribbens
- Rachel Brosnahan as Rachel Kidd
- Warren Burke as Sergeant Alonzo Poe
- Brandon Scott as Elijah Jones
- Benjamin Bratt as Tiberio Vargas
- Luis Chavez as Esteban Romero
- Hamish Linklater as Martin Kidd
- Fidel Gomez as Captain Aragon
- Guy Burnet as English Bill
- Alfredo Quiroz as Deputy Enrique Bustamonte
- Scott Peat as Jack Tyree
- Jackamoe Buzzell as Jack Hannon

== Production ==
=== Development and filming ===
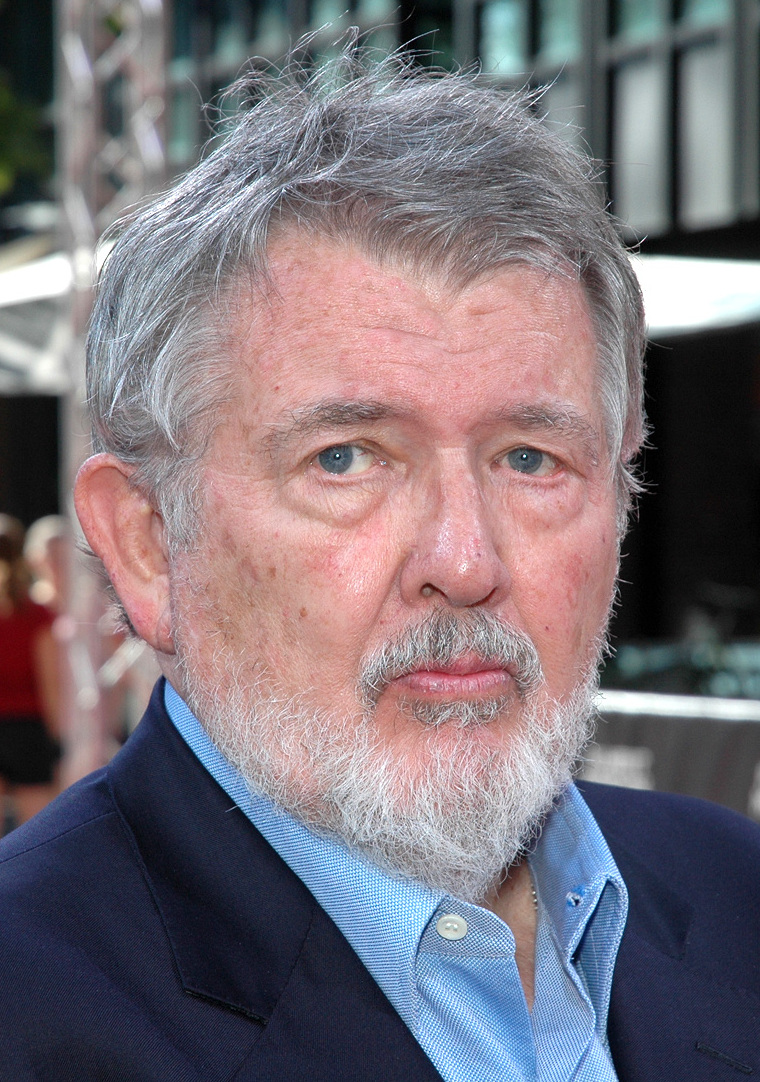
Writer-director Walter Hill

Hill later recalled he had worked on the script "for about a year and a half, not constantly." The Christopher Waltz character was based on a real character, Chris Madsen, a US Marshal from Denmark. "I thought the idea of a European immigrant as protagonist was a nice, off-center way of getting into a story," said Hill. "We're so used to the Joel McCrea, Randolph Scott, John Wayne Anglo kind of guy." However he stressed the role was fictionalised.

The film was announced at the Marché du Film in June 2021. It marks Waltz's return to the genre after Django Unchained (2012) and Hill's return to directing after The Assignment (2016). Principal photography took place in Santa Fe, New Mexico, from August 24 to September 21, 2021. Approximately 80 crew members, 20 principal cast members, and 40 background and extras from New Mexico were employed for the shoot.

=== Grievance about filming incident ===
On October 26, 2021, actor Shawn-Caulin Young filed a grievance against stunt coordinator and second unit director Allan Graf. In his complaint, Young said Graf did not properly supervise the stunts in the film and that he was "hostile on set". He also said the production did not give him suitable protective gear for his eyes and ears when using pyrotechnics and explosives. During the shooting of a scene, Young was asked to serve as a "target" and was hit in the face with shrapnel and gunpowder debris. As a result of the scene, he and a camera operator became upset and were later "publicly shamed". At one point, Young said he overheard Graf calling him a "pussy". Producer Carolyn McMaster and first assistant director Scott Corban Sikman have both disputed the allegations.

Sikman said every member of the cast and crew was offered safety glasses and ear protection. When asked about the scene, Sikman said that Young and the camera operator were moved after the pair were hit with debris. Armorer John Farner only recalled the camera operator complaining about the incident but not Young. Furthermore, two anonymous crew members described the set as "unnerving" after blanks were fired at the floorboards of the set to create smoke; Farner said he was told by Graf that it was common practice to do so. In a statement, the production said Young had worked on the set for only one day—August 2, 2021—and that they "strongly deny any allegation that safety requirements were not fully met and adhered to at all times." According to Young, he was supposed to work for two days but was not brought back on set after asking for a pay raise; McMaster also disputed this claim.

== Release ==
Dead for a Dollar premiered out of competition at the 79th Venice International Film Festival on September 6, 2022. It was released in theaters on September 30, 2022, in the United States and Canada by Quiver Distribution, and internationally by Myriad Pictures. Its release on Blu-ray and DVD was on October 4, 2022.

== Reception ==
On the review aggregator website Rotten Tomatoes, 54% of 57 critics' reviews are positive, with an average rating of 5.5/10. The website's consensus reads: "There are certainly worse Westerns, but with Walter Hill behind the camera and a killer cast reporting for duty, Dead for a Dollar should have higher entertainment value." Metacritic, which uses a weighted average, assigned the film a score of 61 out of 100, based on 17 critics, indicating "generally favorable" reviews.
