= The Call (2013 film) =

- Theatrical release poster
- Directed by: Brad Anderson
- Screenplay by: Richard D'Ovidio
- Story by: Richard D'Ovidio; Nicole D'Ovidio; Jon Bokenkamp
- Produced by: Jeff Graup; Michael Luisi; Michael A. Helfant; Robert L. Stein; Bradley Gallo
- Starring: Halle Berry; Abigail Breslin; Morris Chestnut; Michael Eklund; Michael Imperioli
- Cinematography: Thomas Yatsko
- Edited by: Avi Youabian
- Music by: John Debney
- Production companies: TriStar Pictures; Stage 6 Films; Troika Pictures; WWE Studios; Amasia Entertainment; Apotheosis Media Group
- Distributed by: Sony Pictures Releasing
- Release date: March 15, 2013
- Running time: 94 minutes
- Country: United States
- Language: English
- Budget: $13 million
- Box office: $68.5 million

The Call is a 2013 American crime thriller film directed by Brad Anderson and written by Richard D'Ovidio. The film stars Abigail Breslin as Casey Welson, a teenage girl kidnapped by a mysterious serial killer and Halle Berry as Jordan Turner, a 9-1-1 operator, still suffering emotionally from a prior botched 9-1-1 call, who receives Casey's call. Morris Chestnut, Michael Eklund, Michael Imperioli, and David Otunga also star. The story was originally envisioned as a television series, but D'Ovidio later rewrote it as a film. Filming began in July 2012 and spanned a period of 25 days, with all scenes being shot in California, mainly Burbank and Santa Clarita.

A screening of The Call was held at the Women's International Film Festival hosted at the Regal South Beach theater on February 26, 2013. TriStar Pictures released it to theatres on March 15, 2013. Considered to be high-concept by many reviewers, the film proved a commercial success, grossing over $68 million against a budget of $13 million. Halle Berry was nominated for Choice Movie Actress in a Drama at the Teen Choice Awards and Best Actress at the BET Awards while Michael Eklund won Best Supporting Performance by a Male in a Motion Picture at the Leo Awards. Critics gave the film mixed reviews, but praised Berry and Breslin's performances and the film's suspense. It is currently the most successful WWE produced film.

== Plot ==
Seasoned 9-1-1 operator Jordan Turner receives a call from 15-year-old Leah Templeton, fearing for her life as a man breaks into her home while her parents are away. Jordan calmly advises her to hide, which she does under the bed. After the intruder has searched the room thinking Leah has left, he proceeds to leave the house. The girl believes he has left, but when her call is disconnected, Jordan calls back, and the ring gives Leah's location away to the intruder. After the male intruder captures Leah, Jordan attempts to dissuade him, but he responds, "It's already done," and hangs up. The next day, a television report confirms that Leah has been murdered. Emotionally affected, Jordan decides she can no longer handle field calls.

Six months later, Jordan is training 9-1-1 operators. Teenager Casey Welson, after heading home from the Mall, is almost hit by a car in the parking garage. The driver apologises but then assaults her and throws her into the trunk of his car. Kidnapped, Casey uses a disposable phone to call 9-1-1. Brooke, a rookie operator, receives the call but can't handle it, so Jordan takes over. However, since Casey is using a burner phone, her exact location cannot be determined by GPS.

As the kidnapper drives, Jordan gets Casey to provide details about the man who abducted her and the colour of the car which she describes as a red/maroon 4 door car. Jordan gets her to knock off the tail light and wave to signal an incoming car. While waving, a woman driving behind sees Casey's arm, and calls 9-1-1 on a phone with GPS. With her disclosure of the location, Jordan shares the location to the police. The woman drives near the kidnapper’s car and tells 9-1-1 the plate number of the car, but it comes up as a stolen plate. While Jordan is questioning further, the woman overtakes the vehicle and looks at the kidnapper to get a description of him, but this spooks him and he abruptly exits the highway. The woman provides the road he took to Jordan. When Casey discovers paint in the trunk, Jordan has her pour the paint out of the tail-light hole to help police with tracking the car. The paint pouring attracts the attention of another driver, Alan Denado, but the kidnapper viciously bludgeons him into unconsciousness with a shovel and, assuming him to be dead, stuffs him into the trunk of his car, a black Lincoln Town Car Signature Limited, with Casey.

On the road again, Alan awakens in his trunk and begins panicking. Hearing his screams, the kidnapper pulls over and kills him. When he later stops for gas, Casey tries to crawl out of the trunk into the back seat and yell for help. When a gas attendant sees her and tries to open the car door, the kidnapper douses him with gasoline and burns him alive. Meanwhile, the police find the kidnapper's abandoned car, a red Toyota Camry LE in a parking lot off a nearby highway and, using fingerprints left at the scene, discover the kidnapper's identity, Michael Foster.

Arriving at their destination, Michael removes Casey from the trunk. He finds the phone in her pocket, still connected to 9-1-1. Jordan informs Michael that the police have discovered his identity and have enough evidence to charge him for his crimes, advising him to surrender and to not hurt Casey. Before smashing the phone, Michael responds, "It's already done,” making Jordan realise that Michael was also behind Leah’s death.

Meanwhile, Jordan’s boyfriend, police officer Paul Phillips, and others raid Michael's home, finding only his wife and children. When an officer finds a photo of Michael and his sister, Melinda, Paul notices Casey's physical resemblance. Additionally, their childhood home is revealed by Michael's wife to have burned down, although a nearby cottage, which police later raid but then find it empty, still remains.

As Michael begins to torture Casey, now restrained to a foldable wheelchair and subjected to nitrous oxide, she manages to spray him in the eyes and escape, but is later recaptured after being horrified by what she finds in another room. Determined to rescue her, Jordan drives to the cottage where she finds a number of photos of Michael with his leukemia-stricken sister. Stepping outside, she recognises sounds from an outdoor flagpole — exactly what she'd heard in the background at the end of the 9-1-1 call. Next to the flagpole, she also finds a trap door where the primary house once stood. Jordan accidentally drops her cell phone down the cellar and climbs down to get it.

Jordan hides from Michael in the cellar. Looking around, it becomes clear Michael had incestuous feelings towards his sister and was distraught when she fell ill and died. Michael keeps a prop head which he treats as his sister. He has been killing and scalping people similar to her since then, trying to find scalps that match his sister's hair, which she lost from chemotherapy.

Jordan soon finds Casey strapped to the wheelchair and attacks Michael as he begins to scalp Casey’s forehead. Jordan frees her and they try to escape, during which Casey stabs Michael in the back with scissors. Removing the scissors to hurt Casey, Jordan and Casey kick him back down into the cellar, knocking him unconscious. Instead of calling 9-1-1, they tape him to the same chair he used to torture Casey. When Michael regains consciousness, the women reveal that they intend to leave him there to die. Casey will claim she blacked out and escaped, and Jordan found her in the woods, while everyone will assume that Michael has fled. He first insults them, then pleads that they cannot do this to him. Jordan replies with his own words, "It's already done," and locks the door as Michael screams in horror.

== Cast ==
- Halle Berry as Jordan Turner, a 9-1-1 operator
- Abigail Breslin as Casey Welson, a kidnapped teenager
- Morris Chestnut as Officer Paul Phillips, Jordan's boyfriend
- Michael Eklund as Michael Foster, Casey's kidnapper and Leah Templeton's killer
- Michael Imperioli as Alan Denado, Michael's victim
- David Otunga as Officer Jake Devan
- Justina Machado as Rachel
- José Zúñiga as Marco
- Roma Maffia as Maddy
- Evie Thompson as Leah Templeton
- Denise Dowse as Flora
- Ella Rae Peck as Autumn
- Jenna Lamia as Brooke
- Ross Gallo as Josh
- Shawnee Badger as Melinda Foster
- Tara Platt as Female Trainee

== Production ==
=== Writing and casting ===
"I thought, 'That's a world we've never seen before in a film.' You never get to see the other side of it. [They were playing some actual calls on the news segment, and] listening to the calls, I got a chill up my spine as I envisioned what was going on [on the other end of the phone], and I thought that it would be a great world to play into."

— Screenwriter Richard D'Ovidio on the radio segment that led him to write the screenplay for The Call

Screenwriter Richard D'Ovidio was inspired to script the story after his wife heard an NPR segment with a 9-1-1 operator discussing her job. He began to research the subject and visited the Los Angeles Metropolitan Communications Dispatch Center (MCDC). Finding the center, which has backup generators, bulletproof windows, and a moat surrounding the building, to be "pretty amazing," he decided to shed light on what he viewed as a previously overlooked occupation. The story was originally conceptualized as a television series titled The Hive (a reference to the constant calls and conversations sounding like bees buzzing), but D'Ovidio decided to redraft it as a film on realizing that "the operators couldn't be the ones kicking in doors and going out into the field" all the time. As a result, what was planned to be the pilot episode was expanded and revised as a movie.

For most of the film, Berry's character, Turner, the 9-1-1 operator, does stay inside "the hive" before becoming actively involved in the search for Breslin's character, Welson, the kidnapped caller. D'Ovidio chose two female leads, explaining, "I wanted strong women... I think it was appropriate here, since most 911 call operators are women." Berry remarked, "I love the idea of being a part of a movie that was so empowering for women. We don't often get to play roles like this, where ordinary people become heroic and do something extraordinary." D'Ovidio chose to tell the story from the perspective of two characters—the operator and the caller—believing that it would become repetitive if it focused on only one. As a result, he switched perspectives every ten pages when writing the screenplay. As well as collaborating on the story with his wife, Nicole and Jon Bokenkamp, he accepted suggestions from Berry, Breslin and Eklund: "Halle came in with some great notes and Abigail and Michael and it started to flesh things out. I'm not one to say 'no' to a great suggested line of dialogue. It just makes me look better as a writer! I feel it's a very collaborative process, and some of the happiest accidents happen when you just listen to people. When someone comes up to you and says, 'Why don't we do it this way?' I think that it's important to listen."

Chestnut, who plays Phillips, a police officer and Turner's boyfriend, prepared by riding along with Los Angeles police officers to observe what it is like to be an officer in a squad car and Berry prepared for the role by visiting a call center and observing the operators at work. She told a Miami Herald interviewer, "You get a different perspective by doing research... You can't know what its like to be a cop even though you've seen it in the movies. But nobody ever saw a 9-1-1 center. I thought they lived in the ground somewhere! It was interesting to see who they were and how they deal and how stressful it can be. I was a wreck watching them. They would just be as cool as can be doing their thing. I thought, 'I could never do this job.'"

=== Filming ===
Producers scheduled for The Call to be filmed in Canada in June 2011 after they failed to make the cut for a California tax credit. With a low budget of $13 million, they settled on Ottawa, Ontario, where director Anderson had just finished another project. However, the California Film Commission (CFC) called back nine months later and informed them that the waiting list had been largely cleared and that they now qualified for $1.9 million in tax deduction. According to Producer Michael Helfant, they were "literally days from starting to put down a deposit." Berry was reportedly pleased with the news, wanting to stay in Los Angeles and the CFC helped secure film locations for the project.

With a crew of roughly 120 persons, filming took a total of 25 days, spanning from July to August 2012. Car chase scenes were shot at Long Beach and a Westlake Village office building was modeled as the emergency dispatch center. The latter was also used for the scenes in which Welson is locked in the trunk of a car. Other filming locations include the Burbank Town Center on Magnolia Boulevard in Burbank, California, Santa Clarita, California and the 170 Highway. At one point, Berry was rushed to Cedars-Sinai Medical Center after falling headfirst on concrete while shooting a fight sequence. A spokesperson for Berry confirmed that she suffered a minor head injury and was taken to the hospital as a precaution, but she checked out healthy and was released.

Berry told interviewer Kimberly Grant, "The hard part for me was to try to stay connected to Phillips and Welson." This was because, Grant writes, "she had to spend an entire day reading 21 pages of dialogue, rattling off in quick succession 911-operator jargon, that would be cut and edited to fit the film... In film terms, that means Berry performed for 21 minutes straight with no breaks, not an easy feat for any actor." Though she enjoyed working with Chestnut, Berry told Grant that it was difficult being unable to see her co-stars for most of the film: "That was my constant challenge; to stay on such an emotional level [as Jordan], so that I would be on the same level as they [i.e., Casey and Officer Phillips] were. I used that feeling of frustration and of being stuck to fuel my character."

=== Music ===
The score of the film is composed by John Debney. Unlike the other films he composed with an orchestra, the film's score is completely filled with dark and intense electronic and synthesized elements although he used little orchestral elements in the score.

== Promotion and release ==
Sony Pictures Worldwide Acquisitions paid very little money to acquire U.S. distribution rights. But the film screened for a test audience in November 2012 and scores were even higher than anticipated, prompting Sony to give the film a wide theatrical release.

Spanning 94 minutes upon completion, the movie received an R rating for violence, disturbing content and some language. Berry and Chestnut promoted the film at the ShowPlace ICON movie theater at the red-carpet premiere in Chicago on February 28. Berry also traveled to Rio to promote The Call in anticipation of its April 12 release in Brazil.

The Women's International Film Festival hosted a screening of The Call at the Regal South Beach theater on February 26, 2013. Chestnut told the audience that he would sign on for a sequel, saying about Berry, "I didn't get to kiss this woman enough!" Berry added, "I'm in the movie and even I was scared."

=== Home media ===
The film was released in theatres on March 15 and on DVD and Blu-ray on June 25 of that same year. DVD extras included a featurette entitled "Emergency Procedure: Making the Film" and commentary from Abigail Breslin, Halle Berry, and other filmmakers. The Blu-ray version came with more features, including deleted scenes, an alternate ending, Michael Eklund's audition tape, featurettes entitled "A Set Tour of The Hive and The Lair" and "Inside the Stunts", as well as all of the original DVD content.

== Reception ==
=== Box office ===
According to Boxoffice, The Call was expected to earn about $11–12 million on its opening weekend in 2,507 theaters across the United States but surpassed this by a significant margin and grossed $17 million in its first three days. This indicated good profits, as the film cost about $13 million to produce and Sony paid a much smaller amount to acquire U.S. distribution rights. With box office takings of over $68 million, The Call is WWE Studios' most commercially successful film to date, the previous top-grossing productions being See No Evil, which stars professional wrestler Kane (Glenn Jacobs) ($19 million) and 12 Rounds, which stars professional wrestler John Cena ($17 million).

Critics were surprised by the movie's box office success because "Berry hadn't had a hit in a number of years" and because the R rating narrowed down the audience. WWE Studios head Michael Luisi commented that The Call "[exceeded] our most optimistic forecasts."

=== Critical response ===
On the review aggregator website Rotten Tomatoes, 44% of 131 critics' reviews are positive, with an average rating of 5.2/10. The website's consensus reads: "The Call builds plenty of suspense before taking a problematic turn in the third act." Metacritic, which uses a weighted average, assigned the film a score of 51 out of 100, based on 23 critics, indicating "mixed or average" reviews. Audiences polled by CinemaScore gave the film an average grade of "B+" on an A+ to F scale.

Entertainment Weekly gave the film a B rating, saying that the tale "is surprisingly good and surprisingly gruesome fun. Eklund makes the most of the maniac role and Breslin is a sympathetic victim." Reviewer Dwight Brown wrote, "The script gives Berry a blue-collar character she can make accessible, vulnerable and gutsy... Chestnut is suitably gallant and stalwart as her caring lover and a cop on a mission... This film is a whole lot scarier than you think it's going to be." Manohla Dargis of The New York Times wrote, "An effectively creepy thriller about a 911 operator and a young miss in peril, The Call is a model of low-budget filmmaking." She praised its "clean, clever premise" and said that Berry's Jordan is "an old-fashioned hero in many respects, so it's fitting that Mr. Anderson uses old-fashioned filmmaking techniques, like crosscutting, to build tension and old-school exploitation tricks like evil to justify taking the story dark and then dark and bonkers."

A reviewer for The Hutchinson News, Jake Coyle, commented, "Director Brad Anderson... working from the simple, high-concept screenplay by Richard D'Ovidio, ably cuts between Berry's increasingly emotionally-attached Jordan Turner and Breslin's panicking Casey Welson, contrasting the fraught strategizing of Turner with the frantic police pursuit of the kidnapper." Coyle stated that "The Call dials up a shallow thrill ride, but one efficiently peppered with your typical 'don't go in there!' moments," but concluded, "The Call is a rudimentary, almost old-fashioned 90-minute escape that manages to achieve its low ambitions." Rating the film two stars out of four, Coyle writes that once the film "manages to build some suspense from the trunk of the car-- the clever attempts to elicit help, the dwindling cell phone battery-- its deficiencies become less forgivable once the action turns off the road."

Roger Moore of The Seattle Times showed mixed feelings in his review: "Rare is the thriller that goes as completely and utterly wrong as The Call does at almost precisely the one-hour mark. Which is a crying shame, because for an hour this is a riveting, by-the-book kidnapping." Moore explained what he saw as the highs and lows: "Brad Anderson turns this...serial-killer hunt...into a real edge-of-your-seat thriller. Given...a half-decent tale of horror, guilt, problem-solving and redemption, Anderson couldn't go far wrong," but, Moore states, "It's only when our Oscar-winning heroine puts down the phone and sets out to do some sleuthing of her own that The Call disconnects, turning into something far more generic and far less exciting." The Los Angeles Times turned in a similar review: "The semi-fresh thriller, set mainly in an emergency call center and on the freeways of Los Angeles, puts a tech slant on a damsel-in-distress setup. It buzzes along for a while, the promising plot innovations inviting suspension of disbelief, before by-the-numbers implausibility, over-the-top valor and unsavory contrivances take over and the line goes dead."

=== Accolades ===
Berry was nominated for two awards for her role as Turner in The Call in 2013. She was nominated for Best Actress at the BET Awards, but lost to Kerry Washington for her role in Django Unchained. She was also nominated for Choice Movie Actress in a Drama at the Teen Choice Awards, but lost to Emma Watson for The Perks of Being a Wallflower.

The film was also nominated for Best Thriller Film at the 40th Saturn Awards and Berry was nominated for Saturn Award for Best Actress, but lost to World War Z and Sandra Bullock, respectively.

=== 2022 resurgence ===
On April 10, 2022, close to a decade after its theatrical release, the film was added to the streaming platform, Netflix. By April 11, 2022, it was the most popular film on the platform. The film surged to #1 on Netflix and on April 13, 2022, both Halle Berry and Michael Eklund addressed its resurgence with fans on social media. Berry jokingly tweeted to fans asking "Are y'all Ok?" while Eklund tweeted that he was "glad you all still enjoy it".

== See also ==
- List of films featuring psychopaths and sociopaths
- List of films featuring home invasions
