= Isabelle (2018 film) =

2018 Canadian-American horror film

- Film poster
- Directed by: Robert Heydon
- Written by: Donald Martin
- Produced by: Robert Heydon
- Starring: Adam Brody; Amanda Crew
- Cinematography: Pasha Patriki
- Edited by: Diane Brunjes
- Music by: Mark Korven
- Production companies: Rob Heydon Productions; Out of the Blue Entertainment; Kidlat Entertainment
- Distributed by: Vertical Entertainment
- Release dates: October 2018 (Busan); May 24, 2019 (limited)
- Running time: 80 minutes
- Countries: United States; Canada
- Language: English
- Box office: $386,250

Isabelle is a 2018 horror film directed by Robert Heydon and starring Adam Brody and Amanda Crew.

== Plot ==
A young couple's dream of starting a family is shattered as they descend into the depths of paranoia and must fight to survive an evil presence that wants nothing more than their own lives.

== Cast ==
- Adam Brody as Matt Kane
- Amanda Crew as Larissa Kane
- Zoe Belkin as Isabelle Pelway
- Mark Winnick as Officer Steve Murray
- Sheila McCarthy as Ann Pelway
- Booth Savage as Clifford Kane
- Dayo Ade as Father Lopez
- Michael Miranda as Pedro Salazar
- Allison Brooks as Ruth Stanton
- Krista Bridges as Jessica
- David Tompa as Dr. Karl Neidorf
- Zoe Doyle as Dr. Phoebe Chan
- John Healy as Det. John Smith

== Release ==
The film had its worldwide premiere at the Busan International Film Festival in October 2018. Then it was released in limited theaters and video-on-demand on May 24, 2019.

== Reception ==
On the review aggregator website Rotten Tomatoes, 7% of 15 critics' reviews are positive, with an average rating of 3.8/10.
