= Howard Klausner =

American filmmaker

Howard Klausner, known also as Howie Klausner, is an American filmmaker and writer, known for writing the script for the 2000 film Space Cowboys.

== Filmography ==
=== As script writer ===
- Weird Science (1997, for the episode "The Genie Detective")
- Space Cowboys (2000)
- Dirty Harry: The Original (2001, documentary short)
- The Grace Card (2010, also producer)
- The Last Ride (2011)
- The Identical (2014)
- Hoovey (2015, also producer)
- Reagan (2024)

=== As director ===
- Outlaw Dreams (2008, also script writer and producer)
- The Secret Handshake (2015, also writer and producer)
