= Errors of the Human Body =

- Movie Poster 2012
- Directed by: Eron Sheean
- Written by: Shane Danielsen; Eron Sheean
- Produced by: Darryn Welch; Mike Dehghan; Cole Payne; Sam Horton; Josie Horton; Joel A. Miller
- Starring: Michael Eklund; Karoline Herfurth; Tómas Lemarquis; Rik Mayall
- Cinematography: Anna Howard
- Edited by: Patrick Wilfert
- Music by: Anthony Pateras
- Production companies: Instinctive Film; XYZ Films; High5Films; Kurt Media
- Distributed by: IFC Films (USA) (theatrical); Pandastorm Pictures (Germany); XYZ Films (worldwide)
- Release dates: July 28, 2012 (Fantasia Festival); April 19, 2013 (U.S.)
- Running time: 100 minutes
- Countries: Germany; United States
- Language: English
- Budget: $1.9 million

Errors of the Human Body is a 2012 psychological thriller directed by Eron Sheean and starring Michael Eklund.

== Plot ==
Dr. Geoff Burton (Eklund), a brilliant genetics researcher, is invited to a lab in Dresden, only to discover a lethal virus is being created, which he may have unintentionally caused, and becomes its first victim. This mystery is set against Dr. Burton trying to find redemption and peace from a past haunted by the death of his infant son.

== Cast ==
- Michael Eklund as Geoffrey Burton
- Karoline Herfurth as Rebekka Fiedler
- Tómas Lemarquis as Jarek Novak
- Rik Mayall as Samuel Mead
- Caroline Gerdolle as Sarah Burton
- Yusuke Yamasaki as Chiba
- Ulrich Meinecke as Waldemar
- Iván González as Miguel
- Usha Rani as Sunny
- Vincent De Ville as Dr. Kovak
- Christian Mock as Train Inspector
- Sienna Farrell as Voice Over Artist

== Background ==
While showing a short film at Berlinale in 2006, Sheean met a scientist from the Max Planck Institute of Molecular Cell Biology and Genetics, the brother of cinematographer Anna Howard, who became director of photography on the film. He developed the feature while serving as an artist in residency for over six years at the institute in Dresden. Sheean said in an interview, "I managed to convince them to let me develop a feature film based around the institute and some of their bizarre and fascinating research projects. It's not a documentary – it's a fiction film with some real science as the jumping-off point for the story."

== Release and reception ==
After having its world premiere at Fantasia Festival in Montreal in July 2012, the film had its U.S. premiere in September at Fantastic Fest in Austin. It was also selected at the Melbourne International Film Festival, International Film Festival Rotterdam, Miami International Film Festival, International Film Festival Phoenix, Frightfest London, Transatlantyk - Poznań International Film and Music Festival, Telluride Horror Show and Rio de Janeiro International Film Festival. In September 2012, Jeff Deutchman from Sundance Selects/IFC negotiated with Nate Bolotin at XYZ Films for the North American rights to distribute the film.

During its tour of the festival circuit, the film received mostly positive reviews, especially around Eklund's performance. Gabriel Ruzin of Screen Invasion wrote, "Errors of the Human Body is elevated by a sublime turn by star Michael Eklund... His agony, particularly in the third act, is brilliantly painful. Despite the screenplay skimming over his character's supposed scientific prowess, to the film's moderate detriment, Eklund's powerful performance is nonetheless tragic and captivating." Michael Treveloni of Film School Rejects noted, "The film is not just a science-fiction horror story: it is a commentary on the importance of dialog, showcasing the need for communication in its many forms. With Geoff, Errors presents the perfect, damaged subject." At the Fantastic Fest screening, Sheean himself said, "The film is about a breakdown in communication, both on the surface in the characters and internally with the cells."

== Awards ==
- Fantastic Fest Next Wave Spotlight Competition – Michael Eklund for Best Actor
- LEO Awards 2013 - Best Lead Performance by a Male in a Feature Length Drama: Michael Eklund
- Trieste Science+Fiction Festival – Asteroid Award Best Film
