= Some Other Woman =

2023 American thriller film

- Theatrical release poster
- Directed by: Joel David Moore
- Written by: Yuri Baranovsky; Angela Gulner; Josh Long
- Produced by: Joel David Moore
- Starring: Amanda Crew; Tom Felton; Ashley Greene; Brooke Lyons; Rick Fox
- Cinematography: Jean-Philippe Bernier
- Edited by: Megan Brooks; Cory Livingston
- Music by: Aaron Drake
- Production companies: Balcony 9 Productions; Productivity Media
- Distributed by: Radiant Films International
- Release dates: 3 March 2023 (Mammoth Film Festival); 5 January 2024 (United States)
- Running time: 85 minutes
- Country: United States
- Language: English

Some Other Woman is a 2023 American psychological thriller film produced and directed by Joel David Moore and written by Yuri Baranovsky, Angela Gulner, and Josh Long. The film stars Amanda Crew, Tom Felton and Ashley Greene.

== Plot ==
Eve Carver (Amanda Crew), a woman whisked away to a tropical island by her husband's work for what was only supposed to be a few months. But as the months turn to years, Eve is forced to give up her own dreams as the island fever grows stronger and stronger. Reality begins to unravel around her as she encounters a strange woman (Ashley Greene) who begins taking over her life, piece by piece.

== Cast ==
- Amanda Crew as Eve Carver
- Tom Felton as Peter
- Ashley Greene as Renata
- Rick Fox as Salvador Ranza
- Brooke Lyons as Chelsea Ranza

== Production ==
The script was written by Josh Long, Angela Gulner and Yuri Baranovsky.

== Release ==
Some Other Woman was released exclusively in Regal Cinemas on January 5, 2024.

== Reception ==
On the review aggregator website Rotten Tomatoes, 43% of seven critics' reviews are positive.

Courtney Small of Exclaim! wrote that "Moore clearly knows how to create an eerie atmosphere, and his cast does their best with what they're given, but neither can overcome the film's lacklustre and muddled script." Liz Braun of Original Cin gave the film a "C" rating, criticizing its plot which she described as confusing. Rachel West, writing for That Shelf, gave the film a more positive review in which she praised its cast and the script's twists.
