= Philip DeWilde =

Canadian film and television actor

- Born: July 10, 1972; Toronto, Ontario, Canada
- Died: July 9, 2014 (aged 41); St. Petersburg, Florida, U.S.
- Occupation: Actor
- Years active: 1992-2014

Philip DeWilde (July 10, 1972 – July 9, 2014) was a Canadian film and television actor.

== Early life ==
DeWilde was born in Toronto, Ontario, Canada on July 10, 1972.

== Career ==
He was most noted for his role in the film Turning Paige, for which he garnered a Genie Award nomination for Best Actor at the 23rd Genie Awards. His other credits included supporting and guest roles in the television series Mythic Warriors, RoboCop: Prime Directives and Mutant X, and the films Prince Charming, Don't Say a Word and Dawn of the Dead.

== Personal life ==
On summer vacation, DeWilde spent the weekend on a vacation to St. Petersburg, Florida. However, he contracted a serious ailment and was taken to the hospital. DeWilde died on July 9, 2014, in St. Petersburg, Florida, one day before his 42nd birthday.

== Filmography ==
=== Film ===
Year	Title	Role	Notes
1995	National Lampoon's Senior Trip	Teen Boy in Film	
1998	Airborne	Video Technician #1	
1999	Judgment Day: The Ellie Nesler Story	Camp Counsellor	
2001	Don't Say a Word	Intern	
2001	Turning Paige	Trevor Fleming	
2004	Dawn of the Dead	EMS Technician	
2013	Murder on Frog Pond Drive	Arnold	

=== Television ===
Year	Title	Role	Notes
1995	Where's the Money, Noreen?	Teddy Lookalike	Television film
1996	Kung Fu: The Legend Continues	Cadet Rutherford	Episode: "Special Forces"
1997	Peacekeepers	Privak	Television film
1998	The Last Don II	Claudia's Assistant	Episode #1.1
1999	Cruel Justice	Roadie	Television film
1999	Mythic Warriors	Cadmus	Episode: "Cadmus and Europa"
2001	RoboCop: Prime Directives	Meeker	4 episodes
2001	Prince Charming	Delivery Boy	Television film
2001	The Defectors	Rick	Television film
2002	Earth: Final Conflict	Reporter	Episode: "Legacy"
2002	Beyblade	Net	Episode: "Itzy Bey-Itzy Spider"
2002	The Rats	Artie	Television film
2004	Mutant X	Nathan Reynolds	Episode: "The Prophecy"
2015	Bloodline	Ronald Stoltz	Episode: "Part 4"
