= The Identical =

- Theatrical release poster
- Directed by: Dustin Marcellino
- Written by: Howard Klausner
- Produced by: Howard Klausner; Dustin Marcellino; Joe McDougall; Matt Russell; Coke Sams; Clio Tegel
- Starring: Erin Cottrell; Amanda Crew; Brian Geraghty; Seth Green; Ashley Judd; Joe Pantoliano; Blake Rayne; Ray Liotta
- Cinematography: Karl Walter Lindenlaub
- Edited by: Rick Shaine
- Music by: Klaus Badelt; Christopher Carmichael; Jerry Marcellino; Yochanan Marcellino
- Production companies: City of Peace Films; Identical Production Company
- Distributed by: Freestyle Releasing
- Release dates: April 17, 2014 (Nashville Film Festival); September 5, 2014 (United States)
- Running time: 107 minutes
- Country: United States
- Language: English
- Budget: $16 million
- Box office: $2.8 million

The Identical is a 2014 American musical drama film directed by Dustin Marcellino and written by Howard Klausner. The film was released theatrically in the United States on September 5, 2014. It was universally panned by both critics and audiences, and only grossed $2.8 million on a $16 million budget.

== Plot ==
After Helen and William Hemsley give birth to identical twin boys, the brothers are separated at birth during the Great Depression. Drexel Hemsley becomes an iconic 1950s rock and roll star, while Ryan Wade, born Dexter Hemsley, struggles to balance his love for music with pleasing his father. The Reverend Reece Wade and his wife Louise are sure that their adopted son has been gifted and called by God to be a preacher.

However, Ryan challenges his parents' vision for his life, and unflinchingly chooses to launch his own music career with his best friend Dino. Encouraged by his wife Jenny and employer Avi, Ryan embarks on an unpredictable, provocative path – performing the legendary music of Drexel Hemsley in sold-out venues across the country. As the brothers' destinies intertwine, Ryan discovers that Drexel is his long-lost twin brother.

== Cast ==
- Blake Rayne as Drexel Hemsley and Dexter Hemsley / Ryan Wade
  - Noah Urrea as Dexter / Ryan at age 9
- Ray Liotta as Reece Wade
- Ashley Judd as Louise Wade
- Seth Green as Dino
  - Ian Mitchell as 9-year-old Dino
- Joe Pantoliano as Avi Hirshberg
- Brian Geraghty as William Hemsley
  - Chris Mulkey as Old William
- Amanda Crew as Helen Hemsley
- Waylon Payne as Tony Nash
- Danny Woodburn as Damon

== Release ==
=== Critical reception ===
The Identical was universally panned by critics. On Rotten Tomatoes, the film holds a rating of 6%, based on 62 reviews, with an average rating of 3.3/10. The site's consensus states: "With nearly every element ringing as hollow as the ersatz Elvis at the story's core, The Identical looks destined for a bright future on the ironic viewing circuit." On Metacritic, the film has a score of 25 out of 100, based on 25 critics, indicating "generally unfavorable reviews".

Randy Cordova wrote in The Arizona Republic: "Elvis Presley made some bad movies, but let's give the King his due: He never made anything as outright awful as The Identical."

Quad-City Times film critic Linda Cook wrote: "Fans of bad movies, please note: This is a must-see. This is so bad it must be seen to be believed — "Showgirls" bad, a vision that slowly goes wrong, then terribly wrong, then hits disaster levels. In a sense, it's an Ed Wood-ian exercise in wrong."

=== Box office ===
The Identical grossed $1.6 million in its opening weekend, finishing in 12th place at the box office.

The film was pulled from theaters after playing for only three weeks, during which it grossed $2.8 million, far below its $16-million budget, making it a box office bomb.
