= The Last Ride (2011 film) =

- Film poster
- Directed by: Harry Thomason
- Written by: Howard Klausner; Dub Cornett
- Produced by: Benjy Gaither; Doug Jackson; Harry Thomason; Dub Cornett
- Starring: Henry Thomas; Jesse James; Fred Dalton Thompson; Kaley Cuoco
- Cinematography: Jim Roberson
- Edited by: Leo Papin
- Music by: Benjy Gaither
- Production company: Mozark Productions
- Distributed by: Category One Entertainment Group
- Release date: October 21, 2011
- Running time: 104 minutes
- Country: United States
- Language: English
- Box office: $27,000

The Last Ride is a 2011 American drama about the last days of country music pioneer and legend Hank Williams. The film stars Henry Thomas, Jesse James, and Fred Dalton Thompson, and received a limited release on October 21, 2011.

Despite the content, no recordings by Williams are ever played during the film. The soundtrack is composed of covers of Williams' songs among other country musicians.

== Plot ==
The film centers around the final days of Hank Williams' life when he was being driven by a young auto mechanic to his New Year's Eve shows in West Virginia and Ohio. The film chronicles their relations, their adventures, and Williams' personal problems, which later resulted in his death on January 1, 1953.

== Principal Cast ==
- Henry Thomas as Hank Williams/"Mr. Wells"/Luke
- Jesse James as Silas
- Fred Thompson as O'Keefe
- Kaley Cuoco as Wanda
- Stephen Tobolowsky as Ray
- Ray McKinnon as Stan
- James Hampton as Judge Matheny

== Soundtrack ==
The soundtrack was released under Curb Records, the company that also employed Williams' son Hank Williams, Jr. and his grandson Hank Williams III up until 2011.

- The Last Ride Theme – Benjy Gaither
- Hey Good Lookin' – Jett Williams
- Honky Tonk Man – Russ Taff
- Keep on the Sunny Side – Rebecca Frazier
- I Will Marry You – Wes Hampton
- It Wasn't God Who Made Honky Tonk Angels – Sarah Johns
- Cold, Cold Heart – Doug Anderson
- The Swing Low Sweet Chariot – Clyde Wright & The Incredible Golden Gates
- I'm So Lonesome I Could Cry – Michael English
- Longing – Jett Williams
- Footprints – Benjy Gaither
- I'm Winging My Way Back Home – The Blackwood Brothers
- Can't Help It If I'm Still in Love with You – Jett Williams
- On I Down the Road – Val Storey
- Chino – Nathan Young
- Ilene – Nathan Young
- What Ya Gonna Do – Nathan Young
- Tennessee Waltz – Nathan Young
- O Come Angel Band – The Isaacs
- Hank Williams' Blues – Jett Williams
- The Night Hank Williams Came to Town – Johnny Cash & Waylon Jennings
- The Last Ride – Tony Ramey

== Reception ==
On review aggregator Rotten Tomatoes, the film holds an approval rating of 47% based on 19 reviews, with an average rating of 5.48/10.
