= Amanda Crew =

Canadian actress (born 1986)

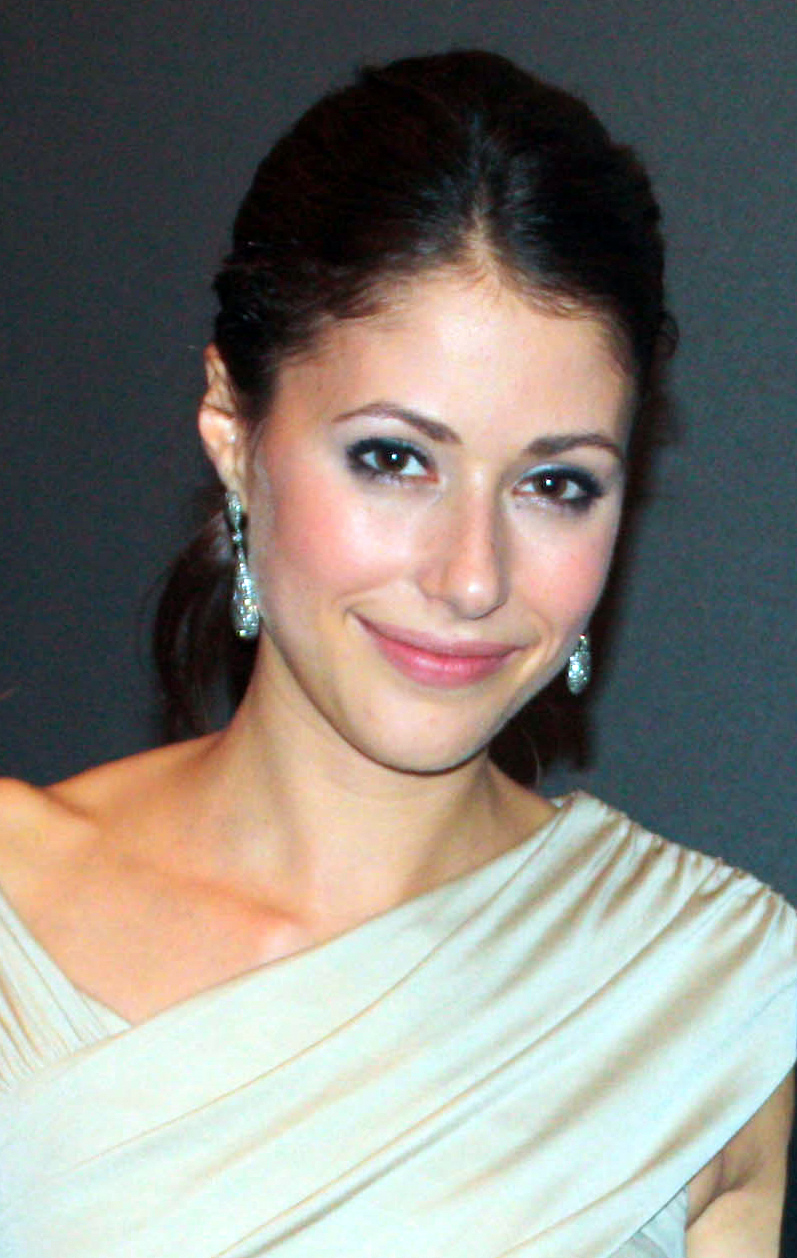
- Crew in 2010
- Born: June 5, 1986 (age 40); Langley, British Columbia, Canada
- Occupation: Actress
- Years active: 2005–present
- Spouse: Dustin Milligan

Amanda Crew (born June 5, 1986) is a Canadian actress. Following her film debut in Final Destination 3 (2006), Crew had lead roles in films such as Sex Drive (2008), Charlie St. Cloud, Repeaters (both 2010), Charlie Zone (2011), Crazy Kind of Love, Ferocious (both 2013), Chokeslam (2016), Tone-Deaf (2019), and Some Other Woman (2023), as well as supporting roles in The Haunting in Connecticut (2009), The Age of Adaline (2015), A Crooked Somebody (2017), Freaks (2018), and There's Something Wrong with the Children (2023).

On television, she is best known for her lead roles as Tanis McTaggart on the first and second seasons of the YTV teen sports drama series 15/Love (2005–2006), Carrie Miller on the CTV teen drama series Whistler (2006–2008) and Monica Hall on the HBO comedy series Silicon Valley (2014–2019).

== Early life ==
Amanda Crew was born in Langley, British Columbia. Her mother, Debbie Crew, is a legal secretary and her father, Ian Crew, is a telecom worker.

== Career ==
=== 2005–2013 ===
In 2005, at age 19, Crew landed her first onscreen acting role as Polly Brewer on the ABC teen drama Life as We Know It. She made a cameo appearance as a sorority sister in an episode of Smallville, a television series based on the DC Comics character Superman. From 2005 to 2006, she played Tanis McTaggart on the YTV teen drama 15/Love which co-starred actress and close friend Meaghan Rath. From 2006 to 2008, Crew played Carrie Miller on the CTV drama Whistler, for which she earned her first Leo award.

In 2006, she made her film debut in the supernatural horror Final Destination 3, the third installment in the Final Destination film series and the fourth chronologically. She played Julie Christensen, the younger sister of the film's protagonist Wendy. Crew had originally auditioned for the role of Erin Ulmer while Alexz Johnson auditioned for Julie, but ended up switching roles prior to filming. Despite mixed reviews from critics, the film was a commercial success, earning over $117 million at the box office worldwide. She made a cameo as a high school student in the romantic teen comedy John Tucker Must Die.

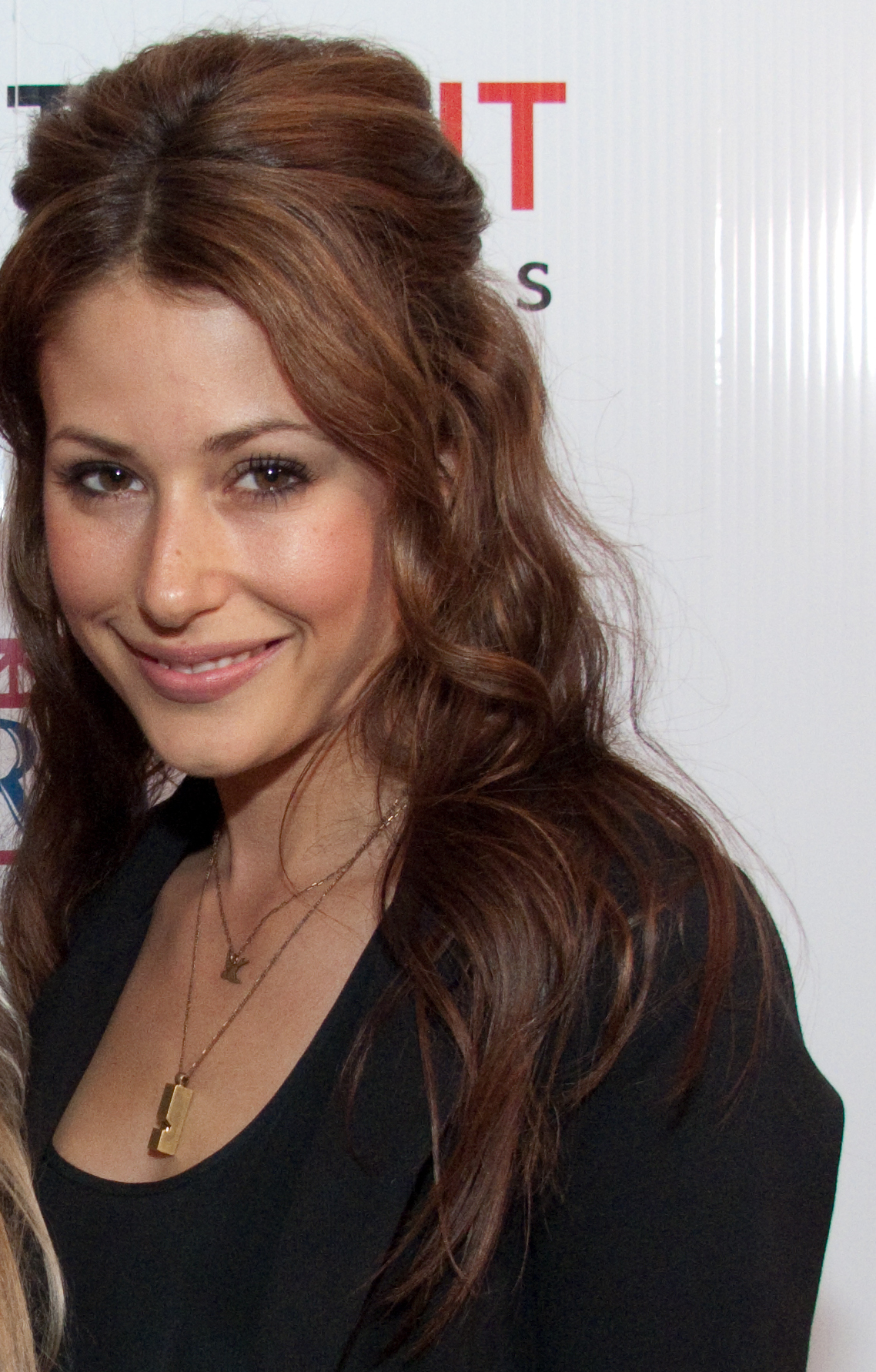
Amanda Crew in 2009

She later appeared in the romantic teen comedy She's the Man, a modern adaptation of William Shakespeare's Twelfth Night. She played Kia, a soccer player who helps her friend and teammate Viola Hastings (played by Amanda Bynes) pretend to be her brother in order to play on the boys' soccer team after their team gets cut by their misogynistic coach. In 2008, Crew landed her first lead role in the teen road comedy Sex Drive. She played Felicia Alpine, a high school student who goes on a road trip with her two best friends (played by Josh Zuckerman and Clark Duke).

She later starred as Marie in the romantic comedy That One Night, which premiered at the Omaha Film Festival on February 19, 2008. In 2009, she had a supporting role with Martin Donovan and Kyle Gallner in the supernatural horror The Haunting in Connecticut. Despite negative reviews from critics, the film opened in second place at the North American box office, ultimately grossing $77.5 million worldwide. She starred in the romantic comedy The Break-Up Artist as Britney, a breakup artist who becomes a matchmaker after her ex-boyfriend starts his own breakup company and steals her customers.

In 2010, Crew co-starred with Zac Efron and Kim Basinger in the supernatural romantic drama Charlie St. Cloud, playing the love interest of the titular character. Despite negative reviews, it proved to be Crew's mainstream breakthrough. Later that year, she starred in the sci-fi crime thriller Repeaters as Sonia Logan, a drug addict in rehab who becomes trapped in a time loop. The film premiered at the 2010 Toronto International Film Festival on September 13 and received negative reviews from critics. Despite this, the film was nominated for nine Leo Awards, including Best Lead Performance by a Female in a Motion Picture for Crew and Best Feature Length Film, losing the latter to Gunless.

In 2011, Crew starred in the crime thriller Charlie Zone as a heroin addicted single mother. After the film had its world premiere at the Atlantic Film Festival on September 16, 2011, the film was screened at the Vancouver International Film Festival on October 10, 2012. She later starred in the family drama Sisters & Brothers as Nikki, an aspiring actress who comes into conflict with her older half-sister. The film won six Leo Awards, including Best Feature Length Film, and Best Lead Performance by a Female in a Motion Picture for Crew.

Crew guest-starred on the USA Network legal drama Suits, as an expert hacker who has stolen money from her father's company. In 2012, Crew co-starred with an ensemble cast in the political thriller Knife Fight, playing a woman involved in an affair with Larry Becker (played by Eric McCormack). The film premiered at the Tribeca Film Festival on April 25, 2012. In 2013, Crew co-starred with Kim Coates and Katie Boland in the thriller Ferocious. She played Leigh Parrish, a small-town girl turned famous actress who goes to great lengths to keep her reputation from being destroyed. Despite negative reviews from critics, Crew received her fourth Leo nomination for her performance.

She later reunited with The Haunting in Connecticut co-star Virginia Madsen in the romantic comedy drama Crazy Kind of Love. She played Bette Mack, a woman who becomes intimately involved with the youngest son of a family nearly torn apart by the father's infidelity. She had a supporting role in the biographical drama Jobs, playing a hippie college student who has a one-night stand with Apple Inc. co-founder Steve Jobs (played by Ashton Kutcher). The film premiered at the 2013 Sundance Film Festival on January 25 and was critically panned.

=== 2014–2019 ===
From 2014 to 2019, Crew starred as venture capitalist Monica Hall on the HBO comedy Silicon Valley, created by Mike Judge. During the first season, her character was originally an assistant to Peter Gregory (played by Christopher Evan Welch), but in the second season she becomes an associate partner with Laurie Bream (played by Suzanne Cryer) after Welch's death in 2013, and later leaves Bream Hall to join Pied Piper as its CFO and business advisor. She guest-starred on the second season of the CTV police procedural drama Motive as Robin Keaton, a young widowed mother who becomes engaged unknowingly to the man responsible for the murder of her son's father.

She later co-starred with Brian Geraghty in the Christian musical drama The Identical, playing a couple who gives one of their newborn twin sons to a sterile couple (played by Ray Liotta and Ashley Judd, respectively) as they cannot raise them both. The film premiered at the Nashville Film Festival on April 17, 2014, to negative reviews from critics. In her third collaboration with director Carl Bessai, she starred as seductive librarian Izzy Fontaine in the crime comedy Bad City, which premiered at the Oldenburg International Film Festival on September 10, 2014. The film was nominated for nine Leo Awards, including Best Feature Length Drama and Best Supporting Performance by a Female in a Motion Picture for Crew.

In 2015, she co-starred with Blake Lively and Ellen Burstyn in the fantasy romance The Age of Adaline, playing the college student daughter of William and Kathy Jones (played by Harrison Ford and Kathy Baker, respectively). Crew co-starred with musical duo Aly & AJ in the comedy drama Weepah Way for Now, which premiered at the Los Angeles Film Festival on June 16, 2015. In 2016, Crew starred in the biographical sports drama Race, playing the love interest of track and field coach Larry Snyder (played by Jason Sudeikis). The film received seven nominations at the 5th Canadian Screen Awards, including Best Motion Picture. She co-starred with Michael Shannon in the western drama Poor Boy, playing a roller girl who moonlights as a prostitute. The film premiered at the Tribeca Film Festival on April 17, 2016.

She later reunited with Ferocious co-star Michael Eklund in the romantic sports comedy Chokeslam. She played Sheena DeWilde, an ill-tempered wrestler who is romantically pursued by her high school ex-boyfriend Corey Swanson (played by Chris Marquette) despite being intimately involved with her manager Tab Hennessey (played by Niall Matter). After the film premiered at the Calgary International Film Festival on October 2, 2016, it was released on February 10, 2017 to mixed reviews from critics. In 2017, Crew starred in the romantic wedding comedy Table 19, playing the maid of honor and narcissistic girlfriend of the wedding's best man Teddy (played by Wyatt Russell).

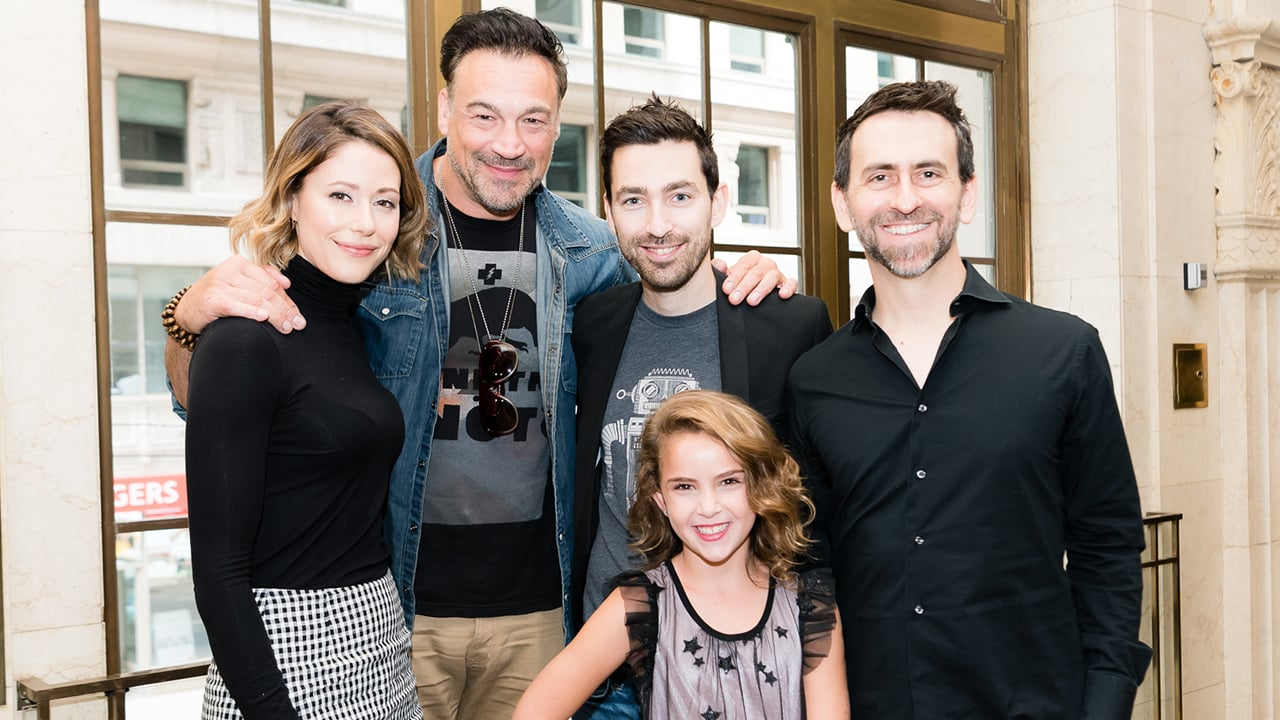
Freaks directors and cast in 2018. Left to right at rear: Crew, Aleks Paunovic, Zach Lipovsky, Adam Stein; front: Lexy Kolker.

She later co-starred with Ed Harris and Amy Madigan in the black comedy thriller A Crooked Somebody, playing a woman whose father was murdered when she was a child. The film premiered at the Los Angeles Film Festival on June 21, 2017 to critical acclaim. She co-starred with Stephen McHattie in the crime drama Juggernaut, playing a woman caught in the middle of a family conflict between her boyfriend Dean Gamble (played by David Cubitt) and his outlaw younger brother Saxon (played by Jack Kesy). The film premiered at the San Diego International Film Festival on October 7, 2017. In 2018, her biggest critical success came with the sci-fi thriller Freaks, co-starring with Emile Hirsch and Bruce Dern. She played Mary, the imprisoned mother of a young girl with telekinetic abilities. The film had its world premiere in the Discovery section at the Toronto International Film Festival on September 8, 2018, where it was nominated for Best Canadian Film.

She co-starred with Adam Brody in the horror Isabelle, playing a woman who begins seeing a supernatural entity following the death of her stillborn son. The film had its world premiere in the Midnight Passion section at the 23rd Busan International Film Festival on October 6, 2018. Despite the film's poor critical reception, Crew was nominated for the Best Actress award at several film festivals for her performance. In 2019, she starred in the horror comedy Tone-Deaf. She played Olive Smith, an entitled and obnoxious millennial who, after being fired from her job, rents a house for a weekend getaway from widowed baby boomer Harvey Parker (played by Robert Patrick, who was also one of the film's executive producers). The film had its world premiere at the SXSW Festival on March 10, 2019. Reviews for the film were predominantly mixed, though Crew's performance was praised.

=== 2020–present ===
In 2020, she appeared in the biographical crime thriller Target Number One. She played Anna Malarek, the wife of journalist Victor Malarek (played by Josh Hartnett). The film was released on July 10, 2020, to positive reviews from critics. Crew starred opposite Alisha Wainwright in the horror television film There's Something Wrong with the Children. She played the mother of the titular children who begin exhibiting disturbing behavior after disappearing in the woods. The film premiered on January 17, 2023, on Epix. She co-starred opposite Tom Felton and Ashley Greene in the psychological thriller Some Other Woman, which premiered at the Mammoth Film Festival on March 3, 2023, to mixed reviews from critics.

== Personal life ==
She is married to actor Dustin Milligan.

== Filmography ==
=== Film ===
Year	Title	Role	Notes
2006	Final Destination 3	Julie Christensen	
2006	John Tucker Must Die	Hallway girl	
2006	Meltdown: Days of Destruction	Kimberly	
2006	She's the Man	Kia	
2008	Monster Ark	Joanna	
2008	Sex Drive	Felicia Alpine	
2008	That One Night	Marie	
2009	The Break-Up Artist	Britney	
2009	The Haunting in Connecticut	Wendy	
2010	Charlie St. Cloud	Tess Carroll	
2010	Repeaters	Sonia Logan	
2010	All That Glitters	Whitney Carmichael	Short film
2011	Picturesque	Canadian girl	Short film
2011	Charlie Zone	Janesca "Jan"	
2011	Sisters & Brothers	Nikki	Also writer
2012	Knife Fight	Helena St. John	
2012	Awesometown	Sam	Short film
2013	Sexy Pool Party	Herself	Short film
2013	Jobs	Julie	
2013	Crazy Kind of Love	Bette Mack	a.k.a. Long Time Gone
2013	Ferocious	Leigh Parrish	
2013	Miss Dial	Amanda	
2014	Bad City	Izzy Fontaine	
2014	The Identical	Helen Hemsley	
2015	The Age of Adaline	Kikki Jones	
2015	Weepah Way for Now	Alice	
2016	Chokeslam	Sheena "Smasheena" DeWilde	
2016	Poor Boy	Charlene Rox	
2016	Race	Peggy	
2017	A Crooked Somebody	Stacy Bishop	
2017	Juggernaut	Amelia	a.k.a. Wrecking Ball
2017	Table 19	Nicole "Nikki"	
2018	Freaks	Mary Lewis	
2018	American Murderer	Jamie	Short film
2018	Isabelle	Larissa Kane	a.k.a. The Wanting
2019	Tone-Deaf	Olive Smith	a.k.a. Killer Instinct
2020	Target Number One	Anna Malarek	a.k.a. Gut Instinct, a.k.a. Most Wanted
2020	Thanks Nurses	Herself	Short film
2023	There's Something Wrong with the Children	Ellie Huerta	
2023	Some Other Woman	Eve Carver	
2024	The Move	Kate	Short film
2026	Freaks Part II	Mary	
2026	Let's Have Kids!	Bella	

=== Television ===
Year	Title	Role	Notes
2005	Life as We Know It	Polly Brewer	Episodes: "You Must Be Trippin", "Friends Don't Let Friends Drive Junk"
2005	Smallville	Sorority girl	Episode: "Recruit"
2005–2006	15/Love	Tanis McTaggart	Main role (seasons 1–2); guest role (season 3)
2006	Diary	Herself	1 episode
2006–2008	Whistler	Carrie Miller	Main role
2011	Suits	Lola Jensen / Mildred Wisnewski	Episode: "Identity Crisis"
2014	Motive	Robin Keaton	Episode: "Raw Deal"
2014–2019	Silicon Valley	Monica Hall	Main role
2017	Lifeline	Haley Hooks	Episodes: "In 33 Days You'll Die", "There's a Chip in Her Arm"
2021	Mr. Corman	Ms. Perry Gellar	Episode: "Action Adventure"
2025	Watson	Lauren Confalone	Recurring

=== Web series ===
Year	Title	Role	Notes
2014	Math Bites	Various	3 episodes
2014	The Slap	Herself	1 episode

=== Music videos ===
Year	Title	Musician	Notes
2017	"Rich White Girls"	Mansionz	Starred opposite Meredith Hagner as the titular characters
2017	"Take Me"	Aly & AJ	Cameo
2017	"Butterfly"	Rhett George	Director
2019	"Star Maps"	Aly & AJ	Director

== Awards and nominations ==
Year	Award	Category	Nominated work	Result	Ref.
2007	Leo Awards	Best Lead Performance by a Female in a Dramatic Series	Whistler	Won	
2011	Leo Awards	Best Lead Performance by a Female in a Motion Picture	Repeaters	Nominated	
2012	Leo Awards	Best Lead Performance by a Female in a Motion Picture	Sisters & Brothers	Won	
2013	Leo Awards	Best Lead Performance by a Female in a Motion Picture	Ferocious	Nominated	
2015	Leo Awards	Best Supporting Performance by a Female in a Motion Picture	Bad City	Nominated	
2015	Golden Maple Awards	Best Actress in a TV Series Broadcast in the US	Silicon Valley	Won	
2016	Golden Maple Awards	Best Actress in a TV Series Broadcast in the US	Silicon Valley	Nominated	
2016	Golden Maple Awards	Newcomer of the Year in a TV Series Broadcast in the US	Silicon Valley	Won	
2019	First Glance Film Festival Los Angeles	Best Actress – Feature Film	Isabelle	Nominated	
2019	Fort Myers Beach International Film Festival	Best Performance in a Feature Film	Isabelle	Nominated	
2019	Hamilton Film Festival	Best Actress	Isabelle	Nominated	
2019	Twister Alley Film Festival	Best Actress – Feature Film	Isabelle	Nominated	
