= Turning Paige =

- Theatrical poster
- Directed by: Robert Cuffley
- Written by: Robert Cuffley; Jason Long
- Produced by: Carolyn McMaster
- Starring: Katharine Isabelle; Nicholas Campbell; Brendan Fletcher; Philip DeWilde
- Cinematography: Mark Dobrescu
- Edited by: Ken Berry
- Music by: Mike Shields
- Release date: October 2001
- Running time: 109 minutes
- Country: Canada
- Language: English

Turning Paige is a 2001 Canadian drama film directed by Robert Cuffley. The film focuses on the life of Paige (Katharine Isabelle) and her family as she comes to terms with tragedy in the family's past. The film's title refers to the phrase "turn the page" as the central character must come to terms with her past and put it behind her if she is to move on in life.

== Plot ==
The plot revolves around the life of aspiring writer and high school student Paige Fleming. Paige incorporates aspects of her life into her fictional stories. Living alone with her father Ross (Nicholas Campbell) a recovering alcoholic, their lives are upset by the return of Paige's brother Trevor (Philip DeWilde) who has been absent for two years. His return forces Paige to address her life and memories of the tragic suicide of her mother.

== Cast ==
- Katharine Isabelle as Paige Fleming
- Nicholas Campbell as Ross Fleming
- Torri Higginson as Sheila Newlands
- Brendan Fletcher as Jeff Simms
- Philip DeWilde as Trevor Fleming
- Nikki Barnett as Danielle Whitaker
- John Diamond as Steve Pettle
- Chris Kelly as Chet
- David McClelland as Chet's Dad
- Janet Monid as Woman In Woods
- Dawn McKelvie Cyr as Social Worker
- Charlie Rhindress as Chris

== Nominations and awards ==
Turning Paige was nominated for four Genie awards in 2002; Best Actor, Best Supporting Actor, Best Music Composition and Best Art Direction. It won Best Western Canada Screenplay and Telefilm Canada Best Emerging Western Canadian Feature-Film Director at the 20th Annual Vancouver International Film Festival in 2001. It won the Alberta Film and Television Award for both Best Director, and Best Editor, Dramatic.
