= Carolyn McMaster =

Canadian film producer

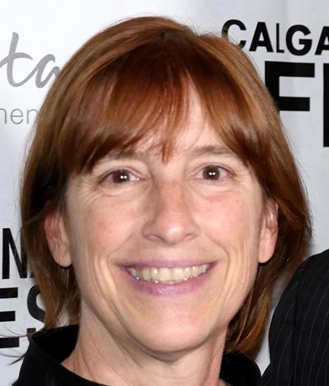
- Carolyn McMaster at CIFF
- Occupation: Producer

Carolyn McMaster is a Canadian film producer and president of CHAOS a film company. Currently, in production is the summer romance film Sweet Summer Love starring Vanessa Lengies and Jesse Hutch. In 2022 Carolyn produced the Walter Hill western Dead for a Dollar starring Christoph Waltz, Willem Dafoe, Rachel Brosnahan and Benjamin Bratt. Dead for a Dollar premiered at the Venice International Film Festival. Previous work includes Dream Wedding, Key To Love, Christmas by the Book starring Lindy Booth the indigenous horror film Don't Say Its Name, Root of the Problem with Sergio Di Zio and Claire Rankin directed by Scott Sikma, the sci-fi thriller Parallel Minds, starring Greg Bryk and Tommie Amber Pirie, the 2016 romantic comedy Chokeslam starring Chris Marquette and Amanda Crew with wrestling icon Mick Foley. In 2013 the thriller Ferocious, Amanda Crew and Kim Coates was released. Walk All Over Me starring Leelee Sobieski and Tricia Helfer premiered at the Toronto International Film Festival in 2008;. Carolyn is also a member of the Producers Guild of America and the Academy of Canadian Cinema and Television.

== Filmography ==
- Key To Love (2023) (Feature Film) (producer)
- Dream Wedding (2023) (Feature Film) (producer)
- Dead for a Dollar (2022) (Feature Film) (producer)
- Christmas by the Book (2022) (Feature Film) (producer)
- Don't Say Its Name (2020) (Feature Film) (producer)
- Root of the Problem (2019) (Feature Film) (producer)
- Parallel Minds (2019) (Feature Film) (producer)
- Cowboy Culture (2017 - 2019) (Documentary Series) (producer)
- Chokeslam (2016) (Feature Film) (producer)
- The Caravan (2016) (Feature Documentary) (executive producer)
- Ferocious (2013) (Feature Film) (producer)
- Walk All Over Me (2008) (Feature Film) (producer)
- Pay Dirt: Making the Unconventional Conventional (2005) (Feature Documentary) (producer)
- Alberta's Oil Sands: Centuries in the Making (2005) (Straight-to-video) (producer)
- On the Edge of Destruction: The Frank Slide Story (2003) (Documentary) (executive producer)
- Turning Paige (2001) (Feature Film) (producer)
- Manon Rheaume: The Woman Behind the Mask (2000) (Documentary) (producer)
- Ghost Whales of Lancaster Sound (1996) (Feature Documentary) (executive producer/director)
- Kuwait: The Aftermath (1990) (Feature Documentary) (producer/director)
