= Space Cowboys =

2000 film by Clint Eastwood

- Theatrical release poster
- Directed by: Clint Eastwood
- Written by: Ken Kaufman; Howard Klausner
- Produced by: Andrew Lazar; Clint Eastwood
- Starring: Clint Eastwood; Tommy Lee Jones; Donald Sutherland; James Garner; Marcia Gay Harden; William Devane; Loren Dean; Courtney B. Vance; James Cromwell
- Cinematography: Jack N. Green
- Edited by: Joel Cox
- Music by: Lennie Niehaus
- Production companies: Village Roadshow Pictures; Clipsal Films; Malpaso Productions; Mad Chance Productions
- Distributed by: Warner Bros. Pictures
- Release date: August 4, 2000
- Running time: 130 minutes
- Country: United States
- Language: English
- Budget: $60–65 million
- Box office: $128.9 million

Space Cowboys is a 2000 American adventure drama film directed and produced by Clint Eastwood. It stars Eastwood, Tommy Lee Jones, Donald Sutherland, and James Garner as four aging former test pilots who are sent into space to repair an old Soviet satellite. It was theatrically released by Warner Bros. Pictures on August 4, 2000, received positive reviews from critics, and was a box-office success by grossing $128.9 million against a $60–65 million budget.

== Plot ==
In 1958, two U.S. Air Force pilots and aspiring astronauts William "Hawk" Hawkins and Frank Corvin are testing a modified Bell X-2 when Hawk decides to break speed and altitude records. The plane stalls and they are forced to eject, narrowly missing a Boeing B-50 Superfortress flying with navigator "Tank" Sullivan. On the ground, Frank punches Hawk, but their fight is broken up by flight engineer Jerry O'Neill. Their boss, Bob Gerson, chastises Hawk before taking them to a press conference, where he announces that the newly created NASA, rather than the USAF, will be conducting space flight tests.

In the present day, NASA is tasked with preventing a Soviet communications satellite, IKON, from decaying out of orbit and crashing to Earth because of the uplink loss. The satellite's archaic electronics are based on those of Skylab that Frank had developed. Bob, now a project manager at NASA, requests Frank's help. Frank still despises Bob, but agrees provided he has the help of "Team Daedalus" including Hawk, Tank, and Jerry. Bob plans to have younger astronauts shadow the four, so as to replace them before launch. When the press learn of Frank's team, the Vice President convinces Bob that they must be part of the mission for publicity. The old and young teams soon work together, with the older astronauts showing off skills learned without the aid of onboard computers.

The Space Shuttle Daedalus finds the satellite. It is not a communication satellite but in fact houses six nuclear missiles, relics from the Cold War and a violation of the Outer Space Treaty. Frank discovers that the satellite control system was stolen from Bob's files by the KGB, and without a control signal from the ground via the damaged uplink, the satellite's computers will consider that ground control was wiped out by a nuclear strike and launch the missiles in retaliation at predetermined targets that are now close to major cities.

NASA and the crew plan to use the payload-assist rockets to push the satellite into deep space, and therefore prevent the nuclear launch. However, one of the younger astronauts, Ethan Glance, acting under Bob's original orders, tries to put the satellite into stable orbit himself. His actions sets off a chain reaction: the satellite collides with the shuttle, damaging most of the shuttle's computer systems and engines, destroying the solar panels on the satellite, and sending it into a faster decaying orbit, while Ethan is knocked out and dragged along with the satellite.

While Tank and Jerry tend to the other young astronaut Roger Hines, who suffered a concussion on the impact, Frank and Hawk space walk to the satellite in time to activate a booster rocket and slow the orbit's decay. After rescuing Ethan, they realize that the only option is to have someone ride on the satellite as they fire the missiles' engines so that it escapes into deep space. Hawk, who was recently widowed and who has eight months to live from pancreatic cancer, sacrifices himself, hoping that he will be able to land on the Moon to fulfill his life's dream.

Frank, Tank, and Jerry now plan to bring the shuttle down over water since landing it would be difficult, but the shuttle comes in too fast. They safely bail out Roger and Ethan. Tank and Jerry then stay with Frank regardless of the risk. Frank recalls a maneuver Hawk had used before, purposely increasing the shuttle's angle in the flare to bring the aircraft near a stall, thus allowing the shuttle to drop its speed quickly and allowing him to land the shuttle safely.

The film ends with the Frank Sinatra song "Fly Me to the Moon", zooming in on the surface of the Moon showing that Hawk had not only landed there before he died, but survived long enough to lie against a rock formation, looking back at Earth.

== Cast ==
- Clint Eastwood as Frank D. Corvin
- Tommy Lee Jones as William Hawkins
- Donald Sutherland as Jerry O'Neill
- James Garner as Pastor Tank Sullivan
- James Cromwell as Bob Gerson
- Marcia Gay Harden as Sara Holland
- William Devane as Eugene ("Gene") Davis
- Loren Dean as Ethan Glance
- Courtney B. Vance as Roger Hines
- Rade Šerbedžija as General Vostov
- Barbara Babcock as Barbara Corvin
- Blair Brown as Anne Caruthers
- Jay Leno as himself

== Production ==
Principal photography started in July 1999 and lasted three months. Scenes were filmed on location at the Johnson Space Center in Houston, Texas, and the Kennedy Space Center and Cape Canaveral Air Force Station in Florida. Interior shots of the flight simulator, shuttle, and mission control were filmed on sets at Warner Bros.

The 1958 portrayals of the characters are filmed with younger actors dubbed by their older counterparts.

The original music score was composed by longtime Clint Eastwood collaborator Lennie Niehaus.

== Release ==
The film grossed over $90 million in its United States release, and a further $38 million internationally, for a worldwide total of $128.8 million.

== Reception ==
Space Cowboys was well received by critics. Rotten Tomatoes reports a critic score of 78% based on 122 reviews, with an average rating of 6.72/10. The website's consensus reads, "While the plot is overly clichéd, the superb acting by the stars (especially the tense interactions between Clint Eastwood and Tommy Lee Jones) and the spectacular special effects make this a movie worth seeing." On Metacritic, the film has a weighted average score of 73 out of 100, based on 35 critics, indicating "generally favorable reviews". Audiences polled by CinemaScore gave the film an average grade of "A−" on an A+ to F scale.

Roger Ebert of the Chicago Sun-Times gave it three out of four stars and wrote: "It's too secure within its traditional story structure to make much seem at risk – but with the structure come the traditional pleasures as well."

== Accolades ==
The film was nominated for the Academy Award for Best Sound Editing in 2001.

== Bibliography ==
- Hughes, Howard (2009). Aim for the Heart: The Films of Clint Eastwood. London: I.B. Tauris. ISBN 978-1-84511-902-7.
