= Ferocious =

- Film poster
- Directed by: Robert Cuffley
- Written by: Robert Cuffley; Marguerite Pigott (story editor)
- Produced by: Carolyn McMaster; Anand Ramayya
- Starring: Amanda Crew; Kim Coates; Dustin Milligan; Michael Eklund; Katie Boland
- Cinematography: Mark Dobrescu
- Edited by: Ken Filewych
- Music by: Mike Shields
- Release date: March 7, 2013
- Running time: 93 minutes
- Country: Canada
- Language: English

Ferocious is a Canadian psychological thriller film released in 2013. Written and directed by Robert Cuffley, the film stars Amanda Crew, Kim Coates, Dustin Milligan, Michael Eklund and Katie Boland.

== Synopsis ==
Leigh Parrish, a small town Saskatchewan girl who becomes a television star in America, returns to her hometown with her manager Callum Beck. She has a secret that leads her to a dingy nightclub owned by Sal, and things devolve into a night of violence that also involves the club's bartender, Eric, and Tess, an obsessed fan of Leigh's.

== Cast ==
- Amanda Crew as Leigh Parrish
- Kim Coates as Sal / Maurice
- Michael Eklund as Eric
- Dustin Milligan as Callum Beck
- Katie Boland as Tess
- Stephen Huszar as Steve Sherwood
- Amy Matysio as Yolanda

== Production ==
Ferocious was filmed in late 2011-early 2012 in Saskatoon, Saskatchewan. Actors Kim Coates and Michael Eklund are both Saskatoon natives.
