= Meltdown: Days of Destruction =

Original release
- Release: 2006

Meltdown: Days of Destruction is a 2006 television film. It primarily concerns social breakdown, combat, and personal relationships during a heat wave of 110-140 degrees Fahrenheit.

== Plot ==
An asteroid much larger than that which caused the Chicxulub Crater is attacked by a ten-megaton nuclear warhead minutes before its collision with Earth, breaking it into three pieces, the largest of which (the size of Iceland) bounces off the Earth's atmosphere. This "substantially changes the Earth's orbit", resulting in an increase in temperature predicted to rise to 160 Fahrenheit within five days. Authorities decide to inform the public of the problem after two days, touching off a wave of looting and attacks by gangs of police officers and criminals. One family gets together, hotwires a refrigerated truck, and heads for an airport where they plan to meet with a plane taking them to a remote Arctic outpost. Several gun battles ensue, until the disaster ends in a sudden rain as the Earth "finds its natural balance" with the gravity of the other planets as they manage to pull it back to its correct orbit.
