= Walk All over Me =

Walk All Over Me
- Canadian theatrical release poster
- Directed by: Robert Cuffley
- Written by: Robert Cuffley; Jason Long
- Produced by: Carolyn McMaster
- Starring: Leelee Sobieski; Tricia Helfer; Lothaire Bluteau; Michael Eklund; Michael Adamthwaite; Jacob Tierney; Ross McMillan
- Cinematography: Norayr Kasper
- Edited by: Ken Filewych
- Music by: Mike Shields
- Production company: CHAOS a film company
- Release date: September 11, 2007 (Toronto International Film Festival)
- Running time: 98 minutes
- Country: Canada
- Language: English

Walk All over Me is a 2007 Canadian film written by Robert Cuffley and Jason Long. The film stars Leelee Sobieski as "Alberta", a small-town girl who assumes the false identity of her former babysitter and current dominatrix roommate "Celene", played by Tricia Helfer. Lothaire Bluteau, Michael Eklund, Michael Adamthwaite, and Jacob Tierney also star in the film. It was directed by Cuffley and produced by Carolyn McMaster.

Walk All over Me premiere at the 2007 Toronto International Film Festival, where it was bought by The Weinstein Company.

== Synopsis ==
Alberta leaves her small hometown to move to the city, and she moves in with her former babysitter, Celene, who wears thigh high boots and is now a professional dominatrix. Out of money, Alberta decides to impersonate her roommate's identity, lured by the $300 per hour pay rate. While working with her first client, Paul, three men, Rene, Isaac, and Aaron, break into the house, believing that Paul stole half a million dollars from Rene's club. Paul defends himself, saying that whatever money he has, he had won at the casino. They overenthusiastically interrogate Paul and he is knocked unconscious; meanwhile, Alberta flees the scene, grabbing Paul's money on her way out, which leads the robbers to believe that she is involved with the theft as well.

Alberta eventually comes clean to Celine, but is found by Rene who tries to kidnap Alberta, only to get into a losing fight with Celine. She brings him to a sub's house and leaves to check on Paul at Alberta's insistence, dressed in a nurse costume. She tries to escape with him while Isaac is lured to a mall by Alberta, but Aaron gets suspicious and ties both a wakened Paul and Celine to separate radiators, waiting for Isaac or Renee to come back to figure things out.

Meanwhile, Alberta tries to dominate Isaac in the food court, where things don't go quite as planned and he eventually pulls a gun on a store security officer, and is tackled by the security team and police arrive to take him to jail, while Alberta takes his car and glasses and goes looking for Celine. At Paul's house, she crashes into a fence which dislodges the back bumper and reveals that Isaac was the real thief. Alberta goes in to confront Rene and Aaron and reveals to both that Isaac was the real thief, and as the situation resolves, Paul asks Alberta to go out on a real date with him, to which she says yes after he begs. Going back for the car, they find out that the neighbors are already helping to fix the fence, and that they won't get away with the stolen money after all.

Alberta and Celine go to a coffee shop where Alberta tries to make amends by giving Celine some of the money she grabbed before going into Paul's house, and they make up.

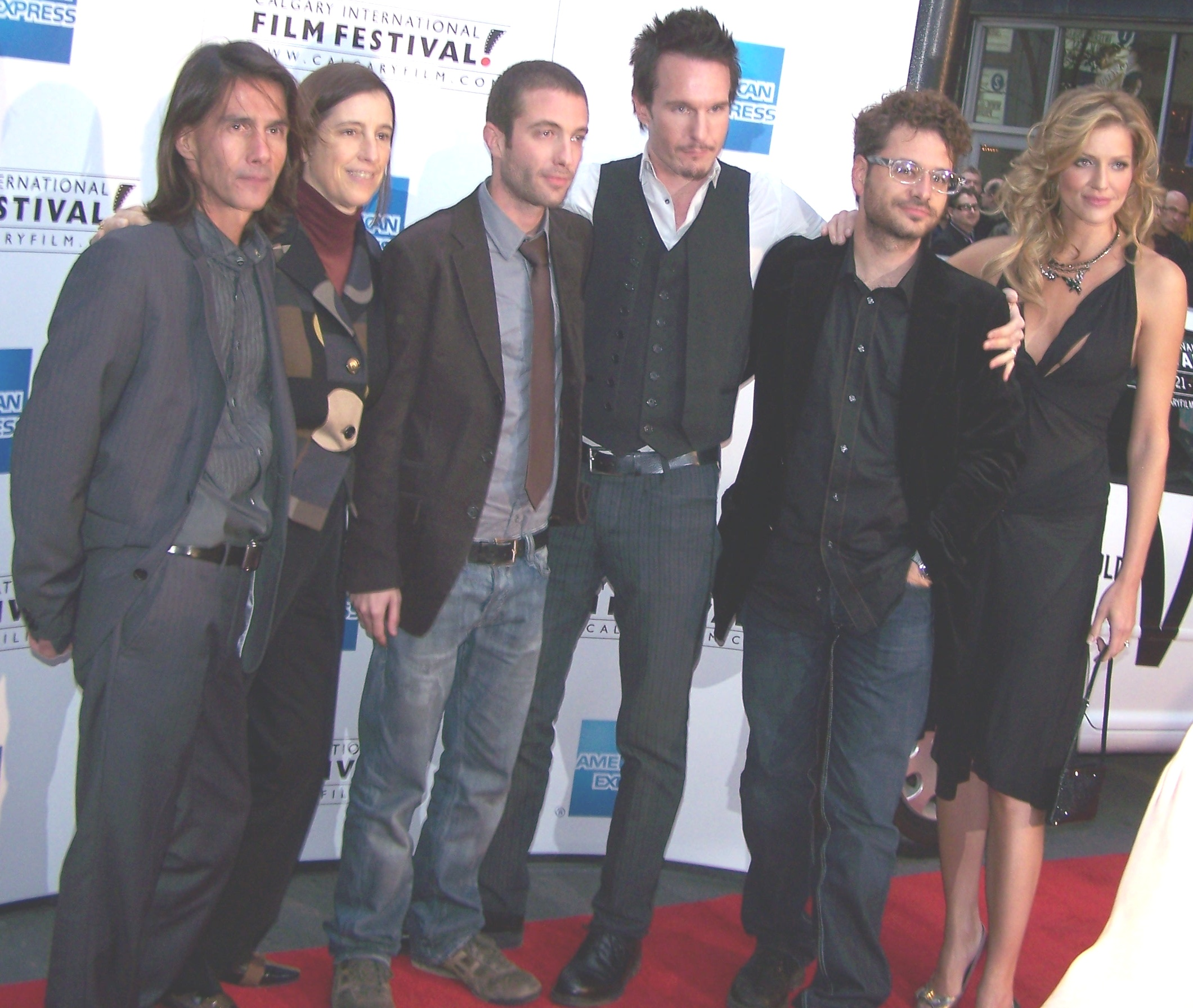
Left to right: Lothaire Bluteau, Carolyn McMaster, Jacob Tierney, Michael Eklund, Robert Cuffley, and Tricia Helfer (CIFF 2007)

== Cast ==
- Leelee Sobieski as Alberta, a small town girl
- Tricia Helfer as Celene, former babysitter of Alberta, and professional dominatrix
- Lothaire Bluteau as Rene, club owner who believes Paul hides money from him
- Jacob Tierney as Paul, newcomer to Vancouver
- Michael Eklund as Aaron, an ex-convict and brother of Isaac
- Michael Adamthwaite as Isaac, brother of Aaron, and works for Rene
- Ross McMillan as Spencer, regular slave of Celene

== Production ==
While the film is set in Vancouver, principal filming was actually done in Manitoba.

== Reception ==
=== Reviews ===
On the review aggregator Rotten Tomatoes, the film has a 40% approval rating, based on five reviews.

=== Awards ===
Awards
Award	Year	Category	Name	Outcome
AMPIA Awards	2008	Best Feature Film	Carolyn McMaster	Won
Leo Awards	2008	Best Supporting Performance by a Male in a Feature Length Drama	Michael Eklund	Won
Leo Awards	2008	Best Lead Performance by a Female in a Feature Length Drama	Tricia Helfer	Nominated
Leo Awards	2008	Best Supporting Performance by a Male in a Feature Length Drama	Michael Adamthwaite	Nominated
