= Richard Quesnel =

Canadian entrepreneur and mining engineer

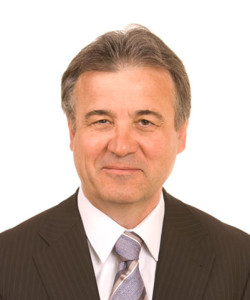
- Born: 1955 (age 70–71); Quebec, Canada
- Education: Mcgill University (BEng)
- Occupations: Executive Chairman of Consolidated Lithium Metals, Director of Sama Resources

Richard Quesnel (born 1955) is a Canadian entrepreneur and mining engineer; currently Executive Chairman of Consolidated Lithium Metals, and board member of directors at Sama Resources.

Richard Quesnel was born in Quebec, Canada. He has a Bachelor of Science in mining engineering from Mcgill University, is a member of the Order of Engineers of Quebec, and speaks English/French.

== Career ==
Throughout his 40-year mining career as a professional engineer and entrepreneur, Quesnel has contributed to the successful development of several large scale gold, copper, nickel and iron ore mining projects around the world.

- Consolidated Thompson: Bloom Lake (President and CEO)
- Taseko Mines: Gibraltar Mine (General Mine Manager)
- Redpath: Montcalm Mine (Project Manager)
- Barrick Gold: Meikle Mine (Mine Manager)
- Québec Cartier Mining Company: Mount Wright (Mine Manager)
- Placer Dome: Sigma Mine (Senior Mining Engineer)

In his capacity for over 5 years as president and chief executive officer of Consolidated Thompson, Richard Quesnel was responsible for the development of Consolidated Thompson's Bloom Lake iron ore deposit which came into commercial production in early 2010, three years after completion of the feasibility study.

== Insider trading convictions, appeal, and acquittal ==
According to the Autorité des marchés financiers (AMF), Quesnel purchased 30,000 shares of Consolidated Thompson-Lundmark Gold Mines Limited (now Consolidated Thompson Iron Mines Limited) on two occasions in March 2006 while in possession of undisclosed information regarding the Bloom Lake mine feasibility study.

On November 17, 2010, the Hon. Judge Juanita Westmorelant-Traoté of the Court of Quebec, district Montreal, found Richard Quesnel guilty of these charges. On May 6, 2011, Judge Juanita Westmorelant-Traoté of the Court of Quebec, district of Montreal, imposed $132,974 in fines against Richard Quesnel.

Legal counsel advised Quesnel these judgement were erroneous in law and informed him of the compelling grounds for appeal in which Richard Quesnel intended to vigorously pursue.

Richard Quesnel appealed these insider trading convictions to the Quebec Superior Court. On June 12, 2012, the Hon. Rejean F. Paul rendered judgment, granting Richard Quesnel's appeal and acquitting him of all insider trading charges.

The Autorité des marchés financiers (AMF) subsequently applied to the Quebec Court of Appeal, seeking leave to appeal Richard Quesnel's acquittal. On August 15, 2012, the Hon. Jacques Dufrense of the Quebec Court of Appeal rendered judgment denying the Application for Leave. This judgement rendered, acquitted Richard Quesnel fully of all insider trading charges.
