= Michael Eklund =

Canadian actor

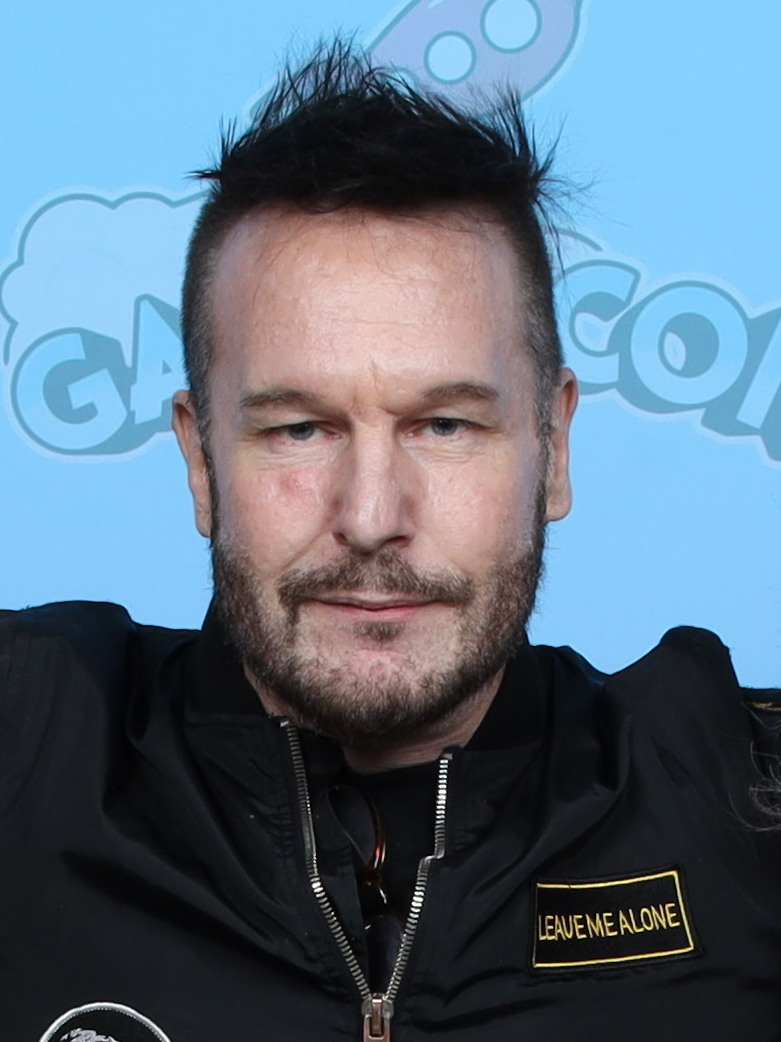
- Eklund at GalaxyCon Oklahoma City in 2024
- Born: Saskatoon, Saskatchewan, Canada
- Occupation: Actor
- Years active: 2000–present

Michael Eklund is a Canadian television and film actor who is known for playing the role of the villain or antihero. His characters are often described as being "creepy".

His roles include a kidnapper who terrorizes characters played by Halle Berry and Abigail Breslin in the 2013 psychological thriller The Call, serial killer Barton Mathis in the second season of the superhero TV series Arrow, drug trafficker Zane Morgan in the second season of the psychological horror drama series Bates Motel (2014), Martin, the leader of a hedonist group called "The Rowdy 3" on the sci-fi TV series Dirk Gently’s Holistic Detective Agency (2016–2017) and demon Bobo Del Rey on the sci-fi TV series Wynonna Earp (2016–2021).

== Early life ==
Born in Saskatoon, Saskatchewan, Eklund fell in love with the movies at five years of age when his mother took him to see his first movie. He participated in school theatre then later decided to study painting at the Alberta College of Art in Calgary before dropping-out and moving to Vancouver in order to pursue an acting career.

== Career ==
=== Television ===
While living in Vancouver, Eklund has appeared on several Canadian and American television series filmed in the area.

His first television role was in 2000 as a police officer in an episode of the sci-fi series Dark Angel. Eklund appeared on an episode of Stargate SG-1 in 2002, and appeared in 2 episodes of Battlestar Galactica the following year. In 2005 he appeared on the Canadian series Da Vinci's Inquest and Cold Squad. He also had a recurring role on the Canadian mini-series Terminal City that same year.

Eklund appeared in 2 episodes of Smallville in different roles in 2001 and 2007. From 2005–2007 he played narcotics detective Rene Desjardins on the Canadian crime drama series Intelligence. In 2007 Eklund also had a recurring role on the Canadian series Blood Ties.

In 2008 Eklund appeared on an episode of Supernatural. In 2009 and 2010 he appeared on episodes of the Canadian series Flashpoint . In 2010 he also appeared on episodes of the sci-fi series Caprica and Fringe. He also had a recurring role on the Canadian series Shattered that same year. In 2012 Eklund appeared in 2 episodes of the sci-fi thriller series Alcatraz. He also appeared in an episode of Arrow in 2013.

In 2014 Eklund played Zane Morgan, a recurring character in the second season of the psychological horror drama Bates Motel. In 2015 he also played recurring character Robert Zorin on the Canadian sci-fi series Continuum.

From 2016–2017 Eklund played Martin, the punk energy vampire on the series Dirk Gently's Holistic Detective Agency In 2018 he also appeared in 3 episodes of the sci-fi series Altered Carbon as Dimi 2, an illegal copy of character Dimitri Kadmin.

In 2016 he also joined the cast of Wynonna Earp, a series filmed in Calgary, Alberta and surrounding rural areas. On the series Eklund plays Bobo Del Rey, a fur-coat wearing Revenant.

=== Film ===
In 2007 Eklund appeared in the Al Pacino thriller film 88 Minutes. In 2009, he had a small role in Terry Gilliam's The Imaginarium of Doctor Parnassus.

He played Larry in the 2010 comedy-western film Gunless with Paul Gross That same year Eklund appeared in the British-Canadian comedy film The Making of Plus One, a film that also played at Cannes in 2009.

In 2011, he starred alongside Michael Biehn in the Xavier Gens thriller The Divide as Bobby. He also played the character of Father in the apocalyptic siege warfare film The Day with Dominic Monaghan and Shawn Ashmore that same year.

In 2013, Eklund played Michael Foster, a serial killer who kidnaps Abigail Breslin's character and terrorizes Halle Berry in the film The Call.

Eklund has also collaborated three times with Calgary-based film director Robert Cuffley: In 2007, he played a crime boss's enforcer in Cuffley's dark comedy Walk All Over Me. In 2012, he played a desperate bartender in the violent thriller Ferocious and in 2016, he starred in Chokeslam as Luke Petrie, a friend of the film's protagonist.

== Filmography ==
=== Film ===
Film
Year	Title	Role	Notes
2000	The Other Side of Being	Rhys	
2001	Blackwoods	Billy/Man	
2002	K-9: P.I.	Billy Cochran	Direct-to-video
2002	Stark Raving Mad	Sickly Thin Guy	
2003	House of the Dead	Hugh	
2006	Daingerfield	Mr. Shorts	Short film
2006	Blowburn	Teacher	Short film
2006	The Entrance	Ryan James	
2006	Klatsassin	Thief	Short film
2007	Seed	Executioner	
2007	When a Man Falls	Hardware Store Cashier	
2007	88 Minutes	J.T. Rycker	
2007	In the Name of the King: A Dungeon Siege Tale	Scout	
2007	Postal	Disgruntled Man	
2007	Walk All over Me	Aaron	
2007	BloodRayne 2: Deliverance	The Preacher	Direct-to-video
2008	Sarah in the Dark	Jason	Short film
2008	Inconceivable	Marlon Bell	
2009	Watchmen	Man in Riot Crowd	
2009	The Imaginarium of Doctor Parnassus	Tony's assistant	
2010	Smokin' Aces 2: Assassins' Ball	Navy Dude	Direct-to-video
2010	The Making of Plus One	Dave Dallas	
2010	The Final Storm	Co-op Man	
2010	Gunless	Larry	
2010	Guido Superstar: The Rise of Guido	Rocket Yella	
2010	Hunt to Kill	Geary	
2010	Exposed	Man	Short film
2010	The Muse	The Painter	Short film
2010	Messages Deleted	Adam Brickles	
2011	Pressed	Jimmy	
2011	The Divide	Bobby	
2011	Tactical Force	Kenny	
2011	Sisters & Brothers	Director	
2011	The Day	Father	
2011	The Planting	The Shooter	
2012	Errors of the Human Body	Geoffrey Burton	
2013	The Marine 3: Homefront	Eckert	
2013	Ferocious	Eric	
2013	The Call	Michael Foster	
2013	Assault on Wall Street	McKay	
2013	Nurse 3D	Richie	
2013	3 Days in Havana	Intense Man	
2014	Cruel & Unusual	Julien	
2014	Primary	Harry	
2014	See No Evil 2	Holden	
2014	Poker Night	The Man	
2014	What an Idiot	Bradley	
2015	Eadweard	Eadweard Muybridge	Producer
2015	Lower Bay		
2015	Vendetta	Warden Snyder	
2015	Zoom	Mustache Guy	
2015	Into the Forest	Stan	
2015	Dark	Benoit	
2015	Mr. Right	Johnny Moon	
2016	Dead Draw	Mack	
2016	Chokeslam	Luke Petrie	
2017	Mercs	Crisp	Short film
2017	The Sound	Detective John Richards	
2017	The Hitman Never Dies	Gus	Producer
2018	West of Hell	Roland Bursley	
2018	The Package	Gas Station Attendant	
2019	Cold Pursuit	Speedo	
2020	The Sinners	Detective Zankowski	
2020	Bright Hill Road	Owen	
2020	Welcome to Sudden Death	Jobe	Direct-to-video
2021	Antlers	Kenny Glass	
2022	Detective Knight: Rogue	Winna	
2022	Detective Knight: Redemption	Winna	
2023	Detective Knight: Independence	Winna	
2023	Trap House	Cormac	
2024	Dark Match	Spencer	
2024	The Silent Hour	Angel Flores	
2025	Locked	Karl	
TBA	The Farm	Ekles	Announced

=== Television ===
Television
Year	Title	Role	Notes
2000	Dark Angel	Officer Miller	Season 1 episode 4: "Flushed"
2000	Level 9	Chief Druid	Season 1 episode 2: "DefCon"
2000	Hollywood Off-Ramp	Bob	Season 1 episode 26: "Lights, Camera, Reaction"
2001	The Outer Limits	Jacob	Season 7 episode 3: "A New Life"
2001	Sk8	Skater	
2001	The Lone Gunmen	Weiner Man/Clerk	2 episodes
2001	Special Unit 2	White Guy	Season 2 episode 7: "White Guy"
2001–2007	Smallville	Richter Maddox/Will	2 episodes
2002	Living with the Dead	Ronnie Higgins	TV movie
2002	Mysterious Ways	Max Arnette	Season 2 episode 21: "Listen"
2002	Jeremiah	Vernon Diggs	Season 1 episode 12: "The Touch"
2002	Stargate SG-1	Dark-haired Man	Season 6 episode 5: "Nightwalkers"
2002	Haunted	Stan	Episode 1: "Pilot"
2002	We'll Meet Again	Tommy Barry	TV movie
2002	Killer Bees!	Deputy Slim	TV movie
2002	Critical Assembly	Jefferson	TV movie
2003	Still Life	Dirt Bag Guy	Season 1 episode 2: "Evidence"
2003	Dead Like Me	Male Protester	Season 1 episode 3: "Curious George"
2003	Romeo!	Sam	Season 1 episode 3: "Let's Make a Deal"
2003	Battlestar Galactica	Prosna	Miniseries
2004	Touching Evil	Carl Burgess	Episode 12: "No Mercy"
2004	The 4400	Dean Keating	Season 1 episode 4: "Trial By Fire"
2004	Deadly Visions	Steven	TV movie
2004	A Beachcombers Christmas	Mickey Buchanan	TV movie
2005	Da Vinci's Inquest	Horvath	2 episodes
2005	Cold Squad	Rick Barnes	Season 7 episode 10: "Borders"
2005	Godiva's	Johnny G.	Season 1 episode 2: "The Hungry Ghost"
2005	Painkiller Jane	Dude	TV movie
2005	Terminal City	Henry Lundquist	Main role 10 episode
2005	Zixx: Level Two	Earl	3 episodes
2005–2007	Intelligence	Rene Desjardins	13 episodes
2006	Masters of Horror	Cashier	Season 1 episode 11: "Pick Me Up"
2006	Eight Days to Live	Weaver	TV movie
2006	Saved	Smelly Bill	Episode 4: "Fog"
2006	Alice, I Think	Marcus	13 episodes
2007	Termination Point	Liam	TV movie
2007	Blood Ties	Norman Bridewell	3 episodes
2007	Traveler	Jimmy	2 episodes
2007	Flash Gordon	Quin	Episode 7: "Alliances (Part 1)"
2007–2014	Psych	Floor Manager/Ruben Leonard	2 episodes
2008	Supernatural	Ed Brewer	Season 4 episode 5: "Monster Movie"
2009	Zixx: Level Three	Merle	Season 3 episode 7: "My Name Isn't Earl"
2009	The Gambler, the Girl and the Gunslinger	Red	TV movie
2009	Revolution	Sgt. Yun	TV movie
2009–2010	Flashpoint	Bruce DeMaura/Bruce	2 episodes
2010	Caprica	Waylon	Episode 3: "Rebirth"
2010	The Bridge	Dex	Episode 4: "The Unguarded Moment"
2010	Fringe	Milo	Episode: "The Plateau"
2010	Shattered	Nick Ducet	7 episodes
2011	True Justice	Miles Toole	2 episodes
2011	Endgame	Deacon	Episode 12: "Polar Opposites"
2011	Kits	Jed	TV movie
2012	Alcatraz	Kit Nelson	2 episodes
2013	Tom Dick & Harriet	Reese Danzinger	TV movie
2013	Arrow	Barton Mathis/Dollmaker	2 episodes
2014	Almost Human	Eric Lathem	Episode 12: "Beholder"
2014	Bates Motel	Zane Morgan	8 episodes
2015	Gotham	Bob	Season 1 episode 13: "Welcome Back, Jim Gordon"
2015	Continuum	Robert Zorin	5 episodes
2016–2019	Wynonna Earp	Bobo Del Rey/Robert Svane	19 episodes
2016–2017	Dirk Gently's Holistic Detective Agency	Martin	Main cast 8 episodes
2018	Altered Carbon	Dimi the Twin/The Patchwork Man	3 episodes
2018–2019	Van Helsing	Abraham Van Helsing / Jacob Van Helsing	3 episodes
2019	The Twilight Zone	Otto	Season 1 episode 8: "Point of Origin"
2020	Legends of Tomorrow	Grigori Rasputin	Season 5 episode 2: "Meet the Legends"
2021	Debris	Black Market Dealer	"Pilot" episode
2021	Big Sky	Alan Hedley	Season 1 episode 10: "Catastrophic Thinking"

== Awards and nominations ==
Eklund won the 2008 Leo Award for Best Performance in a Supporting Role for his work on the 2007 Canadian crime drama and thriller film Walk All Over Me.

In 2012 Eklund won the Best Actor award at Fantastic Fest for his role as Dr. Geoff Burton in the psychological thriller Errors of the Human Body. He also won the 2013 Leo Award for Best Performance by a Male in a Feature Length Drama for the same role.

In 2015 Eklund won the Best Actor award presented by the Union of British Columbia Performers and Alliance of Canadian Cinema, Television and Radio Artists (UBCPA/ACTRA) for his portrayal of English photographer Eadweard Muybridge in the biographical film Eadweard.

Michael Eklund awards and nominations
Awards and nominations
Award	Wins	Nominations
Totals
Alhambra Film Festival	1	1
Eerie Horror Fest	1	1
Fantastic Fest	1	1
Leo Awards	5	14
UBCP/ACTRA Awards (Vancouver)	1	1
Vancouver Film Critics Circle	0	1
Wins	9
Nominations	19

Year	Nominated work	Award	Category	Result	Ref.
2006	Michael Eklund - Zixx: Level Two for episode "Welcome to the Funhouse"	Leo Awards	Best Performance in a Youth or Children's Program or Series	Nominated	
2006	Michael Eklund - The Entrance	Eerie Horror Fest	Best Actor	Won	
2007	Michael Eklund - The Entrance	Leo Awards	Best Lead Performance by a Male in a Feature Length Drama	Nominated	
2008	Michael Eklund - Smallville for episode "Combat"	Leo Awards	Best Guest Performance by a Male in a Dramatic Series	Nominated	
2008	Michael Eklund - Walk All over Me	Leo Awards	Best Supporting Performance by a Male in a Feature Length Drama	Won	
2010	Michael Eklund - The Making of Plus One	Leo Awards	Best Lead Performance by a Male in a Feature Length Drama	Nominated	
2011	Michael Eklund - Fringe for episode "The Plateau"	Leo Awards	Best Guest Performance by a Male in a Dramatic Series	Won	
2012	Michael Eklund - Errors of the Human Body	Fantastic Fest	Best Actor	Won	
2013	Michael Eklund - Alcatraz for episode "Kit Nelson"	Leo Awards	Best Guest Performance by a Male in a Dramatic Series	Nominated	
2013	Michael Eklund - Ferocious	Leo Awards	Best Supporting Performance by a Male in a Motion Picture	Nominated	
2013	Michael Eklund - Errors of the Human Body	Leo Awards	Best Lead Performance by a Male in a Feature Length Drama	Won	
2014	Michael Eklund - The Call	Leo Awards	Best Supporting Performance by a Male in a Motion Picture	Won	
2015	Michael Eklund - Primary	Leo Awards	Best Supporting Performance by a Male in a Motion Picture	Nominated	
2015	Michael Eklund - Eadweard	Leo Awards	Best Lead Performance by a Male in a Motion Picture	Nominated	
2015	Michael Eklund - Eadweard	UBCP/ACTRA Awards (Vancouver)	Best Actor	Won	
2015	Michael Eklund - Eadweard	Vancouver Film Critics Circle	Best Actor in a Canadian Film	Nominated	
2015	Michael Eklund - Eadweard	Alhambra Film Festival	Best Actor	Won	
2017	Michael Eklund - Dead Draw	Leo Awards	Best Lead Performance by a Male in a Motion Picture	Nominated	
2019	Michael Eklund - Van Helsing for episode "Crooked Steps"	Leo Awards	Best Guest Performance by a Male in a Dramatic Series	Won	
