= Bill & Ted's Excellent Adventures (1992 TV series) =

- Based on: Bill & Ted's Excellent Adventure by Chris Matheson and Ed Solomon
- Developed by: Clifton Campbell
- Starring: Evan Richards; Christopher Kennedy
- Composer: Nathan Wang
- Country of origin: United States
- Original language: English
- No. of seasons: 1
- No. of episodes: 7 (and 1 unaired pilot)

Production
- Running time: 22–24 minutes
- Production companies: Innuendo Productions; Nelson Entertainment; Lorimar Television; Orion Television (unaired pilot only)

Original release
- Network: Fox
- Release: June 28 – August 9, 1992

Related
- Bill & Ted's Excellent Adventures (1990 TV series)

Bill & Ted's Excellent Adventures is an American teen sitcom created by Clifton Campbell that aired on Fox, much like the second season of the animated series of the same name, from June 28 to August 9, 1992. It was based on the similarly titled 1989 film, and is part of the Bill & Ted franchise. The series follows the misadventures of two time-traveling slackers as they travel into the distant past and future.

The series is co-owned by Amazon MGM Studios and Warner Bros. Discovery via Orion Television and Lorimar Television libraries respectively.

== Overview ==
After the DIC Entertainment animated series was cancelled, it was replaced by a live-action follow-up of the same name. The series was set to air during the 1991–92 television season, but production was delayed until Bill & Ted's Bogus Journey made a profit at the box office. The series was filmed in Vancouver, BC, Canada for financial considerations and ended up airing in the summer of 1992.

== Cast ==
=== Main ===
- Evan Richards as Bill S. Preston Esq.
- Christopher Kennedy as Ted "Theodore" Logan
- Rick Overton as Rufus
- Danny Breen as Mr. Keilson
- Don Lake as Mr. Preston
- Lisa Wilcox as Missy Preston
- Matt Landers as Captain Logan

=== Guest stars ===
- Diedrich Bader as Arthur (in "Nail the Conquering Hero")
- Todd McDurmont as Elvis Presley (in "Hunka Hunka Bill and Ted")
- Tom McBeath as Sheriff (in "Deja Vu")
- Arte Johnson as Albert Einstein (in "Stand Up Guy")
- Don Ackerman as Glen Nevis (in "Stand Up Guy")

== Episodes ==
No.	Title	Directed by	Written by	Original release date	Prod. code
N–A	"Original Pilot"	Andy Tennant	Story by : Savage Steve Holland & Darren Star; Teleplay by : Darren Star	N/A	N/A
1	"Nail the Conquering Hero"	Christopher T. Welch	Clifton Campbell	June 28, 1992	475508/447401
2	"As the Dude Turns"	Christopher T. Welch	Clifton Campbell	July 5, 1992	475508/447405
3	"It's a Totally Wonderful Life"	David Nutter	Adam Markowitz & Bill Freiberger	July 12, 1992	475508/447406
4	"Hunka Hunka Bill & Ted"	Kristoffer Tabori	Steve Hollander & Paul Bernbaum	July 19, 1992	475508/447407
5	"Destiny Babes"	Kristoffer Tabori	Joel Surnow	July 26, 1992	475508/447403
6	"Deja Vu"	David Nutter	Clifton Campbell & Bruce Kirschbaum	August 2, 1992	475508/447402
7	"Stand Up Guy"	Todd Holland	Eric Paul Jones	August 9, 1992	475508/447404

== Reception ==
Carole Kucharewicz of Variety, although praising the special effects, criticized the acting and ultimately gave a negative review, stating: "Taking two-dimensional teen time travelers and making a movie was a good idea and it made lots of money. Taking one-dimensional teen time travelers and making a weekly series is not a good idea and it's not a compelling enough reason for parents to let their youngsters take over the TV from 60 Minutes reruns."
