= Bill & Ted's Excellent Adventure =

1989 film by Stephen Herek

- Theatrical release poster
- Directed by: Stephen Herek
- Written by: Chris Matheson; Ed Solomon
- Produced by: Scott Kroopf; Michael S. Murphey; Joel Soisson
- Starring: Keanu Reeves; Alex Winter; George Carlin
- Cinematography: Timothy Suhrstedt
- Edited by: Larry Bock; Patrick Rand
- Music by: David Newman
- Production companies: Nelson Entertainment; Interscope Communications; Soisson/Murphey Productions; De Laurentiis Film Partners
- Distributed by: Orion Pictures (United States); De Laurentiis Entertainment Group (International)
- Release date: February 17, 1989
- Running time: 90 minutes
- Country: United States
- Language: English
- Budget: $10 million
- Box office: $40.5 million

Bill & Ted's Excellent Adventure is a 1989 American science fiction comedy film directed by Stephen Herek and written by Chris Matheson and Ed Solomon. The first installment of the Bill & Ted franchise, it stars Keanu Reeves, Alex Winter and George Carlin. The film follows two metalhead slacker high school students, Bill (Winter) and Ted (Reeves), who travel through time to assemble historical figures for their high-school history presentation.

It received positive reviews and was a modest box-office success, grossing $40 million against a $10 million budget. Winter and Reeves reprised their roles in two sequels: Bill & Ted's Bogus Journey (1991) and Bill & Ted Face the Music (2020).

== Plot ==
In 2688, humanity exists as a utopian society due to the inspiration of the music and philosophy of the Two Great Ones: William "Bill" S. Preston, Esq., and Ted "Theodore" Logan. One of the citizens, Rufus, is tasked by the leaders to travel back to San Dimas, California in 1988 using a phone booth-shaped time machine to ensure that the young Bill and Ted, two dim-witted high school students, successfully pass history class. The boys are on the brink of failing the course and out of school, and their only hope of passing is if they get a perfect score on their final history report, in which they must give an oral presentation on how historical figures would view the present San Dimas. If they fail, Ted's disagreeable father, police Captain Logan, plans to ship Ted to a military school in Alaska, ending Bill and Ted's fledgling band, Wyld Stallyns, and altering history.

Rufus finds the duo at a Circle K, struggling to finish their report and offers help before another phone-booth time machine arrives and future versions of Bill and Ted step out. After assuring the present-day Bill and Ted that Rufus's claims are valid and that they can trust him, they disappear in the time booth.

Rufus shows Bill and Ted how to operate the time booth, taking them back to 1805, where they find Napoleon Bonaparte leading his forces against Austria. As Rufus, Bill, and Ted return to the present, Napoleon gets thrown by a cannonball explosion into their wake and gets dragged through the Circuits of Time along with them. Rufus explains that time will progress normally for Bill and Ted and that they cannot miss their class presentation the next day. He then departs, leaving the empty time booth for them. As they discuss where to go next, they discover Napoleon stuck in a nearby tree, inspiring them to abduct historical figures and take them to the present for their school presentation. They leave Napoleon with Ted's younger brother Deacon and ask him to take Napoleon out to town before they go.

They befriend Billy the Kid in the Wild West and Socrates in ancient Greece before stopping in 15th-century England, where they fall in love with princesses Joanna and Elizabeth. Their father tries to have them executed, but Billy and Socrates help them escape. The booth, its antenna damaged by an attacking knight in the process, takes them to 2688, where they discover that society reveres them and their future band. They are inspired to complete their report with "extra credit" by abducting Sigmund Freud, Ludwig van Beethoven, Joan of Arc, Genghis Khan, and Abraham Lincoln. After a brief stop in prehistoric times to repair the antenna, they program the booth to return to the present, but end up outside Circle K the night before, where Rufus first introduced himself. They convince their earlier selves of Rufus's trustworthiness before he explains how to get to the next day; he further warns them that they have only two hours left before their history report is due.

When they arrive at the current time, they leave the historical figures at the local mall to learn about San Dimas while looking for Napoleon. After learning that Deacon has abandoned Napoleon at a bowling alley, Bill and Ted track him to a local water park. Back at the mall, the historical figures become fascinated but also overwhelmed by San Dimas culture, and are soon arrested for inadvertently causing mayhem. Captain Logan, determined to break up Bill and Ted's friendship, refuses to release their historical figures and orders Ted to start packing up for military school.

The boys execute an escape plan based on using the time booth in the future to set up what they need in the present. They break their friends out of jail, then present each to the assembled school using stage lighting effects and rousing music. Their "report" earns a standing ovation, they pass the course, and they return the historical figures to their own times.

Sometime later, Rufus returns, accompanied by the two princesses he has rescued from arranged marriages. He says that they will also be part of Wyld Stallyns and that the four of them will change the world with their music. He asks to jam with them, but on hearing their fledgling attempts to play, he turns to the movie audience and assures them "They do get better."

== Cast ==
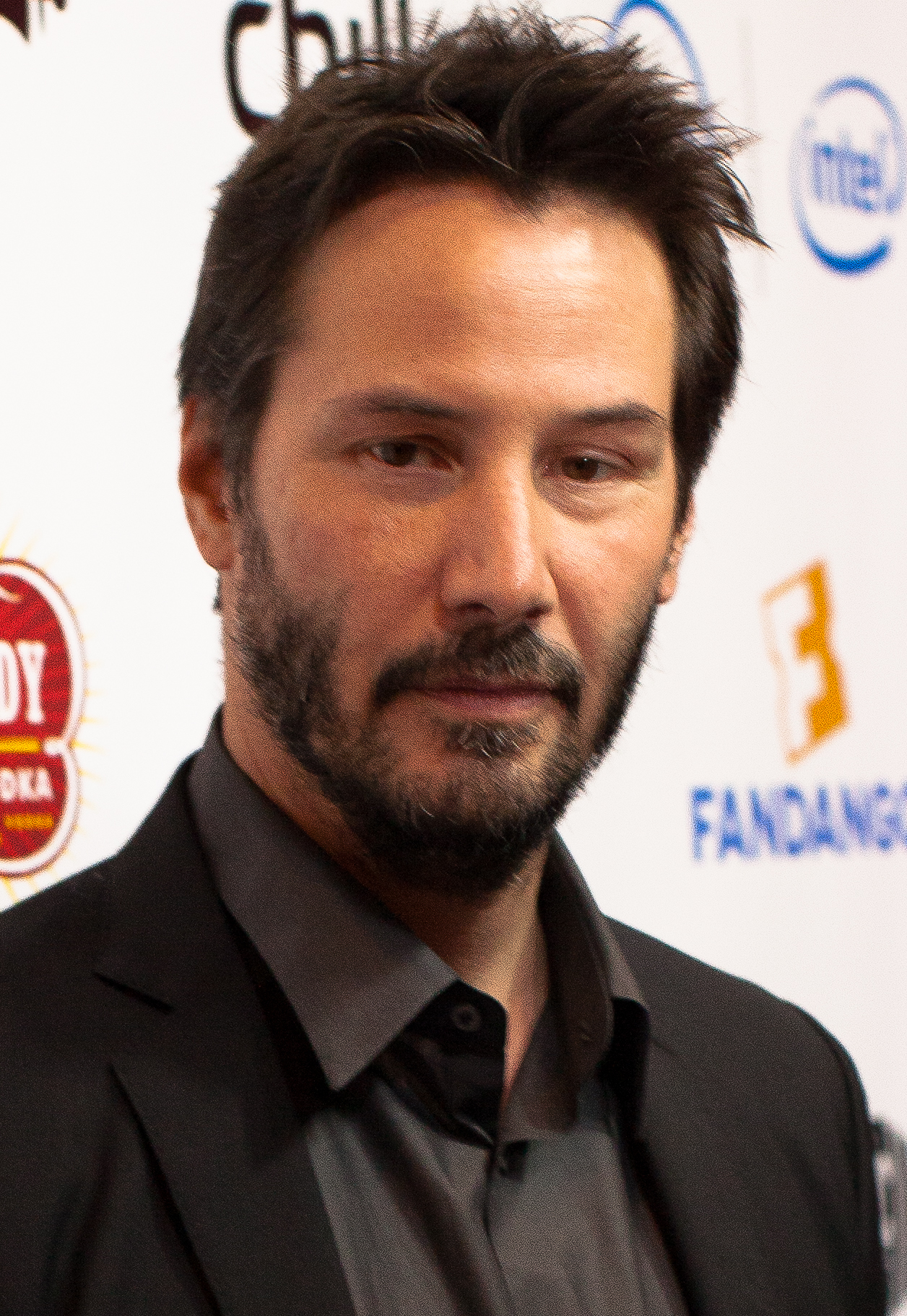
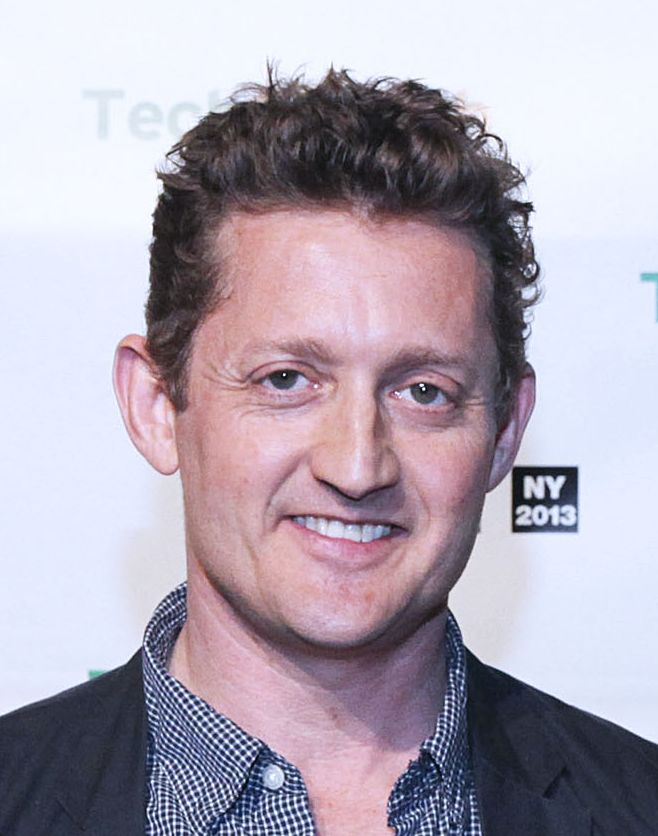
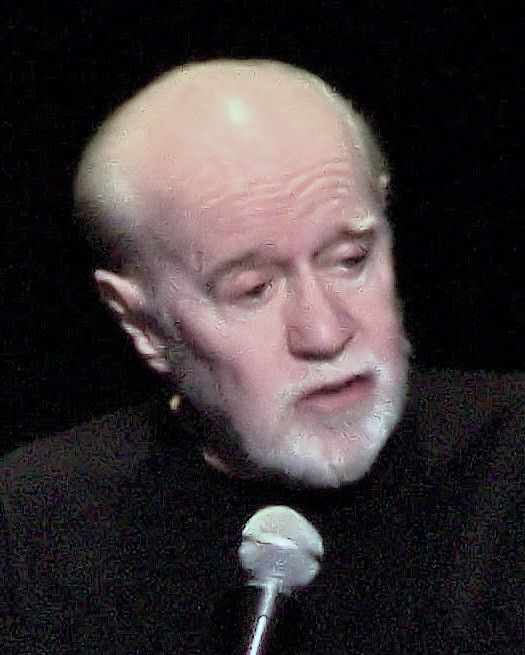
Keanu Reeves (left), Alex Winter (center), and George Carlin (right)
- Alex Winter as Bill S. Preston, Esq., a member of Wyld Stallyns
- Keanu Reeves as Ted "Theodore" Logan, a member of Wyld Stallyns
- George Carlin as Rufus, a man from the future who is sent to help Bill and Ted
- Terry Camilleri as Napoleon Bonaparte
- Dan Shor as Billy the Kid
- Tony Steedman as Socrates
- Rod Loomis as Sigmund Freud
- Al Leong as Genghis Khan
- Jane Wiedlin as Joan of Arc
- Robert V. Barron as Abraham Lincoln
- Clifford David as Ludwig van Beethoven
- Hal Landon Jr. as Captain Logan, Ted and Deacon's father who works as a police captain
- Bernie Casey as Mr. Ryan, Bill and Ted's history teacher
- Amy Stock-Poynton as Missy/Mom, Bill's stepmother
- J. Patrick McNamara as Mr. Preston, Bill's father
- Frazier Bain as Deacon Logan, Ted's younger brother
- John Karlsen as Evil Duke
- Diane Franklin as Princess Joanna
- Kimberley LaBelle as Princess Elizabeth
- Clarence Clemons, Martha Davis, and Fee Waybill as The Three Most Important People in the World, three future people seated in thrones

== Production ==
=== Writing ===
The screenplay was written by Ed Solomon and Chris Matheson in early 1987, based on a comedy stand-up routine they had performed in college. Director Stephen Herek called the screenplay "incredibly laugh-out-loud", but recognized that because some of the humour targeted a specific audience, the film was "either going to be a huge hit or a huge flop". He has said that shopping the film for distributors was difficult; Warner Bros. wanted to produce it within a US$10 million budget, but could not figure out how to fund it. The film was eventually picked up by Dino De Laurentiis through the De Laurentiis Entertainment Group (DEG).

In a 1991 interview, co-writer Ed Solomon said the characters of Bill and Ted were originally seen as "14-year-old skinny guys, with low-rider bell-bottoms and heavy metal T-shirts" who were despised by the popular kids at school. Casting Reeves and Winter changed the filmmakers' images of the characters because "...once you cast Alex and Keanu, who look like pretty cool guys, that was hard to believe".

Originally as a spec script, the film was called Bill & Ted's Time Van. The core plot was similar, with Bill and Ted on the verge of failing their history class, ruining their plans to form a band. However, it deviated from the film version when they borrowed a van from their 28-year-old friend Rufus. While driving the van, they end up in Nazi Germany; and after some hijinks, bring Adolf Hitler back to present-day San Dimas before continuing to collect other historical figures. Solomon said this approach became problematic, and Hitler was switched out with Napoleon in their final script. Other ideas in the spec script that were dropped included more involvement of Bill and Ted's classmates, including having them time-travel with them; visiting Julius Caesar in the Roman Empire and ending up causing his death; and helping a prehistoric caveman invent fire so that they could light up a joint. The van, a 1969 Chevrolet, was abandoned as it was considered too similar to the DeLorean used in the Back to the Future trilogy. It was later replaced with a phone booth—which, contrary to common belief, was not intended as a reference to the TARDIS from the British sci-fi show Doctor Who. (Matheson said, "All of us were so clueless and knew nothing about Doctor Who.") In earlier drafts of the script, other historical figures Bill and Ted plucked from history included Charlemagne (whom they referred to as "Charlie Mangay"), Babe Ruth, and a non-famous medieval person called John the Serf (who is nonetheless listed in the credits).

=== Casting ===
Herek screened between 200 and 300 actors for the main roles, asking actors to try for both parts during auditions. Pauly Shore and Gary Riley were among the hundreds of actors considered for the role of Ted, while Matt Adler, River Phoenix, Donovan Leitch, Gary Riley, Sean Penn and then-upcoming actor Brendan Fraser reportedly auditioned for Bill.

Keanu Reeves was one of the first to audition, and Herek quickly identified him as their Ted, making much of the rest of casting to find a match against Reeves. Alongside Reeves, 24 actors were called back and auditioned in various pairs to find a good chemistry. On that day, Reeves was one of the first to arrive along with Alex Winter, and while waiting for the auditions to start, found out they had a lot of personal details in common, such as a common interest in bass guitar and motorcycles. They quickly developed a rapport between each other during auditions, which earned them the title roles. A longstanding urban legend has it that Reeves auditioned for Bill and Winter for Ted. According to Winter, the story emerged because the characters are so similar, and even he and Reeves sometimes became confused about who was who.

Through rehearsals, Winter and Reeves worked on developing their characters to move them away from being stereotypical comedic slackers and insert sincerity and other more human elements into them. Although they developed mannerisms outside of the script, influenced partially by British comedians like Peter Sellers and Spike Milligan, the pair kept to the dialogue written by Solomon and Mathseon, with Winter calling it "very floral, so paradoxical to how you think dumb Valley guys would speak". Winter said that to develop Bill's character, he borrowed from the looks and trends along Venice Beach, California, where he had been living, including wearing a baseball cap backwards and pulling part of his hair through that opening.

Winter described the casting of George Carlin as Rufus as a "very happy accident". The role of Rufus had not been established when filming started. Herek stated that their intention was to have Eddie Van Halen as Rufus, given the frequency of Van Halen references in the screenplay, but this was not possible because of the low budget for the film. They started looking at other actors who would fit the rock motif, making a short list that had included Ringo Starr, Roger Daltrey, Sean Connery, and Charlie Sheen. They soon recognized that no one on this list was a comedian, except for perhaps Starr. Producers Scott Kroopf and Bob Cort had just finished filming Outrageous Fortune, which co-starred George Carlin, and, with the film's production nearly complete, were able to get him to complete filming.

The Three Most Important People in the utopian society were envisioned to be portrayed by the band members of ZZ Top. However, Solomon had connections to the E Street Band, The Tubes and The Motels, and were able to get Clarence Clemons, Fee Waybill, and Martha Davis, respectively, for the Most Important People.

The film's writers, Solomon and Matheson, appear in the film's ice cream scene as the "stupid" and "ugly" waiters, respectively. When Rufus plays his guitar solo, the hands in the close-up are those of Stevie Salas, who composed the film's guitar music.

=== Filming ===
The film was shot on a US$8.5 million budget over a period of 10 weeks, including two weeks in Italy. As Herek was going after the same comedic approach to history as in Monty Python and the Holy Grail, they brought in its production designer, Roy Forge Smith, for this film. Principal filming was shot in 1987 in the Phoenix, Arizona and Tempe, Arizona metropolitan areas. Many scenes were filmed in and around Scottsdale's Coronado High School. Coronado's auditorium was torn down during 2005-07 renovations, but its unique roof and intricate exterior mosaic, seen in an opening scene when Bill and Ted leave school in a red Mustang, was saved and moved, piece by piece, to the new auditorium. The interior shots of the auditorium were filmed inside the East High School auditorium, which was in Phoenix on 48th Street just north of Van Buren. East High School was demolished in 2002 as part of a redevelopment project. The production also shot a sequence on the Western Street on the back lot of Southwestern Studio in Carefree, Arizona, as well as the scenes set in the future.

The scenes at the fictional "Waterloops" water park (a play on the battle at Waterloo) are a combination of establishing shots at Raging Waters in San Dimas and shots with the actors at Golfland Sunsplash in Mesa, Arizona. Because of the limited budget, the production could not close down the waterparks for filming, and thus, all those in the background of these shots were paying customers to the waterparks on those days. The bowling alley was a Fair Lanes-branded alley at that time but is now the AMF Tempe Village Lanes on Rural Road at SR 360 (now signed as US 60), three miles south of Arizona State University. The mall was Phoenix Metrocenter, between Peoria and Dunlap Avenues at Interstate 17. It closed on June 30, 2020. The Circle K store is at the intersection of Southern and Hardy in Tempe. An empty office building in Scottsdale served as the police station.

Additional filming took place at selected locations in Italy, including Odescalchi castle standing in as the Evil Duke's castle.

The film also employs computer-generated imagery for the scenes where Bill and Ted are traveling through the "Circuits of Time", created by the VFX house Perpetual Motion Pictures in Tempe. Winter called the experience of filming these sequences difficult because in order to come up with the desired effects, the filming required multiple people to stand inside the booth, which was on a gimbal in front of a green screen. Numerous equipment and prop failures ensued, and Reeves has called it "a death ride canoe from the worst carny ride you've ever been on".

=== Post-production ===
Initially, the film had ended with Bill and Ted giving their report within a small classroom, passing their class, and then going to the prom with the rescued princesses. The production team recognized this felt underwhelming, and created the larger auditorium presentation as to give a better sense of scale, with a sound and light show to make a more dramatic setting.

The initial cut of the film was 2 hours and 25 minutes long, and was pruned significantly. One such filmed scene was a lengthy choreographed song number that would have led off the film, starting with Bill and Ted dancing via air-guitaring on their way to school and ending up getting bullied by jocks once they arrive. In February 2020, Winter found some stills from the filmed version of the scene on an old hard drive and shared them on the Internet with some additional details on its production. Winter believed that Kenny Ortega had been involved in establishing the choreography based on the time period and his recollection. Winter said neither he nor Reeves could dance prior to shooting this scene, so the scene was rehearsed for roughly an hour a day across several weeks concurrent to other parts of filming. Winter identified other scenes that he recalled filming that had been cut, including a scene involving a prom, and a running gag involving the pudding cups and the "John the Serf" character that remained in the film's credits. While they had tried to find the film reels with this cut footage, Winter said that with the fate of DEG following the film, it is likely lost.

The picture had been planned for a 1988 release, and filming and production had completed on schedule. However, the original film distributor, DEG, fell into significant debt in late 1987, and by 1988 had filed for bankruptcy. At this point, the film was in post-production, and Herek attempted to show around the rough cut to other distributors. Herek said many of these companies were confused, asking him "Are there kids that really speak like this?" on seeing the film. However, the cut had an extremely popular reaction from a test audience of volunteers pulled from local malls, which led to a small bidding war from production companies to get the title. Some of the former DEG executives ended up at Nelson Entertainment, and along with Orion Pictures, were able to secure new distribution rights for the film by 1988 for about US$1 million.

== Home media ==
Bill & Ted's Excellent Adventure was released on VHS on August 31, 1989, and on DVD on December 4, 2001. It was released on Blu-ray on November 13, 2012. It was released on Ultra HD Blu Ray on October 11, 2022. All three Bill & Ted movies were released in a Ultra HD Blu Ray box set on August 8, 2024.

== Reception ==
=== Box office ===
Bill & Ted's Excellent Adventure had its theatrical release on February 17, 1989 and grossed $40.4 million domestically on a budget of about $10 million.

=== Critical response ===
On Rotten Tomatoes, the film holds an approval rating of 83% based on 58 reviews, with an average rating of 6.90/10. The website's critical consensus reads: "Keanu Reeves and Alex Winter are just charming, goofy, and silly enough to make this fluffy time-travel Adventure work". On Metacritic, the film holds a weighted average score of 50 out of 100, based on 16 critics, indicating "mixed or average" reviews.

The Washington Post gave the film a negative review, finding the script written by Chris Matheson and Ed Solomon as "made only the sketchiest attempts to draw their historical characters. They exist as foils and nothing else, and the gags that are hung on them are far from first-rate", and that if director "Stephen Herek, has any talent for comedy, it's not visible here. More than anything, the picture looks paltry and undernourished." Variety wrote about each historical figure that Bill & Ted meet, stating that "Each encounter is so brief and utterly cliched that history has little chance to contribute anything to this pic's two dimensions." Vincent Canby of The New York Times referred to the film as a "painfully inept comedy" and that the "one dimly interesting thing about Bill and Ted's Excellent Adventure is the way the two teen-age heroes communicate in superlatives. We are about to fail most egregiously, says Ted to Bill, or maybe it's Bill to Ted. They are also fond of odd words, such as bodacious." In the Los Angeles Times, Chris Willman was also unimpressed, concluding: "Make no mistake, Bill & Ted's Excellent Adventure [...] is not a satire of mindlessness; it's unabashed glorification of dumbness for dumbness' sake. Bill and Ted are heroic in their ability to reduce some of history's great minds to their level." However, writing for Radio Times, Alan Jones decided: "A nonstop giggle from start to finish, this beguiling grab-bag of time-travel clichés, hard-rock music and Valley-speaking cool dudes is a flawless, purpose-built junk movie".

The successes of the film and the animated series spawned a short-lived breakfast cereal called Bill & Ted's Excellent Cereal.

A phone booth used in the sequel was given away in a contest presented by Nintendo Power magazine, to promote Bill & Ted's Excellent Video Game Adventure. It was won by Kenneth Grayson of Mississippi.

In 2010, the city of San Dimas celebrated 50 years of incorporation. The celebration's slogan was San Dimas, 1960–2010 – An Excellent Adventure.

Bill and Ted's Excellent Adventure was selected as number 8 in Rolling Stone's '10 Best Stoner Movies of All Time' in 2013.

Writing in The Guardian on the occasion of the film's 25th anniversary, Hadley Freeman found: "Of all the delightfully improbable scenarios depicted in Bill & Ted's Excellent Adventure – from Napoleon Bonaparte causing havoc on a waterslide to Billy the Kid and Socrates (a.k.a. "So-crayts", of course) picking up chicks in a California mall to George Carlin acting in a film alongside Keanu Reeves and a member of the Go-Go's – none would have seemed more unlikely on its release than the idea that one day, with much media fanfare, the public would be celebrating the film's 25th anniversary. By the time Bill & Ted's Excellent Adventure was released in 1989, the 80s teen film explosion was starting to taper out. [...] Moreover, there had already been plenty of films about time-travelling teens by the time Bill & Ted rocked up in cinemas, such as Peggy Sue Got Married and Back to the Future. Few who were around then would have bet that a goofy movie about a pair of California metalheads skipping back through time in a phonebox collecting historical characters to bring back to 20th-century California for their history report would still be remembered today. But I am very much among those few".

The film is recognized by American Film Institute in these lists:

- 2005: AFI's 100 Years...100 Movie Quotes:
  - Bill/Ted: "Excellent!" – Nominated

=== In cultural analysis ===
Writing in British Sunday newspaper The Observer, Tom Holland noted,

Bill & Ted's Excellent Adventure does not tend to be rated as one of cinema's profounder treatments of the relationship between present and past. The story of two Californian slackers with a time machine who, for complicated reasons, have to assemble assorted celebrities from history in order to pass a high-school project, it is chiefly remembered for bringing Keanu Reeves to the attention of a mass audience. Classicists, however, will always cherish it as the only film ever to combine the music of Van Halen with Greek philosophy. When Bill and Ted embark on their quest, what should be their first destination if not classical Athens, and who should be the very first 'historical dude' bundled into their time machine if not a bald-headed man in a sheet whom they persist in calling 'Soh-kraytz'?" (Holland inaccurately names Socrates as the first historical figure Bill and Ted encounter, when it is actually Napoleon Bonaparte.)

Holland continued:

Even to metalheads, then, the philosophy of ancient Greece serves as something that is both primal and emblematic of civilisation as a whole. Socrates, in particular, the 'lover of wisdom' who insisted that the most fundamental presumptions of his countrymen should be subjected to experimental investigation, and who ended up being made to drink hemlock for his pains, has always been admired as the very fountainhead of rationalism. Yet when it comes to identifying what he taught and believed, there is a problem, on which Bill & Ted's Excellent Adventure, rather unexpectedly, puts its finger. Socrates, transplanted to 1980s California, can only communicate with his abductors by gesturing and gurning – since Bill and Ted, it goes without saying, speak not a word of ancient Greek. Even the miracle of time travel, it appears, cannot serve to alter what is, for any historian, a most awkward fact: that it is impossible to be certain of what Socrates actually said.

=== Fashion history ===
"Bill & Ted's Excellent Adventure is many things: a time-traveling buddy comedy, an early Keanu Reeves vehicle, and—according to at least one expert—the standard for Regency period costuming on film. Fashion historian Hilary Davidson created the Bill & Ted test after noticing that a scene in which the two slackers kidnap Ludwig van Beethoven features surprisingly well-executed costumes for the era."

Davidson described being impressed at the authenticity of the costuming of the scenes set in Beethoven's time, after seeing the movie. Since even the background characters in those scenes were wearing quite authentic costumes, it seemed to her like an accessible and accurate measuring stick for the quality of period authentic costumes in movies. According to Davidson, "If a production's main costumes are less well done than those of the extras in a minor part of a 1980s teen comedy movie, we have a problem."

== Soundtrack ==
Bill & Ted's Excellent Adventure (Original Motion Picture Soundtrack)

Soundtrack album by various artists
- Released: 1989
- Genres: Glam metal; pop rock; funk
- Length: 40:32
- Label: A&M Records

The film's soundtrack was released in 1989. The tracks are as follows:

1. "Play with Me" by Extreme
2. "The Boys and Girls Are Doing It" by Vital Signs
3. "Not So Far Away" by Glen Burtnik
4. "Dancing with a Gypsy" by Tora Tora
5. "Father Time" by Shark Island
6. "Breakaway" by Big Pig
7. "Dangerous" by Shark Island
8. "Walk Away" by Bricklin
9. "In Time" by Robbie Robb featuring Stevie Salas
10. "Two Heads Are Better Than One" by Power Tool

These tracks are ordered for the album differently than they are in the movie. In the movie, the songs appear in the following order: "Breakaway", "Dancing with a Gypsy", "Father Time", "Dangerous", "In Time", "Two Heads Are Better Than One", "The Boys and Girls Are Doing It", "Play with Me", "Walk Away", "Not So Far Away" and "Two Heads" (reprised over the credits).

The following songs appeared in the film but were not included in the soundtrack:

- "No Right to Do Me Wrong" by Range War
- "Party Up" by Rori
- "Bad Guitar" by Stevie 'No Wonder' Salas
- "Carlin's Solo" by Stevie Salas
- "Game of War" by Warrant

== Related productions ==
=== Sequels ===
A theatrical sequel, Bill & Ted's Bogus Journey, was released in 1991.

A third theatrical film in the Bill & Ted franchise was planned, and a screenplay was written, but never got past the pre-production phase. Although rumors claimed that the script was adapted into the 1996 film Bio-Dome, Alex Winter has said that it was not.

In 2010, Reeves indicated that Matheson and Solomon were working on a script for a third film, confirming in April 2011 that a draft was complete. Winter said in March 2012 that he and Reeves both liked the finished script, which revisits the two characters after the changes of the past 20 years. The script did not feature the return of the Grim Reaper from Bogus Journey; but when actor William Sadler expressed interest, the writers considered ways to include the character. In August 2012, Dean Parisot (director of the sci-fi/comedy film Galaxy Quest) signed on to direct, although MGM, which held the rights to the Bill & Ted franchise, did not officially green-light the film until several years later. In an April 2014 article on the original film's 25th anniversary, Alex Winter reported that work on moving the third film forward was still in progress.

Bill & Ted Face the Music was officially announced to be in pre-production on May 8, 2018. On March 20, 2019, a video featuring Winter and Reeves was posted online which announced that the franchise's third film would be released in the summer of 2020. After a delay due to the COVID-19 coronavirus pandemic, it was released on August 28, 2020.

=== Television ===
Two spin-off television series were produced, both titled Bill & Ted's Excellent Adventures.

- Bill & Ted's Excellent Adventures was an animated series that first ran on CBS in 1990, and featured the voices of Winter, Reeves and Carlin returning to their film roles. A second season of eight episodes ran on Fox Kids, with the voice cast of Fox's then-upcoming live-action series.
- Bill & Ted's Excellent Adventures was a live-action series that ran only seven episodes on Fox in the summer of 1992. It did not feature any of the film cast. Evan Richards and Christopher Kennedy played Bill and Ted.

=== Comics ===
DC Comics produced a tie-in comic following the plot of the first movie timed to coincide with that film's release on home video. The sequel was adapted by DC's competitor Marvel Comics, published to coincide with the second film's release in theaters. Its popularity led to the ongoing Marvel series Bill & Ted's Excellent Comic Book by Evan Dorkin, which lasted for 12 issues.

There was a weekly 2/4 page semi-adaptation of the animated series published for a year by UK's defunct Look-In Magazine from 1991 to 1992.

=== Video games ===
There were also Game Boy, NES, and Atari Lynx games released, which were very loosely based on the film's plot.

A PC title and nearly identical Amiga and Commodore 64 port were made in 1991 by Off the Wall Productions and IntraCorp, Inc. under contract by Capstone Software and followed the original film very closely.

=== Theme parks ===
The annual Halloween Horror Nights events at Universal Studios Orlando and Hollywood have featured since 1992 (Orlando) and 1997-1999/2007 (Hollywood) Bill & Ted's Excellent Halloween Adventure, a show satirizing pop culture of the year with Bill & Ted as the protagonists fighting villains who steal their phone booth for their own schemes. The show differs from year to year, with spoofs of various pop culture icons. The main plot involves Bill and Ted being threatened by an evil villain from a popular film of that year, with appearances by a host of villains, heroes, and celebrities. The show usually includes elaborate dance numbers, stunts, and multiple double-entendres for the late night event crowd.

In 2013, the Hollywood version of the show was canceled in the middle of its run following complaints of homophobic humor. On August 15, 2017, Universal announced that 2017 would be the final year of Bill and Ted's Excellent Halloween Adventure in Orlando. On November 4, 2017, Bill and Ted's Excellent Halloween Adventure came to a final close, but not before a surprise appearance of Rufus.

== See also ==
- Deus ex machina
- Novikov self-consistency principle
