= Bill & Ted's Excellent Adventures (1990 TV series) =

1990 animated television series spin-off

- Genre: Fantasy; Science fiction Comedy; Adventure
- Based on: Bill & Ted's Excellent Adventure by Chris Matheson and Ed Solomon
- Developed by: Gordon Kent
- Directed by: Ray Patterson (season 1); Don Lusk (season 1); Paul Sommer (season 1); Robert Alvarez (season 1); Carl Urbano (season 1); Stan Phillips (season 2)
- Voices of: Keanu Reeves; Alex Winter; George Carlin; Christopher Kennedy; Evan Richards
- Theme music composer: Randy Petersen; Kevin Quinn
- Opening theme: Bill & Ted's Excellent Adventures
- Composers: Chuck Loeb (season 1); Murray McFadden & Timothy Mulholland (season 2)
- Countries of origin: United States; Canada
- Original language: English
- No. of seasons: 2
- No. of episodes: 21

Production
- Executive producers: David Kirschner (season 1); Paul Sabella (season 1); Andy Heyward (season 2)
- Running time: 20–23 minutes
- Production companies: Hanna-Barbera Productions (season 1); DIC Enterprises (season 2); Orion Television Entertainment; Nelson Entertainment

Original release
- Network: CBS
- Release: September 15 – December 22, 1990
- Network: Fox (Fox Kids)
- Release: September 14 – November 16, 1991

Related
- Bill & Ted's Excellent Adventures (1992 TV series)

Bill & Ted's Excellent Adventures is a 1990 animated television series spin-off from the 1989 film Bill & Ted's Excellent Adventure. It follows the titular protagonists, dimwitted teenage musicians Bill and Ted, who are visited by Rufus, a man from the future, who needs them to graduate from high school to start a rock band that inspires the people of the future. They travel to various time periods, making sure that history happens as it should, more or less.

== Overview ==
The first season of the animated series was produced by Hanna-Barbera and aired on CBS in 1990, with Keanu Reeves, Alex Winter, George Carlin, and Bernie Casey reprising their film roles.

For the second season in 1991, the animated series switched production companies and networks, now airing on Fox Kids, and produced by DIC Animation City. As Fox was also planning on airing a new live-action version series with the same name, the cast was replaced, and the leads were now voiced by Evan Richards and Christopher Kennedy, the actors who would go on to portray Bill and Ted on the short-lived 1992 live-action television series. The new episodes introduced a "Squint" phone booth that could take Bill and Ted into literature, television shows, and (after shrinking them) inside the human body. The new show had trouble catching on, and after one more season, the animated Bill & Ted series was cancelled.

== Cast ==
=== Hanna-Barbera version (1990) ===
- Alex Winter as William "Bill" S. Preston, Esq.
- Keanu Reeves as Theodore "Ted" Logan
- George Carlin as Rufus
- Bernie Casey as Mr. Ryan
- Danny Cooksey as Deacon Logan
- Peter Renaday as Detective Logan

==== Additional voices ====
- Joe Alaskey
- Ken Berry
- Roscoe Lee Browne
- Hamilton Camp
- Nancy Cartwright
- Brian Cummings
- Keene Curtis
- Jennifer Darling
- Jeannie Elias
- Bernard Erhard
- Pat Fraley
- Dick Gautier
- Joan Gerber
- Ernest Harada
- Phil Hartman
- Dana Hill
- Robert Ito
- Arte Johnson
- Vicki Juditz
- Zale Kessler
- Maurice LaMarche
- Lu Leonard
- Page Leong
- Sherry Lynn
- Little Richard - Himself
- Dave Madden
- Kenneth Mars
- Tress MacNeille
- Scott Menville
- Rob Paulsen
- Henry Polic II
- Clive Revill
- Bob Ridgely
- Kimmy Robertson as Missy Preston, Neferiti, Various
- William Schallert
- Kath Soucie
- Jeffrey Tambor
- Susan Tolsky
- B.J. Ward
- Jonathan Winters
- Anderson Wong

=== DIC version (1991) ===
- Evan Richards as Bill S. Preston, Esq.
- Christopher Kennedy as Ted "Theodore" Logan
- Rick Overton as Rufus

==== Additional voices ====
- Susan Boyd
- Tara Charendoff as Mary Jane
- Alyson Court
- Paulina Gillis
- Elizabeth Hanna
- Terri Hawkes
- Dan Hennessey
- Hadley Kay
- Don Lake
- Marilyn Lightstone
- Judy Marshak
- Tracey Moore
- Greg Morton
- Wayne Robson
- Susan Roman
- Andrew Sabiston
- Stuart Stone
- Greg Swanson
- Louise Vallance
- Marlow Vella
- Matthew Walker

== Episodes ==
=== Season 1 (1990) ===
No. overall	No. in season	Title	Written by	Original release date
1	1	"One Sweet & Sour Chinese Adventure – to Go"	John Loy and John Ludin	September 15, 1990
Bill and Ted play loud rock n' roll music and accidentally break a Chinese vase. To avoid getting in trouble, the dudes use their trusty phone booth time machine to go to ancient China to find a replacement where they also meet the famous Italian explorer Marco Polo. Historical Figures: Marco Polo
2	2	"The Birth of Rock & Roll or Too Hip for the Womb"	John Loy and John Ludin	September 22, 1990
Bill and Ted are flunking music appreciation and are given an assignment about classical music. They meet the young and mischievous Wolfgang Amadeus Mozart whom they have to babysit, and Little Richard (voiced by himself) back when he was washing dishes. They also travel to Switzerland and get in trouble with a local nobleman and meet history's greatest archer, William Tell. Historical Figures: Wolfgang Amadeus Mozart, Little Richard, William Tell
3	3	"A Most Excellent Roman Holiday"	Wayne Kaatz and Gordon Kent	September 29, 1990
The dudes are taking a Latin class and are given an assignment about a rare ancient Roman coin, and they end up going to Latin America in 1450 and Rome in 44 B.C. They also save Julius Caesar from being assassinated. Historical Figures: Pachacuti, Julius Caesar
4	4	"Model 'T' for Ted"	Rowby Goren	October 6, 1990
Ted is given driving lessons in his father's squad car. Later Bill and Ted borrow "Blue Betty" to drive 5 blocks to buy the new Iron Maiden CD, and he accidentally wrecks it, which leads to him and Bill going back in time to require some help. They also improve the first Thanksgiving feast, meet pirates and sea explorers like Sir Francis Drake, car pioneer Henry Ford and the inventors of the airplane, The Wright brothers. Historical Figures: Chief Massasoit, Francis Drake, Henry Ford, Wright brothers
5	5	"The More Heinous They are, the Harder They Fall"	Mary Jo Ludin	October 20, 1990
Bill and Ted use their phone booth to find a heinous bully to deal with a bully at Deacon's school. They try the English ruler Henry VIII of England, evil Russian czar Ivan the Terrible, cowgirl personality Calamity Jane, and American patriot Paul Revere. They even help start the American Revolution, kick off the Boston Tea Party, help Benjamin Franklin discover electricity, and sign the United States Declaration of Independence. Historical Figures: Henry VIII, Ivan the Terrible, Calamity Jane, Paul Revere, Samuel Adams, Benjamin Franklin, Thomas Jefferson
6	6	"Birds of A Feather Stick to the Roof of Your Mouth"	Sharman DiVono	October 27, 1990
The duo house-sit for an eccentric explorer named Mr. Stickler and a cat eats his most prized possession, a rare bird called "Prince Rupert III" which leads to finding a replacement. They also help polar explorer Richard E. Byrd fly across the South Pole, build a nose for the Sphinx, and help Mr. Henry Morton Stanley find Dr. David Livingstone. Historical Figures: Richard E. Byrd, Tutankhamun, Henry Morton Stanley, David Livingstone
7	7	"A Black Knight in San Dimas"	Rowby Goren	November 3, 1990
A new teacher named Ms. Spleen is fed up with Bill and Ted and threatens them with expelling them unless they can catch up with their homework. In order to get a great audience at their concert, they go back to get their old friends Joanna and Elizabeth from 15th century England, but end up in the Crusades with Muslim leader Saladin. Historical Figures: Saladin
8	8	"Pocket Watch Full of Miracles"	Doug Molitor	November 10, 1990
It's Mr. Preston's birthday and the dudes use their phone booth to get him a present: an antique pocket watch, but end up getting watches from Mr. Preston when he was 10 years old, folk hero John Henry, Swiss general Hannibal and the Empress of India, Queen Victoria. Historical Figures: John Henry, Hannibal, Queen Victoria
9	9	"This Babe Ruth "BABE" is A DUDE, Dude"	Sean Roche	November 24, 1990
The dudes are faced with lunchtime detention and accidentally wash off a signature off Coach Sweatsock's baseball which leads to meeting Babe Ruth, Harriet Tubman, and the famous vampire Count Dracula. Historical Figures: Babe Ruth, Harriet Tubman, Count Dracula
10	10	"When the Going Gets Tough Bill & Ted are History"	Paul Dini	December 1, 1990
Bill and Ted are fed up with not getting any applause after their fourth gig. They give up on the band, which disrupts time, causes Rufus to get younger and younger, and leads to Bill and Ted meeting famous inventor Thomas Edison, professional artist, thinker, scientist, and inventor Leonardo da Vinci, English chemist Joseph Priestley, and history's greatest sailor, Christopher Columbus. Historical Figures: Thomas Edison, Leonardo da Vinci, Joseph Priestley, Christopher Columbus
11	11	"Never the Twain Shall Meet"	Jim Thut	December 8, 1990
The dudes must find a person for Career Day, or "else". First they meet the greatest playwright ever, William Shakespeare, gold pioneer John Sutter, and American novelist and humorist Mark Twain. Historical Figures: William Shakespeare, John Sutter, Mark Twain
12	12	"A Job, a Job – My Kingdom for a Job"	Sean Roche	December 15, 1990
Bill and Ted must find a job, so they find jobs baking a cake for Marie Antoinette's birthday, help the Spanish explorer Juan de Oñate find the Lost City of Gold, help Lucrezia Borgia, and help write haikus with Matsuo Bashō. Historical Figures: Marie Antoinette, Juan de Oñate, Lucrezia Borgia, Matsuo Bashō
13	13	"A Grimm Story of an Overdue Book"	Rowby Goren	December 22, 1990
Ted is on the library's "Most Wanted" list for not returning a story written by the Brothers Grimm, so he and Bill scour the past to find a copy of the book, and they meet the actual Grimm Brothers, George Washington, Davy Crockett, and Lady Godiva. Historical Figures: Brothers Grimm, George Washington, Davy Crockett, Lady Godiva

=== Season 2 (1991) ===
This season featured historical characters like Giacomo Casanova, Elvis Presley, Theodoric and Martin Luther.

No. overall	No. in season	Title	Written by	Original release date
14	1	"Now Museum, Now You Don't"	Doug Molitor	September 14, 1991
The boys break the arms off the Venus de Milo and punch a hole in the Mona Lisa. Historical Figures: Alexandros of Antioch, Leonardo da Vinci
15	2	"The Totally Gross Anatomy of a Gym Teacher"	Rowby Goren	September 21, 1991
The boys get a new phone directory, but they forget to dial 1 and end up shrinking themselves while trying to help their gym teacher keep the weight off in the past. An Innerspace style adventure ensues.
16	3	"The Star Strangled Banner"	Jim Aitken	September 28, 1991
Missy's rendition of the national anthem will set back the Wyld Stallyns by 14 years so they head to the past to stop her. Historical Figures: Francis Scott Key
17	4	"Leave it to Bill and Ted"	Ellis Weiner	October 5, 1991
The boys use the new features of the phone booth to visit and meddle with the fictional world of "Leave it to Badger".
18	5	"Goodbye, Columbus... and America"	Perry Martin	October 12, 1991
Bill and Ted get sick of doing chores and decide that they need to go on a cruise and end up sailing to the "New World". They alter history and return to an undiscovered America. Historical Figures: Christopher Columbus
19	6	"It's a Bogus Day in the Neighborhood"	Alicia Marie Schudt	October 26, 1991
Deacon, Ted's brother, is sick and watching Thunder Slugs. The boys object to the content and introduce him to Mr. Radish's Condominium. They find out that Mr. Radish is planning to hang up his sweater so they set out to convince him to stay.
20	7	"Bill and Ted's Excellent Adventure in Babysitting"	Story by : Phil Harnage, Judy Rothman and Barbara Slade; Teleplay by : Barbara Slade	November 2, 1991
Ted's guitar melts putting the future at risk. If Bill and Ted need to find a new one before the Battle of the Bands.
21	8	"The Apple Doesn't Fall Far from the Phone Booth"	Kati Rocky	November 16, 1991
Ted's dad decides to send him to military school. The boys visit the past to learn some discipline from Ted's father so they can change his mind.

== Home media ==
The first episode of the first season was released as a special feature on the Bill & Ted's Most Excellent Collection DVD box set, and on the Blu-ray of Bill & Ted's Excellent Adventure.

In 2013, TGG Direct, LLC (under license from MGM Home Entertainment) released a 2 disc "Best of" DVD. Disc 1 includes eight episodes from Season 1, while Disc 2 has the complete second season. It was initially a Wal-Mart exclusive but has since been made available nationwide.
