= Chris Matheson =

Chris Matheson may refer to:

- Chris Matheson (screenwriter) (born 1960), American film director and screenwriter
- Chris Matheson (politician) (born 1968), British Member of Parliament
- Chris Matheson, Mayor of Gainesville, Florida from 1910–1917
