= Bill & Ted's Excellent Adventure (1989 video game) =

- Developer: Off The Wall Productions
- Publisher: Capstone
- Programmers: C64; James A. Dorsman; Richard Lamb; Eric Harlow; Mark Buda; Amiga; Scott Lahteine
- Composers: C64; Douglas E. Mackall; James A. Dorsman
- Platforms: Commodore 64, Amiga, MS-DOS
- Release: Commodore 64: NA: 1989; MS-DOS: NA: 1990; Amiga: NA: 1991
- Genre: Adventure
- Mode: Single-player

Bill & Ted's Excellent Adventure is a single player graphic adventure video game for the Commodore 64, Amiga, and MS-DOS. It was developed by Off the Wall Productions and published by Capstone Software. This video game is a part of the Bill & Ted franchise and the concept is based on the 1989 film Bill & Ted's Excellent Adventure.

== Gameplay ==
The player controls both Bill and Ted as they travel through different time periods, collect artifacts, and talk to locals to help find the historical figures for their oral report in present-day San Dimas. As in the film, if player does not finish the game in a set amount of time, the player fails the history report, thus losing the game.

== Release ==
Capstone started a trivia contest in Computer Gaming World magazine, consisting of 10 questions about the game. The reader had to answer the questions on a card and send it to Capstone. The first fifty readers to submit the most correct answers, won "Bill & Ted" T-shirts.

== See also ==
- Bill & Ted's Excellent Video Game Adventure
- Bill & Ted's Excellent Game Boy Adventure
- Bill & Ted's Excellent Adventure (Atari Lynx video game)
