= Hilary Davidson =

Hilary Davidson may refer to:

- Hilary Davidson (historian), Australian historian of clothing and textiles
- Hilary Davidson (writer), Canadian-American travel and fiction writer
