= Bill & Ted =

American science fiction comedy franchise

- Title logo taken from Bill & Ted Face the Music
- Created by: Chris Matheson; Ed Solomon
- Original work: Bill & Ted's Excellent Adventure
- Owners: Orion Pictures (Amazon MGM Studios)
- Years: 1989–present

Print publications
- Comics: Bill & Ted's Excellent Comic Book (1991–1992)

Films and television
- Film(s): Bill & Ted's Excellent Adventure (1989); Bill & Ted's Bogus Journey (1991); Bill & Ted Face the Music (2020)
- Television series: Bill & Ted's Excellent Adventures (1990–1991); Bill & Ted's Excellent Adventures (1992)

Games
- Traditional: Bill & Ted's Excellent Adventure (1989); Bill & Ted's Excellent Adventure (1991); Bill & Ted's Excellent Video Game Adventure (1991); Bill & Ted's Excellent Game Boy Adventure: A Bogus Journey! (1991)

Audio
- Soundtrack(s): Bill & Ted's Bogus Journey: Music from the Motion Picture (1991)

Bill & Ted is an American science fiction comedy franchise created by Chris Matheson and Ed Solomon. It features William "Bill" S. Preston Esq. and Ted "Theodore" Logan, portrayed by Alex Winter and Keanu Reeves, respectively, two metalhead slacker friends who travel through time and beyond while trying to fulfill their destiny to establish a utopian society in the universe with their music. The series spans a film trilogy: Bill & Ted's Excellent Adventure (1989), Bill & Ted's Bogus Journey (1991), and Bill & Ted Face the Music (2020). The series has been mainly produced by Scott Kroopf.

There have been numerous spin-offs, including an animated television series (with Winter and Reeves reprising their roles), a live-action television series in 1992, video games and comic books. Originally released by Orion Pictures and produced by Nelson Entertainment and Interscope Communications, ownership moved to Metro-Goldwyn-Mayer following the purchase of PolyGram Filmed Entertainment's pre-April 1996 library in October 1998, and MGM has been the main licensee and distributor since. The series has grossed $85 million and received generally positive reviews from critics.

== Setting ==
The series follows the pair of William "Bill" S. Preston Esq. (Alex Winter) and Ted "Theodore" Logan (Keanu Reeves), initially two teenagers living in San Dimas, California in 1988. They want to make their rock band "Wyld Stallyns" successful, but their ambitions and lackadaisical attitudes leave them close to flunking out of high school and threatening to split the band up forever. Unbeknownst to them, their music will form the basis of a utopian society in the future. The leaders of this society send Rufus (George Carlin) to help Bill & Ted pass school and assure the future with the aid of a time machine, which appears as a phone booth. Later films focus on attempts by others to break up Bill & Ted so that their music will never lead to a utopian future.

== Films ==
=== Bill & Ted's Excellent Adventure (1989) ===
Excellent Adventure introduces Bill and Ted who are trying to write a history report. Rufus, a guide from the year 2688, arrives to provide them the time machine which allows them to travel back in time and meet historical figures in order to learn about key historical events. If Bill and Ted fail to pass, their teacher will have to flunk them and Ted's father will transfer him to an Alaskan military high school, which will lead to Wyld Stallyns never forming, in turn destroying a Utopian future built around their music.

=== Bill & Ted's Bogus Journey (1991) ===
In Bogus Journey, Chuck De Nomolos, a resident of the utopia, is sick of it and sends a pair of Bill & Ted robot doubles back into the past to kill Bill and Ted and make a future based on his ideals. Bill & Ted are killed, face the Grim Reaper, and manage to beat him at several games. This gives them the opportunity to find allies to stop their robot doubles and De Nomolos before an upcoming Battle of the Bands where they must also rescue the princesses to whom they are engaged and start their musical careers.

=== Bill & Ted Face the Music (2020) ===
Bill and Ted are now middle-aged parents, yet to realize the music that the future Utopian society will follow. They are warned by the Great Leader and Rufus's daughter Kelly from the future that they have only a short time in their present to create the great song or reality will collapse. Bill and Ted decide to travel to their future to try to find their song but are hunted by a time-travelling robot. Kelly warns their teenage daughters, Billie and Thea, about their plight, and the two go off into the past to help create a band to make the great song for their fathers in time.

=== Future ===
Shortly before the release of Face the Music, Winter and Reeves discussed the possibility of a fourth Bill & Ted movie, the latter telling Rachel Smith of Entertainment Tonight that it would be "up to the fans". When asked in an interview with DiscussingFilm in August 2020 if the characters of Billie and Thea could result in a sequel or spin-off film, writer Ed Solomon stated, "It wasn't when we were first writing it, but as we saw Brigette and Samara inhabit these roles, I thought for sure if there was interest and people wanted to carry this forward, the Bill & Ted spirit, I would absolutely let those characters carry it forward. I think we've finished with the Alex and Keanu Bill & Ted story. I think it's done, but if people were interested in a Billie & Thea continuation, I think it'd be cool."

== Television ==
=== Bill & Ted's Excellent Adventures (1990–1991) ===
The first season was produced by Hanna-Barbera and ran for 13 episodes on CBS in 1990, featured the voices of Carlin, Winter and Reeves returning to their roles in the film. A second season of eight episodes ran on Fox Kids and was produced by DIC Entertainment, with none of the original cast.

=== Bill & Ted's Excellent Adventures (1992) ===
A later live-action series, featuring none of the cast from the films, included Christopher Kennedy as Bill and Evan Richards as Ted (who also voiced the same roles in the animated season produced by DIC). This version aired seven episodes in 1992 on Fox. William Sadler additionally reprised his role as the Grim Reaper in "The Assassin", a 1994 episode of Tales from the Crypt.

== Cast and crew ==
=== Cast ===
- An ^{A} indicates an appearance through previously recorded material.
- A ^{U} indicates the actor or actress was uncredited for their role.
- A ^{V} indicates a performance through voice-work.
- A ^{Y} indicates an actor portrayed a younger version of their character.

Character	Films			Animated series		Television series
Character	Bill & Ted's Excellent Adventure	Bill & Ted's Bogus Journey	Bill & Ted Face the Music	Bill & Ted's Excellent Adventures		Bill & Ted's Excellent Adventures
Character	Bill & Ted's Excellent Adventure	Bill & Ted's Bogus Journey	Bill & Ted Face the Music	Season 1	Season 2	Bill & Ted's Excellent Adventures
Bill S Preston, Esquire	Alex Winter	Alex Winter	Alex Winter	Alex Winter^{V}	Evan Richards^{V}	Evan Richards
Bill S Preston, Esquire	Alex Winter	William Throne^{Y}	Alex Winter	Alex Winter^{V}	Evan Richards^{V}	Evan Richards
Ted "Theodore" Logan	Keanu Reeves	Keanu Reeves	Keanu Reeves	Keanu Reeves^{V}	Christopher Kennedy^{V}	Christopher Kennedy
Ted "Theodore" Logan	Keanu Reeves	Brendan Ryan^{Y}	Keanu Reeves	Keanu Reeves^{V}	Christopher Kennedy^{V}	Christopher Kennedy
Rufus	George Carlin	George Carlin (Note: Additionally, Pam Grier portrays Mrs. Wardroe, a talent show agent who is revealed to be a disguise worn by Rufus.)	George Carlin^{A}	George Carlin^{V}	Rick Overton^{V}	Rick Overton
Rufus	George Carlin	George Carlin	Piotr Michael^{V}	George Carlin^{V}	Rick Overton^{V}	Rick Overton
Captain Logan	Hal Landon Jr.	Hal Landon Jr.	Hal Landon Jr.	Peter Renaday^{V}	Unspecified voice actor	Matt Landers
Missy	Amy Stoch	Amy Stoch	Amy Stoch	Kimmy Robertson^{V}	Unspecified voice actor	Lisa Wilcox
Princess Joanna Preston	Kimberley Kates	Sarah Trigger	Jayma Mays	Kath Soucie^{V}		
Princess Elizabeth Logan	Diane Franklin	Annette Azcuy	Erinn Hayes	Kath Soucie^{V}		
Mr. Preston	J. Patrick McNamara	J. Patrick McNamara		Unspecified voice actor	Don Lake^{V}	Don Lake
Deacon Logan	Frazier Bain		Beck Bennett	Danny Cooksey^{V}	Unspecified voice actor	
Mr. Ryan	Bernie Casey			Bernie Casey^{V}		
Napoleon Bonaparte	Terry Camilleri					
Billy the Kid	Dan Shor					
Socrates	Tony Steedman					
Abraham Lincoln	Robert V. Barron					
Sigmund Freud	Rod Loomis					
Genghis Khan	Al Leong					
Joan of Arc	Jane Wiedlin					
Ludwig van Beethoven	Clifford David					
Death The Grim Reaper		William Sadler	William Sadler			
Evil Robot Bill		Alex Winter				
Evil Robot Ted		Keanu Reeves				
Station		Ed Gale & Gil Arturo	Ed Gale & Gil Arturo^{A}			
Station		Tom Allard (Note: Allard portrays Station when the character is big-sized.)	Ed Gale & Gil Arturo^{A}			
Station		Frank Welker^{V}	Ed Gale & Gil Arturo^{A}			
Station		Tony Cox^{U} (Note: Tony Cox served as an uncredited stunt double for Station.)	Ed Gale & Gil Arturo^{A}			
Chuck De Nomolos		Joss Ackland				
Colonel Oats		Chelcie Ross				
Thomas Edison		Hal Landon Sr.		Unspecified voice actor		
Albert Einstein		John Ehrin				Arte Johnson
Theodora "Thea" Preston		Candace Mead^{U}	Samara Weaving			
Wilhelmina "Billie" Logan		Lauren Mead^{U}	Jack Haven			
The Great Leader			Holland Taylor			
Kelly			Kristen Schaal			
Dennis Caleb McCoy			Anthony Carrigan			
Kid Cudi			Himself			
Wolfgang Amadeus Mozart			Daniel Dorr	Kath Soucie^{V}		
Babe Ruth			Reece Loustalot	Unspecified voice actor		
George Washington			William Harris	Unspecified voice actor		
Jimi Hendrix			DazMann Still			
Louis Armstrong			Jeremiah Craft			
Ling Lun			Sharon Gee			
Grom			Patty Anne Miller			

Note: A gray cell indicates character did not appear in that medium.

=== Crew ===
Occupation	Films		
Occupation	Bill & Ted's Excellent Adventure	Bill & Ted's Bogus Journey	Bill & Ted Face the Music
Director(s)	Stephen Herek	Pete Hewitt	Dean Parisot
Writers	Chris Matheson & Ed Solomon	Chris Matheson & Ed Solomon	Chris Matheson & Ed Solomon
Producer(s)	Scott Kroopf, Michael S. Murphey, and Joel Soisson	Scott Kroopf	Scott Kroopf, Alex Lebovici, David Haring, Steve Ponce, Ed Solomon, and Alex Winter
Composer(s)	David Newman	David Newman	Mark Isham
Editor(s)	Larry Bock; Patrick Rand	David Finfer	Don Zimmerman
Cinematographer(s)	Tim Suhrstedt	Oliver Wood	Shelly Johnson

== Reception ==
=== Box office performance ===
Film	Release date	Box office gross			Budget	Ref.
Film	Release date	North America	Other territories	Worldwide	Budget	Ref.
Bill & Ted's Excellent Adventure	February 17, 1989	$40,485,039	$23,955	$40,508,994	$10 million	
Bill & Ted's Bogus Journey	July 19, 1991	$38,037,513	$2,337	$38,039,850	$20 million	
Bill & Ted Face the Music	August 28, 2020	$3,439,660	$2,834,367	$6,274,027	$25 million	
Total		$81,962,212	$2,860,659	$84,822,871	$55 million	

=== Critical and public response ===
Critical and public response of Bill & Ted films
Film	Critical		Public
Film	Rotten Tomatoes	Metacritic	CinemaScore
Bill & Ted's Excellent Adventure	83% (58 reviews)	50 (16 reviews)	—N/a
Bill & Ted's Bogus Journey	56% (54 reviews)	61 (10 reviews)	B+
Bill & Ted Face the Music	83% (265 reviews)	65 (41 reviews)	—N/a

== Other media ==
=== Comics ===
DC Comics produced a tie-in comic following the plot of the first movie timed to coincide with that film's release on home video. The sequel was adapted by DC's competitor Marvel Comics, published to coincide with the second film's release in theaters. Its popularity led to the ongoing Marvel series Bill & Ted's Excellent Comic Book by Evan Dorkin, which lasted for 12 issues.

There was a weekly 2/4 page semi-adaptation of the animated series published for a year by UK's defunct Look-In Magazine from 1991 to 1992.

In 2015, Boom! Comics revived the franchise in comic form with the six issue miniseries, Bill & Ted's Most Triumphant Return, followed by a trade paperback collection of the Marvel Comics releases, Bill & Ted's Excellent Comic Book: Archive (2016). The success of the miniseries led to two additional miniseries: the four issue Bill & Ted Go to Hell (2016) and the five issue Bill & Ted Save the Universe (2017).

As an official prequel to the third movie, Dark Horse Comics released the four issue miniseries Bill & Ted are Doomed (2020).

=== Cereal ===
A cereal based on the animated series adaptation. It was made by the defunct Ralston Purina. It was short-lived, like the cartoon and it included many giveaways and promotions.

=== Musical ===
A musical based on the film was produced in 1998 called Bill and Ted's Excellent Musical Adventure.

A second musical, Bill & Ted's Most Excellent Rock Opera, is being developed by screenwriter Chris Matheson with plans for premiering in 2027.

=== Video games ===
There were also Game Boy, NES and Atari Lynx games released, which were very loosely based on the film's plot. A PC title and nearly identical Amiga and Commodore 64 port were made in 1991 by Off the Wall Productions and IntraCorp, Inc. under contract by Capstone Software and followed the original film very closely.

==== Home computer ====
A single player graphic adventure PC game based on the 1989 film Bill & Ted's Excellent Adventure. It was released by Capstone for MS-DOS, Commodore 64, and Amiga systems in 1989.

==== Atari Lynx ====
A video game for the Atari Lynx handheld based on the Bill & Ted films and the Saturday morning cartoon.

==== NES ====
An action-adventure video game based on Bill & Ted's Excellent Adventure that was released in North America by LJN for the Nintendo Entertainment System.

==== Game Boy ====
An action-puzzle game loosely based on Bill & Ted's Excellent Adventure.

==== Mobile ====
Wyld Stallyns is an action-RPG video game based on the Bill & Ted universe was released by Built Games in 2018 for iOS and Android devices.

=== Halloween Horror Nights ===
Bill & Ted also featured in an annual live-action show at Universal Studios Florida and Universal Studios Hollywood during Halloween Horror Nights. Typically the show parodied the past year's worth of notable pop culture events, featuring locally cast performers as the title characters.

In 2013, the Universal Studios Hollywood Bill and Ted's Excellent Halloween Adventure show was cancelled following allegations by Jamie Lee Curtis Taete from Vice of homophobia and racism in that year's show. The show continued at Universal Studios Florida, until 2017.
