= Jokes My Folks Never Told Me =

- Directed by: Gerry Woolery
- Screenplay by: Steven A. Vail; John G. Thompson
- Produced by: Steven A. Vail; Ted Woolery
- Starring: Dixie Edgar; Daniel Fee; Sandy Johnson; Hal Landon Jr. Lisa Marlowe; Andras Maros; Bob Molinari; Mariwin Roberts; Joe Warfield
- Cinematography: Thomas F. Denove
- Edited by: Jay Wertz
- Music by: Ralph Kessler
- Production company: MarLyn Investments
- Distributed by: New World Pictures
- Release date: February 1978
- Running time: 85 minutes
- Country: United States
- Language: English

Jokes My Folks Never Told Me is a 1978 American anthology sex comedy film directed by Gerry Woolery.

== Synopsis ==
Various sketches dramatize classic ribald stories.

== Cast ==
- Dixie Edgar
- Daniel Fee
- Sandy Johnson
- Hal Landon Jr.
- Lisa Marlowe
- Andras Maros
- Bob Molinari
- Mariwin Roberts
- Joe Warfield

Wally Berns, Raven DeLaCroix, Mark Montgomery, Dave Shelly, and Bunny Summers additionally stars as guests.
