= Bill & Ted's Excellent Adventure (1991 video game) =

- Developers: Al Baker & Associates
- Publisher: Atari Corporation
- Director: Steve Ryno
- Designer: Thomas L. Fessler
- Programmer: Al Baker
- Artist: Rick Incrocci
- Composer: Matt Scott
- Series: Bill & Ted
- Platform: Atari Lynx
- Release: NA: 1991; EU: 1991
- Genre: Action
- Modes: Single-player, multiplayer

Bill & Ted's Excellent Adventure is a video game for the Atari Lynx handheld that is part of the Bill & Ted franchise and is based on the Bill & Ted films and the Saturday morning cartoon. It was released by Atari in 1991.

== Gameplay ==
Gameplay screenshot.

The game is set with an overhead view of all the action. Unlike other Bill & Ted games, players get the choice to play as either Bill or Ted.

The main aim of the game is to collect all the musical notes that are scattered around each particular time. The game starts with the player having access to only one timeframe - old Egypt. Bill and Ted can travel to the next timeframe by collecting 16 musical notes, or a phone book page.

There are different structures in the game that can be entered to collect notes, keys, or other important items that are needed. If the player is touched by an enemy, the character is respawned at the entry point of the last building or back at the phone booth.

One gameplay feature the ability to use different items and instruments to ward off enemies. The player starts with the guitar, and if they collect and switch to a different instrument, the game's music changes to reflect the instrument that is being played.

Another feature of the game is the interplay between eras - for instance, when in old Egypt, the player is warned that one of the items they see (the staff) has a false version and a real version. After the player travels to ancient Egypt and finds the staff, then gives it to its owner in old Egypt, they cannot travel to the next destination until they plant the warning. This avoids a time paradox.

Players can save their progress by a unique 16-character password, which represents every part of the game's state. This system worked very well and saved on the costs of putting non-volatile memory into the Lynx game card. It was also possible to play a cooperative multiplayer game, with one player as Bill and the other as Ted, by use of a ComLynx cable.

== Plot ==
The Princesses, Joanna and Elizabeth, have been kidnapped by Death and the San Dimas duo must travel through time to find and rescue them.

== Reception ==
Reception

Review scores
Publication	Score
AllGame	2/5
GamePro	20 / 25
IGN	8.0 / 10
Aktueller Software Markt	3 / 12
Atari Gaming Headquarters	8 / 10
Consolemania	80 / 100
Hobby Consolas	69 / 100
Joypad	73%
Joystick	70%
Play Time	47%
ST Format	14%
Video Games	35%
VideoGames & Computer Entertainment	7 / 10

Robert A. Jung reviewed the game which was published to IGN, in his final verdict he wrote; "It has a fair amount of action with lots of rock-solid puzzle solving, and the addition of time travel offers even more gaming potential. Though the sound and graphics are not extraordinary, in the end Bill and Ted's Excellent Adventure earns its name." Giving a score of 8 out of 10.

== See also ==
- Bill & Ted's Excellent Video Game Adventure NES game.
- Bill & Ted's Excellent Game Boy Adventure Game Boy game.
- Bill & Ted's Excellent Adventure (PC game)
