= Bill & Ted's Excellent Video Game Adventure =

1991 video game

- Developer: Rocket Science Productions
- Publisher: LJN
- Designers: Col Stone; Ernie Cormier
- Programmers: Stuart Ross; Andrew Frank
- Artist: Frank Lam
- Platform: Nintendo Entertainment System
- Release: NA: August 1991
- Genre: Action-adventure
- Mode: Single-player

Bill & Ted's Excellent Video Game Adventure is an action-adventure video game that is part of the Bill & Ted franchise and is based on the film Bill & Ted's Excellent Adventure. It was released in North America by LJN for the Nintendo Entertainment System in 1991. The plot is an original continuation to the film's events.

== Plot ==
The story begins when Rufus summons Bill S. Preston Esq. and Ted "Theodore" Logan for a mission. The boys arrive at different times; first Ted then Bill. They are informed that time-space rebels have gone back in time, kidnapping various historical figures and leaving them stranded in different time periods. So now they must travel to the time periods, retrieve these figures and return them to their correct time periods. This must be done as soon as possible; for if history isn't made right, the boys will miss the big concert that will launch the music career of Wyld Stallyns. Unfortunately, Rufus can only loan out a pay phone-booth for this trip. Once the mission is explained, Ted leaves and Bill arrives later. Rufus states that since they both came alone, it is best that they work separately. From there Bill is brought up to speed on the situation. Bill is instructed to go back in time and leave items to help Ted along the way in each time period he visits. When Bill has done this he will start his own search. Ted will also do the same for Bill's search after he has found a historical figure.

== Gameplay ==
Ted in Medieval World.

Depending on the level, players take control of either Bill or Ted to search for the stranded historical figures' various worlds throughout history and return them to their rightful times. Players will explore houses, buildings, and castles, plus talk to locals for clues and outfox mad villagers by outrunning them or using items from their inventory that can either distract, satisfy, entrance, or cause the person to disappear. In order to gain the historical figure's trust, the player must locate items called historical bait hidden within each world.

== Music ==
Music within the game levels is unique as each piece is short and non-looping. Arranged versions of popular songs are used for various game levels. Medieval World uses "Scarborough Fair", Modern World uses the song "Won't You Come Home Bill Bailey", and Ancient World uses Deep Purple's "Smoke on the Water".

== Reception ==
Reception

Review scores
Publication	Score
Nintendo Power	3.5/5
Honest Gamers	4/10
Just Games Retro	22/100
Flying Omelette	1/5

Nintendo Power gave the game a 3.6 out of 5 stating the positive side as "Bill & Ted fans won't be disappointed by the video versions of the dudes from San Dimas" but that "It isn't easy finding items, which means you'll spend ages wandering around, and that's frustrating." Game Player's Strategy Guide states "It's a change of pace from the usual role playing adventure, with a refreshing - if somewhat overbearing - humor." GamePro states "What could have been a truly excellent video game adventure wound up as a mildly entertaining video-jaunt." Video Games & Computer Entertainment states "The verbose Bill and Ted themselves would likely describe this adventure of theirs as being 'bogus,' but what we get can be best called average."

The website 1UP.com gives the game an F grade, but features no feedback. Honest Gamers gave the game a 4 out of 10 stating "Though it does a reasonable job of making you feel like you're really exploring different historical periods, Bill & Ted's Excellent Video Game Adventure doesn't really do anything else right." Just Games Retro gave a 22 out of 100 stating "It had all the ingredients, yet fundamentally obvious problems that any gamer will catch in ten minutes make it an unplayable mess." Flying Omelette.com gave a 1 out of 5 saying "Thankfully, the Bill & Ted movie got a proper sequel to cleanse the territory stolen by this forgettable outing, which is more of a "bogus journey" than the real sequel claimed itself to be."

== See also ==
- Bill & Ted's Excellent Game Boy Adventure
- Bill & Ted's Excellent Adventure (Atari Lynx video game)
- Bill & Ted's Excellent Adventure (PC game)
