= Hal Landon Jr. =

American character actor

- Born: May 23, 1941 (age 85); Long Beach, California, U.S.
- Education: University of Arizona
- Occupation: Actor
- Years active: 1977–present

Hal Landon Jr. (born May 23, 1941) is an American actor, best known for playing Ted's father Captain Logan in the Bill & Ted franchise.

== Early life and education ==
Landon was born in Long Beach, California and raised there and in Tucson, Arizona. His father, Harold "Hal" Landon Sr. was also an actor, who appeared alongside his son in Bill and Ted's Bogus Journey as Thomas Edison. He graduated from Catalina High School in 1959. He studied theatre at the University of Arizona, and began his stage acting career with the Actor's Workshop in San Francisco.

== Career ==
Landon is best known for playing Ted's father Captain Logan in the Bill & Ted franchise. He has also appeared in films including David Lynch's Eraserhead, Defending Your Life, Trespass, and The Artist. Landon also voiced Oswald Jacobs and provided his likeness via motion capture in the 2011 video game LA Noire.

The majority of his acting has been on television, appearing in episodes of Highway to Heaven, Lou Grant, T.J. Hooker, Dallas, Cheers, Remington Steele, Matlock, Newhart, Quantum Leap, Star Trek: Deep Space Nine, Frasier, Married... with Children, My Name is Earl, Mad Men, and The Middle.

He was a member of the South Coast Repertory in Orange County, California, most notably playing the role of Ebenezer Scrooge on stage from 1979 to 2019.

== Filmography ==
=== Film ===
Hal Landon Jr. film credits
Year	Title	Role	Notes
1977	Eraserhead	Pencil Machine Operator	
1978	Jokes My Folks Never Told Me	Various Roles	
1979	Scavenger Hunt	Cornfield	
1987	Prison	Wallace	
1989	Bill and Ted's Excellent Adventure	Captain Logan	
1990	Pacific Heights	2nd Deputy Sheriff	
1990	Almost an Angel	Paradise Bar local	
1991	Defending Your Life	Man in Past Lives Pavilion	
1991	Bill and Ted's Bogus Journey	Captain Logan	
1996	The Little Death	Mr. Keats	
1998	Break Up	Nike	
1998	Playing by Heart	Actor 'Commissioner'	
1992	Trespass	Eugene DeLong	
2002	Speakeasy	Mr. Petersen	
2005	Greener Mountains	Len	
2011	The Artist	Napoleon	
2012	California Solo	Farmer	
2013	The Sleepy Man	Admiral	Short film
2015	Smosh: The Movie	Butler	
2016	Pee-Wee's Big Holiday	Farmer Brown	
2020	Bill & Ted Face the Music	Captain Logan	

=== Television ===
Hal Landon Jr. television credits
Year	Title	Role	Notes
1981	Lou Grant	Frank Blankenship	Episode: "Hometown"
1982	Father Murphy	Ira Eaves	Episode: "The Dream Day"
1983	T.J. Hooker	Jason	Episode: "Payday Pirates"
1983	Sunset Limousine	Gardener	TV movie
1984	Oh Madeline	Unnamed Character	Episode: "Ah, Wilderness"
1985	Dallas	Oil Man #2	Episode: "Mothers"
1986	The Twilight Zone	O'Dell	Segment: "The Little People of Killany Woods"
1986	Highway to Heaven	Repairman	Episode: "Close Encounters of the Heavenly Kind"
1986	Cheers	Floyd Panjeric	Episode: "Save the Last Dance for Me"
1986	Newhart	James Reeves	Episode: "Sweet and Sour Charity"
1988	Matlock	George	Episode: "The Fisherman"
1988	Winnie	Man with Car	TV movie
1988	Falcon Crest	Henderson	Episode: "Life with Father" (cut scene, uncredited)
1990	Get a Life	Ben Spangler	2 episodes
1990	Hull High	Bus Driver	Episode #1.5
1991	Down Home	Priest	Episode: "Mail Order Tran"
1991	Quantum Leap	Norm	Episode: "A Single Drop of Rain - September 7, 1953"
1992	Married... with Children	Janitor	Episode: "The Goodbye Girl"
1992, 1994	Love & War	Maitre D'	2 episodes
1994	Muddling Through	Gidney	7 episodes
1995	Ellen	Bus driver	Episode: "These Successful Friends of Mine"
1995	Live Shot	Hobart	Episode: "The Forgotten Episode"
1996	The Siege at Ruby Ridge	George Mill	TV movie
1998	Life of the Party: The Pamela Harriman Story	Episcopal Bishop	TV movie
1999	Star Trek: Deep Space Nine	Neral	Episode: "Inter Arma Enim Silent Leges"
2002	Frasier	Mr. Lasskopf	Episode: "Deathtrap"
2008	My Name is Earl	Mr. Hill	Episode: "Orphan Earl"
2009	Numb3rs	Professor Nelson Horowitz	Episode: "Animal Rites"
2009	Mad Men	Achilles	Episode: "The Color Blue"
2010	CSI: NY	Henry Wainwright	Episode: "Uncertainty Rules"
2011	The Middle	Photographer	Episode: "Mother's Day II"
2011	L.A. Noire	Oswald Jacobs (voice)	Video game
2011	The Closer	Terry Weaver	Episode: "Forgive Us Our Trespasses"
2013	Bad Samaritans	Herbert	Episode: "Pilot"
2016	All the Way	Speaker John McCormack	TV movie
2021	Side Hustle	Prescott / Scott Dilger	Episode: "Extra Crunchy"
