= Benjamin John Parrillo =

American actor

Benjamin Parrillo
- Born: Benjamin John Parrillo; Boston, Massachusetts, U.S.
- Other names: Ben Parillo; Benjamin Parrillo; Ben Parrillo
- Education: Wesleyan University (BA)

Benjamin John Parrillo is an American film and television actor, writer and director.

== Early life and education ==
Parrillo was born in Boston. He is a graduate of Wesleyan University, where he majored in theater arts, American history, and Italian.

== Career ==
As of 2007, Parrillo has written and produced two short films: Jolly Good Fellow in 2006 and A Moron, a Loser, and a Coffee Shop in 2007. He also directed and starred in both movies. Parrillo has written feature film scripts that are represented by Creative Artists Agency. In 2010, he wrote, directed, and starred in an original one-hour television series titled Bed of Nails.

As an actor, Parillo's more significant roles have been in shows such as MyNetworkTV's Wicked Wicked Games. He has also been credited for guest appearances in episodes of Law & Order: Criminal Intent, Heartland, Desperate Housewives, CSI: NY, Bones, 24, NCIS, Judging Amy, Boston Legal, Cold Case, The Shield, The Division, Diagnosis: Murder, Charmed, Six Feet Under, NYPD Blue, The King of Queens, Leap of Faith, House M.D., Close to Home, and other television series. Ben appeared in Kathryn Bigelow's Oscar-nominated film, Zero Dark Thirty.

== Filmography ==
=== Film ===
Year	Title	Role	Notes
1995	Captain Jack	Hoss	
1995	Target for Seduction	Robert	
1996	That Thing You Do!	Marine Sergeant	
1996	Total Force	Computer man	
2000	A Better Way to Die	Cooper	
2002	Dragonfly	Paramedic	
2002	Bug	Officer Hamburg	
2002	Emmett's Mark	Det. Chris Ricks	
2003	Evil Alien Conquerors	Tan Guy	Uncredited
2005	Headhunter	Ben Caruso	
2007	The Memory Thief	Mercedes Driver	
2011	A Novel Romance	Good Looking Guy	
2012	Zero Dark Thirty	Pilot	
2013	The Power of Few	Trent Pickford	
2014	Coyote Requiem	Scott	
2016	The Living	Dr. Grainger	
2018	Higher Power	Detective	

=== Television ===
Year	Title	Role	Notes
2000	Diagnosis: Murder	Mr. Paster	Episode: "The Cradle Will Rock"
2001	100 Deeds for Eddie McDowd	Steve	Episode: "A Star Is Born"
2001	Charmed	Jake	Episode: "Charmed Again: Part 2"
2001	Port Charles	Troy	Episode #1.981
2002	Six Feet Under	Plan Man	Episode: "The Plan"
2002	Leap of Faith	Nick	Episode: "Peeps"
2002	NYPD Blue	Phillip Riley	Episode: "Gypsy Woe's Me"
2002	The King of Queens	Dave	Episode: "Bun Dummy"
2002	For the People	Mr. Cool	Episode: "Lonely Hearts"
2004	The Division	Mr. Lance	Episode: "What's Love Got to Do with It?"
2004	The Shield	Lyle	Episode: "Mum"
2004	Cold Case	Mark Adams	Episode: "Lover's Lane"
2004	House	Dr. Kubisak	Episode: "Maternity"
2004	Boston Legal	Andrew Forbes	Episode: "A Greater Good"
2005	Judging Amy	Coach Hank Vitally	Episode: "You Don't Know Me"
2005	NCIS	Rex Eberlee	Episode: "Twilight"
2006	24	Agent Finn	Episode: "Day 5: 12:00 p.m.-1:00 p.m."
2006	Bones	Special Agent Stone	Episode: "The Woman in the Car"
2006	Close to Home	Casey Ford	Episode: "Silent Auction"
2006–2007	Wicked Wicked Games	Detective Dryden	6 episodes
2007	CSI: NY	Frank Clark	Episode: "The Lying Game"
2007	Desperate Housewives	Roger	Episode: "Gossip"
2007	Heartland	Eric Wills	Episode: "The Places You'll Go"
2009	Law & Order: Criminal Intent	Frank Hatcher	Episode: "In Treatment"
2011	Criminal Minds	Gary Rymer	Episode: "Big Sea"
2012	Vegas	Dealer	Episode: "Masquerade"
2014	Castle	Coast Guard Lt. Mundy	Episode: "Driven"
2017	The New Edition Story	Candy Girl Photographer	Episode: "Part 1"
