= Evil Alien Conquerors =

- Directed by: Chris Matheson
- Written by: Chris Matheson; Ryan Rowe
- Produced by: Debra Greico; Joel Hatch; Erica Huggins
- Starring: Diedrich Bader; Chris Parnell; Michael Weston
- Cinematography: Russ Lyster
- Edited by: Mike Murphy
- Music by: David E. Russo
- Distributed by: First Look International
- Release date: December 3, 2003
- Running time: 98 minutes
- Country: United States
- Language: English
- Budget: $500,000

Evil Alien Conquerors is an American science-fiction comedy film. Released in 2003, the film was directed by Chris Matheson, and follows two aliens who are sent to Earth to destroy mankind. When they arrive, they are unable to complete their mission. The two aliens befriend a fast food employee who helps them.

== Plot ==
Two Evil Alien Conquerors are sent to Earth with the order to behead all humans within 48 hours. If they fail, they will be destroyed by Croker, a one-hundred-foot-tall (30 m) giant.

Kenny (Michael Weston) witnesses the Evil Alien Conquerors, My-ik (Diedrich Bader) and Du-ug (Chris Parnell), as they arrive on Earth, literally falling out of the sky with their beheading swords. He offers them shelter at his home, which he shares with Ron, an unpleasant, oversexed infomercial producer.

The conquering duo have a chance to experience Earth culture, where they become friends with Kenny, develop a fondness for Smirnoff Ice and unexpectedly fall in love with two local women, who have a secret of their own. They begin to doubt what they were sent to do, but know they still must attempt to complete their impossible mission despite their lack of skill, any plan or experience.

The giant Croker then arrives to destroy the two inept conquerors and the rest of the Earth's population, but he shrinks down to normal size during transportation. Delusional enough to still believe he is a giant, he attempts to wreak havoc on the town without success.

== Reception ==
Richard Propes of The Independent Critic called the film "awful" and "one of the worst films ever made" specifically criticizing the film's soundtrack, costume, set design, and acting.

== Cast ==
Actor	Role
Diedrich Bader	My-ik
Chris Parnell	Du-ug
Michael Weston	Kenny
Elden Henson	Ron
Phil LaMarr	Vel-Dan
Tyler Labine	Croker
Beth Grant	Sheila
Mike McShane	Rabirr
Martin Spanjers	Jimmy
Joel McCrary	Mr. Breen
NiCole Robinson	Gail
Missy Yager	Penny
Tori Spelling	Jan (uncredited)
Benjamin John Parrillo	Tan Guy (uncredited)
