= Imagine That (film) =

2009 film by Karey Kirkpatrick

- Theatrical release poster
- Directed by: Karey Kirkpatrick
- Written by: Ed Solomon; Chris Matheson
- Produced by: Lorenzo di Bonaventura; Ed Solomon
- Starring: Eddie Murphy; Thomas Haden Church; Nicole Ari Parker; Ronny Cox; Martin Sheen
- Cinematography: John Lindley
- Edited by: David Moritz
- Music by: Mark Mancina
- Production companies: Nickelodeon Movies; Di Bonaventura Pictures; Goldcrest Pictures
- Distributed by: Paramount Pictures
- Release date: June 12, 2009 (United States)
- Running time: 107 minutes
- Country: United States
- Language: English
- Budget: $55 million
- Box office: $23 million

Imagine That is a 2009 American fantasy comedy film starring Eddie Murphy, directed by Karey Kirkpatrick, and written by Ed Solomon and Chris Matheson. It centers on the relationship between a workaholic father (Murphy) and his daughter, Olivia (Yara Shahidi), whose imaginary world becomes the secret to her father's success.

The film had its premiere at the Paramount Theater on the Paramount Studios Lot in Los Angeles, California, and was then widely released on June 12, 2009, by Paramount Pictures. The film received mixed reviews from critics and was a box-office failure, grossing $23 million against a budget of $55 million. Murphy was nominated for a Golden Raspberry Award for Worst Actor for his work in the film.

== Plot ==
Evan Danielson is a successful financial advisor, who had been working at the same securities firm for eight years as their top account manager, until Johnny Whitefeather was hired as his rival. Whitefeather seems to have the whole company under a spell as he spiels his nonsensical idioms filled with Native American mumbo jumbo. The top executives seem more content with chanting Indian-style noises than listening to how they can make money through sound investments.

When Evan discovers that his daughter, Olivia is able to tell the future within the financial world by using her "goo-gaa" comfort blanket and her imaginary friends (Queen Qwali and Princesses Kupida, Sopida and Mopida), he gains an invaluable upper hand at the office. During work, Olivia draws all over Evan's worksheets for a meeting. Outraged, Evan goes to the meeting and he shows off the paperwork and explains the drawings of Olivia using nonsensical terms and using crude humour in anger, confusing his colleagues. Evan thinks he is about to be fired, but his boss informs him that all his predictions came through, because the made up names that Evan created during the meeting were actually the names of real companies

After only a few days with Olivia, Evan rediscovers his inner child, and has fun playing imaginary games with her. Whitefeather becomes suspicious and begins to search for his secret. When he learns that Evan was just playing with a wakalyapi blanket, Whitefeather pays six thousand dollars for one, ordering his son to tell him the future and keeping him up all night by making him drink cans of Red Bull.

Whitefeather and Evan are now competing for the position of head of the Western division of the company D.D.E. In order to be prepared for the presentation, Evan again needs to invoke the use of the Goo-Gaa blanket and meet with the princesses. However, Olivia is spending the night at her friend's house, and there is no way for Evan to obtain the Goo-Gaa without taking it from her. Also, the presentations will be held at the time of Olivia's class concert.

Evan gets Olivia to give him the Goo-Gaa, but she cries because he seems to care only about the blanket, not her. He returns home, tries to get the princesses' attention, then starts working on his presentation. As hours pass, Evan stretches, and the Goo-Gaa falls on the floor, but he continues working without noticing.

Evan goes to the presentation instead of Olivia's class concert. Johnny gives his presentation, but his idea is too crazy for Dante D'Enzo, the owner of the company. When Evan is about to present, he suddenly decides to go to Olivia's class concert, and leaves the presentation. As he drives over, Evan changes into a king costume. At the concert, Olivia is unable to sing her solo part. Evan appears dressed as a king, and she starts singing, delighted to see him.

After the class concert, Evan tells Olivia how sorry he is for misusing her blanket, seemingly not caring about her, and for using the princesses for the wrong reason. Evan and Olivia say good-bye to the princesses, as she says it is time to let them go. They both start waving and, although there is no wind, some leaves fly off into the sky.

D'Enzo offers the position to Evan because his resolve in leaving the presentation demonstrated to D'Enzo that he is not just a sycophant, and his presentation notes showed impressive ideas. Evan accepts.

Evan, Olivia's mother Trish, and Olivia leave happy.

== Cast ==
- Eddie Murphy as Evan Danielson
- Thomas Haden Church as Johnny Whitefeather
- Yara Shahidi as Olivia Danielson, Evan & Trish's daughter
- Nicole Ari Parker as Trish Danielson, Evan's wife
- Ronny Cox as Tom Stevens
- Martin Sheen as Dante D'Enzo
- DeRay Davis as John Strother
- Vanessa Williams as Lori Strother
- Stephen Rannazzisi as Noah Kulick
- Stephen Root as Fred Franklin
- Timm Sharp as Todd
- Marin Hinkle as Ms. Davis
- Lauren Weedman as Rose
- Heidi Marnhout as Cheryl Whitefeather
- Jonathan Mangum as Franklin's Associate
- Mike Vorhaus as Franklin's Associate 1
- Catherine McGoohan as Mrs. Pressman
- James Patrick Stuart as Mr. Pratt
- Anastasia Pineschi as School Choir Member
- Chelsea Barker as School Choir Member
- David Freese as School Choir Member
- Traci Paige Johnson as Blue (voice, uncredited)
- Donovan Patton as Joe (uncredited)

== Production ==
The working title for the film was "Nowhereland". Filming ran from 10 September to 14 December in 2007, at locations including Denver and Los Angeles with Chicken Run screenwriter and Over the Hedge director Karey Kirkpatrick.

== Music ==
The score to Imagine That was composed by Mark Mancina, who recorded his score with an 83-piece ensemble of the Hollywood Studio Symphony at the Sony Scoring Stage.

The film soundtrack features several covers of Beatles songs, such as "Got to Get You into My Life", "Nowhere Man", and two different versions of "Here Comes the Sun", while the song "All You Need Is Love" plays a part in the film's plot.

== Reception ==
=== Box office ===
On its opening weekend, the film ran sixth, grossing $5.5 million in 3,008 theaters with a $1,830 average. The film went on to gross $22.3 million worldwide. This opening was similar to Murphy's previous summer movie, Meet Dave, which also had a lackluster opening week. However, Meet Dave received worse reviews than Imagine That. Imagine That was released in the United Kingdom on August 14, 2009, and failed to reach the Top 15.

About the film's modest success, Murphy said: "The movie didn't have a chance at the box office – it's just me and this little girl and a blanket." He said that he considers the movie one of the worst he has made, and said: "If I really want to cry, I'll put on 'Imagine That'."

=== Critical response ===
On Rotten Tomatoes, the film has an approval rating of 42% based on 118 reviews, with an average rating of 4.8/10. The site's critical consensus reads, "Despite a promising turn by newcomer Yara Shahidi, Imagine That is another pedestrian family comedy that squanders Eddie Murphy's comedic talents." On Metacritic, the film has a weighted average score of 54 out of 100, based on reviews from 23 critics, indicating "mixed or average" reviews. Audiences surveyed by CinemaScore gave the film a grade "A−" on scale of A to F.

Joe Leydon of Variety called it "An undemandingly pleasant, mildly amusing fantasy." Kirk Honeycutt of The Hollywood Reporter wrote: "The result is a much more playable film than recent efforts, though Murphy will have to share the applause with young Yara Shahidi." Time Out's Trevor Johnston called the film "dreadfully flat" and gave it one out of five stars, chastising it for a lack of funny moments. Brandy McDonnell of The Oklahoman praised the filmmakers' restraint in not visualizing Olivia's fantasy worlds, instead inviting the viewer to share in Evan's efforts to navigate his daughter's imagination. While she found the film becomes overly predictable in its later stretches, she concluded that the overall strong storyline, Murphy's unusually disciplined performance, and the strong acting by Shahidi and Church make it an engaging watch. Roger Ebert of the Chicago Sun-Times called it "Amusing without ever being break-out funny."

=== Accolades ===
Award	Category	Nominee	Result
30th Golden Raspberry Awards	Worst Actor	Eddie Murphy	Nominated
30th Golden Raspberry Awards	Worst Actor of the Decade	Eddie Murphy	Won
2010 Young Artist Award	Best Performance in a Feature Film – Leading Young Actress	Yara Shahidi	Nominated

== Home media ==
Imagine That was released on DVD and Blu-ray on October 13, 2009.
