= Emmett's Mark =

- Directed by: Keith Snyder
- Written by: Keith Snyder
- Produced by: Bradley Fuller; Graham Taylor
- Starring: Scott Wolf; Khandi Alexander; Talia Balsam; Sarah Clarke; John Doman; Tim Roth; Gabriel Byrne
- Cinematography: Lawrence Sher
- Edited by: Caroline Ross
- Music by: Steve Porcaro
- Release date: April 13, 2002
- Country: United States

Emmett's Mark is a 2002 American thriller film directed by Keith Snyder, and starring Scott Wolf, Khandi Alexander, Talia Balsam, Sarah Clarke, John Doman, with Tim Roth and Gabriel Byrne. The film also features Ira Hawkins, Benjamin John Parrillo, Elizabeth Reaser, Carolyn McCormick, Adam LeFevre, and Greg Wood, along with Roundhouse Ron as the Crime Scene Unit movie consultant for the Philadelphia Police Department.

The film was also released under the title Killing Emmett Young. Scenes from the movie were filmed at North Penn High School in Lansdale, Pennsylvania.

== Plot ==
Emmett Young is a Philadelphia police detective who has recently been promoted to the homicide division. While investigating the murders of several young women, he is diagnosed with a terminal illness that his doctor says will cause an increasingly painful death.

Unwilling to endure the progression of the disease, Emmett approaches the enigmatic Jack Marlow and asks him to arrange his death. Marlow hires John Harrett, a former police officer working as a security guard, to kill Emmett at an unspecified time after a short delay.

Emmett continues investigating the murders and constructs a profile of the killer. As he makes progress on the case, he begins to reconsider his decision and discovers that his medical diagnosis was incorrect. Realizing that he is no longer dying, Emmett attempts to contact Marlow and cancel the arrangement before Harrett carries out the contract.

== Cast ==
- Scott Wolf as Emmett Young
- Khandi Alexander as Det. Middlestat
- Talia Balsam as Suzanne
- Sarah Clarke as Sarah
- John Doman as Capt. Berman
- Tim Roth as John Harrett/Frank Dwyer
- Gabriel Byrne as Jack Marlow/Stephen Bracken
- Ira Hawkins as Det. Birch
- Benjamin John Parrillo as Det. Chris Ricks
- Elizabeth Reaser as Alison Holmes
- Carolyn McCormick as Mrs. Carlin
- Adam LeFevre as Officer Jim Fields
- Greg Wood as Dr. Dan Kilbannon
- Danielle Mason as Laurie Meyers
- Katrina Law as Francine

== Production ==
Emmett's Mark was Keith Snyder's feature directorial debut. Snyder also wrote the screenplay and served as an executive producer. Graham Taylor, Brad Fuller and Franny Baldwin Benullo produced the film as a Taylor/Fuller production in association with Genuine Article Pictures.

Lawrence Sher served as director of photography, Caroline Ross edited the film, and Steve Porcaro composed its score. Roshelle Berliner was the production designer, Christopher Freeman served as art director, and Ellen Falguiere designed the costumes.

== Reception ==
Scott Foundas of Variety described Emmett's Mark as a visually stylish but unoriginal neo-noir thriller. He considered the film competently made but criticized its characterization and predictable narrative developments. Foundas identified Tim Roth's performance as the film's principal strength, writing that the actor brought energy and personality to the film whenever he appeared on screen.

Jim McLennan of Film Blitz criticized the screenplay as contrived and insufficiently focused, particularly in its handling of the murder investigation. He nevertheless praised the performances of Gabriel Byrne and Roth.
