= Bill & Ted Face the Music =

2020 science fiction comedy film

- Theatrical release poster
- Directed by: Dean Parisot
- Screenplay by: Chris Matheson; Ed Solomon
- Based on: Characters by: Chris Matheson; Ed Solomon
- Produced by: Scott Kroopf; Alex Lebovici; David Haring; Steve Ponce; Ed Solomon; Alex Winter
- Starring: Keanu Reeves; Alex Winter; Kristen Schaal; Samara Weaving; Jack Haven (Note: Credited as Brigette Lundy-Paine); Anthony Carrigan; Erinn Hayes; Jayma Mays; Holland Taylor; Kid Cudi; William Sadler; Jillian Bell
- Cinematography: Shelly Johnson
- Edited by: Don Zimmerman
- Music by: Mark Isham
- Production companies: Endeavor Content; Hammerstone Studios
- Distributed by: Orion Pictures (through United Artists Releasing)
- Release date: August 28, 2020
- Running time: 91 minutes
- Country: United States
- Language: English
- Budget: $25 million
- Box office: $6.3 million

Bill & Ted Face the Music is a 2020 American science fiction comedy film directed by Dean Parisot and written by Chris Matheson and Ed Solomon. It is the third film in the Bill & Ted film series, and the sequel to Bill & Ted's Bogus Journey (1991). Alex Winter, Keanu Reeves, and William Sadler reprise their roles as Bill, Ted, and the Grim Reaper, respectively; while Kristen Schaal, Samara Weaving, Jack Haven, Anthony Carrigan, Erinn Hayes, Jayma Mays, Holland Taylor, Kid Cudi, Jillian Bell and Beck Bennett join the cast. In the film, Bill and Ted must write a song to unite humanity before space-time is destroyed. The script was laid out as early as 2010, but a production deal was not confirmed until 2018. Filming commenced on July 1, 2019.

Bill & Ted Face the Music was simultaneously released in theaters and through premium VOD in the United States on August 28, 2020, by Orion Pictures (through United Artists Releasing). It received generally positive reviews from critics for the performances and story, with many calling it a welcome return to form for the series but the film was a significant box office failure that grossed just $6.3 million against a $25 million budget which can largely be attributed to heavy restrictions on movie theatres due to the COVID-19 pandemic.

== Plot ==
In 2020, Bill and Ted have failed to write a prophesied song to unite the world. (Note: As depicted in Bill and Ted's Bogus Journey (1991).) Their marriages and careers are deteriorating, and time and space are beginning to collapse.

Kelly, the daughter of Bill and Ted's deceased time-travelling guide Rufus, arrives to take them to the year 2720 in San Dimas, California. Her mother the Great Leader tells them that they have until 7:17 p.m. that night to create the song or reality will collapse. They use Rufus's time-traveling phone booth to retrieve the song from their future selves only to discover their future selves have failed; their wives have left them and they blame their past selves for their failures.

An impatient Great Leader sends a time-traveling robot named Dennis to kill them, hoping that it will stabilize reality. Kelly travels back to the present to warn them, but instead meets their daughters Billie and Thea who decide to help make the song. Using Kelly's time machine, Thea and Billie recruit musicians Jimi Hendrix, Louis Armstrong, Wolfgang Amadeus Mozart, Ling Lun, and a prehistoric drummer named Grom. Thea, Billie, and their band return to the present to meet up with Kelly and a time-displaced Kid Cudi, but Dennis inadvertently kills them and sends them to Hell.

Bill and Ted travel to 2067 and find their elderly future selves on their deathbeds. The elderly Bill and Ted give their younger selves a USB drive containing the fabled song by "Preston / Logan", stating that it must be performed at 7:17 p.m at "MP 46". Dennis appears. Upon learning Bill and Ted have the song, Dennis informs them of his blunder. Bill destroys the USB to goad Dennis into killing them so they can rescue their daughters in Hell. This backfires as a distraught Dennis turns his weapon on himself, but Bill and Ted throw themselves in the way of the resulting explosion. All three are sent to Hell, where Bill and Ted locate their daughters and the band. With the help of their daughters, Bill and Ted reconcile with their old bandmate Death to return everyone alive to 2020.

The group arrive on Interstate 210 at the MP 46 marker, just as reality is collapsing. Bill and Ted realize that the song is only to be performed by them, not written by them, and that "Preston / Logan" on the USB drive actually refers to Thea and Billie. For the song to repair the universe, it must be performed by every person in history, all across time. They are joined by their wives, who have realized they are happy with their lives. The four use the booth to create infinite copies of themselves in time and space, handing instruments to everyone who ever lived. Everyone performs the song, with Thea and Billie producing, while Bill and Ted lead the band on guitar. The performance repairs the universe and everyone returns to their respective times.

In the post-credits scene, the elderly Bill and Ted awake from their beds in a nursing home for a spontaneous guitar jam session, proclaiming "We still got it" before calling for the nurse.

== Cast ==
- Alex Winter as Bill S. Preston, Esq., a member of the band Wyld Stallyns and the friend of Ted
- Keanu Reeves as Ted "Theodore" Logan, a member of the band Wyld Stallyns and the friend of Bill
- Kristen Schaal as Kelly, the daughter of Rufus and the Great Leader and a messenger from the future. The name is based on Kelly Carlin, George Carlin's daughter, in tribute to Carlin.
- Samara Weaving as Theodora "Thea" Preston, Bill and Joanna's daughter.
- Jack Haven as Wilhelmina "Billie" Logan, Ted and Elizabeth's daughter.
- Anthony Carrigan as Dennis Caleb McCoy, an emotionally insecure time-traveling robot sent by the Great Leader to kill Bill and Ted.
- Erinn Hayes as Princess Elizabeth Logan, Ted's wife. She was previously portrayed by Diane Franklin and Annette Azcuy in the previous two movies.
- Jayma Mays as Princess Joanna Preston, Bill's wife. She was previously portrayed by Kimberley LaBelle and Sarah Trigger in the previous two movies.
- Amy Stoch as Missy, Bill & Ted's former step-mother, now Ted's sister-in-law.
- Holland Taylor as The Great Leader, the most powerful person in the universe who is the ex-wife of Rufus and the mother of Kelly.
- Kid Cudi as himself.
- William Sadler as Death, a former member of Wyld Stallyns who had a falling out with Bill & Ted due to a lawsuit.
- Jillian Bell as Dr. Taylor Wood, Bill & Ted's couples' therapist.
- Hal Landon Jr. as Chief Logan, Ted's father who is now operating as the chief of police.
- Beck Bennett as Officer Deacon Logan, Ted's younger brother and Missy's husband who is now a police officer. He was previously portrayed by Frazier Bane in the first movie.
- DazMann Still as Jimi Hendrix
- Jeremiah Craft as Louis Armstrong
- Daniel Dorr as Wolfgang Amadeus Mozart
- Sharon Gee as Ling Lun
- Patty Anne Miller as Grom, a prehistoric drummer from 10,000 BC.

George Carlin appears posthumously as a Rufus hologram through the use of repurposed archival footage from the first film, with Piotr Michael providing the character's voice. Kelly Carlin, Carlin's daughter, makes a cameo role as Head Technician, one of Kelly's followers. Dave Grohl has a cameo role as himself. Musician "Weird Al" Yankovic, talk-show personality Guillermo Rodriguez and actor Nathan Head make cameos during the credits.

== Production ==
=== Development ===
Through the production of the first two films in the Bill & Ted series, actors Keanu Reeves and Alex Winter and writers Chris Matheson and Ed Solomon had become close friends, though after the completion of Bill & Ted's Bogus Journey in 1991, there were no immediate plans for a sequel. The four had continued successful careers in the interim.

Around 2005, during a red carpet event, a reporter asked Reeves if he had any interest in playing Ted again, to which he responded positively. This inspired the group to actually think about a third film. Conceptualization for this film began between the four around 2008. In an interview with MTV in September 2010, Winter confirmed that they had come onto an idea for a plot that they felt appropriate with Matheson and Solomon beginning to work on the script with significant input from Reeves and Winter. According to Winter, "We kicked around the idea over the years and had always thought if we could make something that was as kind of genuine in spirit as the originals and without falling prey to kind of retro cynicism or something that was unnecessary, it would be worth doing" and that "we have finally hit upon an idea that we think is pretty great." Even at this early stage, the concept for the third film had involved Bill & Ted having reached middle age and still yet to achieve the prophesied music that brings world peace. First draft of the script had been completed by April 2011. By August 2012, Dean Parisot was attached to direct.

While Reeves and Winter were both eager to return to their roles, there was little interest in the script from any studios. According to Matheson, the original films were considered "cult-y" by the studios, and wanted significant changes to the ideas that they had established, or even a reboot of the series. Studios also expressed concern that since the first film was not distributed internationally, there would not be a large audience for another sequel.

Finding little traction with the studios, the group began trying to appeal to fans around 2014, being more public about the existence of the script and their desire to make it, as a means to show the studios there was a strong audience demand for the film. Reeves and Winter confirmed that the film was still planned in interviews over the following few years. They emphasized that this was more than just a money grab, but an earnest work. Solomon, speaking to Digital Spy in January 2018, said:

We have a script that we really are proud of, that we worked very hard on, that we've done many iterations of—and we did it on spec, meaning we spent years working on it because we wanted to get it right, creatively. This is not, 'Hey let's all cash-in on the Bill & Ted thing for money'—this is the opposite. This is, 'We love these characters, they've been with us for our whole lives'—Chris and me, and Alex and Keanu—and we wanted to visit them again as middle-aged men. We thought it would be really fun, and funny, and sweet.

— Ed Solomon

Due to their messaging, fans began various campaigns to try to influence the studios to pick up the film for production.

The film's outlook changed after the release of John Wick in September 2014 which starred Reeves, according to Matheson. Reeves' career in the prior decade had been lackluster with several flops, but John Wick had renewed his career, and brought newfound attention to any potential projects he was attached to. This included the Bill & Ted script. Two outside media investors, David Haring and Patrick Dugan, came in to provide the financial backing for the film, and by the end of September 2014, more rigorous script reworking had begun while efforts were made to find a studio. Winter said that while John Wick did help with drawing attention to their script, he did not believe that the film was as fundamental to ultimately getting their film made, since they still struggled with longer-term financial deals from that point. Instead, Winter attributed the continued pressure from fans over social media to influence Hollywood that came with news that the film had means of going forward.

Even with initial funding, it still took several years for them to make necessary deals for the actual production. Solomon said many of these deals fell through at the last minute; "We've been to the altar a few times. We get rejected right about the 'now you may kiss the bride' part of it." During this time, they had secured Steven Soderbergh as executive producer, Scott Kroopf, who produced the original film, as producer, and affirmed William Sadler's intention to reprise his role as Death. By this point, the script was mostly finalized and known as Bill & Ted Face the Music. Winter said that of the concept of the script, "The longer it took us to get it made, in a way, the funnier that got."

According to Winter, they eventually had sufficient funds with a studio ready to go, and had added Alex Lebovici as a producer. They approached MGM to secure distribution, prior to its relaunch of Orion Pictures in September 2017. MGM accepted the offer, which Winter said was due to them having a complete package of production ready to go and the backing of fans. In an unusual move, MGM did not finance the film's production, but only took a 15% cut of the film's revenue for distribution and supplied a US$15 million marketing package to be recouped from the revenue. The film was formally greenlit on May 8, 2018, with production handled by Hammerstone Studios. Alongside Soderbergh, Scott Fischer, John Ryan Jr. and John Santilli were named as executive producers, while Steve Ponce joined Kroopf and Lebovici as producers.

On March 20, 2019, Winter and Reeves affirmed that the film's production was ready to start, and that they had secured a release date on August 21, 2020.

Jack Haven (who wore a surf shirt, and who is gender non-binary in real life) and Samara Weaving (who wore overalls) picked their own wardrobes, and were committed to creating a genderless look. The producers decided to not repeat the anti-gay slurs used by the characters in previous Bill & Ted movies—a decision that was praised by both Winter and Reeves.

=== Casting ===
Both Winter and Reeves were confirmed to be in the movie once it was greenlit in May 2018. William Sadler was confirmed to be reprising his role as the Grim Reaper from the second film in March 2019. Jack Haven and Samara Weaving appeared for the roles as Ted's daughter Billie Logan and Bill's daughter Thea Preston, respectively. Keanu Reeves found out that Samara Weaving is the niece of Hugo Weaving, who worked with Reeves in The Matrix film series. Kid Cudi was also announced as a cast member for the film, playing himself as he gets caught up in the events of the film. Anthony Carrigan was cast in June 2019 as Bill & Ted's adversary in the film.

In late June 2019, it was announced that Amy Stoch would be returning as Missy, and Hal Landon Jr. would be returning as Ted's father, Captain Logan. Other casting announcements include recasts of characters from previous films, with Erinn Hayes as Elizabeth, Jayma Mays as Joanna, and Beck Bennett as Deacon, Ted's younger brother. Among casting announcements in July 2019 include Jillian Bell as Dr. Taylor Wood, the family therapist to both Bill and Ted's families, Holland Taylor as the Great Leader in the future San Dimas, and Kristen Schaal as Kelly, a messenger sent from the future for Bill & Ted.

Also in June 2019, Backstage listed a casting call for extras to appear as various historical figures. With help from Jake Tapper, a number of veterans supported by the Wounded Warrior Project were also featured as extras during filming.

Part of the writing and casting for the film was creating a supergroup of musicians across time for the film's conclusion. Solomon, Matheson, and Parisot ran through some of the most influencing musicians and centered on Jimi Hendrix, Louis Armstrong and Wolfgang Amadeus Mozart, played in the film by DazMann Still, Jeremiah Craft, and Daniel Dorr, respectively. In the case of Hendrix and Armstrong, they were able to secure rights to use the artists' likenesses for the film but were forbidden to use them within the film's advertising nor could they use any of their musical works. Christian Scott was brought in to provide instrumental performance for Armstrong, while Ray Suen provided both the piano and guitar performances for Mozart and Hendrix. They included Ling Lun, believed to be the creator of Chinese music, to help diversify the group, and while the legends around Ling Lun identify him as male, the producers opted to cast Sharon Gee as Lun to help round out the cast, given that the Bill & Ted series had never been beholden to historical accuracy. With Death as the group's bassist, they only needed a drummer and created the character of the cavewoman Grom for this, played by Patty Anne Miller, a real-life drummer for artists like Beyoncé and CeeLo Green. Tosin Abasi plays the "air guitar" riffs for Bill & Ted.

There were no plans to recast the role of Rufus, played by George Carlin who died in 2008. Instead, as tribute, Carlin appeared posthumously as a holographic tour guide in the future, using archival footage from the original film, and Kristen Schaal's character is Kelly, Rufus' daughter, who is named after Kelly Carlin, George Carlin's real-life daughter. Kelly Carlin was also given a cameo role in the film as well. There had been plans to have the older Bill & Ted travel back to the Circle K scene from the first film to ask Rufus for advice, for which they would have used a combination of practical set reconstruction and computer-generated imagery to recreate the younger versions of Bill, Ted, and Rufus, but were limited by budget and time to make this work, and scrapped this approach.

=== Filming ===
Initial production and filming started on June 17, 2019, while cast filming commenced on July 1, 2019. The bulk of the filming took place in New Orleans during July 2019. Filming was completed by August 24, 2019. Filming of the scene with Dave Grohl took place in New Haven.

Bonita Unified School District in Los Angeles County, California, which serves the cities of San Dimas and La Verne where the real-life San Dimas High School is located, has opened its doors to allow production to use the school on camera, although most of the actual filming in San Dimas for the first film was in a school in Arizona.

=== Music ===
Rather than focus on the hair metal of the original films, music director Jonathan Leahy involved groups such as Weezer, Mastodon and Lamb of God, who he believed represented the current state of electric guitar. He helped them compose songs for the film, such as Lamb of God's "The Death of Us", used in the future prison scene. As Tosin Abasi was also serving as the "air shredder" for Bill & Ted, Leahy brought in his band, Animals as Leaders, to play on the soundtrack version of the world-saving song.

In addition to selecting the musical acts, Leahy also worked with Gibson to select the various styles of guitars that are used to represent various eras of music in the film.

The soundtrack announced on August 13, 2020, and was slated to be published by 10K Projects to be released alongside the film on August 28, 2020. Weezer released a music video for "Beginning of the End" on August 14, 2020.

During a performance in August 2019, Kid Cudi announced that the soundtrack for the film features a remix of his 2010 song "Erase Me" done by Steve Aoki. However, the track doesn't appear on the soundtrack.

Glass Beach had written the song "Running" for the film, although it was ultimately cut.

=== Post-production ===
Winter stated in a February 2020 interview that they had completed a "fantastic first cut" but were still working on visual effects and music, along with additional filming such as with Kid Cudi a few days prior.

== Marketing ==
First images from the film were published by Entertainment Weekly on December 17, 2019. A teaser poster was released on February 5, 2020. A new poster and a trailer was released on June 9, 2020, unofficially referred to by fans as "Bill & Ted Day" as the date's digits 6 and 9 make up the duo's favorite number 69 from the first film. The second trailer was released alongside the announcement of the planned mixed theatrical/video-on-demand release approach, on July 23, 2020.

== Release ==
Bill & Ted Face the Music was originally scheduled to be released on August 21, 2020, by Orion Pictures through United Artists Releasing in the US and by Warner Bros. Pictures in the UK. Looper observed that the date's digits (8, 21, 20 and 20) coincidentally added up to 69, an in-universe reference to the first film. Due to the postponement of other films caused by the COVID-19 pandemic, Face the Music was moved up a week to August 14, 2020, to fill vacated slots, before then being delayed to August 28, 2020, as to avoid conflicting with the rescheduled release of Tenet. As further complications from the pandemic continued to threaten movie theater openings, United Artists Releasing announced in late July that they would release Face the Music in a combined theatrical and premium VOD premiere on September 1, 2020. Then, on August 6, 2020, Alex Winter announced that the film had been moved back to its August 28 slot.

The film was also distributed in select territories by MGM via third party distributors.

=== Home media ===
The film was released on Blu-ray and DVD on November 10, 2020, by Warner Bros. Home Entertainment. It was released on Ultra HD Blu-ray in the US on August 6, 2024, by Shout! Studios.

== Reception ==
=== Box office and VOD ===
Bill & Ted Face the Music grossed $3.4 million in the United States and Canada, and $2.8 million in other territories, for a worldwide total of $6.3 million which was a significant box office failure against a $25 million budget largely attributed to the films forced limited release due to the COVID-19 pandemic.

The film grossed $400,000 from 1,007 theaters in its first day, and went on to debut to $1.1 million, finishing third at the box office. That same weekend, it was the top-rented film on FandangoNow, Apple TV, the iTunes Store, and Google Play. Fandango also announced that despite being released for only four days, the film was the most popular on the service for the entire month of August. In its second weekend the film made $765,000 from theaters and remained in either first or second place on every VOD platform, including Amazon Prime, Vudu, iTunes, FandangoNow, and Google Play. On September 30, Deadline Hollywood reported that the film had grossed an estimated $32 million from U.S. digital rentals up to that point. In October 2020, The Hollywood Reporter said the film was the fifth-most popular PVOD title amid the COVID-19 pandemic.

=== Critical response ===
On review aggregator Rotten Tomatoes, the film holds an approval rating of 82% based on 266 reviews, with an average rating of 6.8/10. The site's critical consensus reads "As wholesomely goofy as its heroes, Bill and Ted Face the Music is a rare long-belated sequel that largely recaptures the franchise's original charm." On Metacritic, the film has a weighted average score of 65 out of 100 based on 41 critics, indicating "generally favorable" reviews.

Owen Gleiberman of Variety wrote "It zips right along, it makes you smile and chortle, it's a surprisingly sweet-spirited love story... and it's a better tribute to the one-world utopian power of classic rock than Yesterday was. On a scale of one to 10, I wouldn't say that Face the Music goes to 11, but it's a most excellent sequel." Writing for The Hollywood Reporter, John DeFore called the film "an uneven but likable return" and said "Dean Parisot's Bill & Ted Face the Music is almost exactly as good as its two big-screen predecessors—make of that statement what you will—while cleaning up some, but not all, of the things that might make an old fan of those films cringe today."

The film was nominated at the Saturn Awards for Best Fantasy Film Release and Best Make-up in 2021, but lost to Once Upon a Time in Hollywood and Star Wars: The Rise of Skywalker, respectively.

== Future ==
Shortly before the release of Face the Music, Winter and Reeves discussed the possibility of a fourth Bill & Ted film, the latter telling Rachel Smith of Entertainment Tonight that it would be "up to the fans." When asked in an interview with DiscussingFilm in August 2020 if the characters of Thea and Billie could result in a sequel or spin-off film, writer Ed Solomon stated, "It wasn't when we were first writing it, but as we saw Brigette and Samara inhabit these roles, I thought for sure if there was interest and people wanted to carry this forward, the Bill & Ted spirit, I would absolutely let those characters carry it forward. I think we've finished with the Alex and Keanu Bill & Ted story. I think it's done, but if people were interested in a Billie & Thea continuation, I think it'd be cool."
