= Bill & Ted's Excellent Cereal =

Bill & Ted's Excellent Cereal was a cereal based on the Bill & Ted movies and cartoon of the late 1980s and early 1990s. It was promoted with the branding slogan "A Most Awesome Breakfast Adventure". The magazine Mental Floss ranked it first in their list of the 10 best marketing-inspired breakfast cereals.

The cereal was made by Ralston Purina, which at the time sold food products for various animals (both human and non-human). The cereal was cinnamon-flavored and had mini music-themed marshmallows, although they resembled pieces of Kibbles 'n Bits.

While the cereal was sold, which was for only a short period, it offered many giveaways and promotions. One of the more prominent ones was "Hysterical Postcards," which were mini-postcards involving Bill & Ted and their trips through time. Another notable promotion was a free audio-cassette holder, shaped in the image of the Phone Booth, and with a sticker depicting the cartoon versions of Bill and Ted on the front.

The cereal was featured in a comedy bit on The Arsenio Hall Show. When Alex Winter appeared on the show, Arsenio Hall asked Winter about the cereal. Hall then presented Winter with a box of the cereal, and challenged an audience member to eat a bowl, which he did.
