= Bill & Ted's Bogus Journey =

1991 film by Pete Hewitt

- Theatrical release poster
- Directed by: Pete Hewitt
- Screenplay by: Chris Matheson; Ed Solomon
- Based on: Characters by: Chris Matheson; Ed Solomon
- Produced by: Scott Kroopf
- Starring: Keanu Reeves; Alex Winter; William Sadler; Joss Ackland; George Carlin
- Cinematography: Oliver Wood
- Edited by: David Finfer
- Music by: David Newman
- Production companies: Nelson Entertainment; Interscope Communications
- Distributed by: Orion Pictures (United States); Columbia Pictures (International)
- Release date: July 19, 1991
- Running time: 93 minutes
- Country: United States
- Language: English
- Budget: $20 million
- Box office: $38 million (US)

Bill & Ted's Bogus Journey is a 1991 American science fiction comedy film, and the feature directorial debut of Pete Hewitt. It is the second film in the Bill & Ted franchise, and a sequel to Bill & Ted's Excellent Adventure (1989). Keanu Reeves, Alex Winter and George Carlin reprise their roles. The film, which partially spoofs The Seventh Seal, received mixed reviews from critics and grossed slightly less than its predecessor, but has since gained a cult following.

The film's original working title was Bill & Ted Go to Hell, and the film's soundtrack featured the song "Go to Hell" by Megadeth, which Dave Mustaine wrote for the film.

The third movie in the franchise, Bill & Ted Face the Music, was released 29 years later in August 2020, with Reeves, Winter, William Sadler, Amy Stoch and Hal Landon Jr. reprising their roles.

== Plot ==
The music of Wyld Stallyns has created a utopian future society. In the year 2691, former gym teacher turned terrorist Chuck De Nomolos attacks the Bill & Ted University and steals a time-traveling phone booth, intending to alter the history of what he considers to be a foolish and frivolous society by sending evil robot replicas of Bill and Ted back to the late 20th century to prevent the originals from winning the San Dimas Battle of the Bands. Rufus attempts to stop De Nomolos but seemingly becomes lost in the circuits of time.

In the present, Wyld Stallyns are auditioning for an upcoming Battle of the Bands. Though Bill and Ted's current girlfriends and former 15th-century princesses Joanna and Elizabeth have become skilled musicians, the duo themselves are still inept. Despite this, the organizer Ms. Wardroe assures them a slot in the contest as the final act and informs them that victory will result in a record deal and $25,000 prize money. Following a party, the duo proposes to their girlfriends just as the evil robots arrive from the future. After luring the human duo away to Vasquez Rocks and killing them by throwing them over the side of a cliff, the robots begin working to ruin Bill and Ted's eventual fame along with their relationships with their fiancées.

In the afterlife, Bill and Ted's souls are met by Death who says they may challenge him in a game for their souls, but warns that nobody has ever won. Bill and Ted escape after giving Death a "melvin". Attempts to contact the police by possessing Ted's father and a deputy fail and their next attempt for help at a séance held by Missy ends with them being sent to Hell. Tormented by Satan and forced to face their own fears, the duo realize their only escape is to take Death's offer; he then appears and allows them to choose a game. To Death's dismay, they select modern games like Battleship, Clue, Electric Football and Twister, beating him every time. Finally, he reluctantly concedes, placing himself at their command.

Realizing they need to build good robots to counter De Nomolos's evil robots, Death escorts the pair to Heaven. God directs the group to an alien duo named "Station", who readily agree to help them. On the eve of the Battle of the Bands, Bill and Ted are brought back to life. Having obtained supplies from the Builders Emporium store, the two Stations run at each other, merging to form a single giant being who constructs the benevolent robot versions of Bill and Ted in the back of the van as they race back to the concert. Elsewhere, the evil robots abduct the girls and tie them high above the stage at the Battle of the Bands, intending to drop them to their deaths at the finale.

Bill and Ted arrive just as the evil robots take the stage; the benevolent Good Robots easily defeat their evil counterparts and Joanna and Elizabeth are lowered by Station before their ropes break. De Nomolos appears in the time booth, preparing to kill Bill and Ted himself, and overrides the broadcasting equipment to send a live feed of their confrontation across the entire planet. Bill and Ted deduce that they can go back in time following the encounter to arrange events for De Nomolos to be captured in the present; though De Nomolos attempts to follow suit, the duo turn the tables by explaining that only the winners get to go back. After De Nomolos is "melvined" by Death and arrested by Ted's father Captain Logan, Ms. Wardroe reveals herself to be a disguised Rufus, who gives them the stage.

Acknowledging their ineptness, the duo decide to use the time booth; they immediately return to the auditorium with their families, which now include young children, after sixteen months of intense guitar training and a two-week honeymoon. Joined by Death, the Stations, and the good robots on stage, Wyld Stallyns perform a stunning rock ballad as De Nomolos's broadcast continues, broadcasting their music worldwide and creating harmony.

During the credits, newspaper and magazine covers show the victorious Wyld Stallyns encountering many perks of fame that help them to fulfill their destinies and create their utopian society with their music, eventually taking their act to Mars.

== Cast ==
- Alex Winter as Bill S. Preston, Esq / Granny S. Preston, Esq / Evil Bill
  - William Thorne as young Bill
- Keanu Reeves as Ted "Theodore" Logan / Evil Ted
  - Brendan Ryan as young Ted
- William Sadler as Death
  - Sadler also plays an English Father
- Joss Ackland as Chuck De Nomolos
- George Carlin as Rufus
- Chelcie Ross as Col. Oats
- Pam Grier as Ms. Wardroe
- Annette Azcuy as Elizabeth
- Sarah Trigger as Joanna
- Hal Landon Jr. as Captain Logan, Ted's father
- J. Patrick McNamara as Mr. Preston, Bill's father
- Amy Stoch Poynton as Missy, formerly Bill's stepmother; now Ted's
- Ed Gale and Arturo Gil as Station
- Tom Allard as Big Station
- Michael "Shrimp" Chambers as Good Robot Bill
- Bruno "Taco" Falcon as Good Robot Ted
- Taj Mahal as Gatekeeper
- Frank Welker as the voices of Satan, The Easter Bunny and Station
- Tony Cox as Station

Progressive rock/metal band Primus appear as themselves during Battle of the Bands, performing "Tommy the Cat". Musician Jim Martin, at the time the lead guitarist of Faith No More, also appears as himself, introduced by Rufus as "Sir James Martin, head of the Faith No More Spiritual and Theological Center." Candace and Lauren Mead portray "Little Bill" Logan and "Little Ted" Preston; in Bill & Ted Face the Music, the characters are revealed to be girls, whose full names are Billie Logan and Thea Preston.

Sadler had been drawn to the role of Death as at the time, he had been cast as a serious villain in numerous films, but had wanted to return to doing comedy as he had done earlier in the Broadway production of Biloxi Blues. Having enjoyed Bill & Ted's Excellent Adventure, he thought the idea of Death as a villain in a comedic film would be a good role for him, auditioning via tape using an accent from Czechoslovak actor Jan Tříska with whom he had co-performed in an earlier stage production. When he was called in to audition in person, they had asked him to come in aged makeup; Sadler contacted Scott Eddo, the makeup supervisor for Die Hard 2, to make him look authentically old, which Sadler believed helped get him the role, along with the humor he injected into the audition. Sadler said that in the film, nearly everything Death does was written into the script, outside of the same accent that he used from his audition forward.

The name "Station" was the result of a leftover editing typo, according to the movie's writers Chris Matheson and Ed Solomon. They had cut a scene from the script, labeled "INT. POLICE STATION" but had left the "STATION" part dangling, and as they were overtired at the time, found that saying "Station" in a "[tiny] Martian voice" was hilarious, and the name stuck.

== Soundtrack ==
As was particularly common at the time, the soundtrack album focuses on the rock music heard throughout the film. An album of the full orchestral score by David Newman would not become available until 2007.

The song Bill and Ted play for the battle of the bands is "Final Guitar Solo" by Steve Vai, which he wrote to help blend into "God Gave Rock 'N' Roll to You II" by Kiss, although Bill appears similar in appearance to Dusty Hill and Billy Gibbons from ZZ Top. Vai also does all of the guitar riffs when Bill & Ted "air guitar" throughout the film.

There is also a reference to the lyrics from "Every Rose Has Its Thorn" by Poison.

== Home media ==
Bogus Journey was released on VHS in January 1992, then released on DVD, alongside Excellent Adventure, on December 4, 2001. Shout! Factory released the film on Blu-ray for the first time on November 20, 2018.

== Reception ==
On review aggregator Rotten Tomatoes, 56% of 54 critics gave Bogus Journey a positive review, with an average rating of 5.90/10. The website's critics consensus reads "Bill & Ted's Bogus Journey has the same stars—and cheerfully wacky sense of humor—as its predecessor, but they prove a far less effective combination the second time around." Metacritic assigned the film a weighted average score of 61 out of 100, based on 10 critics, indicating "generally favorable" reviews. Audiences polled by CinemaScore gave the film an average grade of "B+" on an A+ to F scale.

Desson Howe of The Washington Post called it "an entertaining, surreal journey" that is "funnier and livelier than the original." Janet Maslin of The New York Times called it "amusing but sloppy and overcomplicated". Roger Ebert gave the film 3 out of a possible 4 stars, writing, "It's the kind of movie where you start out snickering in spite of yourself, and end up actually admiring the originality that went into creating this hallucinatory slapstick." (Ebert did not see or review the first film.) Dave Kehr, then of the Chicago Tribune, also gave the film 3 stars. He stated that it is unusual for an Ingmar Bergman parody to show up in a teen comedy, and referred to the film as a "genuine pleasure." Gene Siskel, also of the Tribune, gave the film only 2½ stars, but did say that the second film was better than the first. Leonard Maltin also gave Bogus Journey 2½ stars, a half-star more than he gave to Excellent Adventure. Variety wrote that the film has "a few triumphant moments, but not enough to sustain [the] pic's running time."

== Marvel Comics adaptation ==
To coincide with the release of Bill & Ted's Bogus Journey, Marvel Comics released a one-shot comic book adaptation of the film, hiring Evan Dorkin to adapt the screenplay and pencil the art. Like Archie Goodwin's adaptation of the first Star Wars film, Dorkin worked from the original script, which included many deleted scenes such as the fears from Hell attempting to block Bill and Ted from the concert, and Evil Bill and Ted killing Bill and Ted before they remind the Reaper that they are owed lives from beating him so many times. Death was portrayed as the archetypal skeletal figure. Due to the popularity of the comic, Marvel commissioned a spin-off series, Bill & Ted's Excellent Comic Book, which kept the talents of Dorkin, DeStefano, and Severin. The series ran for 12 issues, featuring original stories, such as Death taking a vacation, a medieval version of Bill and Ted, Bill and Ted gaining a band manager, a return by De Nomolos, an attempt to stop John Wilkes Booth, and meeting Little Bill and Ted from the future, who in this version were boys.
