= Bill & Ted's Excellent Comic Book =

- Cover to #1

Publication information
- Publisher: Marvel Comics
- Schedule: Monthly
- Format: Ongoing series
- Genre: Science fiction
- Main character(s): Bill & Ted

Creative team
- Written by: Evan Dorkin
- Penciller(s): Evan Dorkin
- Inker(s): Stephen DeStefano, Marie Severin

Bill & Ted's Excellent Comic Book was a twelve-issue comic book series published in 1991–1992 and based on the Bill & Ted franchise. The series was nominated for a 1992 Eisner Award in the category of Best Humor Comic.

== Plot ==
The first two issues revolve around the efforts of Bill S. Preston, Esq. and Ted "Theodore" Logan as they plan a party to celebrate their recent nuptials. Unfortunately the personification of mortality, Death, a more recent ally, becomes vastly out of sorts and steals the phone-booth time machine. Rufus, their old guide, helps by directing them to a prototype for the phone booth/time machine. Bill and Ted must take the device and find Death before he causes too much damage to the time stream. The two also must deal with jealous rivals, who do not accept that Bill and Ted's wives had freely chosen to marry.

== Development ==
It was written and illustrated by Evan Dorkin. The story continued from the end of the second film, Bill & Ted's Bogus Journey, which Dorkin had also adapted for Marvel Comics. As of a 2015 interview, Dorkin still has not seen the original movie.

== Reprints ==
In 2005, Slave Labor Graphics reprinted the series in two trade paperbacks. While the reprints did include the Bill & Ted's Bogus Journey adaptation, the eighth issue of the regular series was skipped due to the fact that Dorkin did not write or illustrate the issue. In 2016, Boom! Studios published Bill & Ted's Excellent Comic Book Archives, reprinting the same material in color, plus letter columns.
