= Hilary Davidson (historian) =

Australian historian

- Occupation: historian
- Known for: expertise in analyzing the historical accuracy of costumes

Hilary Davidson is an Australian historian, who has specialized on the dress and textiles of the Georgian period. In 2019 she published Dress in the Age of Jane Austen.

== Professional career ==
Early in her career Davidson traveled widely, and became an artisanal expert in recreating vintage clothing.

In 2012 Austrian archeologists published a report on their discovery of medieval bras. Davidson's opinion on this discovery was widely quoted. She called the bras an amazing find, said one was very similar to a modern bra, and compared them to a missing link.

In 2018 a team of archeologists found a skeleton that was still wearing thigh high leather boots, in mud in the Thames River. Science Alert quoted Davidson, to provide context of the discovery, for its readers. She clarified that while thigh-high boots are a fashion item today, these boots seem to be designed for a working man, whose job required him to be wading in the shallows of the Thames.

== The Bill & Ted test ==
The Bill and Ted Test
(@BillAndTedTest)
tweeted:

This is @fourredshoes Regency screen costume benchmark: the Beethoven scene from Bill and Ted's Excellent Adventure. If a production's main costumes are less well done than those of the extras in a minor part of a 1980s teen comedy movie, we have a problem.

March 27, 2020

Slate magazine credits Davidson for a Bill & Ted test for period costume accuracy. In an interview with Slate Davidson described spending six years working on Dress in the Age of Jane Austen, which required a great deal of meticulous checking of modern works. She described having the movie Bill & Ted's Excellent Adventure playing in the background, when the heroes capture Beethoven. Davidson described being impressed at the authenticity of the costuming of the scenes set in Beethoven's time. Even the background characters in those scenes were wearing quite authentic costumes. Surprisingly, the costume designers had achieved much more authentic costumes than more serious films with larger budgets.

Slate reported that Davidson created new twitter ID @BillAndTedTest specifically to publish analysis of the costume design of period movies. Slate quoted the tweet where Davidson gave the test its name.

== Personal life ==
Davidson was one of the Australians stranded in Europe by the COVID-19 virus profiled by 7News, on January 8, 2021. She described traveling to the United Kingdom, for just two weeks of consulting, in March 2020, arriving just in time for the travel ban. She thought that her job as a teacher in a government-run institution would have classified her as an "essential worker", however she still had not been able to get a high enough travel priority to return to Australia.

She had been able to teach online, in 2020. But she described her frustration following the sixth cancellation of her travel plans, when Australia tightened travel restrictions from the UK, following the discovery of a mutated virus there.
