= Bill & Ted's Excellent Game Boy Adventure: A Bogus Journey! =

1991 video game

- North American cover art
- Developer(s): Beam Software
- Publisher(s): Acclaim Entertainment (Note: Released under the LJN brand name.)
- Producer(s): Sue Anderson
- Programmer(s): Cameron Sheppard
- Artist(s): Paul Mitchell
- Composer(s): Marshall Parker
- Platform(s): Game Boy
- Release: NA: October 1991; EU: 1992
- Genre(s): Action, puzzle
- Mode(s): Single-player

Bill & Ted's Excellent Game Boy Adventure: A Bogus Journey! or Bill & Ted's Excellent Portable Adventure is an action-puzzle video game based on the Bill & Ted films released by Acclaim Entertainment for the Game Boy in 1991.

== Plot and gameplay ==
Level one.

Chuck De Nomolos has hatched another plan to alter history in his favor. He has stolen special orbs called Time Fragments and scattered them all across time. Now Bill and Ted must travel across time to retrieve the time fragments to prevent the future from altering. But it won't be easy for the San Dimas duo. As De Nomolos has the aid of the evil robot Bill and Ted, plus he has brainwashed Death and some historical figures to stop them along the way.

Each level takes place on a single screen. Players must collect scattered time fragments while jumping platforms, climbing ladders or ropes, and avoiding enemies. Because this is a Game Boy game, all sprites are very simplistic as both Bill and Ted have almost identical game sprites. In addition, enemies are only differentiated by their actions.

== See also ==
- Bill & Ted's Excellent Video Game Adventure
- Bill & Ted's Excellent Adventure (Atari Lynx video game)
- Bill & Ted's Excellent Adventure (PC game)
