= Ed Solomon =

American filmmaker (born 1960)

- Born: Edward James Solomon; September 15, 1960 (age 66); Saratoga, California, U.S.
- Occupations: Screenwriter, director, producer
- Spouse: Cynthia Cleese (m. 1995; div. 2011)
- Children: 2

Edward James Solomon (born September 15, 1960) is an American filmmaker. He is best known for creating the Bill & Ted franchise alongside Chris Matheson. Together, they wrote the screenplays to Bill & Ted's Excellent Adventure (1989), Bill & Ted's Bogus Journey (1991) and Bill & Ted Face the Music (2020). He also wrote the screenplay for Men in Black (1997), and Now You See Me (2013).

== Early life and education ==
Solomon grew up in suburban Boston, until his family moved to California. He went to UCLA and majored in Economics while beginning his career as a joke writer, stand-up comedian, and playwright.

== Career ==
While still in college, he was a staff writer for Laverne & Shirley – making him (at the time) the youngest member of the Writers Guild of America. He then spent three years writing the cult Showtime TV series, It's Garry Shandling's Show, before venturing into feature films in the 1980s. He helped create and co-write the critically acclaimed comedies Bill & Ted's Excellent Adventure and Bill & Ted's Bogus Journey (with Chris Matheson). Solomon also worked on a number of hit franchise films, including Men in Black, Charlie's Angels, and the Now You See Me films.

Solomon worked on an early version of a Universal The Invisible Man remake, with Johnny Depp. In March 2016 he completed production on Mosaic, a 6 six-part television project for HBO in collaboration with director Steven Soderbergh. This production was the first in a series of collaborations with Soderbergh, including the neo-noir film No Sudden Move which was released on July 1, 2021 on HBO Max, and the crime series Full Circle, which premiered on Max on July 13, 2023.

== Personal life ==
He was married from 1995 to 2011 to Cynthia Cleese, daughter of Connie Booth and John Cleese. They have two children.

Solomon is Jewish.

== Filmography ==
=== Film ===
Year	Title	Writer	Producer	Director
1989	Bill & Ted's Excellent Adventure	Yes	No	Stephen Herek
1991	Bill & Ted's Bogus Journey	Yes	Co-producer	Peter Hewitt
1992	Leaving Normal	Yes	Associate	Edward Zwick
1992	Mom and Dad Save the World	Story	No	Greg Beeman
1993	Super Mario Bros.	Yes	No	Rocky Morton; Annabel Jankel
1997	Men in Black	Yes	No	Barry Sonnenfeld
2000	What Planet Are You From?	Yes	No	Mike Nichols
2000	Charlie's Angels	Yes	No	McG
2003	The In-Laws	Yes	No	Andrew Fleming
2003	Levity	Yes	Yes	Himself
2009	Imagine That	Yes	Yes	Karey Kirkpatrick
2013	Now You See Me	Yes	No	Louis Leterrier
2013	Rapture-Palooza	No	Executive	Paul Middleditch
2016	Now You See Me 2	Yes	Executive	Jon M. Chu
2020	Bill & Ted Face the Music	Yes	Yes	Dean Parisot
2021	No Sudden Move	Yes	No	Steven Soderbergh
2025	The Christophers	Yes	No	Steven Soderbergh

Acting credits

Year	Title	Role	Notes
1989	Bill & Ted's Excellent Adventure	Stupid Waiter	
1991	Bill & Ted's Bogus Journey	"Stupid" Seance Member	
1992	Leaving Normal	Jerk in Bar	As Edward Solomon
1992	Mom and Dad Save the World	Destroyer #13	
2010	Barry Munday	Doctor #2	
2020	Bill & Ted Face the Music	Stupid Demon	

Other credits

Year	Title	Role	Notes
1987	Revenge of the Nerds II: Nerds in Paradise	Soundtrack	Lyrics: "No on Fifteen"
2000	The Prime Gig	Special thanks	
2000	X-Men	Uncredited revision	
2005	Paradise Now	Special thanks	
2008	Choke	Special thanks	

=== Television ===
Key
†	Denotes television productions that have not yet been released

Year	Title	Director	Writer	Creator	Producer	Notes
1982–1983	Laverne & Shirley	No	Yes (3)	No	No	
1986–1989	It's Garry Shandling's Show	No	Yes (8)	No	No	Also script consultant
1990	The Dave Thomas Comedy Show	No	Yes	No	No	
1992	Arresting Behavior	Yes (1)	Yes (2)	No	No	
1999	The Unbelievables	Yes	Yes	Yes	Yes	Television pilot
2017–2018	Mosaic	No	Yes (6)	No	No	
2023	Full Circle	No	Yes (6)	Yes	Executive	
2027	The Spot †	TBA	Yes	Yes	Executive	
