= Off the Wall Productions =

American theater production company

Off the Wall Productions is a theater production company located in Carnegie, Pennsylvania, USA. A non-profit 501 C3 and Carnegie Stage’s Resident Professional Theater Company, working under contract with Actors' Equity Association, producing on average four plays during their season. Recent focus has been the production of new plays, written by women playwrights.

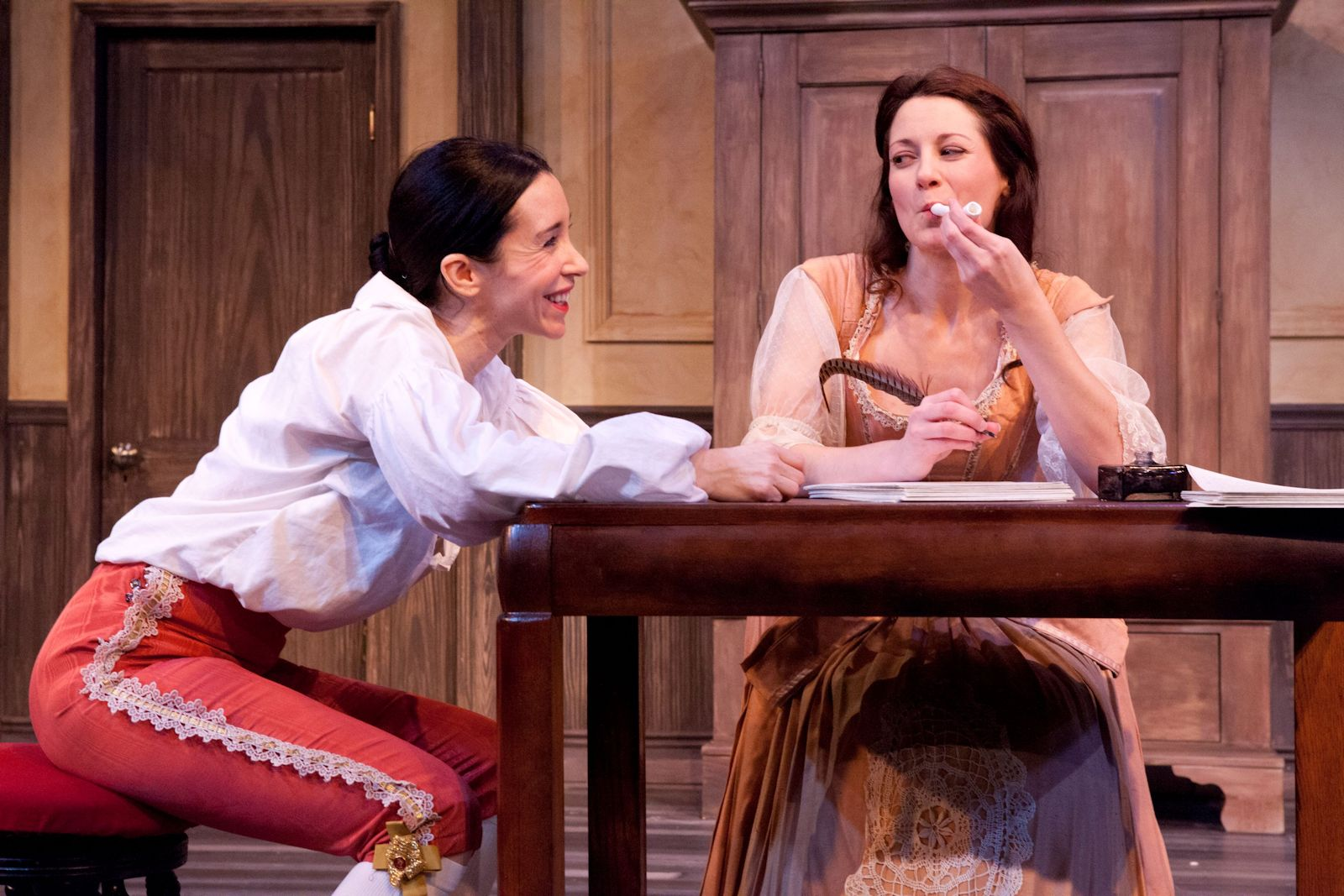
Or - Robin Abramson - Erika Cuenca

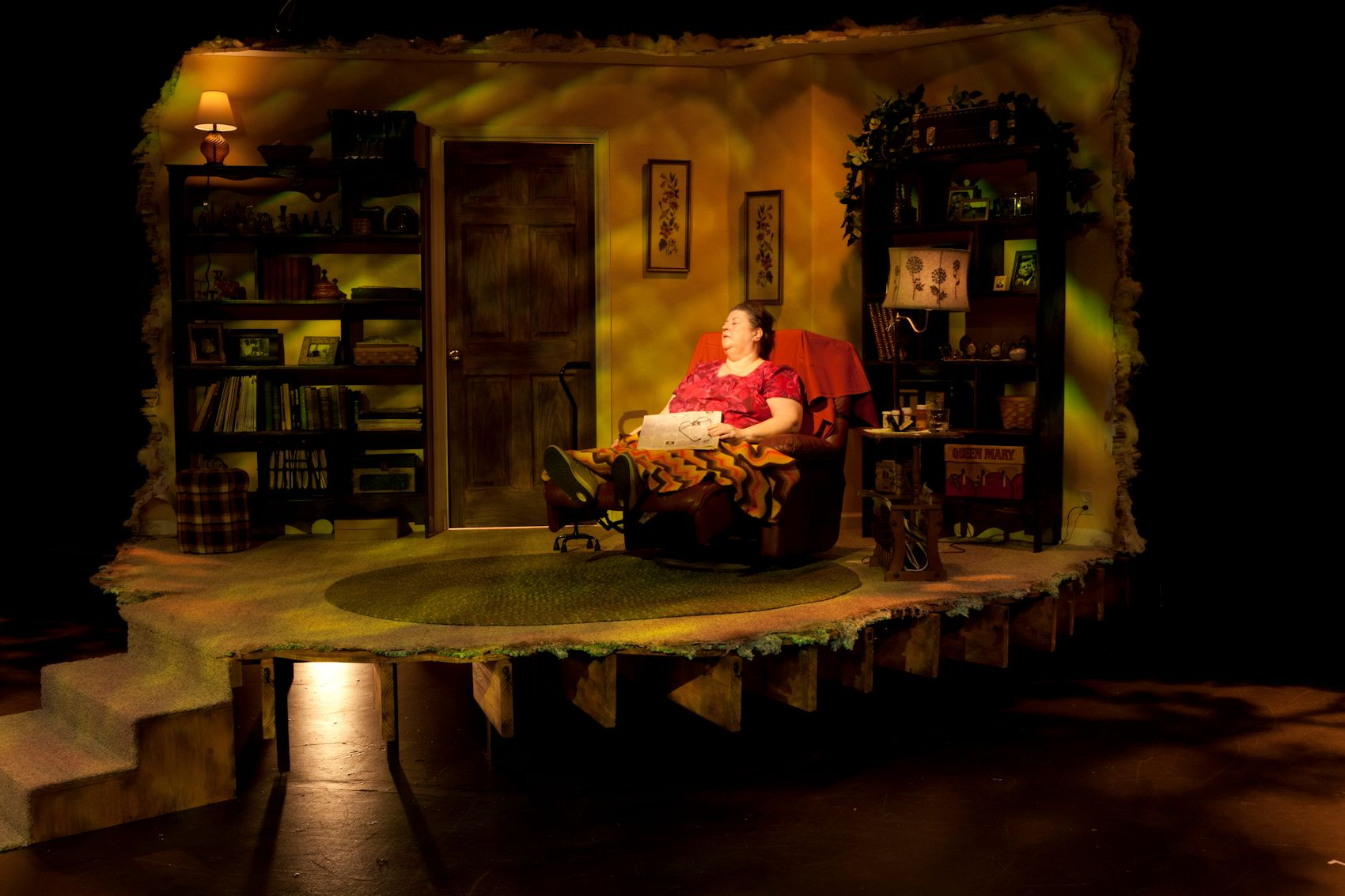
Well - Virginia Wall Gruenert

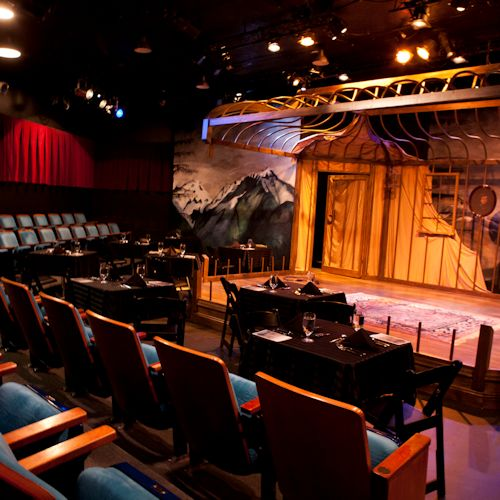
Carnegie Stage theater inside

== History ==
Established in 2007 in Washington under managing director Hans H Gruenert, the theatre started out producing established plays and musicals as well as Virginia Wall Gruenert's original plays Shaken & Stirred, and Without Ruth. Off the Wall's productions have consistently received positive reviews from local critics, having had its actors and designers recognized in the yearly "Best of" articles in Observer-Reporter and Pittsburgh-Outonline as well as having had praise from Pittsburgh City Paper and Pittsburgh Post-Gazette.

In 2012, the theatre company moved to a new location in Carnegie that also serves as a multicultural center for use by other performance groups, including the Pittsburgh New Works Festival.

== See also ==
Theatre in Pittsburgh
