= Chris Matheson (screenwriter) =

American film director and screenwriter (born 1959)

- Born: Christian David Matheson; February 25, 1959 (age 67); Los Angeles, California, U.S.
- Education: University of California, Los Angeles
- Occupations: Film director, screenwriter
- Years active: 1989–present
- Father: Richard Matheson
- Relatives: Richard Christian Matheson (brother); Ali Marie Matheson (sister)

Christian David Matheson (born December 11, 1959) is an American film director and screenwriter. Matheson is best known for his collaborations with fellow screenwriter Ed Solomon, together creating the Bill & Ted franchise, writing the three films Bill & Ted's Excellent Adventure, Bill & Ted's Bogus Journey, and Bill & Ted Face the Music. Together they also wrote the films Mom and Dad Save the World and Imagine That.

His 2015 book The Story of God: A Biblical Comedy about Love (and Hate) is an alternative interpretation of the Christian Bible as seen through the eyes of an atheist.

He is the son of author Richard Matheson, as well as the younger brother of fellow screenwriter Richard Christian Matheson and the brother of producer Ali Marie Matheson.

He is a graduate of University of California, Los Angeles.

== Filmography ==
Year	Program	Director	Writer	Notes
1989	Bill & Ted's Excellent Adventure	No	Yes	
1991	Bill & Ted's Bogus Journey	No	Yes	
1992	Mom and Dad Save the World	No	Yes	
1993	Mike the Detective	Yes	Yes	Short film
1995	A Goofy Movie	No	Yes	
1996	Mr. Wrong	No	Yes	
2000	Stepsister from Planet Weird	No	Yes	TV movie
2001	The Wise Ones	Yes	Yes	
2003	Evil Alien Conquerors	Yes	Yes	
2007	Monkeys	Yes	Yes	
2009	Imagine That	No	Yes	
2013	Rapture-Palooza	No	Yes	Also executive producer
2020	Bill & Ted Face the Music	No	Yes	
