= Caitlin Parrish =

American dramatist

- Born: Atlantic Beach, Florida, U.S.
- Occupation: Playwright, television writer, filmmaker
- Education: DePaul University (BFA); University of Southern California (MFA)

Caitlin Parrish is an American playwright, television writer, and filmmaker and, along with Erica Weiss, the co-creator of The Red Line on CBS. Her work in television also includes Supergirl, Under The Dome, and Emily Owens MD. Plays include A Twist of Water, The Downpour, and The Burials, which were all created with her frequent collaborator, Erica Weiss. The View from Tall was her first feature film, which she also co-directed with Weiss.

== Personal life ==
Parrish was born and raised in Atlantic Beach, Florida and has spent the last decade in Los Angeles. Despite that, she still claims Chicago as her artistic home. She received her B.F.A. in theater studies from The Theatre School at DePaul University and has an M.F.A. in screenwriting from the University of Southern California where she was an Annenberg Fellow. She currently resides in Los Angeles with her husband, son and their dog.

== Theater ==
At age 18, Caitlin Parrish won the 2003 National Young Playwrights Competition, founded by Stephen Sondheim, for her first play, The View from Tall. It subsequently received an off-Broadway run at the historic Cherry Lane Theatre. She would later adapt it into the screenplay for the 2016 film of the same name.

Parrish received her B.F.A. in theater studies from the Theatre School at DePaul University where she met Erica Weiss and began a creative partnership that has lasted over 15 years. Her most recent plays, created with Weiss, include A Twist of Water and The Downpour. A Twist of Water (Route 66 Theatre), also enjoyed an off-Broadway run at 59E59 and was nominated for Best New Work at the Joseph Jefferson Awards. It was the inspiration for The Red Line on CBS. The Downpour (Route 66 Theatre) also received a Best New Work nomination at the Jeffs, and both plays were named finalists by the American Theatre Critics Association for the Steinberg Award for Best New American Play. Parrish and Weiss also collaborated on The Burials, which played at Steppenwolf Theatre in 2016. Parrish was also known in Chicago for her work as a Theater Critic for Time Out Chicago and for her lectures and solo performance pieces.

== Film ==
Parrish and Weiss co-directed their first feature film, The View from Tall, based on Parrish's first play. It stars Amanda Drinkall, Michael Patrick Thornton, and Carolyn Braver. The View From Tall premiered at the Los Angeles Film Festival and went on to play at other festivals including Chicago International Film Festival 2016, Los Angeles Film Festival 2016, Midwest Independent Film Festival 2017, and New York ReelAbilities Film Festival 2017, and is distributed through Cow Lamp Films.

== Television ==
Her work in television includes stints as a writer for Emily Owens, M.D., Under the Dome, and Supergirl. She received a Humanitas Award for her original television pilot “Painkiller.”

Parrish is an Executive Producer and Showrunner of The Red Line on CBS, produced by Warner Brothers. Executive Producers also include Ava DuVernay, Greg Berlanti, Sarah Schechter, Sunil Nayar, and Erica Weiss. It stars Noah Wyle, Emayatzy Corinealdi, Aliyah Royale, Noel Fisher, Michael Patrick Thornton, Vinny Chhibber, Howard Charles, and Elizabeth Laidlaw. The 8 episode event series will be shown over four Sundays starting on April 28, 2019. The Red Line follows the lives of three vastly different Chicago families whose stories of loss intersect in the wake of the mistaken shooting of a black doctor by a white cop.
