= The Spot (TV series) =

Upcoming American drama series

- Genre: Drana
- Created by: Ed Solomon
- Starring: Claire Danes; Ewan McGregor; Macon Blair; Daveed Diggs; Michael Patrick Thornton
- Country of origin: United States
- Original language: English

Production
- Executive producers: Ed Solomon; Robin Sweet; Ariel Kleiman
- Production companies: 20th Television; A24

Original release
- Network: Hulu

The Spot is an upcoming Hulu television series created by Ed Solomon. It is scheduled to premiere on January 13, 2027.

== Premise ==
A surgeon and her husband begin to fear she has caused a child's death in a hit and run accident.

== Cast ==
- Claire Danes as Lou Shadwick
- Ewan McGregor as Damon
- Macon Blair as Charlie
- Daveed Diggs as Brian Sherman
- Michael Patrick Thornton as Pete Porphyry

== Production ==
The project comes from Ed Solomon, A24 and 20th Television. It received a straight to series order from Hulu in August 2024. Solomon is creator, writer, executive producer and showrunner. Kate Winslet was attached to star and executive produce but left the project in June 2025 due to creative differences.

In October 2025, Claire Danes replaced Winslet, with Ewan McGregor joining the cast. In December 2025, Macon Blair, Daveed Diggs, and Michael Patrick Thornton joined the cast as series regulars.

Filming took place in Yonkers in January 2026.
