= The Jamz =

- Genre: Comedy
- Created by: Jim Kozyra and Chris Petlak
- Directed by: Ted Tremper
- Starring: Chris Petlak; Jim Kozyra; Kathy Najimy; Emily Peterson; David Pasquesi; Michael Patrick Thornton; Tamberla Perry; Rammel Chan
- Country of origin: United States
- Original language: English
- No. of seasons: 1
- No. of episodes: 4

Production
- Production location: Chicago
- Running time: 23-26 minutes

Original release
- Network: iTunes; Netflix
- Release: April 12, 2016

The Jamz is a half-hour workplace sitcom following the exploits of the crew at 101.7 THE JAMZ, Chicago's fictional #1-rated radio station.

The original concept for The Jamz, which was ordered straight-to-series by The Orchard, was created by Jim Kozyra and Chris Petlak, who serve as series regulars, writers, and co-executive producers.

Kozrya and Petlak were working at Chicago's 101.9 FM "The Mix" when they came up with the idea of a sitcom based on life at a radio station.

In 2012, Kozyra and Petlak raised a couple thousand dollars online to create a web series about life at a dysfunctional radio station. Because the eipodes received very little views, the two created a pilot for a full-fledged television series called “The Jamz” and submitted it to the New York Television Festival in 2014.

Episodes for Season 1 were released on iTunes April 12, 2016. The series premiered on Netflix April 30.

The series is shot in Chicago.

== Cast ==
- Chris Petlak as Jay-Jay
- Jim Kozyra as Fitzy
- David Pasquesi as Kasey
- Tamberla Perry as Geena
- Emily Peterson as Chrissy
- Kathy Najimy as Dan
- Vincent Teninty as Wyatt
- Michael Patrick Thornton as Stanton
- Rammel Chan as Intern
- Cedric Young as Suds
- Matt Kozlowski as Clancy
- Sarah Mitchell as Liz
- Amy Rapp as Julie

== Episodes ==
=== Season 1 (2016) ===
No. overall	No. in season	Title	Directed by	Written by
1	1	"The Pilot"	Ted Tremper	Jim Kozyra and Chris Petlak
When 101.7 FM THE JAMZ's morning show host retires, late-night DJs Jay‐Jay and Fitzy work to get out of the graveyard shift and into the morning gig. The only things stopping them are their disapproving boss, their competition, and their incompetence.
2	2	"The Gig"	Ted Tremper	Chris Petlak
Jay‐Jay and Geena battle for Kasey’s attention. Fitzy becomes Jay-Jay’s music manager, while Dan and Chrissy spy on Intern in an attempt to learn more about today’s youth culture.
3	3	"Saturday"	Ted Tremper	Jo Scott and Jeff Murdoch
After bumbling an on-air interview, Jay‐Jay and Fitzy are forced to attend an apology lunch with a major client. Chrissy moves out of her apartment with the aid of her coworkers, and Wyatt and Stanton surprise everyone with their professionalism.
4	4	"A New Hope"	Ted Tremper	Jim Kozyra
Jay-Jay becomes obsessed with his famous ex-girlfriend’s music videos. Fitzy accidentally leads Chrissy to believe that his mother is dead, and a very special guest shakes things up in the office.
