= The Red Line (TV series) =

American television series

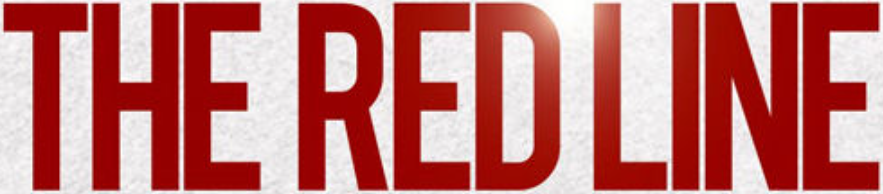
- Genre: Drama
- Created by: Caitlin Parrish; Erica Weiss
- Starring: Noah Wyle; Noel Fisher; Michael Patrick Thornton; Aliyah Royale; Vinny Chhibber; Emayatzy Corinealdi; Howard Charles
- Composers: Blake Neely; Sherri Chung
- Country of origin: United States
- Original language: English
- No. of seasons: 1
- No. of episodes: 8

Production
- Executive producers: Caitlin Parrish; Erica Weiss; Sunil Nayar; Ava DuVernay; Greg Berlanti; Sarah Schechter
- Running time: 42 minutes
- Production companies: Berlanti Productions; Forward Movement; Array Filmworks; CBS Television Studios; Warner Bros. Television

Original release
- Network: CBS
- Release: April 28 – May 19, 2019

The Red Line is an American drama limited television series created and written by Caitlin Parrish and Erica Weiss which premiered on CBS on April 28 and concluded on May 19, 2019.

It stars Noah Wyle, Emayatzy Corinealdi, Aliyah Royale, Noel Fisher, Michael Patrick Thornton, Vinny Chhibber, Howard Charles and Elizabeth Laidlaw. The title refers to a rapid transit line in Chicago, Illinois run by the Chicago Transit Authority (CTA) as part of the city's "L" system.

== Premise ==
In "The Red Line," the storyline centers on a Chicago police officer of Caucasian descent who shoots and kills an African American doctor. The narrative explores the lives of three families intertwined with the case:

The first family consists of the victim's husband and their adopted daughter. The second family involves the birth mother of the adopted daughter, who is running for city council and is married with a young son. The third family is that of the police officer, whose brother is a former police officer with a disability, and whose father is a retired police captain.

== Cast and characters ==
- Noah Wyle as Daniel Calder, a high school teacher whose husband, Harrison Brennan, is mistakenly shot by a Chicago Police Department (CPD) officer
- Noel Fisher as CPD Officer Paul Evans
- Michael Patrick Thornton as Jim Evans, Paul's paraplegic brother and former CPD officer
- Aliyah Royale as Jira Calder-Brennan, Daniel and Harrison's adopted teenage daughter
- Vinny Chhibber as Liam, Jira's literature teacher, Daniel's colleague and emerging love interest
- Emayatzy Corinealdi as Tia Young, Jira's birth mother, campaigning against the CPD's responsibility for the city's nearly 600 annual murders
- Howard Charles as Ethan Young, Tia's husband, a motorman on the Chicago Transit Authority’s elevated Red Line
- Elizabeth Laidlaw as Victoria “Vic” Renna, Paul's police partner
- Enuka Okuma as Suzanne Davis, Tia's sister and campaign manager
- Glynn Turman as Nathan Gordon, incumbent alderman and Tia's opponent

== Episodes ==
No.	Title	Directed by	Written by	Original release date	Prod. code	U.S. viewers (millions)
1	"We Must All Care"	Victoria Mahoney	Caitlin Parrish & Erica Weiss	April 28, 2019	T33.01004	4.80
2	"We Are Each Other's Harvest"	Kevin Hooks	Shernold Edwards	April 28, 2019	T33.10302	4.80
3	"For We Meet by One or the Other"	Aurora Guerrero	Sue Chung	May 5, 2019	T33.10303	3.88
4	"We Need Glory for a While"	Matthew A. Cherry	Aaron Carter	May 5, 2019	T33.10304	3.88
5	"One Day We May Be More Than a Body"	Sheelin Choksey	Fawzia Mirza	May 12, 2019	T33.10305	3.47
6	"We Turn Up This Music Louder Than a Mother's Cry"	Kevin Hooks	Brendan Kelly	May 12, 2019	T33.10306	3.47
7	"I Must Tell You What We Have Inherited"	DeMane Davis	Sunil Nayar	May 19, 2019	T33.10307	3.23
8	"This Victory Alone Is Not the Change We Seek"	Thomas Carter	Caitlin Parrish & Erica Weiss	May 19, 2019	T33.10308	3.23

== Production ==
=== Development ===
On February 5, 2018, it was announced that CBS had given the production a put pilot commitment after multiple networks had shown interest. The pilot was written by both Caitlin Parrish and Erica Weiss who was expected to executive produce alongside Ava DuVernay and Greg Berlanti. Production companies involved with the pilot were slated to consist of Berlanti Productions, Array Filmworks, CBS Television Studios and Warner Bros. Television. On March 1, 2018, it was announced that Victoria Mahoney would direct the pilot. On May 11, 2018, it was announced that CBS had given the production a series order. A few days later, it was announced that the series would premiere in the spring of 2019 as a mid-season replacement.

On June 7, 2019, CBS announced that The Red Line would not return for another season.

=== Casting ===
In February 2018, it was announced that Noel Fisher, Michael Patrick Thornton, Noah Wyle, Vinny Chhibber, Howard Charles and Elizabeth Laidlaw had joined the pilot's main cast.

== Reception ==
=== Critical response ===
On review aggregator Rotten Tomatoes, the series holds an approval rating of 72% based on 18 reviews, with an average rating of 6.8/10. The website's critical consensus reads, "If not always graceful, The Red Line is never less than empathetic, effectively applying tried and true storytelling techniques in its attempts to untangle complicated cultural issues." On Metacritic, it has a weighted average score of 65 out of 100, based on 16 critics, indicating "generally favorable reviews".

=== Ratings ===
Viewership and ratings per episode of The Red Line
No.	Title	Air date	Rating/share (18–49)	Viewers (millions)	DVR (18–49)	DVR viewers (millions)	Total (18–49)	Total viewers (millions)
1	"We Must All Care"	April 28, 2019	0.4/2	4.80	0.2	1.09	0.6	5.89
2	"We Are Each Other's Harvest"	April 28, 2019	0.4/2	4.80	0.2	1.09	0.6	5.89
3	"For We Meet by One or the Other"	May 5, 2019	0.4/2	3.88	TBD	TBD	TBD	TBD
4	"We Need Glory for a While"	May 5, 2019	0.4/2	3.88	TBD	TBD	TBD	TBD
5	"One Day We May Be More Than a Body"	May 12, 2019	0.3/2	3.47	0.2	0.91	0.5	4.38
6	"We Turn Up This Music Louder Than a Mother's Cry"	May 12, 2019	0.3/2	3.47	0.2	0.91	0.5	4.38
7	"I Must Tell You What We Have Inherited"	May 19, 2019	0.3/1	3.23	0.1	0.89	0.4	4.13
8	"This Victory Alone Is Not the Change We Seek"	May 19, 2019	0.3/1	3.23	0.1	0.89	0.4	4.13
