= Big Sky (American TV series) =

American crime drama thriller television series (2020–2023)

- Also known as: Big Sky: Deadly Trails (season 3)
- Genre: Crime drama; Thriller
- Created by: David E. Kelley
- Based on: The Highway series of books by C. J. Box
- Starring: Katheryn Winnick; Kylie Bunbury; Brian Geraghty; Valerie Mahaffey; Dedee Pfeiffer; Natalie Alyn Lind; Jesse James Keitel; Jade Pettyjohn; John Carroll Lynch; Ryan Phillippe; Ted Levine; Chad Willett; Anja Savcic; Janina Gavankar; Logan Marshall-Green; Omar Metwally; Jamie-Lynn Sigler; J. Anthony Pena; Jensen Ackles; Reba McEntire
- Music by: Trevor Morris
- Country of origin: United States
- Original language: English
- No. of seasons: 3
- No. of episodes: 47

Production
- Executive producers: C. J. Box; Gwyneth Horder-Payton; Paul McGuigan; Matthew Gross; Ross Fineman; David E. Kelley; Elwood Reid; Sharon Lee Watson; Jeff T. Thomas
- Producers: Matthew Tinker; Cecil O'Connor; Christina Toy; Zina Camblin; Michael Pendell
- Production locations: Pitt Meadows, British Columbia; Rio Rancho, New Mexico
- Cinematography: Oliver Bokelberg; Stephen McNutt; Jon Joffin; Shawn Maurer; Ken Glassing; Tim Sutherland
- Editors: David Beatty; Noah Pontell; Seagan Ngai; Colleen Rafferty; Jeff Asher; David P. Minor; Jill D'Agnenica; Amanda Bliss Taylor; David P. Minor
- Running time: 42–44 minutes
- Production companies: Fineman Entertainment; David E. Kelley Productions; A+E Studios; 20th Television

Original release
- Network: ABC
- Release: November 17, 2020 – January 18, 2023

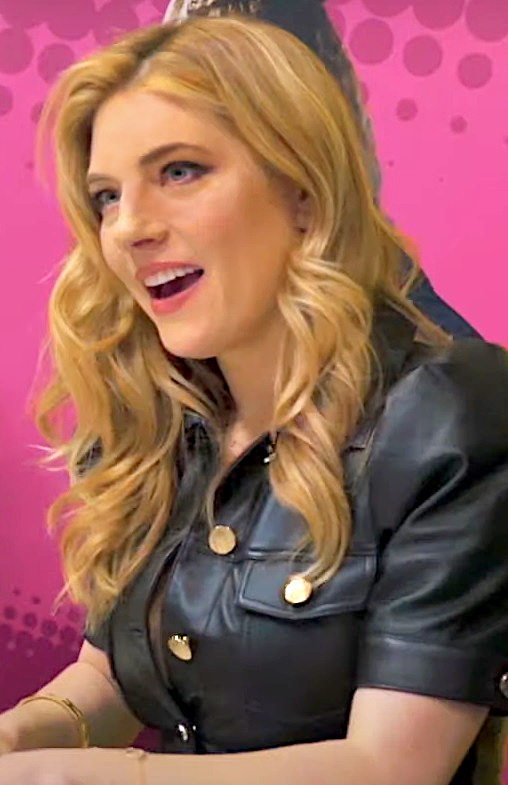
Katheryn Winnick as Jenny Hoyt

Big Sky is an American crime drama thriller television series created by David E. Kelley and based on The Highway series of books by C. J. Box. Katheryn Winnick and Kylie Bunbury star as a pair of investigators who team up to work on multiple cases in Montana. Dedee Pfeiffer also stars. Brian Geraghty, Jesse James Keitel, John Carroll Lynch, Anja Savcic, and Omar Metwally join them for the first two seasons, while Jamie-Lynn Sigler and J. Anthony Pena join them for the last two seasons. Also starring in the series are Valerie Mahaffey, Natalie Alyn Lind, Jade Pettyjohn, Ryan Phillippe and Ted Levine in the first season, Janina Gavankar and Logan Marshall-Green in the second season, and Jensen Ackles and Reba McEntire in the third season.

The series aired on ABC from November 17, 2020, to January 18, 2023. In May 2021, the series was renewed for a second season which premiered on September 30, 2021. In May 2022, the series was renewed for a third season, subtitled Deadly Trails, which premiered on September 21, 2022. In May 2023, the series was canceled after three seasons.

== Cast ==
=== Main ===
- Katheryn Winnick as Jenny Hoyt, an ex-cop who, despite being separated from her husband, still does freelance work for his agency; she later rejoins the Lewis and Clark County Sheriff's office as a deputy detective
- Kylie Bunbury as Cassie Dewell, a private detective who co-owns an agency called Dewell & Hoyt, which she initially runs with her romantic partner, Jenny's ex-husband Cody
- Brian Geraghty as Ronald Pergman (seasons 1–2), a long-haul trucker involved in several unsolved kidnappings
- Valerie Mahaffey as Helen Pergman (season 1), Ronald's mother
- Dedee Pfeiffer as Denise Brisbane, a receptionist for the Dewell & Hoyt agency who helps Jenny and Cassie with background research
- Natalie Alyn Lind as Danielle Sullivan (season 1), Grace's older sister and one of Ronald Pergman's kidnapping victims
- Jesse James Keitel as Jerrie Kennedy (season 1, special guest star season 2), a transfeminine former sex worker and aspiring singer, who later works for Dewell & Hoyt detective agency, and was one of Ronald's victims. The role made Keitel one of the first nonbinary actors to play a nonbinary series regular on primetime television.
- Jade Pettyjohn as Grace Sullivan (season 1), Danielle's younger sister, also kidnapped by Ronald
- John Carroll Lynch as Rick Legarski (season 1), a Montana Highway Patrol officer with a shady past, who is revealed to be Ronald's accomplice
  - Lynch as Wolfgang "Wolf" Legarski (season 2), Rick's twin brother
- Ryan Phillippe as Cody Hoyt (season 1), a troubled former cop who runs a private detective agency with his partner Cassie
- Ted Levine as Horst Kleinsasser (season 1), a ruthless rancher who must pass the torch to his estranged children after suffering a stroke
- Anja Savcic as Scarlet Leyendecker (season 2; recurring season 1), girlfriend of Ronald Pergman after he changes his persona and takes the name "Arthur"
- Janina Gavankar as Ren Bhullar (season 2), daughter of a drug lord who oversees the cartel's expansion in Montana
- Logan Marshall-Green as Travis Stone (season 2), a former lover of Jenny's who is a sheriff's deputy working undercover with a local drug ring
- Omar Metwally as Mark Lindor (season 2; special guest star season 1), a Deputy U.S. Marshal who has an interest in the Ronald Pergman case
- Jamie-Lynn Sigler as Tonya Walsh (season 3; recurring season 2), a former waitress at a local diner whose boyfriend mysteriously disappears. She later became an associate in the Bhullar drug business, and is now a real estate agent of her own firm
- J. Anthony Pena as Deputy Mo Poppernak (season 3; recurring season 2), Jenny's partner at the Lewis and Clark County sheriff's office
- Jensen Ackles as Beau Arlen (season 3; special guest star season 2), interim Sheriff of Lewis and Clark County following the shooting of Sheriff Tubb
- Reba McEntire (Note: McEntire is credited as a special guest star, but is a series regular.) as Sunny Barnes (season 3), a backcountry outfitter and the owner of Sunny Day Excursions

=== Special guest stars ===
- Darius Rucker as Possum (season 3)
- Lyle Lovett as Tex (season 3)

=== Recurring ===
- Brooke Smith as Merrilee Legarski (season 1), Rick's wife
- Gage Marsh as Justin Hoyt (season 1), Cody's and Jenny's son, whom Danielle and Grace were coming to visit when they were abducted
- Jeffrey Joseph as Joseph Dewell (seasons 1–2), Cassie's father and Kai's grandfather
- Gabriel Jacob-Cross as Kai Dewell (seasons 1–2), Cassie's son and Joseph's grandson
- Patrick Gallagher as Sheriff Walter Tubb, the sheriff of Lewis and Clark County
- Camille Sullivan as Joanie Sullivan (season 1), Danielle's and Grace's mother
- Chad Willett as Robert Sullivan (season 1), Danielle's and Grace's father
- Sharon Taylor as Commander Elena Sosa (season 1), twenty-year veteran of the Montana Highway Patrol and Rick Legarski's supervisor
- Zoë Noelle Baker as Phoebe Leyendecker (seasons 1–2), Scarlet's daughter
- Michael Raymond-James as Blake Kleinsasser (season 1), Horst's oldest son
- Britt Robertson as Cheyenne Kleinsasser (season 1), Horst's daughter
- Kyle Schmid as John Wayne "JW" Kleinsasser (season 1), Horst's second-born son
- Ryan Dorsey as Rand Kleinsasser (season 1), Horst's youngest son
- Michelle Forbes as Margaret Kleinsasser (season 1), Horst's wife
- Carlos Gómez as Gil Amaya (season 1), the Kleinsassers' former ranch manager
- Michelle Veintimilla as Rosie Amaya (season 1), Gil's daughter
- Sebastian Roché as Sheriff Wagy (season 1), the corrupt sheriff of Lochsa County
- Rachel Colwell as Angela (season 1), receptionist at the Lochsa County sheriff's office
- Arturo Del Puerto as T-Lock (season 2)
- Michael Malarkey as Deputy Harvey (season 2)
- T.V. Carpio as Rachel (season 2)
- Madelyn Kientz as Max (season 2)
- Jeremy Ray Taylor as Bridger (season 2)
- Troy Leigh-Anne Johnson as Harper (season 2)
- Lola Skye Reid as Madison (season 2)
- Romy Rosemont as Agatha (season 2)
- Ryan O'Nan as Donno (seasons 2–3), Ren's enforcer/ Tonya's business partner in season 3
- David Meunier as Dietrich (season 2)
- Vinny Chhibber as Jag Bhullar, Ren's brother (season 2)
- Jinder Mahal as Dhruv, Jag's enforcer (season 2)
- Constance Zimmer as Alicia (season 2)
- Bernard White as Veer Bhullar (season 2)
- Seth Gabel as Walter (season 3)
- Henry Ian Cusick as Avery (season 3), Beau’s ex-wife's new husband
- Rex Linn as Buck Barnes (season 3), Sunny's husband who is revealed to be the Bleeding Heart Killer
- Luke Mitchell as Cormac Barnes (season 3), Sunny and Buck's son
- Cree Cicchino as Emily Arlen (season 3), Beau's daughter
- Anirudh Pisharody as Luke (season 3)
- Madalyn Horcher as Paige (season 3)
- Sofia Embid as Mary (season 3)
- Rosanna Arquette as Virginia "Gigi" Cessna (season 3), (Note: Arquette is credited as a special guest star, but is recurring.) Jenny's mother who is a career criminal
- Angelique Cabral as Carla (season 3), Beau's ex-wife
- West Liang as Tony (season 3)

== Episodes ==
=== Series overview ===
Season	Episodes	Originally released	
Season	Episodes	First released	Last released
1	16	November 17, 2020	May 18, 2021
2	18	September 30, 2021	May 19, 2022
3	13	September 21, 2022	January 18, 2023

=== Season 1 (2020–21) ===
No. overall	No. in season	Title	Directed by	Written by	Original release date	Prod. code	U.S. viewers (millions)
1	1	"Pilot"	Paul McGuigan	David E. Kelley	November 17, 2020	1DHW01	4.15
Ronald Pergman, a 38-year-old unmarried long-haul trucker, abducts Jerrie, a sex worker he meets at a truck stop. Later, while driving on the highway, he comes across two young sisters, Danielle and Grace Sullivan, and kidnaps them as well after their car breaks down. Danielle's boyfriend Justin contacts his parents, former cops Cody and Jenny Hoyt. Cody, a private detective, reluctantly asks his ex-wife Jenny to assist even though she and his business partner Cassie Dewell despise each other. He also contacts Rick Legarski, a state patrolman who informs him that several other young women have disappeared along the same stretch of highway over the past few years. Danielle and Grace attempt to escape, but Ronald overpowers them and locks them, along with Jerrie, in an old shipping container in a remote location. The next morning, Cody meets up with Rick to begin the investigation and, during their talk, Cody suggests that a long-haul trucker might be behind the disappearances. They plan to go to the church to look for the long-haul trucker but, after they climb into Cody's truck, Rick pulls out a gun and shoots Cody in the head. It is revealed that Rick is Ronald's accomplice.
2	2	"Nowhere to Run"	Paul McGuigan	David E. Kelley	November 24, 2020	1DHW02	4.46
Cody has gone missing. Rick scolds Ronald for kidnapping Danielle and Grace, as they have families and friends who will look for them (unlike the prostitutes they've been taking). After talking with Rick, Cassie deduces he may be a sociopath who could be involved in the girls' and Cody's disappearances. Grace learns that Jerrie is transgender. The girls decide that Ronald might be a perverted "religious fanatic" and try to manipulate him by singing gospel songs. Ronald appears emotionally moved by their songs and troubled over what he may eventually have to do. Rick orders Ronald to prepare Jerrie for the handoff to the trafficking ring, though still undecided about the other two girls. Ronald takes Jerrie to shower and change. She removes a wig and insists Ronald look at her naked, forcing him to see why the trafficking ring would not want her. Ronald takes her back to the container and tells Rick. Now, none of the captives have any value to them. Unable to sleep that night, Ronald spoons with his mother Helen in her bed.
3	3	"The Big Rick"	Gwyneth Horder-Payton	David E. Kelley and Jonathan Shapiro	December 1, 2020	1DHW03	4.13
Cassie runs into Rick again; he threatens to arrest her "on whatever grounds I want" if she doesn't stop investigating the disappearances of the girls and Cody. Cassie is now convinced Rick is somehow involved, an opinion that is strengthened when Jenny learns that Cody never made it to the church/compound as intended. Helen confronts Ronald, saying she can tell he's up to no good. The girls manage to loosen a panel on the container and make a hole that only Grace can fit through. Grace tries to escape through a drainage culvert and Ronald follows her, but the culvert collapses between them and she escapes. She encounters a man fishing in a stream and begs him for help, but Rick appears and shoots the fisherman in the heart with a bow and arrow. She runs and Rick shoots her twice in the leg with the bow, disabling her. He ties her up, removes the arrows, leaving wounds that need disinfecting and stitches, and returns her to the container. As Ronald repairs the loose panel, she screams at him in a rage, saying she will escape again and defeat him.
4	4	"Unfinished Business"	Tasha Smith	Annakate Chappell & Matthew Tinker	December 8, 2020	1DHW04	3.51
The news is saturated with stories about Danielle and Grace's disappearance, which has Rick agitated. He finds other sex traffickers who will take all three girls, but will not pay for them. In the container, Grace's wounds have become infected and she has a high fever. She notices maggots on some canned meat the girls opened but did not eat; she asks the others to put the maggots on her wounds, as they are a slight disinfecting treatment. Ronald later disinfects Grace's wounds with hydrogen peroxide. He appears at the shop Rick's wife Merrilee owns, introduces himself as "Mitchell," and invites her to a dance, which she accepts. Jenny goes undercover as a prostitute at a truck stop to try to collect evidence and has an encounter with a trucker that almost escalates. Rick appears at the container and injects Grace's leg with a veterinary antibiotic. Jenny and Cassie track Rick's SUV to the site where the girls are being held. As they search the building, the girls hear them and start screaming for help. Cassie thinks she hears something, but Jenny fears Rick could return and they leave without rescuing the girls.
5	5	"A Good Day to Die"	Jennifer Lynch	Jonathan Shapiro	December 15, 2020	1DHW05	3.96
Cassie follows up on a hunch and obtains blueprints for the remote property where they tracked Rick, confirming there is a lower level they didn't check. She and Jenny convince Sheriff Tubb to bring a team of officers to the property, but only Rick is found there, as Ronald has moved the girls to the abandoned All-In truck stop. Tubb is scolded by Rick's MHP boss and prepares to arrest Cassie and Jenny for placing a tracker on a police vehicle. Jenny takes all the blame and only she is jailed. Helen accuses Ronald of being involved in the girls' disappearance, calling out his "perverted" urges. He starts choking her, but stops. Cassie is reminded, after interrogating Merrilee, that people are "creatures of habit" and she heads for the All-In alone. She encounters Rick standing at the bottom of a stairway and hears the girls' muffled screams.
6	6	"The Wolves Are Always Out for Blood"	Mark Tonderai	Maria Sten	January 26, 2021	1DHW06	3.84
Rick is in a coma after Cassie shot him in self-defense. Grace is hospitalized and she and Danielle describe Ronald as a "sweet psycho" to Cassie. After Cody's truck is unearthed, Jenny is determined to find the trucker the girls have described. Sheriff Tubb questions Cassie on the details of Rick's shooting and searches the Legarski home. Ronald plans on gaining entry into the Legarski house, believing Rick has evidence against him. Ronald also stalks Jerrie, knowing she got the best look at him at the truck stop. In Rick's hospital room, Jenny asks Merrilee how well she knows Rick. Cassie and Jerrie help Jenny get through the memorial service and Cassie later asks Jenny to become her investigative partner. Rick wakes from his coma.
7	7	"I Fall to Pieces"	Jennifer Lynch	Annakate Chappell & Matthew Tinker	February 2, 2021	1DHW07	3.66
Rick seems to have short-term memory loss of the past few years. The state troopers' union appoints him a ruthless attorney who threatens severe reprisals, even against Rick's doctors, if they cooperate with the police. Grace leads the police to the body of the fisherman that Rick killed and she makes a positive face-to-face ID of Rick as the killer and her abductor. Ronald tells Helen that he will kill, if necessary, to avoid capture. He repeatedly calls Merrilee, offering support and grooming her to invite him to her house so that he can retrieve any incriminating documents from Rick's safe room. As Ronald leaves for Merrilee's house, Helen reveals her intent to turn him in. The police produce an excellent sketch of Ronald based on Jerrie's input. Jenny and Cassie show the sketch to a stunned Merrilee.
8	8	"The End Is Near"	Hanelle Culpepper	Morenike Balogun	February 9, 2021	1DHW08	3.65
Cassie and Jenny look for clues in Legarski's house and find a hole Ronald made in the closet wall. Ronald's sketch hits the paper. Erik, a newsboy, sees Ronald while delivering his paper and makes the connection. When Erik tries to take a photo of the house, Ronald captures him and puts him in a cage in the basement. Erik's mother visits Denise at the detectives' office to say her son never returned home. A priest visits the Pergman home saying Helen missed her afternoon meeting, then hears Erik's muffled screams and banging. At the hospital, Cassie and Jenny both try to wriggle a confession out of Rick, but walk away convinced that he has no memory. Merrilee confronts him.
9	9	"Let It Be Him"	Michael Goi	Jonathan Shapiro	February 16, 2021	1DHW09	4.14
Rick has a nightmare about the prostitutes he sent to the trafficking ring and apologizes out loud. Merrilee hears the apology and tries to get the truth out of Rick again. The attorney tells Merrilee how Rick can avoid prison. Through clues Rick gives, Merrilee realizes he wanted to kill her when she caught him in their bedroom with a hammer and that he has been lying about his memory loss, so she kills him with the hammer. Ronald has been identified, so the police, Cassie, and Jenny go to his house and find it rigged to explode. Jenny carries out a hooded body just before the explosion. Ronald has taken Erik and is on the run in the priest's Tesla. Cassie and Jenny catch up to the vehicle and discover it was driving autonomously with Erik alive in the passenger seat, so they get in front to cause the vehicle to automatically stop. As the police arrive, Erik tells them that Ronald got out at an overpass several miles back. Ronald is then shown driving his big rig.
10	10	"Catastrophic Thinking"	Gwyneth Horder-Payton	Annakate Chappell & Matthew Tinker	April 13, 2021	1DHW10	3.43
Three months after the events of the previous episode, Ronald is shown with red hair and glasses, going by the name Arthur and dating a single mother named Scarlet. Jerrie, now working at Dewell & Hoyt, keeps getting phone calls with heavy breathing on the line. She's convinced it's Ronald. Meanwhile, Cassie and Jenny take a domestic case, tailing Alan Hedley whose wife, Naomi, suspects him of cheating. Instead, it turns out Alan is involved in an illegal money-making scheme with two accomplices who soon turn on him. Cassie and Jenny are visited by US Marshal Mark Lindor, who wants to help with the Pergman case. Elsewhere in Lochsa County, prominent rancher Horst Kleinsasser visits his son, Blake, in the county jail. Horst drops a handful of dirt into Blake's hands, saying that's all he will get of the ranch.
11	11	"All Kinds of Snakes"	Gwyneth Horder-Payton	Elwood Reid & Maria Sten	April 13, 2021	1DHW11	3.43
Mark has Cassie meet him at a junkyard where he's found a truck cab. He points out a panel in the sleeper cab that has "help me" and "Kelli" scratched into it. Jenny visits the Lochsa County jail after getting a call from Blake, revealed to be someone she once dated. Blake has been accused of physically assaulting Rosie, daughter of a ranch caretaker who was abruptly fired. Jenny is convinced that Blake, who stood to inherit the ranch, has been set up by the rest of his dysfunctional family, including siblings JW, Rand, and Cheyenne. It soon becomes clear that the Kleinsassers run the county. Jenny takes a back route into the ranch to check out the cabin where Rosie was assaulted and calls Cassie to join her. As Jenny runs into trouble with Rand, Cassie is arrested by a county sheriff and taken aback when the sheriff doesn't stop at the police station. Lindor views surveillance video of Ronald sleeping at his mother's grave. He later leaves a note for Ronald on the headstone. In the present, Ronald enters a remote shack, lighting a candle on a birthday cake that bears the name "Kelli."
12	12	"No Better Than Dogs"	Oliver Bokelberg	Elwood Reid & Brian McCauley Johnson	April 20, 2021	1DHW12	2.98
While singing at a bar, Jerrie sees Ronald in the crowd watching before he runs off. JW allows Jenny to search the caretaker cabin and she finds a blood-soaked bed with a bottle of whiskey underneath. Cassie is able to call Dewell & Hoyt from the back of the sheriff's car so they can hear her conversation and Mark arrives to use his connections and get Cassie released. Horst announces at a family breakfast that JW will inherit the ranch. Talking to Blake later, Horst hints at people finding out "what's really going on" at the ranch, while Blake brings up a sinister deed from the past. Blake is later shown uncovering the grave of someone named Cole when JW arrives and hits him in the face with the shovel while Cheyenne watches in the distance. Jenny locates a beaten Rosie, who talks about her and Blake being roofied and momentarily waking up to see Rand raping her. While going through Ronald's things, Scarlet finds Mark's note which reads "I am always with you." She confronts Ronald about it, shocking him with his own taser until she is satisfied with his explanation.
13	13	"White Lion"	Christina Alexandra Voros	Elwood Reid & Morenike Balogun	April 27, 2021	1DHW13	2.69
Cheyenne approaches JW to negotiate some demands in exchange for her help in hiding what he has done. Jenny continues to investigate Rosie's assault, but Rosie's own father urges Jenny to back off. Jenny approaches Angela, Sheriff Wagy's receptionist, to see what hold the Kleinsassers have over the police. Though Angela has to clam up when the Sheriff approaches, she slips a note to Jenny agreeing to talk to her later. Scarlet's sister Mary continues to insist that Ronald looks familiar. Ronald later sees a text from Mary on Scarlet's phone stating, "Arthur isn't who he says." After dropping off Scarlet and her daughter, Ronald goes to Mary's house. Cassie and Mark investigate and find a bloody footprint in the house, but no Ronald. They also find a dead body in the basement freezer, but determine it's been there a long time. Angela visits Jenny at her hotel room, but isn't able to say much before they hear a noise outside. Seconds later, a huge truck crashes through the room.
14	14	"Nice Animals"	Michael Goi	Elwood Reid & Jonathan Shapiro	May 4, 2021	1DHW14	2.62
Sheriff Wagy confronts Horst and says he can't protect Rand anymore. Cheyenne surprises Wagy in his vehicle and warns of changes that are coming. Margaret stands up to Horst, boldly stating she plans to kill him, and later tells JW she knows what he did. Ronald takes Scarlett and Phoebe to a camping area in his big rig, selecting a spot that has no cell service. Cassie and Mark comb through Mary's house. Mark says the body in the freezer is a male who disappeared about eight years ago. Jenny visits Cole's mother, who says Cole spoke of learning secrets on the ranch. Jenny and Cassie go back to Gil, who shows them a part of the ranch where Horst has allowed fracking companies to illegally dump toxic waste in exchange for huge cash payments. Horst subsequently paid Wagy to be his eyes and ears. Mark and Jerrie search Scarlet's home and learn from a neighbor that she and Phoebe left with a man in a big rig. Mark shows the man a photo of Ronald and the man confirms it's the guy he saw, but with different hair. Ronald gets caught by Phoebe while burying a body in the woods.
15	15	"Bitter Roots"	Alonso Alvarez-Barreda	Elwood Reid & Dominique A. Holmes	May 11, 2021	1DHW15	2.63
Ronald convinces Phoebe that he's burying a deer and says they must keep it a secret. Things go from bad to worse for the Kleinsassers. Sheriff Wagy and Deputy Gregor arrive at the ranch to investigate and are met at the entrance by Jenny and Cassie. Gregor tells an angry Cassie he was ordered to kill her, but chose not to. Wagy then says Gregor should have "put her in the ground" like he asked and Jenny records it on her phone, using it as leverage to keep her and Cassie safe. Scarlet gets a call from Lindor, who states that Mary is missing. Scarlet tells Ronald they have to go to Mary's house before the police find something she's hidden. She also admits to knowing Arthur is Ronald Pergman, stating they share a bond greater than love. When they arrive and find the freezer gone, they hear Mark and Jerrie breaking down the door and entering the house.
16	16	"Love is a Strange and Dangerous Thing"	Michael Goi	Elwood Reid & Annakate Chappell & Matthew Tinker	May 18, 2021	1DHW16	2.96
Ronald is captured by Mark and Jerrie, but not before telling Scarlet to retrieve the Legarski hard drive he's hidden in her house and call a contact he gives her. When Scarlet does so, she is visited by another Montana Highway Patrol officer who takes the hard drive and drives her away. At the Kleinsasser ranch, Wagy is arrested by state authorities. Margaret and Cheyenne join forces against Horst, later saying they can now run things how they want. In jail, Ronald makes a deal with Mark to give up key players in the trafficking ring and take him to the bodies if Mark takes the death penalty off the table. However, Ronald engineers an escape on the road with two masked gunmen. The second gunman drives Ronald to a site where he is reunited with Scarlet. The two are transferred to another vehicle, where they overtake the driver and take off on their own. Help arrives for a wounded Jenny, who tells Cassie to get Ronald. Cassie retrieves an assault rifle, steals a police car, and drives off in pursuit of him.

=== Season 2 (2021–22) ===
No. overall	No. in season	Title	Directed by	Written by	Original release date	Prod. code	U.S. viewers (millions)
17	1	"Wakey, Wakey"	Jeff T. Thomas	Elwood Reid	September 30, 2021	2DHW01	3.13
Cassie is still trying to locate Ronald, as Jenny decides she can operate better by rejoining the county sheriff's department and later finds herself catching up with an old friend who is currently undercover in a drug ring. She investigates a truck crash that resulted in missing drugs and money, while Cassie, Mark, and Jerrie locate the MHP officer who helped Scarlet, only to later find him murdered. Unknown to the detectives, four teens who were at the crash scene took the drugs and money. Meanwhile, Ronald has been chained up and imprisoned by someone who appears to be Legarski's twin brother.
18	2	"Huckleberry"	Christina Alexandra Voros	Sharon Lee Watson	October 7, 2021	2DHW02	2.78
Cartel member Ren comes to town with her footsoldier Donno, looking for the missing drugs and money. She and Donno take a hostage, waitress Tonya, who is unaware that her boyfriend stole the drugs and money before being killed. Bridger decides to report the crime to the police, but backs off when he recognizes Deputy Harvey as the man who shot and killed the thieves. Jenny is called to investigate the truck crash, as Cassie and Mark continue to search for Ronald. It's revealed that Wolf Legarski, Rick's twin, is trying to reform Ronald and that Scarlet is also on the property. The teens are at odds over what to do with the money, but Max uses some to get her mother's tooth fixed, rousing suspicion in her mom's boyfriend T-Lock. Harper suggests to her friends that she has connections who can help them sell the drugs.
19	3	"You Have to Play Along"	Tasha Smith	Kyle Long	October 14, 2021	2DHW03	2.85
The truck victims have been found in a river and Bridger checks it out after hearing about it on his police scanner. Ren arrives and has a brief conversation with Bridger. At the same time, Tonya briefly escapes from Donno, but he catches her fleeing to a remote diner and kills the owner in the melee. Jenny's friend Travis reveals he's heard that a cartel cleaner arrived in town. Cassie and Jerrie arrive at the diner too late. Max tells Harper of T-Lock's suspicions and suggests they move the drugs and money. Elsewhere, Ronald talks to Scarlet about escaping from Wolf, but Scarlet suggests they just play along for now. Cassie and Jerrie track clues to figure out where Tonya was taken and their truck pulls up as Ren and Donno wait in the building.
20	4	"Gettin' Right to It"	Rob Seidenglanz	Mike Flynn	October 21, 2021	2DHW04	2.78
As Cassie and Jerrie approach, Ren pretends to be someone assigned to the job site while Donno hides Tonya. Later, Tonya is allowed to escape so she can go to the detective's office to lie about Deputy Harvey killing the diner owner. Harper and Max prepare to sell the drugs, but stop when Harper gets a call from Harvey, who has taken Bridger hostage. Sheriff Tubb is reluctant to go after Harvey based solely on Tonya's testimony, saying he needs stronger evidence. Jenny and Cassie see signs that a war is brewing between local drug lords and the Vancouver cartel that has come to town. Frustrated with Ronald, Wolf fits him with a choke collar. Max, Harper, and Madison hatch a plan to ensure Harvey doesn't kill them when they return the drugs and money in exchange for Bridger.
21	5	"Mother Nurture"	Darren Grant	Annakate Chappell	November 11, 2021	2DHW05	2.74
As they approach the cabin where Harvey is holding Bridger, Jenny and Cassie are shot at from a distance by Donno. Madison and Harper draw Harvey into the woods where the bags are, giving Max time to release Bridger, but Ren shows up and Bridger recognizes her. When Harvey pulls a gun on Harper, the mysterious man who had been following the teens jumps him and kills Harvey with his own gun during a tussle. Tonya visits Ren and Donno, saying she can help them launder the cartel's money. Jerrie learns her estranged mother is dying and makes the painful decision to see her one last time. Wolf feels like he's making progress with Ronald and reveals he's trying to sell a book about the experience. At a bar, Cassie and Jenny see Dietrich and follow him outside. They scuffle with one of Dietrich's crew and Travis shows up, telling Dietrich the two women are cops.
22	6	"Heart-shaped Charm"	Ben Hernandez Bray	Ryan O'Nan	November 18, 2021	2DHW06	2.79
The confrontation between Dietrich, Jenny, and Cassie is quickly resolved. Harper meets again with the man who helped them. He warns her and it is shown that he is hurt. Cassie grows suspicious of Max after noticing her keychain is identical to the one found nearby the crime scene and decides to confront her. Cassie meets T-Lock. Harper tells Max that she lost her keychain. Travis meets up with Jenny, unaware that Smiley followed him. Mark has an address for Legarski's brother. T-Lock confronts Max about the drugs and blackmails her into giving them to him. Smiley confronts Trevor about Jenny. Mark visits Wolf. Donno has Travis tied and hanging from his hands as Ren watches the beating. T-Lock goes to see Smiley, giving him a sample of the drugs. Donno and Ren break down Smiley's door. Smiley almost overtakes Donno, but Ren stabs him in the back with a kitchen knife. Donno finds the drugs. Travis and Jenny get into an argument. Dietrich breaks down the door and takes Travis for a ride while Jenny is hiding. Mark goes back to Wolf's place, gun aimed.
23	7	"Little Boxes"	Lisa Leone	Brian McCauley Johnson	December 9, 2021	2DHW07	2.43
24	8	"The End Has No End"	Jeff T. Thomas	Dominique A. Holmes	December 16, 2021	2DHW08	2.55
25	9	"Trust Issues"	Tanya Hamilton	Matthew Tinker	February 24, 2022	2DHW09	2.63
26	10	"Happy Thoughts"	Blackhorse Lowe	Elwood Reid & Benjy Steinberg	March 3, 2022	2DHW10	2.30
27	11	"Do No Harm"	Nina Lopez-Corrado	Annakate Chappell	March 10, 2022	2DHW11	2.45
28	12	"A Good Boy"	Oliver Bokelberg	Sharon Lee Watson & Ryan O'Nan	March 17, 2022	2DHW12	2.42
29	13	"The Shipping News"	Darren Grant	Kyle Long & Mike Flynn	March 24, 2022	2DHW13	2.81
30	14	"Dead Man's Float"	Lisa Leone	Brian McCauley Johnson & Dominique A. Holmes	March 31, 2022	2DHW14	2.46
31	15	"The Muffin or the Hammer"	Christina Alexandra Voros	Sharon Lee Watson & Ryan O'Nan	April 7, 2022	2DHW15	2.57
32	16	"Keys to the Kingdom"	Claudia Yarmy	Sharon Lee Watson & Dominique A. Holmes	May 5, 2022	2DHW16	2.40
33	17	"Family Matters"	Loren Yaconelli	Kyle Long & Brian McCauley Johnson	May 12, 2022	2DHW17	2.13
34	18	"Catch a Few Fish"	Jeff T. Thomas	Elwood Reid	May 19, 2022	2DHW18	2.41

=== Season 3: Deadly Trails (2022–23) ===
No. overall	No. in season	Title	Directed by	Written by	Original release date	Prod. code	U.S. viewers (millions)
35	1	"Do You Love An Apple"	Jeff T. Thomas	Elwood Reid & Sharon Lee Watson	September 21, 2022	3DHW01	2.26
After encountering a mysterious man in the wilderness, a hiker falls off a cliff to his death. Investigating it as a missing persons case because no body is found, Jenny and Beau question Sunny Barnes, proprietor of Sunny Day Excursions. Sunny vows to offer her assistance, but she's later shown bringing food to the mysterious man. Elsewhere, Tonya and Donno are running a diner and Tonya has also started a real estate business. Using threats that she's still investigating their connection to the Bhullars, Cassie cajoles Tonya into selling her the ranch her late father coveted at a below-market price.
36	2	"The Woods Are Lovely, Dark and Deep"	Kelli Williams	Kyle Long & Christine Roum	September 28, 2022	3DHW02	1.95
Jenny and Beau reluctantly investigate Tonya's complaint about a squatter on one of her properties and learn the squatter is a whistleblower hiding from his corrupt and dangerous aviation company employers. Sunny chastises her son for leaving his restricted area, then watches the victim who fell off the cliff die. Denise tells Cassie and later Jenny about a girl who was found at the bottom of the same cliff 20 years ago and says there have been other similar disappearances. Later, a couple supposedly celebrating a birthday, but really hiding out until a large stash of money is available, gets lost on the excursion trails. Sunny agrees to let some patrons look for them, including Beau's daughter and her stepfather. The daughter sees the male half of the lost couple washing off blood in a river, then retreats.
37	3	"A Brief History of Crime"	Nimisha Mukerji	Annakate Chappell & Brian McCauley Johnson	October 5, 2022	3DHW03	2.28
38	4	"Carrion Comfort"	Jeff T. Thomas	Ryan O'Nan & Dominique A. Holmes	October 12, 2022	3DHW04	2.33
39	5	"Flesh and Blood"	Lisa Leone	Sharon Lee Watson & Benjy Steinberg	October 19, 2022	3DHW05	2.24
40	6	"The Bag and the Box"	Laura Nisbet-Peters	Kyle Long & Jason Wilborn	October 26, 2022	3DHW06	2.59
41	7	"Come Get Me"	Tori Garrett	Christine Roum & Annakate Chappell	November 2, 2022	3DHW07	2.22
42	8	"Duck Hunting"	Blackhorse Lowe	Sharon Lee Watson & Ryan O'Nan	November 16, 2022	3DHW08	2.24
43	9	"Where There's Smoke There's Fire"	Keith Powell	Kyle Long & Brian McCauley Johnson	November 30, 2022	3DHW09	2.38
44	10	"A Thin Layer of Rock"	Ben Hernandez Bray	Jason Wilborn & Dominique A. Holmes	December 7, 2022	3DHW10	2.25
45	11	"Super Foxes"	Lisa Leone	Christine Roum & Ryan O'Nan	January 4, 2023	3DHW11	2.33
46	12	"Are You Mad?"	Ben Hernandez Bray	Jason Wilborn & Annakate Chappell	January 11, 2023	3DHW12	2.23
47	13	"That Old Feeling"	Jeff T. Thomas	Elwood Reid & Dominique A. Holmes & Brian McCauley Johnson	January 18, 2023	3DHW13	2.40

== Production ==
=== Development ===
The series, based on C. J. Box's novel The Highway and developed by David E. Kelley, was announced as The Big Sky in January 2020 and given a straight-to-series order by ABC. The series is produced by David E. Kelley Productions, A+E Studios and 20th Television. Kelley and Ross Fineman serve as executive producers, along with Box, Matthew Gross and Paul McGuigan. On June 17, 2020, it was announced that the series would air on Tuesdays at 10:00/9:00c. On December 7, 2020, ABC gave the series a six-episode back order, bringing the total number of first-season episodes ordered to 16. On May 4, 2021, ABC renewed the series for a second season. It was also reported that Elwood Reid who was added as an executive producer for the second half of the first season took the second season from Kelley. However, Kelley is still involved with the series and remains as an executive producer. On May 13, 2022, ABC renewed the series for a third season. The subtitle for the third season is Deadly Trails. On May 12, 2023, ABC canceled the series after three seasons.

=== Casting ===
John Carroll Lynch, Dedee Pfeiffer, Ryan Phillippe, and Katheryn Winnick were the first cast additions announced through February 2020. In March 2020, Brian Geraghty, Kylie Bunbury, Natalie Alyn Lind and Jesse James Keitel were added, with Bunbury in the co-lead role. On June 24, 2020, it was announced that Jade Pettyjohn joined the cast in a starring role. On August 6, 2020, Valerie Mahaffey joined the main cast. On October 8, 2020, Brooke Smith, Jeffery Joseph, Gage Marsh, and Gabriel Jacob-Cross were cast in recurring roles. in December 2020, Camille Sullivan, Chad Willett, Patrick Gallagher, and Sharon Taylor joined the cast in recurring capacities. In January 2021, Ted Levine was cast as a new series regular while Kyle Schmid, Michelle Forbes, Britt Robertson, Michael Raymond-James, Ryan Dorsey and Omar Metwally were cast in recurring roles. On April 12, 2021, Carlos Gómez, Anja Savcic, and Zoë Noelle Baker joined the cast in recurring roles. On July 20, 2021, Metwally was promoted as a series regular for the second season. On August 17, 2021, Janina Gavankar was cast as new series regular while Savcic was promoted as a series regular and Keitel was demoted to recurring for the second season. Two days later, Jamie-Lynn Sigler, Madelyn Kientz, Troy Johnson, Lola Reid, Jeremy Ray Taylor, T.V. Carpio, and Arturo Del Puerto joined the cast in recurring roles for the second season. On August 24, 2021, Logan Marshall-Green was cast a new series regular for the second season. On August 26, 2021, Lynch confirmed that he is set to return in some capacity for the second season. On September 21, 2021, Vinny Chhibber, Romy Rosemont, Ryan O'Nan, Michael Malarkey, and David Meunier joined the cast in recurring roles for the second season. in February 2022, Constance Zimmer and Bernard White were cast in recurring roles for the second season. On May 12, 2022, it was reported that Jensen Ackles is set to guest star for the second-season finale. The next day, it was announced that Ackles and Sigler had been promoted to series regulars for the third season. A few days later, Reba McEntire was cast a series regular for the third season. On July 18, 2022, it was announced that J. Anthony Pena was promoted to a series regular while Luke Mitchell, Seth Gabel, Henry Ian Cusick, Anirudh Pisharody, and Madalyn Horcher were cast in recurring roles for the third season. On August 5, 2022, Rosanna Arquette joined the cast in a recurring role for the third season. The following week, Rex Linn was cast in an undisclosed capacity for the third season. On September 9, 2022, Angelique Cabral joined the cast in an undisclosed capacity for the third season. A few days later, it was announced that Metwally won't be a series regular for the third season due to a scheduling conflict, but may return for a few episodes later in the season. One week later, it was confirmed that Jesse James Keitel, Anja Savcic, Janina Gavankar, Logan Marshall-Green and Vinny Chhibber won't return for the third season. On October 5, 2022, it was announced that Lyle Lovett and Darius Rucker are set to guest star on an episode for the third season.

=== Filming ===
Filming on the series' first season began on August 27, 2020, and concluded on April 24, 2021, in Vancouver, with the outdoor, mountainous wilderness around Squamish and Fraser Valley, plus various other locations in British Columbia with aerial shots of Helena, Montana's capital. Filming was originally set to take place in Albuquerque, New Mexico, and Las Vegas, Nevada, but the series was moved to Vancouver in July 2020, due to the COVID-19 pandemic in the United States. The series was one of many American television productions in Vancouver that briefly halted filming in late September 2020, due to delays in receiving cast and crew COVID-19 test results. On August 12, 2021, it was reported that the second season is scheduled to film in Rio Rancho, New Mexico from August 2021 through April 2022.

== Release ==
=== Marketing ===
On September 9, 2020, ABC released the first teaser for the series.

=== Broadcast ===
Big Sky aired on ABC from November 17, 2020 to January 18, 2023. Big Sky airs in Canada on CTV, simulcast with ABC in the United States. In India, the series was streamed on Disney+ Hotstar along with ABC. Internationally, the series premiered on Disney+ under the dedicated streaming hub Star as an original series, on February 23, 2021, and in Latin America the series premiered on August 31, 2021, on Star+.

The second season premiered on September 30, 2021, on ABC. The third season premiered on September 21, 2022, on ABC.

== Reception ==
=== Critical response ===
For the series, review aggregator Rotten Tomatoes reported an approval rating of 61% based on 28 critic reviews, with an average rating of 6/10. The website's critics consensus reads, "Big Sky's shaky setup doesn't do it many favors, but viewers who can push through may find its fast-paced, twisty mystery compelling enough." Metacritic gave the series a weighted average score of 54 out of 100 based on 18 critic reviews, indicating "mixed or average reviews".

=== Ratings ===
==== Overall ====
Viewership and ratings per season of Big Sky
Season	Timeslot (ET)	Episodes	First aired		Last aired		TV season	Viewership rank	Avg. viewers (millions)	18–49 rank	Avg. 18–49 rating
Season	Timeslot (ET)	Episodes	Date	Viewers (millions)	Date	Viewers (millions)	TV season	Viewership rank	Avg. viewers (millions)	18–49 rank	Avg. 18–49 rating
1	Tuesday 10:00 pm	16	November 17, 2020	4.15	May 18, 2021	2.96	2020–21	26	7.35	26	1.1
2	Thursday 10:00 pm	18	September 30, 2021	3.13	May 19, 2022	2.41	2021–22	44	5.65	57	0.6
3	Wednesday 10:00 pm	13	September 21, 2022	2.26	January 18, 2023	2.40	2022–23	TBD	TBD	TBD	TBD

==== Season 1 ====
Viewership and ratings per episode of Big Sky
No.	Title	Air date	Rating (18–49)	Viewers (millions)	DVR (18–49)	DVR viewers (millions)	Total (18–49)	Total viewers (millions)
1	"Pilot"	November 17, 2020	0.7	4.15	0.8	4.56	1.5	8.71
2	"Nowhere to Run"	November 24, 2020	0.7	4.46	0.7	4.00	1.4	8.46
3	"The Big Rick"	December 1, 2020	0.7	4.13	0.6	3.85	1.3	7.98
4	"Unfinished Business"	December 8, 2020	0.6	3.51	0.7	4.11	1.3	7.62
5	"A Good Day to Die"	December 15, 2020	0.6	3.96	—N/a	—N/a	—N/a	—N/a
6	"The Wolves Are Always Out for Blood"	January 26, 2021	0.6	3.84	—N/a	—N/a	—N/a	—N/a
7	"I Fall to Pieces"	February 2, 2021	0.6	3.66	0.5	3.19	1.1	6.85 (Note: Live+3 day ratings have been used due to the unavailability of Live+7 day ratings.)
8	"The End Is Near"	February 9, 2021	0.6	3.65	0.7	4.30	1.3	7.95
9	"Let It Be Him"	February 16, 2021	0.7	4.14	0.6	4.04	1.3	8.18
10–11	"Catastrophic Thinking" / "All Kinds of Snakes"	April 13, 2021	0.5	3.43	0.5	3.63	1.0	7.06
12	"No Better Than Dogs"	April 20, 2021	0.4	2.98	0.5	3.42	0.9	6.40
13	"White Lion"	April 27, 2021	0.4	2.69	0.5	3.59	0.9	6.28
14	"Nice Animals"	May 4, 2021	0.4	2.62	0.5	3.51	0.9	6.13
15	"Bitter Roots"	May 11, 2021	0.4	2.63	0.5	3.36	0.8	5.99
16	"Love is a Strange and Dangerous Thing"	May 18, 2021	0.4	2.96	0.5	3.50	0.9	6.46

==== Season 2 ====
Viewership and ratings per episode of Big Sky
No.	Title	Air date	Rating (18–49)	Viewers (millions)	DVR (18–49)	DVR viewers (millions)	Total (18–49)	Total viewers (millions)
1	"Wakey, Wakey"	September 30, 2021	0.4	3.13	—N/a	—N/a	—N/a	—N/a
2	"Huckleberry"	October 7, 2021	0.3	2.78	—N/a	—N/a	—N/a	—N/a
3	"You Have to Play Along"	October 14, 2021	0.3	2.85	0.3	3.17	0.7	6.02
4	"Gettin' Right to It"	October 21, 2021	0.4	2.78	0.4	3.42	0.7	6.20
5	"Mother Nurture"	November 11, 2021	0.3	2.74	—N/a	—N/a	—N/a	—N/a
6	"Heart-shaped Charm"	November 18, 2021	0.3	2.79	0.4	3.23	0.7	6.02
7	"Little Boxes"	December 9, 2021	0.3	2.43	0.4	3.36	0.7	5.78
8	"The End Has No End"	December 16, 2021	0.3	2.55	—N/a	—N/a	—N/a	—N/a
9	"Trust Issues"	February 24, 2022	0.3	2.63	—N/a	—N/a	—N/a	—N/a
10	"Happy Thoughts"	March 3, 2022	0.3	2.30	—N/a	—N/a	—N/a	—N/a
11	"Do No Harm"	March 10, 2022	0.3	2.45	0.4	2.83	0.6	5.30
12	"A Good Boy"	March 17, 2022	0.3	2.42	0.3	2.72	0.5	5.13
13	"The Shipping News"	March 24, 2022	0.3	2.81	0.4	2.81	0.7	5.62
14	"Dead Man's Float"	March 31, 2022	0.3	2.46	0.3	2.76	0.6	5.23
15	"The Muffin or the Hammer"	April 7, 2022	0.3	2.57	0.3	2.73	0.6	5.29
16	"Keys to the Kingdom"	May 5, 2022	0.3	2.40	—N/a	—N/a	—N/a	—N/a
17	"Family Matters"	May 12, 2022	0.2	2.13	—N/a	—N/a	—N/a	—N/a
18	"Catch a Few Fish"	May 19, 2022	0.3	2.41	—N/a	—N/a	—N/a	—N/a

==== Season 3 ====
Viewership and ratings per episode of Big Sky
No.	Title	Air date	Rating (18–49)	Viewers (millions)	DVR (18–49)	DVR viewers (millions)	Total (18–49)	Total viewers (millions)
1	"Do You Love An Apple"	September 21, 2022	0.3	2.26	0.2	2.63	0.5	4.89
2	"The Woods Are Lovely, Dark and Deep"	September 28, 2022	0.2	1.95	0.3	2.66	0.5	4.60
3	"A Brief History of Crime"	October 5, 2022	0.2	2.28	0.3	2.78	0.5	5.06
4	"Carrion Comfort"	October 12, 2022	0.3	2.33	0.3	2.53	0.6	4.86
5	"Flesh and Blood"	October 19, 2022	0.2	2.24	0.2	2.40	0.5	4.64
6	"The Bag and the Box"	October 26, 2022	0.3	2.59	0.3	2.36	0.6	4.95
7	"Come Get Me"	November 2, 2022	0.3	2.22	0.2	2.27	0.5	4.49
8	"Duck Hunting"	November 16, 2022	0.2	2.24	0.3	2.61	0.5	4.86
9	"Where There's Smoke There's Fire"	November 30, 2022	0.3	2.38	—N/a	—N/a	—N/a	—N/a
10	"A Thin Layer of Rock"	December 7, 2022	0.2	2.25	—N/a	—N/a	—N/a	—N/a
11	"Super Foxes"	January 4, 2023	0.2	2.33	0.3	2.57	0.5	4.90
12	"Are You Mad?"	January 11, 2023	0.2	2.23	0.3	2.48	0.5	4.70
13	"That Old Feeling"	January 18, 2023	0.3	2.40	0.3	2.44	0.5	4.85

=== Accolades ===
Year	Award	Category	Nominee(s)	Result	Ref.
2021	Leo Awards	Best Overall Sound in a Dramatic Series	Kristian Bailey	Nominated	
2021	Hollywood Critics Association Television Awards	Best Broadcast Network Series, Drama	Big Sky	Nominated	
2021	Hollywood Critics Association Television Awards	Best Supporting Actor in a Broadcast Network or Cable Series, Drama	John Carroll Lynch	Nominated	
2021	Hollywood Critics Association Television Awards	Best Supporting Actress in a Broadcast Network or Cable Series, Drama	Brooke Smith	Nominated	
2021	ReFrame Stamp	IMDbPro Top 200 Scripted TV Recipients	Big Sky	Won	
2022	Satellite Awards	Best Actor in a Supporting Role in a Series, Miniseries, Limited Series or Motion Picture Made for Television	John Carroll Lynch	Nominated	
2022	Satellite Awards	Best Actress in a Supporting Role in a Series, Miniseries, Limited Series or Motion Picture Made for Television	Anja Savcic	Nominated	
2022	ReFrame Stamp	IMDbPro Top 200 Scripted TV Recipients	Big Sky	Won	
2022	Golden Trailer Awards	Best Action/Thriller TrailerByte for a TV/Streaming Series	Big Sky	Nominated	
2022	Saturn Awards	Best Network or Cable Action/Thriller Television Series	Big Sky	Nominated	
2022	Saturn Awards	Best Actress in a Network or Cable Television Series	Kylie Bunbury	Nominated	
2022	Saturn Awards	Best Supporting Actress in a Network or Cable Television Series	Janina Gavankar	Nominated	
2022	Saturn Awards	Best Guest-Starring Performance in a Network or Cable Television Series	Jessie James Keitel	Nominated	

=== Controversy ===
After the pilot aired, members of the Rocky Mountain Tribal Leaders Council, Coushatta Tribe of Louisiana, Global Indigenous Council, Great Plains Tribal Chairmen's Association, and the Union of British Columbia Indian Chiefs (UBCIC), among others, addressed a letter to ABC Entertainment President Karey Burke and series creator David E. Kelley, accusing the show of "at best, cultural insensitivity, and at worst, appropriation" due to being set in an area with a disproportionately high rate of Murdered and Missing Indigenous Women & Girls (MMIWG), yet not having any tribal representation in the show."
