= Claire Danes =

American actor (born 1979)

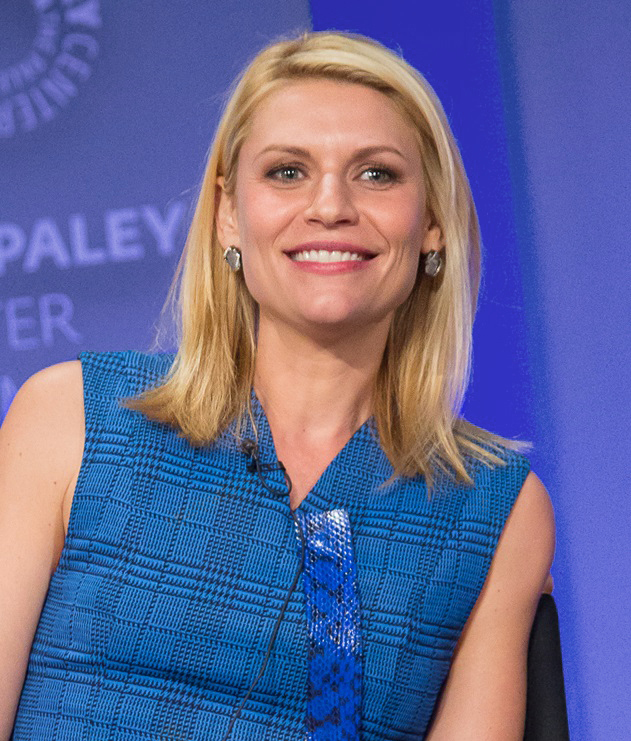
- Danes in 2015
- Born: Claire Catherine Danes; April 12, 1979 (age 47); New York City, U.S.
- Occupation: Actress
- Years active: 1992–present
- Spouse: Hugh Dancy (m. 2009)
- Children: 3

Claire Catherine Danes (born April 12, 1979) is an American actress. (Note: Danes refers to herself as an actor.) Prolific in film and television since her teens, she is the recipient of two Actor Awards, three Primetime Emmy Awards and four Golden Globe Awards. She was awarded a star on the Hollywood Walk of Fame in 2015 and Time Magazine named her one of the 100 most influential people in the world in 2012 and 2026.

Danes first gained recognition for starring in the 1994 teen drama series My So-Called Life, winning a Golden Globe Award for Best Actress – Television Series Drama and receiving a nomination for the Primetime Emmy Award for Outstanding Lead Actress in a Drama Series. She made her film debut playing Beth March in Little Women (1994), and gained wider fame for starring as Juliet in the romance Romeo + Juliet (1996). She then acted in The Rainmaker (1997), Les Misérables (1998), Brokedown Palace (1999), The Hours (2002), Igby Goes Down (2002), Terminator 3: Rise of the Machines (2003), Shopgirl (2005), The Family Stone (2005), Evening (2007), and Stardust (2007).

Danes expanded her career on television portraying the title character in the HBO film Temple Grandin (2010) earning the Primetime Emmy Award for Outstanding Lead Actress in a Limited Series or Movie. She then portrayed Carrie Mathison in the Showtime drama series Homeland (2011–2020) for which she earned two Primetime Emmy Awards for Outstanding Lead Actress in a Drama Series. She has since starred in the Apple TV series The Essex Serpent (2022), the Max mystery series Full Circle (2023), the FX on Hulu miniseries Fleishman Is in Trouble (2022), and the Netflix thriller series The Beast in Me (2025–present), receiving Emmy Award nominations for the latter two.

On stage, Danes appeared in an Off-Broadway production of The Vagina Monologues (2000) and made her Broadway debut playing Eliza Doolittle in a 2007 revival of the George Bernard Shaw play Pygmalion. She has been married to fellow actor Hugh Dancy since 2009.

== Early life and education ==
Claire Catherine Danes was born April 12, 1979 in Manhattan, New York City, the daughter of Carla Danes (née Hall), a sculptor and printmaking artist, and Christopher Danes, a photographer. Her older brother, Asa, is a lawyer. During Danes's childhood, her mother ran a small toddler day care center called "Danes Tribe" out of the family's SoHo loft, and later she served as Danes's manager. Danes's father worked as a residential general contractor in New York for 20 years in a company he ran called "Overall Construction". He also worked as a photographer and computer consultant. Danes is named after her paternal grandmother, Claire Danes (née Tomowske). Danes describes her ethnic origins as "as WASPy as you can get".

The family lived in an artist's loft on Crosby Street. Danes attended P.S. 3 and P.S. 11 for elementary school and Professional Performing Arts School for junior high school. She attended the New York City Lab School for Collaborative Studies in Manhattan, where her future Homeland co-star Morena Baccarin and she were classmates. She attended The Dalton School for one year of high school before moving with her parents to Santa Monica, California, for the role in My So-Called Life. They moved two days after the 1994 Northridge earthquake.

Danes graduated from the Lycée Français de Los Angeles in 1997. In 1998, she began studies at Yale University. After studying for two years as a psychology major, she dropped out to focus on her film career.

Danes started studying dance when she was six years old. She took dance classes from Ellen Robbins at Dance Theater Workshop and acting classes at HB Studio the Lee Strasberg Theatre and Film Institute at the age of 10, and appeared in theater and video productions in New York City. Although she continued to dance, Danes said that her focus shifted to acting by the time she was nine years old.

Her audition with Miloš Forman when she was 11 led to roles in several student films. She signed with agent Karen Friedman at the Writers & Artists talent agency at age 12.

== Career ==
=== 1993–1999: Teen actor and film stardom ===
In 1993 at age 13, Danes got her first big job working on the Dudley Moore TV sitcom pilot called Dudley, which was shot at Silvercup Studios in Astoria, Queens. Later that same year, Danes played a 15-year-old teenage murderer in a guest starring role on Law & Order in the season three episode "Skin Deep". She appeared in an episode of HBO's Lifestories: Families in Crisis entitled "The Coming out of Heidi Leiter". She then starred as the 15-year-old Angela Chase in the television drama series My So-Called Life. In March 1993, a pilot episode was shot; it would be almost another year and a half before broadcast. For her role, she won a Golden Globe Award and received an Emmy nomination. Despite being canceled after only 19 episodes, My So-Called Life has developed a large cult following. In 1995, she starred in the Soul Asylum music video for "Just Like Anyone".

Danes played Beth March in the 1994 film adaptation of Little Women. Although ABC canceled My So-Called Life in 1995, her higher profile led to being cast in several film roles, including 1995's Home for the Holidays and 1996's I Love You, I Love You Not and To Gillian on Her 37th Birthday. Her first leading role on the big screen came in 1996, when she portrayed Juliet in the film Romeo + Juliet, inspiring director Baz Luhrmann to call her, at age 16, "the Meryl Streep of her generation". Later that year, it was reported that she turned down the female lead role in Titanic. In 1997, Danes wrote an introduction to Neil Gaiman's Death: The Time of Your Life. Also in 1997, Danes played abused wife Kelly Riker in The Rainmaker, directed by Francis Ford Coppola, as well as Jenny in Oliver Stone's noir U Turn. In 1998, she played several very different roles: Cosette in Les Misérables, and the pregnant teenage daughter of Polish immigrants in Polish Wedding. In 1999, she made her first appearance in an animated feature with the English version of Princess Mononoke. That same year, she played the role of Julie Barnes in the big screen adaptation of the 1970s TV show The Mod Squad. She also starred in Brokedown Palace.

=== 2000–2009: Established actor ===
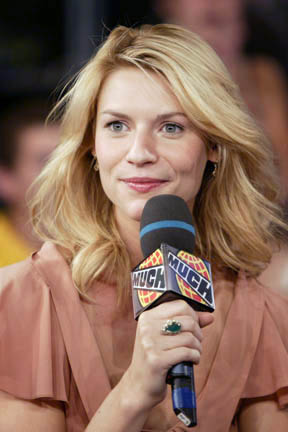
Danes in Toronto, for a MuchOnDemand promotion of Stardust, 2007

Danes left her career temporarily to attend Yale, having made 13 films in five years. Danes got her start in New York City theater appearing in performances of Happiness, Punk Ballet, and Kids Onstage, for which she choreographed her own dance. In April 2000, she appeared off Broadway in Eve Ensler's The Vagina Monologues. In November of that same year, she appeared as Emily Webb in a one-night-only staged reading of Thornton Wilder's Our Town at All Saints' Episcopal Church in Beverly Hills. The production was staged by Bess Armstrong, who had played the mother of Danes's character on My So-Called Life.

In 2002, she returned to film, starring in Igby Goes Down. Later that year, she co-starred as Clarissa Vaughan's (played by Meryl Streep) daughter in the Oscar-nominated film The Hours. The following year, she was cast in Terminator 3: Rise of the Machines, followed by Stage Beauty in 2004. She earned critical acclaim in 2005 when she starred in Shopgirl and The Family Stone. In September 2005, Danes returned to New York's Performance Space 122, where she had performed as a child. She appeared in choreographer Tamar Rogoff's solo dance piece "Christina Olson: American Model", where she portrayed the subject of Andrew Wyeth's famous painting Christina's World. Olson suffered from muscular deterioration that left her weak and partially paralyzed. Danes was praised for her dance skills and acting in the project.

In January 2007, Danes performed in Performance Space 122's Edith and Jenny. Later in 2007, Danes made her Broadway theatre debut as Eliza Doolittle in the Roundabout Theatre Company revival of George Bernard Shaw's Pygmalion, directed by David Grindley at the American Airlines Theatre. Also in 2007, she appeared in the fantasy Stardust, which she described as a "classic model of romantic comedy". In 2007, she appeared in the drama film, Evening, and the thriller film, The Flock. She was also featured in the 2008 film, Me and Orson Welles.

=== 2010–2019: Homeland and acclaim ===
In 2010, Danes returned to television starring in the HBO production of Temple Grandin, a biopic about the autistic animal scientist. She won the Primetime Emmy Award for Outstanding Lead Actress in a Limited or Anthology Series or Movie, the Golden Globe Award for Best Actress – Miniseries or Television Film and the Screen Actors Guild Award for Outstanding Performance by a Female Actor in a Miniseries or Television Movie. The film was well received and Grandin herself praised Danes's performance.

From 2011 to 2020, Danes starred in the Showtime series Homeland, in which she played Carrie Mathison, an agent of the CIA who has bipolar disorder. She won two consecutive Golden Globe Awards for Best Actress – Television Series Drama and Primetime Emmy Awards for Outstanding Lead Actress in a Drama Series for her performance. In 2012, Time magazine named Danes one of the 100 most influential people in the world.

In January 2012, Harvard University's Hasty Pudding Theatricals named Danes their 2012 Woman of the Year. In 2012, Danes's audiobook recording of Margaret Atwood's The Handmaid's Tale was released at Audible.com. Her performance won the 2013 Audie Award for fiction. In 2013, she hosted the Nobel Peace Prize Concert in Oslo. In March 2016, Danes performed in Dry Powder by Sarah Burgess at The Public Theater, starring alongside John Krasinski, Hank Azaria and Sanjit De Silva. The play was directed by Thomas Kail.

=== 2020–present: Streaming projects ===
In 2022, Danes replaced Keira Knightley as Cora Seaborn in the Apple TV drama series The Essex Serpent, based on the 2016 novel by Sarah Perry. The same year, she starred in the FX on Hulu miniseries Fleishman Is in Trouble, and was nominated for a Primetime Emmy Award for Outstanding Supporting Actress in a Limited or Anthology Series or Movie.

In 2023, Danes starred in Steven Soderbergh's miniseries Full Circle on HBO Max. In 2025, she starred as author Aggie Wiggs in the Netflix psychological thriller The Beast in Me, opposite Matthew Rhys.

== Personal life ==
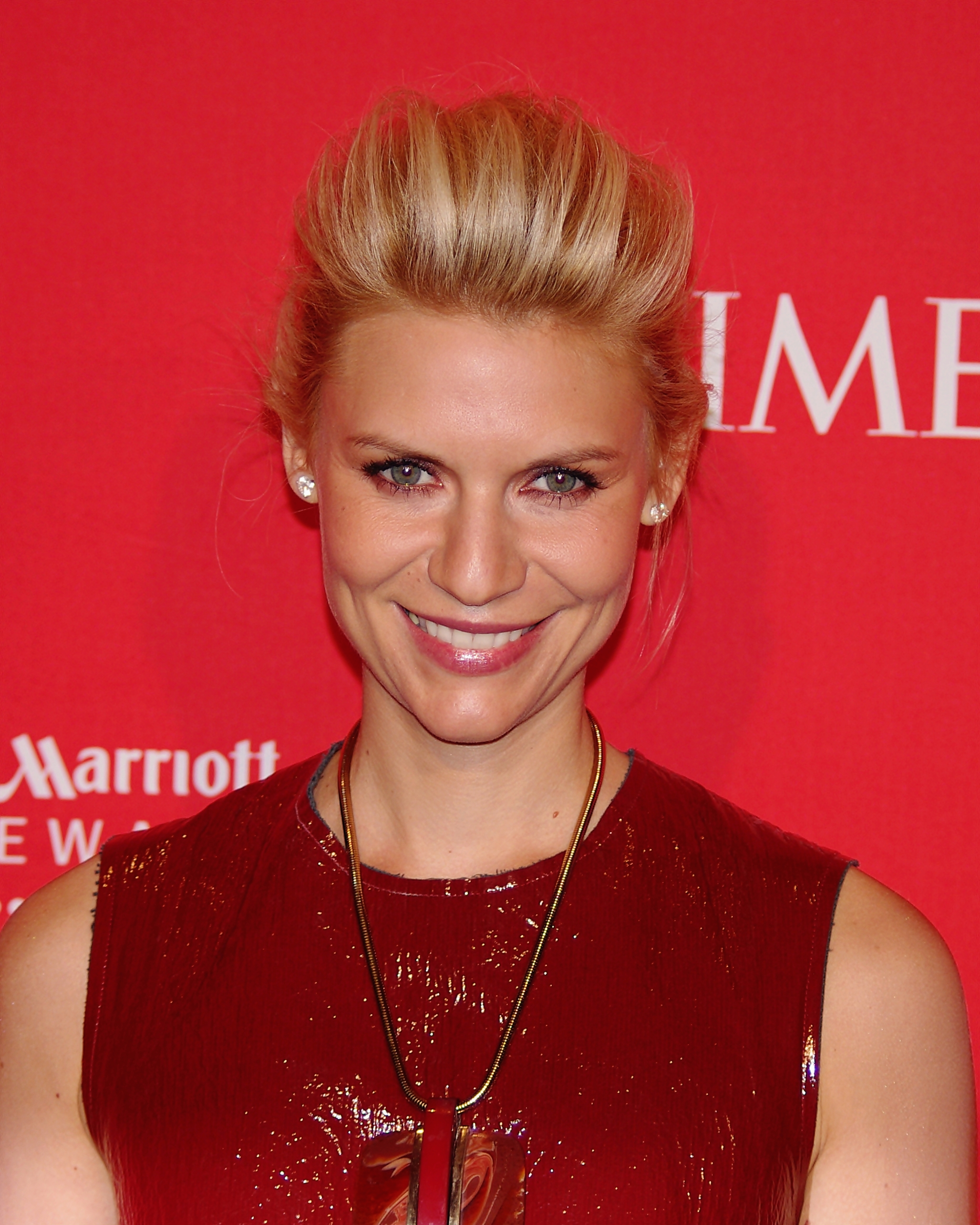
Danes at the 2012 Time 100

Danes has been in therapy since the age of six and considers it "a helpful tool and a luxury to self-reflect and get some insight".

In 1998, Danes was declared persona non grata by Filipino officials. Restrictions imposed on Danes involved a ban from entering Manila or the Philippines and a prohibition on distribution of her films in the region. (Note: Media outlets differed in reporting the entry ban to have prohibited Danes's entry to the city (Manila), or to the country (Philippines).) The ban came after Danes said Manila, the capital of the Philippines where she had filmed Brokedown Palace, "smelled of cockroaches, with rats all over, and that there is no sewerage system, and the people do not have anything – no arms, no legs, no eyes". Danes later apologized for her remarks, but the country refused to lift the ban.

Danes and her mother are supporters of the charity Afghan Hands, which helps women in Afghanistan gain independence, education, and livable wages. Danes is also a long time supporter of DonorsChoose, a website that allows public school teachers to create project requests.

Danes is a feminist and has been critical of female underrepresentation within Hollywood.

=== Relationships and family ===
Danes met singer Ben Lee at her eighteenth birthday party in 1997. They dated for six years before separating in 2003.

In 2003, Danes began dating actor Billy Crudup, with whom she starred in Stage Beauty. Their relationship attracted significant media attention, as it led to Crudup's break-up with actress Mary-Louise Parker, who was seven months pregnant with their son William at the time. Danes and Crudup's relationship lasted until 2006. Reflecting on their relationship, Danes had commented in 2015, "That was a scary thing. It was really hard. I didn't know how to not do that. I was just in love with him, and needed to explore that, and I was 24 ... I didn't quite know what those consequences would be. But it's OK. I went through it."

Danes met actor Hugh Dancy on the set of the film Evening in 2006. They announced their engagement in February 2009 and married in France later that year. They have three children: two sons and a daughter.

== Acting credits ==
=== Film ===
Year	Title	Role	Notes
1994	Little Women	Beth March	Film debut
1995	How to Make an American Quilt	Young Glady Jo Cleary	
1995	Home for the Holidays	Kitt Larson	
1996	I Love You, I Love You Not	Daisy / Young Nana	
1996	To Gillian on Her 37th Birthday	Rachel Lewis	
1996	Romeo + Juliet	Juliet Capulet	
1997	U Turn	Jenny	
1997	The Rainmaker	Kelly Riker	
1998	Les Misérables	Cosette	
1998	Polish Wedding	Hala	
1999	The Mod Squad	Julie Barnes	
1999	Brokedown Palace	Alice Marano	
1999	Princess Mononoke	San (voice)	English dub
2002	Igby Goes Down	Sookie Sapperstein	
2002	The Hours	Julia Vaughan	
2003	It's All About Love	Elena	
2003	The Rage in Placid Lake	Girl at Seminar	Cameo
2003	Terminator 3: Rise of the Machines	Kate Brewster	
2004	Stage Beauty	Maria / Margaret Hughes	
2005	Shopgirl	Mirabelle Buttersfield	
2005	The Family Stone	Julie Morton	
2007	Evening	Ann Grant	
2007	Stardust	Yvaine	
2007	The Flock	Allison Lowry	
2008	Me and Orson Welles	Sonja Jones	
2011	Ben Lee: Catch My Disease	Herself	Documentary film
2013	As Cool as I Am	Lainee Diamond	
2017	Brigsby Bear	Emily	
2018	A Kid Like Jake	Alex Wheeler	
2027	The Families Stone	Julie Morton	Filming

=== Television ===
Key
†	Denotes television productions that have not yet been released

Year	Title	Role	Notes
1992	Law & Order	Tracy Brandt	Episode: "Skin Deep"
1994	Lifestories: Families in Crisis	Katie Leiter	Episode: "More than Friends: The Coming Out of Heidi Leiter"
1994–1995	My So-Called Life	Angela Chase	Main role
1997	Saturday Night Live	Host	Episode: "Claire Danes/Mariah Carey"
2010	Temple Grandin	Temple Grandin	Television film
2011–2020	Homeland	Carrie Mathison	Main role; also executive producer (seasons 6–8)
2015	Master of None	Nina Stanton	Episode: "The Other Man"
2017	Portlandia	Joan	Episode: "The Storytellers"
2022	The Essex Serpent	Cora Seaborne	Miniseries; main role
2022	Fleishman Is in Trouble	Rachel Fleishman	Miniseries; main role
2023	Full Circle	Sam Browne	Miniseries; main role
2025	The American Revolution	Abigail Adams	Voice; docuseries
2025–present	The Beast in Me	Aggie Wiggs	Main role; also executive producer
2027	The Spot †	Lou Shadwick	Main role; upcoming series
TBA	Lovesick †	Annika	Main role; upcoming series; also executive producer

=== Theater ===
Year	Title	Role	Venue
2000	The Vagina Monologues	Performer	Westside Theatre
2005	Christina Olson: American Model	Christina Olson	Performance Space 122
2007	Edith and Jenny	Edith	Performance Space 122
2007	Pygmalion	Eliza Doolittle	American Airlines Theatre
2016	Dry Powder	Jenny	The Public Theater

== Awards and nominations ==
In 2015, Danes was awarded a star on the Hollywood Walk of Fame.

Award	Year	Category	Work	Result	Ref.
Actor Awards	2002	Outstanding Ensemble in a Motion Picture	The Hours	Nominated	
Actor Awards	2010	Outstanding Actress in a Television Movie or Miniseries	Temple Grandin	Won	
Actor Awards	2012	Outstanding Actress in a Drama Series	Homeland (season one)	Won	
Actor Awards	2012	Outstanding Ensemble in a Drama Series	Homeland (season one)	Nominated	
Actor Awards	2013	Outstanding Actress in a Drama Series	Homeland (season two)	Nominated	
Actor Awards	2013	Outstanding Ensemble in a Drama Series	Homeland (season two)	Nominated	
Actor Awards	2014	Outstanding Actress in a Drama Series	Homeland (season three)	Nominated	
Actor Awards	2014	Outstanding Ensemble in a Drama Series	Homeland (season three)	Nominated	
Actor Awards	2015	Outstanding Actress in a Drama Series	Homeland (season four)	Nominated	
Actor Awards	2015	Outstanding Ensemble in a Drama Series	Homeland (season four)	Nominated	
Actor Awards	2025	Outstanding Actress in a Miniseries or Television Movie	The Beast in Me	Nominated	
Critics' Choice Awards	2012	Best Actress – Television Drama Series	Homeland (season one)	Won	
Critics' Choice Awards	2013	Best Actress – Television Drama Series	Homeland (season two)	Nominated	
Critics' Choice Awards	2021	Best Actress – Television Drama Series	Homeland (season eight)	Nominated	
Critics' Choice Awards	2023	Best Supporting Actress in a Movie or Miniseries	Fleishman Is in Trouble	Nominated	
Emmy Awards (Primetime)	1995	Outstanding Lead Actress in a Drama Series	My So-Called Life (episode: "Pilot")	Nominated	
Emmy Awards (Primetime)	2010	Outstanding Lead Actress in a Miniseries or a Movie	Temple Grandin	Won	
Emmy Awards (Primetime)	2012	Outstanding Lead Actress in a Drama Series	Homeland (episode: "The Vest")	Won	
Emmy Awards (Primetime)	2013	Outstanding Lead Actress in a Drama Series	Homeland (episode: "Q&A")	Won	
Emmy Awards (Primetime)	2014	Outstanding Lead Actress in a Drama Series	Homeland (episode: "The Star")	Nominated	
Emmy Awards (Primetime)	2015	Outstanding Lead Actress in a Drama Series	Homeland (episode: "From A to B and Back Again")	Nominated	
Emmy Awards (Primetime)	2016	Outstanding Lead Actress in a Drama Series	Homeland (episode: "Super Powers")	Nominated	
Emmy Awards (Primetime)	2023	Outstanding Supporting Actress in a Limited Series or Movie	Fleishman Is in Trouble	Nominated	
Emmy Awards (Primetime)	2026	Outstanding Limited Series or Movie (as a producer)	The Beast in Me	Nominated	
Emmy Awards (Primetime)	2026	Outstanding Lead Actress in a Limited Series or Movie	The Beast in Me	Nominated	
Golden Globe Awards	1995	Best Actress – Television Series Drama	My So-Called Life	Won	
Golden Globe Awards	2011	Best Actress – Miniseries or Television Film	Temple Grandin	Won	
Golden Globe Awards	2012	Best Actress – Television Series Drama	Homeland (season one)	Won	
Golden Globe Awards	2013	Best Actress – Television Series Drama	Homeland (season one)	Won	
Golden Globe Awards	2015	Best Actress – Television Series Drama	Homeland (season four)	Nominated	
Golden Globe Awards	2022	Best Supporting Actress – Series, Miniseries or Television Film	Fleishman Is in Trouble	Nominated	
Golden Globe Awards	2025	Best Actress – Miniseries or Television Film	The Beast in Me	Nominated	
People's Choice Awards	2015	Favorite Premium Cable TV Actress	Homeland	Nominated	
People's Choice Awards	2016	Favorite Premium TV Series Actress	Homeland	Nominated	
Satellite Awards	2005	Best Actress – Motion Picture Comedy or Musical	Shopgirl	Nominated	
Satellite Awards	2011	Best Actress – Television Series Drama	Homeland	Won	
Satellite Awards	2012	Best Actress – Television Series Drama	Homeland	Won	
Satellite Awards	2015	Best Actress – Television Series Drama	Homeland	Won	
Satellite Awards	2025	Best Actress – Miniseries or Television Film	The Beast in Me	Nominated	
