= Full Circle (miniseries) =

2023 American TV crime series

- Genre: Drama
- Created by: Ed Solomon
- Written by: Ed Solomon
- Directed by: Steven Soderbergh
- Starring: Zazie Beetz; Claire Danes; Jim Gaffigan; Jharrel Jerome; Timothy Olyphant; CCH Pounder; Dennis Quaid; Jarod Lindsey
- Composer: Zack Ryan
- Country of origin: United States
- Original language: English
- No. of episodes: 6

Production
- Executive producers: Steven Soderbergh; Casey Silver; Ed Solomon
- Running time: 40-59 minutes
- Production companies: Extension 765; Casey Silver Productions

Original release
- Network: Max
- Release: July 13 – July 27, 2023

Full Circle is an American mystery drama miniseries created and written by Ed Solomon and directed by Steven Soderbergh for the Max streaming television service. It premiered July 13, 2023.

== Premise ==
An investigation into a botched kidnapping uncovers long-held secrets connecting multiple characters and cultures in present-day New York City.

== Cast ==
- Zazie Beetz as Mel Harmony
- Claire Danes as Sam Browne
- Timothy Olyphant as Derek Browne
- Dennis Quaid as Jeff McCusker
- Suzanne Savoy as Kristin McCusker
- Jharrel Jerome as Aked
- Gerald Jones as Louis
- Sheyi Cole as Xavier
- CCH Pounder as Savitri Mahabir
- Jim Gaffigan as Manny Broward
- Adia as Natalia
- Phaldut Sharma as Garmen Harry
- Lucian Zanes as Nicky
- William Sadler as Gene McCusker
- Happy Anderson as Joey
- Kareem Savinon as Paul Tranquada
- Franklin Ojeda Smith as Woulghby
- Ethan Stoddard as Jared
- Jay Vanderveer
- Jarod Lindsey as Len
- Rachel Annette Helson as Charisse
- Finn (golden retriever) as Ruby
- Danny Hoch as Ron Cuneo

== Episodes ==
No.	Title	Directed by	Written by	Original release date
1	"Something Different"	Steven Soderbergh	Ed Solomon	July 13, 2023
2	"Charger"	Steven Soderbergh	Ed Solomon	July 13, 2023
3	"Jared's Body"	Steven Soderbergh	Ed Solomon	July 20, 2023
4	"Safe in the Circle"	Steven Soderbergh	Ed Solomon	July 20, 2023
5	"Loyalty"	Steven Soderbergh	Ed Solomon	July 27, 2023
6	"Essequibo"	Steven Soderbergh	Ed Solomon	July 27, 2023

== Production ==
On June 17, 2021, it was reported that HBO Max was set to develop the series Full Circle with Ed Solomon writing and producing the series with Casey Silver and Steven Soderbergh, who would direct the 6-episode series. In September 2022, Zazie Beetz, Claire Danes, Timothy Olyphant, Dennis Quaid, Jharrel Jerome, Sheyi Cole, CCH Pounder, and Jim Gaffigan were cast. In October 2022, William Sadler, Happy Anderson, and Adia joined the cast.

The story for the series was inspired by the 1963 Akira Kurosawa film High and Low. Filming for the series began in September 2022 in New York City.

The series had its world premiere at the Tribeca Festival on June 11, 2023. Max released a trailer and poster on May 18, 2023, confirming that it would premiere on the platform on July 13, 2023, with two episodes released weekly until July 27.

== Reception ==
The review aggregator website Rotten Tomatoes reported a 78% approval rating with an average rating of 7.5/10, based on 45 critic reviews. The website's critics consensus reads, "Full Circle's windy plotting may prove too labyrinthine for casual enjoyment, but Steven Soderbergh's assured direction and a stacked cast give this simmering noir plenty of intrigue." Metacritic, which uses a weighted average, assigned a score of 70 out of 100 based on 23 critics, indicating "generally favourable reviews".
