= Reasonable Doubt (TV series) =

2022 American legal drama series

- Genre: Legal drama
- Created by: Raamla Mohamed
- Showrunner: Raamla Mohamed
- Starring: Emayatzy Corinealdi; McKinley Freeman; Tim Jo; Angela Grovey; Thaddeus J. Mixson; Aderinsola Olabode; Michael Ealy; Morris Chestnut; Joseph Sikora
- Composers: Adrian Younge; Ali Shaheed Muhammad
- Country of origin: United States
- Original language: English
- No. of seasons: 4
- No. of episodes: 38

Production
- Executive producers: Raamla Mohamed; Kerry Washington; Pilar Savone; Larry Wilmore; Shawn Holley; Anton Cropper
- Running time: 46–55 minutes
- Production companies: Good Home Training; Simpson Street; Wilmore Films; 20th Television (Note: Credited as ABC Signature for seasons 1–2); Onyx Collective

Original release
- Network: Hulu
- Release: September 27, 2022 – present

Reasonable Doubt is an American legal drama television series created by Raamla Mohamed for Hulu. The series stars Emayatzy Corinealdi as a corporate criminal defense lawyer navigating challenging high-profile cases. The series also stars McKinley Freeman, Tim Jo, Angela Grovey, Thaddeus J. Mixson, Aderinsola Olabode, and Michael Ealy. Reasonable Doubt is Onyx Collective's first scripted television series. It premiered on September 27, 2022. On April 17, 2023, it was renewed for a second season which premiered on August 22, 2024. The series generally received positive reviews from critics. In November 2024, the series was renewed for a third season which premiered on September 18, 2025. In November 2025, the series was renewed for a fourth season, which premiered on October 6, 2026. In November 2026, the series was renewed for a fifth season.

== Premise ==
Jax Stewart is a successful criminal defense lawyer at an upscale Los Angeles law firm. She navigates difficult cases amid a separation from her husband and the reappearance of a former client she worked with in her previous job as a public defender.

== Cast ==
=== Main ===
- Emayatzy Corinealdi as Jacqueline "Jax" Stewart (née Nicholas), a defense lawyer, and mother of two children currently separated from her husband, Lewis
- McKinley Freeman as Lewis Stewart, Jax's husband
- Tim Jo as Daniel Kim, Jax's investigator
- Angela Grovey as Krystal Walters
- Thaddeus J. Mixson as Spenser Stewart, Jax's teenage son
- Aderinsola Olabode as Naima Stewart, Jax's tween daughter
- Michael Ealy as Damon Cooke, a previous client of Jax's recently released from prison (season 1; guest star season 2)
- Morris Chestnut as Corey Cash, a talented defense attorney Jax brings in to assist on a case (season 2; recurring season 3-4)
- Joseph Sikora as Bill Sterling (season 3)
- Tank as Eric Cropper, a super-wealthy R&B artist and longtime client of Jax, Eric is charming, calculating, and accustomed to always getting his way at all costs. (Season 4)
- Meagan Good as Regina Harris, the new district attorney who is smart, compassionate, and nobody’s fool. (Season 4)

=== Recurring ===
- Sean Patrick Thomas as Brayden Miller, a billionaire and new client of Jax's (season 1)
- Pauletta Washington as Mama Lu, Jax's mother
- Christopher Cassarino as Rich Reed, a colleague of Jax's (season 1)
- Shannon Kane as Shanelle Tucker
- Perri Camper as Kaleesha Moore, a murder victim who accused Brayden Miller of sexual assault (season 1-4)
- Nefetari Spencer as Sally Braswell (season 1-4)
- Tiffany Yvonne Cox as Autumn Owens (season 1-4)
- Paul Fox as Theo James (season 1)
- Victor Rasuk as Mike Ortiz
- Brooke Lyons as Sarah Miller (season 1)
- Eugene Byrd as CJ Cooke, Damon's brother (season 1)
- Melissa Ponzio as Lucy Wargo (season 2)
- Vaughn W. Hebron as Adrian Hunter (season 2)
- Kandi Burruss as Eboni Phillips (season 2)
- Essence Atkins as Dr. Brandy Michaels (season 2-4)
- Kyle Bary as Ozzie (season 3)
- Rumer Willis as Wendy (season 3)
- Brandee Evans as Monica (season 3-4)
- Richard Brooks as Eddie Nicholas (season 3)
- April Parker Jones as Rosie (season 3-4)
- Keith Arthur Bolden as Sal (season 3)
- Kiah Clingman as Kristin (season 3)
- Brittany Inge as Kendra (season 3)
- Lori Harvey as Chelsea (season 3)
- Kash Doll as Nisha (season 3)

== Episodes ==
=== Series overview ===
Season	Episodes	Originally released	
Season	Episodes	First released	Last released
1	9	September 27, 2022	November 15, 2022
2	10	August 22, 2024	October 17, 2024
3	10	September 18, 2025	November 13, 2025
4	10	October 6, 2026	November 24, 2026

=== Season 1 (2022) ===
No. overall	No. in season	Title	Directed by	Written by	Original release date
1	1	"Can't Knock the Hustle"	Kerry Washington	Raamla Mohamed	September 27, 2022
2	2	"Family Feud"	Pete Chatmon	Resheida Brady	September 27, 2022
3	3	"99 Problems"	Neema Barnette	Ryan Richmond & Loy A. Webb	October 4, 2022
4	4	"Guilty Until Proven Innocent"	Darren Grant	Tash Gray	October 11, 2022
5	5	"So Ambitious"	Sylvain White	Michelle Flowers & Jason Wilborn	October 18, 2022
6	6	"Renegade"	Julie Dash	Loy A. Webb	October 25, 2022
7	7	"N**** What, N**** Who"	Carl Seaton	Jason Wilborn	November 1, 2022
8	8	"Song Cry"	Numa Perrier	Resheida Brady & Raamla Mohamed & Michelle Flowers & Natalia Temesgen	November 8, 2022
9	9	"Already Home"	Pete Chatmon	Tash Gray & Ryan Richmond	November 15, 2022

=== Season 2 (2024) ===
No. overall	No. in season	Title	Directed by	Written by	Original release date
10	1	"Can I Live?"	Anton Cropper	Raamla Mohamed	August 22, 2024
11	2	"Say Hello"	Pete Chatmon	Tash Gray	August 22, 2024
12	3	"Part II (On the Run)"	Crystle Roberson Dorsey	Michelle Flowers	August 29, 2024
13	4	"Primetime"	Julie Dash	Zahir McGhee	September 5, 2024
14	5	"Real As It Gets"	Mo Marable	Loy A. Webb	September 12, 2024
15	6	"This Can't Be Life"	Rob Hardy	Natalia Temesgen	September 19, 2024
16	7	"Venus vs. Mars"	Anton Cropper	Ryan Richmond	September 26, 2024
17	8	"Change the Game"	Numa Perrier	Anil K. Foreman	October 3, 2024
18	9	"Who You Wit"	Geary McLeod	Resheida Brady	October 10, 2024
19	10	"Encore"	Anton Cropper	Raamla Mohamed & Dallas Rico	October 17, 2024

=== Season 3 (2025) ===
No. overall	No. in season	Title	Directed by	Written by	Original release date
20	1	"Feelin' It"	Anton Cropper	Raamla Mohamed & Jordan Crawford	September 18, 2025
21	2	"A Million and One Questions"	Pete Chatmon	Michelle Flowers	September 18, 2025
22	3	"Run this Town"	Jade Holmes Christian	Ryan Richmond	September 25, 2025
23	4	"Friend or Foe"	Anton Cropper	Christopher Sanford	October 2, 2025
24	5	"Threat"	Amy Aniobi	Loy A. Webb	October 9, 2025
25	6	"No Church in the Wild"	Terri J. Vaughn	Tyger Williams	October 16, 2025
26	7	"Lost One"	Anton Cropper	Raamla Mohamed	October 23, 2025
27	8	"Ignorant Sh*t"	Carl Seaton	Anil K. Foreman	October 30, 2025
28	9	"D'Evils"	Nijla Mu'min	Zahir McGhee	November 6, 2025
29	10	"On to the Next One"	Anton Cropper	Erika Harrison	November 13, 2025

=== Season 4 (2026) ===
No. overall	No. in season	Title	Directed by	Written by	Original release date
30	1	"Dead or Alive"	Anton Cropper	Raamla Mohamed Hunter & Morgan A. Grain	October 6, 2026
31	2	"Excuse Me Miss"	Terri J. Vaughn	Zahir McGhee	October 6, 2026
32	3	"Ain't No Love (In the Heart of the City)"	Cierra "Shooter" Glaude	Ryan Richmond	October 6, 2026
33	4	"Imaginary Players"	Anton Cropper	Michelle Flowers	October 13, 2026
34	5	"Who Gon Stop Me"	Stacey Muhammad	Anil K. Foreman	October 20, 2026
35	6	"Show Me What You Got"	Ryan Richmond	Tyger Williams	October 27, 2026
36	7	"Soon You'll Understand"	Anton Cropper	Raamla Mohamed Hunter	November 3, 2026
37	8	"Face Off"	Jade Holmes Christian	Loy A. Webb	November 10, 2026
38	9	"I Did It My Way"	Amy Aniobi	Jordan Crawford	November 17, 2026
39	10	"Moment of Clarity"	TBA	Erika L. Johnson	November 24, 2026

== Production ==
The series was created by former Scandal writer Raamla Mohamed. It is loosely based on the experiences of celebrity attorney Shawn Holley, who is also a producer for the show. Reasonable Doubt was produced through the Walt Disney Television's Onyx Collective. Kerry Washington directed the series pilot. On April 17, 2023, it was announced that the series was renewed for a second season. Morris Chestnut joined the cast as a series regular for season 2.

On November 13, 2024, the series was renewed for a third season. On November 6, 2025, the series was renewed for a fourth season. On November 16, 2026, the series was renewed for a fifth season.

== Release ==
The show premiered on September 27, 2022, on Hulu. The first season has nine episodes. The first episode aired on ABC on November 10, 2022. Internationally, the series is available on Disney+. The second season was released on August 22, 2024, with two episodes and ten in total. The third season premiered on September 18, 2025, with two new episodes. There were ten episodes in total.

The fourth season premiered on October 6, 2026, with three episodes and the rest set to debut on a weekly basis.

== Reception ==
=== Viewership ===
Reasonable Doubt had its pilot episode aired as a special on ABC on November 10, 2022. The episode attracted 1.8 million viewers and scored a 0.2 rating in the 18–49 demographic. TVision, which utilizes its TVision Power Score to evaluate CTV programming performance by factoring in viewership and engagement across over 1,000 apps and incorporating four key metrics—viewer attention time, total program time available for the season, program reach, and app reach—calculated that Reasonable Doubt was the fourth most-streamed series from August 19—25, 2024. Luminate, which measures streaming performance by analyzing viewership data, audience engagement metrics, and content reach across various platforms, calculated that it was the tenth most-streamed streaming original series during the week of August 23–29, 2024, with 190.7 million minutes of watch time. TVision later announced that Reasonable Doubt was the twentieth most-streamed show during the week of September 23—29, 2024. Reasonable Doubt ranked No. 4 on Hulu's "Top 15 Today" list—a daily updated list of the platform's most-watched titles—on October 4, 2024.

=== Critical response ===
The review aggregator website Rotten Tomatoes reported a 100% approval rating with an average rating of 7.80/10 based on 9 critics' reviews for season one. Metacritic assigned the series a weighted average score of 76 out of 100 based on 5 reviews, indicating "generally favorable reviews".

Daniel D'Addario of Variety asserted, "Reasonable Doubt plays like the juicy soap Shonda Rhimes would never write; its excesses, often, grab and hold our attention." Angie Han of The Hollywood Reporter praised Emayatzy Corinealdi's performance, saying, "Corinealdi is lots of fun to watch as Jax, and she's blessed with scripts that allow her to embody multitudes," and wrote, "Reasonable Doubt serves up plenty of the juicy thrills and emotional dilemmas that wine-soaked group chats were made for." Nina Metz of Chicago Tribune gave the series a grade of 3 out of 4 stars and said, "There's a lot to like about "Reasonable Doubt," which is sharp and fun and moves at a good clip. And it's smart about keeping things just this side of ridiculous." Kristen Baldwin of Entertainment Weekly gave the show a B+, stating, "Reasonable Doubt is enjoyably Shonda-esque, in that it's a steamy, speed-plotted soap built around a morally ambiguous female power player whose life is filled with ridiculously attractive men. But Mohamed also weaves in frank and nuanced stories about marriage, parenting, and the importance of (and challenges with) female friendships," and complimented Corinealdi's performance.

=== Accolades ===
Kerry Washington won Outstanding Directing in a Drama Series at the 2024 Black Reel Awards for Television.

== Awards and nominations ==
Year	Award	Category	Nominee(s)	Result	Ref.
Black Reel Awards	2024	Outstanding Directing in a Drama Series	Kerry Washington	Won	
Black Reel Awards	2025	Outstanding Drama Series	Reasonable Doubt	Nominated	
Black Reel Awards	2025	Outstanding Lead Performance in a Drama Series	Emayatzy Corinealdi	Nominated	
Celebration of Latino Cinema and Television	2024	Actress Award for Series	Emayatzy Corinealdi	Won	
Gracie Allen Awards	2025	Actress in a Supporting Role – Drama	Shannon Kane	Won	
NAACP Image Awards	2025	Outstanding Drama Series	Reasonable Doubt	Nominated	
NAACP Image Awards	2025	Outstanding Actress in a Drama Series	Emayatzy Corinealdi	Nominated	
NAACP Image Awards	2025	Outstanding Supporting Actor in a Drama Series	Morris Chestnut	Nominated	
NAACP Image Awards	2025	Outstanding Soundtrack/Compilation Album	Reasonable Doubt (Season 2) (Original Soundtrack) (Hollywood Records)	Nominated	
NAACP Image Awards	2025	Outstanding Drama Series	Reasonable Doubt	Won	
NAACP Image Awards	2025	Outstanding Actress in a Drama Series	Emayatzy Corinealdi	Nominated	
NAACP Image Awards	2025	Outstanding Guest Performance	Brandee Evans	Nominated	
NAACP Image Awards	2025	Outstanding Guest Performance	Morris Chestnut	Nominated	
NAACP Image Awards	2025	Outstanding Directing in a Drama Series	Anton Cropper	Nominated	
NAACP Image Awards	2025	Outstanding Hairstyling	Deaundra Metzger	Won	
