= Vinny Chhibber =

American actor and producer

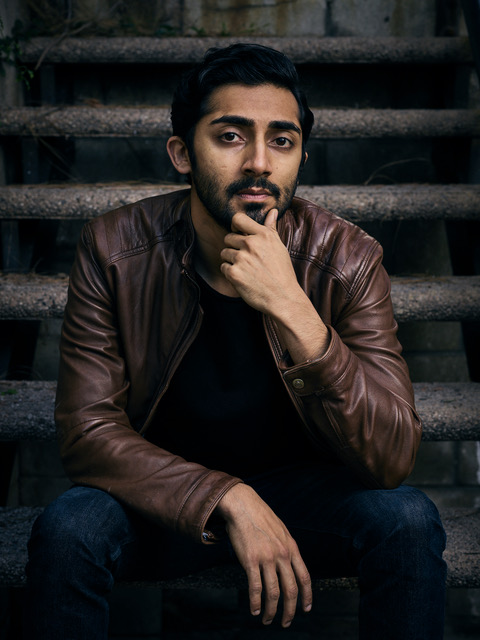
- Education: Emory University; Stella Adler Studio of Acting
- Occupations: Actor; producer
- Years active: 2008–present
- Organization: The Salon

Vinny Chhibber is an American actor and producer. He is known for portraying Liam Bhatt in the CBS limited series The Red Line and Jag Bhullar in the second season of ABC's Big Sky. He is also a co-founder of The Salon, a networking and mentorship initiative for South Asian professionals in film and television.

== Career ==
=== Acting ===
Raised in Point Pleasant, West Virginia, Chhibber graduated from Emory University and trained at the Stella Adler Studio of Acting in New York City before moving to Los Angeles in 2007.

Ahead of the 2018 pilot season, Vanity Fair identified Chhibber as part of a broader increase in South Asian representation on American television.

His early screen work included appearances on Brothers & Sisters, Chuck, Rules of Engagement, Dollhouse, No Tomorrow, Taken, and Here and Now.

In 2019, Chhibber played Liam Bhatt, a series regular in The Red Line, an eight-episode CBS limited series starring Noah Wyle and executive produced by Ava DuVernay and Greg Berlanti. Coverage of the series described Liam as a gay, Muslim, Indian-American teacher. Reviews identified Liam as a notable part of the ensemble.

Later that year, he had a recurring role in the fourth season of TNT's Animal Kingdom and appeared in episodes of CBS's God Friended Me.

In 2021, Chhibber played Jag Bhullar in the second season of Big Sky.

His later screen credits included the films Cover Versions, Marriage Story, 7 Days, and 88, as well as the television series For All Mankind. In 2025, he was cast as Ravi Charan, a series regular in the Hulu pilot Foster Dade, starring opposite Matt Bomer.

=== Producing and organizations ===
Chhibber co-founded Chhibber Mann Productions with Mike C. Manning. Through the company, he worked as an executive producer on Folk Hero & Funny Guy and the documentary Lost in America, and as a co-producer on M.F.A.. The same year, he also co-founded Ammunition Theatre Company with Arjun Gupta.

In 2019, Chhibber co-founded The Salon with Nik Dodani and literary manager Bash Naran. In 2020, the group launched a mentorship program in partnership with 20th Television and Hillman Grad Productions. Additional cohorts followed in 2021 and 2022, and in 2024 the initiative expanded with the launch of the Desi List in partnership with The Black List.

== Filmography ==
=== Film ===
Year	Title	Role/credit	Notes
2016	Folk Hero & Funny Guy	Executive producer	
2017	M.F.A.	Co-producer	
2018	Cover Versions	Chauncey	
2019	Marriage Story	Visual Effects Guy	
2020	Lost in America	Executive producer	Documentary
2021	7 Days	Vinny	
2022	88	Ali	

=== Television ===
Year	Title	Role	Notes
2008	Brothers & Sisters	Waiter	Guest appearance
2008	Chuck	Meathead #2	Guest appearance
2009	Dollhouse	—	Guest appearance
2010	Rules of Engagement	Indian Volunteer	Guest appearance
2016–2017	No Tomorrow	Rohan	Recurring role
2018	Here and Now	—	Guest appearance
2018	Taken	Vikram Desai	Guest appearance
2019	The Red Line	Liam Bhatt	Series regular
2019	Animal Kingdom	Rahul	Recurring role
2019–2020	God Friended Me	Sameer Patel	Guest appearances
2021	Big Sky	Jag Bhullar	Recurring role
2023	For All Mankind	Ravi Vaswani	Season 4
2025	Foster Dade	Ravi Charan	Hulu pilot; series regular
