= Whitstable Pearl =

British crime drama television series

- Genre: Crime drama; Mystery fiction
- Based on: The Whitstable Pearl Mystery and Disappearance at Oare by Julie Wassmer
- Developed by: Øystein Karlsen
- Starring: Kerry Godliman; Howard Charles; Frances Barber
- Composer: Carly Paradis
- Country of origin: United Kingdom
- Original language: English
- No. of series: 3
- No. of episodes: 18

Production
- Executive producers: Øystein Karlsen; Julie Wassmer; Catherine Mackin; Bea Tammer; Anna Burns; Nadia Jaynes; Richard Tulk-Hart; Tony Wood
- Producers: Guy Hescott; Brett Wilson
- Running time: 46–49 minutes
- Production companies: Buccaneer Media; Acorn Media Enterprises

Original release
- Network: Acorn TV (streaming); U&Drama (streaming and linear)
- Release: 24 May 2021 – present

Whitstable Pearl is a British crime drama television series broadcast and produced by Acorn TV, based on the Whitstable Pearl novels by Julie Wassmer. It stars Kerry Godliman as Pearl Nolan, who, as well as being a private detective, runs a restaurant.

Three series of Whitstable Pearl have been broadcast to date.

== Synopsis ==
Pearl Nolan, single mother of a grown son, and an ex-police officer, is a private detective who, together with her mum, runs the Whitstable Pearl, a seafood restaurant in the coastal town of Whitstable. When a friend dies under suspicious circumstances, Pearl finds herself in conflict with the gruff new cop in town, DCI Mike McGuire.

== Cast and characters ==
Main

- Kerry Godliman as Pearl Nolan, a single mum who runs the Whitstable Pearl
- Howard Charles as DCI Mike McGuire, a dour police detective who moves to Whitstable from London
- Frances Barber as Dolly Nolan, Pearl's widowed mother and co-manager of the Whitstable Pearl

Recurring

- Sophia Del Pizzo as DS Nikki Martel, Mike's partner
- Isobelle Molloy as Ruby Williams, a waitress at the Whitstable Pearl
- Rohan Nedd as Charlie Nolan, Pearl's son
- Robert Webb as Tom Grant, Pearl's boyfriend, a local schoolteacher (series 2–3)
- Emily Head as Kat Bergman, Mike's girlfriend (series 2)

== Production ==
The first season of Whitstable Pearl was filmed in Kent from October 2020 to January 2021. The majority of the filming took place in Whitstable, including at the harbour, the yacht club, and the beach. Various scenes were also shot in Margate, the Port of Ramsgate, Dover, and Hernhill.

Acorn renewed the show for a second, and then a third series, the latter of which began production in March 2024.

== Episodes ==
Series	Episodes	Originally released	
Series	Episodes	First released	Last released
1	6	24 May 2021	21 June 2021
2	6	28 November 2022	12 December 2022
3	6	21 October 2024	25 November 2024

=== Series 1 (2021) ===
No. overall	No. in season	Title	Directed by	Written by	Original release date
1	1	"The Free Waters"	David Caffrey	Øystein Karlsen	24 May 2021
Restaurateur and detective Pearl Nolan sets out to sea to look for her friend, fisherman Vinnie Rowe, only to find him drowned on his own boat. She heads the boat back to shore and is questioned by DCI Mike McGuire. Nolan later learns from Vinnie's partner, Connie, that he was in debt to a man named Stroud. She is visited by Vinnie's ex-wife, Tina, who mentions that Stroud could be capable of murder. Stroud's dead body is found in his hotel bathroom, again by Nolan. Tina later goes missing. At the pier, Nolan discovers that Max Azarov's jet ski has scrape marks on it, and she suspects him of killing Vinnie. She confronts Ruby Williams, Max's girlfriend, who reveals that he was involved with drugs. Max arrives and attempts to drown Nolan but is knocked down by his father just as the police arrive. Max and his father are arrested for murdering Vinnie and Stroud, respectively.
2	2	"Random Acts"	David Caffrey	Alastair Galbraith	24 May 2021
Property developer Marcus Devlin is mysteriously found bound, gagged, and unconscious in a house, and the police investigate. McGuire struggles to find any relevant evidence. He and Nolan learn that a rival property developer, Joseph Conroy's daughter, Emily Hurst, had a relationship with Devlin, but they can't find a motive. Nolan investigates minor cases, one notably involving misplaced garbage cans, which are later connected to McGuire's case. With Nolan, McGuire learns that the crime is actually related to counterfeit paintings being used to replace authentic ones. Kane Bishop and his art dealer boyfriend, Dimitri, become prime suspects. Nolan and McGuire manage to stop the duo from escaping in the nick of time. McGuire asks Nolan out on a date.
3	3	"Civil War"	Jon Jones	Mike Walden	31 May 2021
Recently retired police officer Brian Armstrong is shot by a sniper at a civil war reenactment. The police discover that he allegedly cheated on his wife, Heidi, with at least three other women, thereby putting suspicion on her. Heidi reassures Nolan that she wasn't responsible for her husband's death. Someone attempts to break into Armstrong's house. Nolan discovers that Heidi had an affair with Brian's brother, Kid. McGuire finds Kid unconscious in his own backyard. The suspect, disguised as a doctor, tries to kill Kid, but is hindered by Heidi before the police arrive to arrest him.
4	4	"Disappearance at Oare"	Jon Jones	MyAnna Buring	7 June 2021
Pearl Nolan investigates the disappearance of Robert Scott after his widow, Christina, receives a letter saying he is alive. When questioning people involved, including Scott's parents and the church minister, she faces people who see Scott as someone who betrayed them. Nolan is startled to find Scott's girlfriend, Alice, who is back in town to confront Scott's father. After confessing to killing Scott, he tries to attack Alice but is knocked out by his wife. Nolan invites McGuire to a Christmas celebration at her restaurant.
5	5	"A Cup O' Kindness"	Chanya Button	Mike Walden and Rachel Flowerday	14 June 2021
Lynsey Mills takes her daughter Chloe out on a boat trip after she feels ill, as advised by her mother, Rosie. After her husband, Jamie, finds out, Chloe calls him and informs him that their boat has sunk, and the coast guard is called. A confrontation happens back on land between Jamie and one of the rescuers. Rosie suspects that the boat was tampered with and has Nolan investigate. A boat at the Mills' sailing club is sabotaged. Nolan sneaks out to observe the club at night, discovering Chloe to be the culprit, and convinces her to not repeat another offence. After having eaten a bite of Chloe's sandwich earlier, Nolan throws up and realises that Rosie poisoned it. She rushes to her house, where Rosie and the Mills are having dinner. Nolan deduces that Rosie couldn't let Lynsey go when she grew older, and did the same to Chloe. At the New Year's party, McGuire and Nolan share a kiss.
6	6	"The Man on the Blue Plaque"	Chanya Button	Mike Walden	21 June 2021
The discovery of a skull leads to the reemergence of an old mystery personally close to Nolan, as the skull is identified as that of her father, Flash. Her relationship with McGuire is strained as he conducts the investigation, notably putting her mother under suspicion. Having eventually grown tired of secrets, Nolan decides to uncover the truth as well. McGuire and Martell follow Dolly to a beach hut, where Nolan later discovers letters written by her father. McGuire meets her and tells her about a police report revealing that her father had beaten Dolly. He reads her father's letter, which is revealed to be a suicide note. They later reconcile, but Nolan asks for extra time to get over the recent discovery.

=== Series 2 (2022) ===
No. overall	No. in season	Title	Directed by	Written by	Original release date
7	1	"Babylon"	Jon Jones	Mike Walden	28 November 2022
While returning from visiting his young son, Kruz, in France, Whitstable local and former soldier Dan Tomlin crashes his car. When he wakes in the hospital, Dan learns that Kruz had been hiding in the trunk of his vehicle—and he's now gone missing. With his ex-wife accusing him of kidnapping their son, Dan hires Pearl to track him down, and she teams up with Mike to find the missing boy.
8	2	"Night Terrors"	Jon Jones	Mike Walden	28 November 2022
Laid up at home with a broken ankle, Mike passes time by observing his neighbours in the complex across the way. After witnessing one man's violent night terrors, Mike becomes convinced that his supposed episodes are part of a plot to murder his wife. When Mike's police colleagues dismiss his concerns, he hires Pearl to do the legwork he can't.
9	3	"The Offer"	Jon Jones	Jess Williams	5 December 2022
The heir to a much-loved community pub hires Pearl to find out who's been leaving her threatening notes—and a dead seagull—after she hired local estate agent Fosters to sell her just-inherited pub to the highest bidder, instead of to a local organization, as her late mother had promised. When the winning bidder, developer Elliot Lloyd, turns up dead, Pearl sets out to find out who is behind the hate campaign—and the murder.
10	4	"The Gumshoe and the Femme Fatale"	Matt Carter	Mike Walden	5 December 2022
Pearl is trying to figure out why Natalia, the housekeeper to a reclusive movie star, would attack her employer and then run away after the ageing actress bequeathed the bulk of her estate to Natalia in her new will. It doesn't make sense, especially after Natalia had told Pearl about the will and her fears for both herself and the actress before the attack.
11	5	"Hidden Treasures"	Matt Carter	Mike Walden	12 December 2022
It isn't lost on Nikki that Pearl isn't at the crime scene when she and Mike are called to a local shop to investigate a robbery. Meanwhile, Pearl has a different puzzle to solve: strange things have been happening at Dolly's house, so either Dolly is starting to exhibit signs of dementia or someone uninvited has been making themselves at home in her home—on more than one occasion.
12	6	"To Those We Love"	Matt Carter	Kam Odedra	12 December 2022
Pearl and Ruby are taking a break from serving oysters during a wedding celebration when they discover a dead body. Things don't look good for Pearl when a crime scene tech finds the murder weapon: one of her oyster-shucking knives. Pearl disregards Mike's advice not to get involved and gets hired by one of the suspects to find a mysterious person that no one seems to know.

=== Series 3 (2024) ===
No. overall	No. in season	Title	Directed by	Written by	Original release date
13	1	"Girl, Whitstable Beach"	David Sant	Sarah-Louise Hawkins	21 October 2024
A photographer on Whitstable beach captures images of a woman who hasn't been seen or heard from in seven years, shortly before she is mugged. The camera contains the only evidence, and it's up to Pearl to help solve the case. Meanwhile, Mike returns from his sabbatical, and Pearl questions if he has found inner peace.
14	2	"Death, the Devil and the Fool"	Steve Brett	Ciara Conway	28 October 2024
The disappearance of a seven-year-old girl at the Whitstable psychic fair leads to a town-wide search and leads Pearl to team up with a disgraced psychic, Cassie Gilmartin. CCTV images suggest the girl went off with someone she knew. Tom begins to question his future with Pearl and decides to make a bold move.
15	3	"Oysters Kilpatrick"	David Sant	Mike Walden	4 November 2024
A world-renowned food critic comes to Whitstable to try out the local restaurants, but whilst at the Pearl, collapses and dies from suspected poisoning. Pearl is away, having been whisked to the Lake District by Tom for their anniversary, leaving Dolly to assume the role of detective, as the whole of Whitstable's hospitality industry comes under the spotlight.
16	4	"Prisoners of the Past"	David Sant	Joe Ainsworth	11 November 2024
17	5	"Walking with Ghosts"	Steve Brett	Kit Lambert	18 November 2024
18	6	"Someone Like Me"	Steve Brett	Mike Walden	25 November 2024
