= Folk Hero & Funny Guy =

- Theatrical release poster
- Directed by: Jeff Grace
- Written by: Jeff Grace
- Produced by: Ryland Aldrich; Jeff Grace
- Starring: Alex Karpovsky; Wyatt Russell; Meredith Hagner; Michael Ian Black; Hannah Simone; Heather Morris; Melanie Lynskey; David Cross
- Cinematography: Nancy Schreiber
- Edited by: Jonathan Melin
- Music by: Adam Ezra
- Production companies: Spitfire Studios; Chhibber Mann Productions
- Distributed by: Gravitas Ventures
- Release dates: April 16, 2016 (Tribeca Film Festival); May 12, 2017 (United States)
- Running time: 88 minutes
- Country: United States
- Language: English

Folk Hero & Funny Guy is a 2016 American comedy film written, directed, and produced by Jeff Grace, in his directorial debut. It stars Alex Karpovsky, Wyatt Russell, Meredith Hagner, Michael Ian Black, Hannah Simone, Heather Morris, Melanie Lynskey, and David Cross.

The film had its world premiere at the Tribeca Film Festival on April 16, 2016. It was released in a limited release and through video on demand on May 12, 2017, by Gravitas Ventures.

== Plot ==
A successful singer-songwriter plans to help his friend with his struggling comedy career by hiring him as his opening act on his solo tour.

== Cast ==
- Alex Karpovsky as Paul
- Wyatt Russell as Jason
- Meredith Hagner as Bryn
- Michael Ian Black as Randy
- Hannah Simone as Emily
- Heather Morris as Nicole
- Melanie Lynskey as Becky
- David Cross as Chris DeRose
- Sarah Arnold as Kelly
- Alex McKenna as Stacy
- Rachel Staman as Sky
- Thida Penn as Belina
- Jessica Megan Rivera as Anasctacia
- Todd Berger as Johnny
- Blaise Miller as Doug
- Kevin M. Brennan as Robbie Nelson
- Mike C. Manning as Cardie
- Vinny Chhibber as Fielder Hiss

== Production ==
In November 2013, a Kickstarter campaign was unveiled to raise funds for the film, with a $50,000 goal being reached. It was also confirmed Jeff Grace would direct the film, from a screenplay he wrote, with Alex Karpovsky, Liza Oppenheimer, starring in the film, while Adam Ezra would be composing the film, as well as composing original songs. In June 2014, it was revealed that Wyatt Russell and Melanie Lynskey joined the cast of the film, with Ryland Aldrich producing alongside Grace. In January 2015, Heather Morris and Meredith Hagner joined the cast of the film.

== Release ==
The film had its world premiere at the Tribeca Film Festival on April 16, 2016. Shortly after, Gravitas Ventures acquired distribution rights to the film and set it for a limited release and through video on demand on May 12, 2017.

== Reception ==
Folk Hero & Funny Guy received positive reviews from film critics. As of August 2020, 77% of the 22 critical reviews compiled on review aggregator website Rotten Tomatoes are positive, with an average rating of 6.14/10.

Kate Walsh of Indiewire.com gave the film a B writing : "“Folk Hero & Funny Guy” is an amiable road movie powered by great music. But it’s much more than just that, with deeply felt, lived in emotions capturing the ups and downs of longterm friendships, the nervous spark of a new attraction, and the power of making amends. It’s a fine showcase for the ranges of Russell and Karpovsky, as well as the winsome Hagner, and signals Grace as a filmmaker to watch."
