= Emayatzy Corinealdi =

American actress (born 1980)

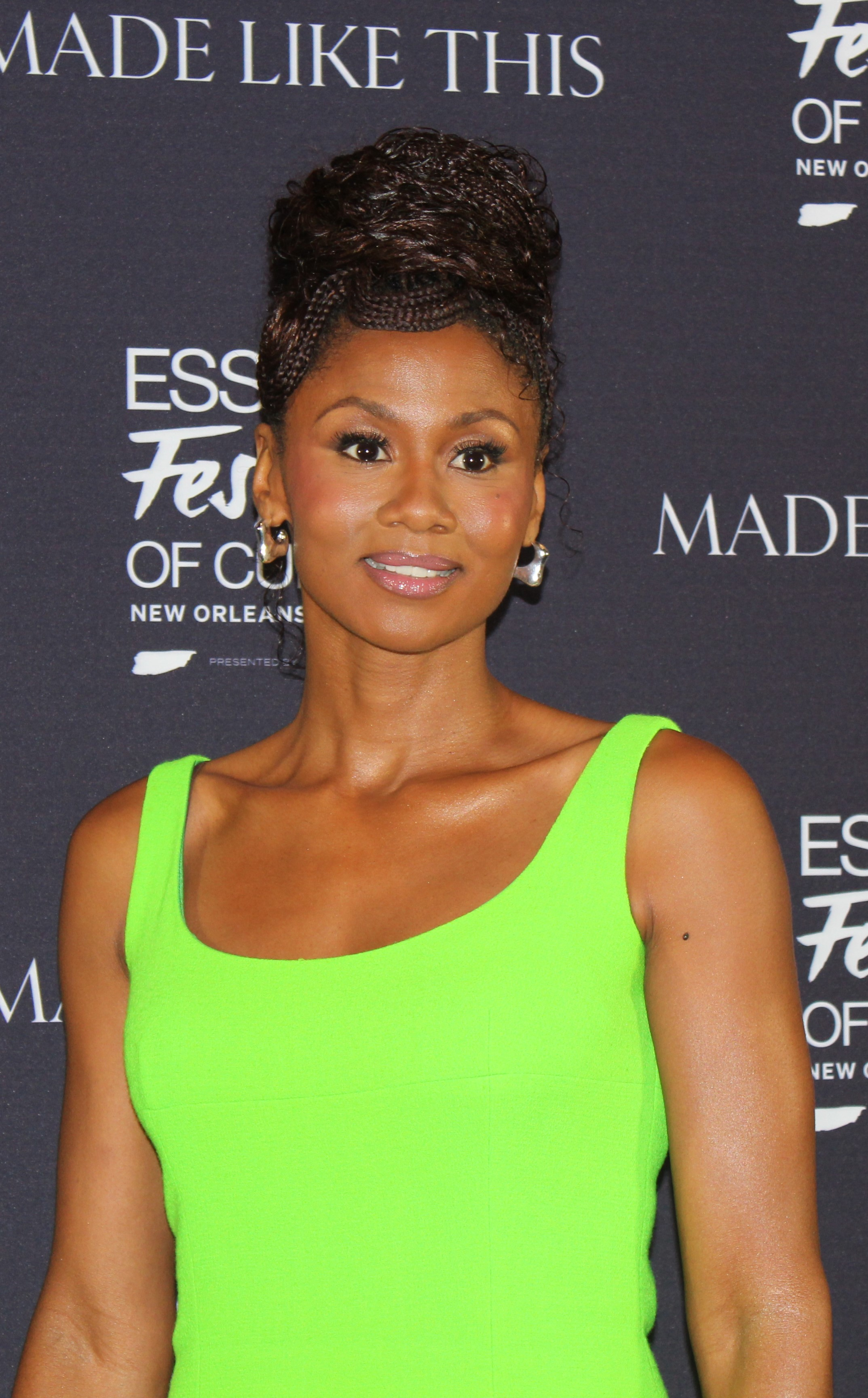
- Corinealdi on the 2025 Essence Carpet
- Born: January 14, 1980 (age 46); Fort Knox, Kentucky, U.S.
- Occupation: Actress
- Years active: 2000–present

Emayatzy Corinealdi (/ˌɛmeɪˈɑːtsi ˌkɒrɪˈnɑːldi/ EM-ay-AHT-see KORR-ih-NAHL-dee; born January 14, 1980) is an American actress. She starred in the Ava DuVernay 2012 drama film Middle of Nowhere, for which she won the Gotham Independent Film Award for Breakthrough Performer and received an Independent Spirit Award for Best Female Lead nomination. Corinealdi later starred in the films Miles Ahead (2016) and The Invitation (2015). On television, she played the role of Belle in the 2016 remake of Roots. She also starred in Hand of God (2014–2017), Ballers (2017–2019), and The Red Line (2019). In 2022, Corinealdi began starring in the Hulu legal drama series, Reasonable Doubt.

== Early life ==
Corinealdi was born January 14, 1980, in Fort Knox, Kentucky, the daughter of Rosemarie Hilton and Edward Corinealdi. Her father is Panamanian, while her mother is African-American and from Ohio. As a member of a military family, she was raised between Germany and the U.S. states in Ohio, Kansas, and New Jersey. She studied in New Jersey at the Actor's Training Studio, then at the William Esper Studio in New York City, and then at Playhouse West.

== Career ==
In her early career, Corinealdi co-starred in a number of independent and short films, had the recurring role on the CBS daytime soap opera, The Young and the Restless, and appeared in the Hallmark television film, The Nanny Express (2008). In 2012, she made her feature film debut as the lead in the drama, Middle of Nowhere. Corinealdi won the 14th Annual American Black Film Festival Star Project, an international acting competition for emerging multicultural artists. Later that year, she won the Gotham Independent Film Award for Breakthrough Actor for the film. She was also nominated for an Independent Spirit Award for best female lead.

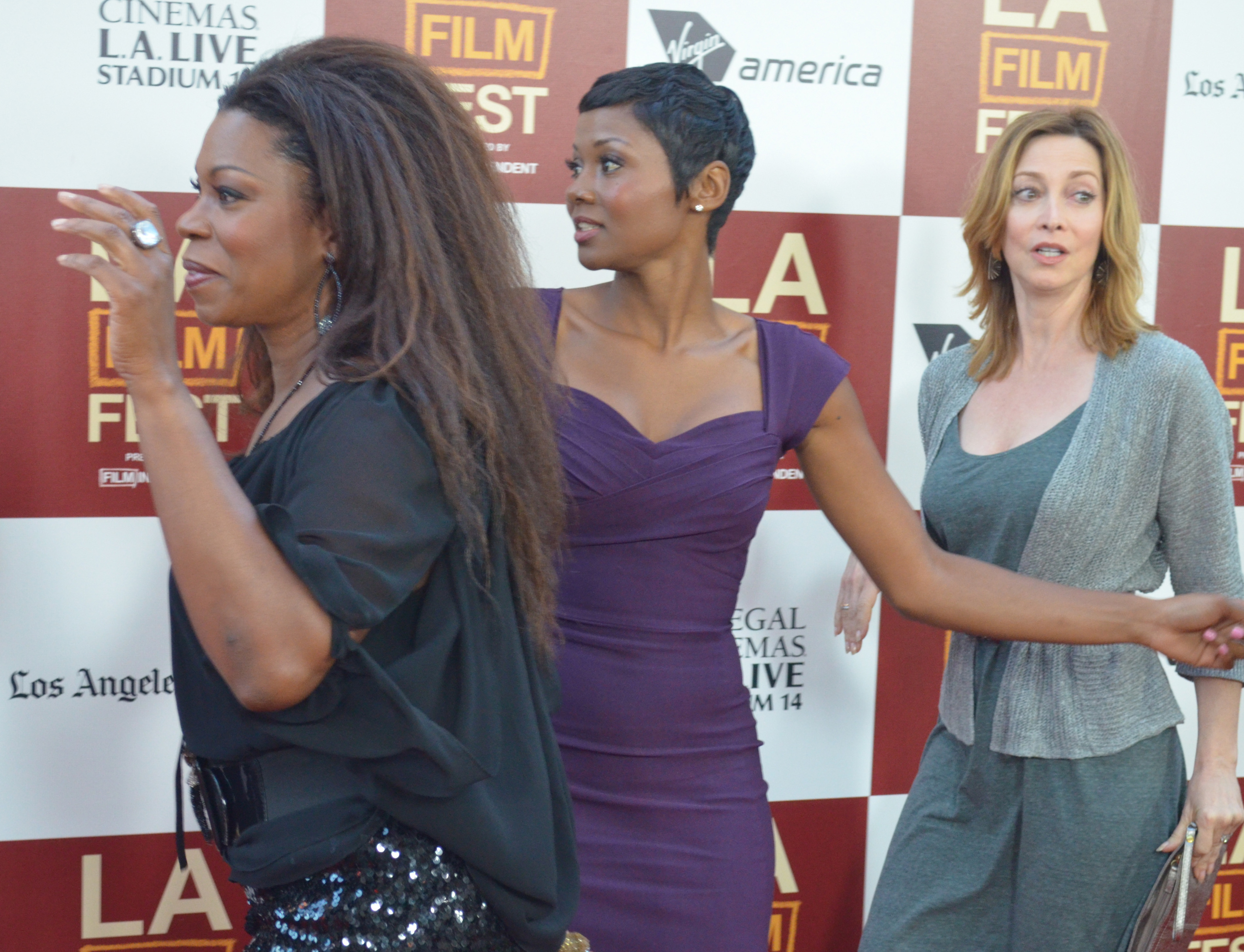
Corinealdi (center) with Lorraine Toussaint and Sharon Lawrence at the Middle of Nowhere premiere in 2012

In 2013, Corinealdi appeared in the short film The Door, part of Miu Miu's fashion series Women's Tales, which reunited her with her Middle of Nowhere director Ava DuVernay. In 2014, Corinealdi was cast in the drama series Hand of God. Later that year, she won the role of Frances Taylor Davis, the wife of Miles Davis in the biographical film Miles Ahead. She also starred in the horror film The Invitation and the coming-of-age drama Beats.

In 2016, Corinealdi played the role of Kunta Kinte's wife, Belle, in A&E's Roots reboot. From 2017 to 2019, she had a recurring role in the HBO comedy-drama series, Ballers, and in 2019 starred in the Ava DuVernay-produced limited series The Red Line on CBS. In 2022, she was cast in her first series television leading role in the Hulu legal drama Reasonable Doubt produced by Kerry Washington.

== Filmography ==
=== Film ===
Year	Title	Role	Notes
2000	Mortality	-	Short
2003	Pretty Lady	Azizi	
2004	A Taste of Us	Audrey Thomas	Short
2004	Vampz	Eve	Video
2005	Beauty Shop	Client of Ida	
2006	Finding the Boom-Bap	Beauty	Short
2006	My American Nurse	-	
2007	Akira's Hip-Hop Shop	Daphne	
2007	Cordially Invited	Grace Ingrahm	
2008	Natural Beauty	Virginia	Short
2008	The Nanny Express	Lorraine	TV movie
2009	Think Twice	Najah	Short
2009	After the Storm	Patrice	Short
2009	The Chase	Trisha	Short
2010	It Looks Just Like You	-	Short
2011	I Won't Complain	-	Short
2012	Middle of Nowhere	Ruby	
2012	The Silent Treatment	Loretta	Short
2013	The Door	V	Short
2013	Lu	Martha	Short
2014	Teacher in a Box	Mrs Tandon	Short
2014	Gun Hill	Janelle Evans	TV movie
2014	In the Morning	Cadence	
2014	Addicted	Brina	
2015	The Invitation	Kira	
2015	Miles Ahead	Frances Taylor Davis	
2019	Beats	Vanessa Robinson	

=== Television ===
Year	Title	Role	Notes
2007	The Young and the Restless	Nurse Susan Mehta	Regular Cast
2010	Romantically Challenged	Tiffany	Episode: "Rebecca's One Night Stand"
2014	Criminal Minds	Ellen Samsen	Episode: "The Edge of Winter"
2014–17	Hand of God	Tessie Graham	Main Cast
2015	Rosewood	Gigi Gaston	Episode: "Fashionistas and Fasciitis"
2016	Roots	Belle	Episode: "Part 2 & 4"
2017–19	Ballers	Candace Brewer	Recurring Cast: Season 3–5
2019	The Red Line	Tia Young	Main Cast
2020	Evil	Sonya	Episode: "Justice x 2"
2022-	Reasonable Doubt	Jax Stewart	Main Cast

== Awards and nominations ==
Year	Awards	Category	Recipient	Outcome
2012	Gotham Awards	Gotham Independent Film Award for Breakthrough Performer	Middle of Nowhere	Won
2012	African-American Film Critics Association	African-American Film Critics Association Award for Best Actress	Middle of Nowhere	Won
2013	Independent Spirit Award	Independent Spirit Award for Best Female Lead	Middle of Nowhere	Nominated
2013	NAACP Image Award	NAACP Image Award for Outstanding Actress in a Motion Picture	Middle of Nowhere	Nominated
2013	Black Reel Awards	Black Reel Award for Best Actress	Middle of Nowhere	Nominated
2013	Black Reel Awards	Black Reel Award for Best Breakthrough Performance	Middle of Nowhere	Nominated
2013	Black Reel Awards	Black Reel Award for Best Ensemble	Middle of Nowhere	Nominated
2013	Village Voice Film Poll	Village Voice Film Poll Award for Best Breakthrough Performance	Middle of Nowhere	Nominated
2017	NAACP Image Award	NAACP Image Award for Outstanding Actress in a Television Movie, Mini-Series or Dramatic Special	Roots	Nominated
2017	Black Reel Awards	Outstanding Supporting Actress, TV Movie or Limited Series	Roots	Nominated
2019	Black Reel Awards	Outstanding Actress, TV Movie/limited series	The Red Line	Nominated
2024	Celebration of Latino Cinema and Television	Actress Award – Television	Reasonable Doubt	Won
2025	NAACP Image Awards	Outstanding Actress in a Drama Series	Reasonable Doubt	Pending
