= Howard Charles =

British actor

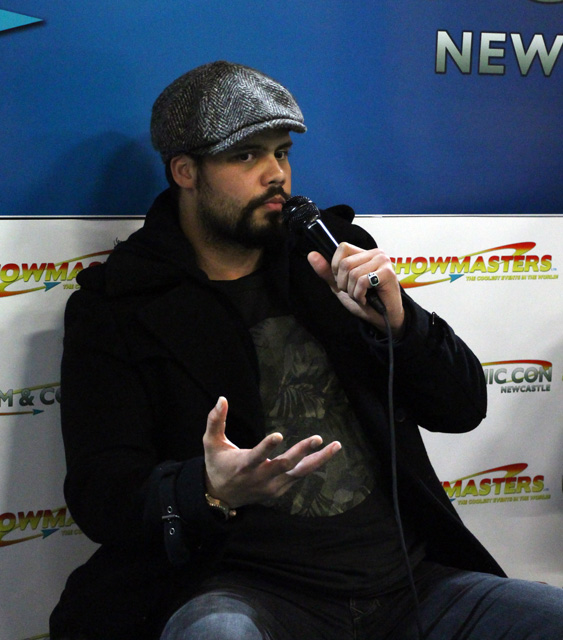
- Howard Charles in 2016
- Born: Brixton, London, United Kingdom
- Occupation: Actor
- Years active: 2008–present

Howard Charles is an English actor who is best known for his portrayal of Porthos in the BBC series The Musketeers (2014–2016) and DCI Mike McGuire in the Acorn TV crime drama Whitstable Pearl (2021-2024). He was born in Brixton, London.

== Education ==
He studied at Kingston College in England between 2000 and 2005, earning a BTEC Level 3 Diploma in Performing Arts (Acting) before returning to start the BA (Hons) Acting for Stage and Media.

He then trained at the Drama Centre London and was awarded a Lady Rothermere Drama Award and a Leverhulme scholarship.

== Theatre ==
Charles has appeared in: Blackta (The Young Vic), Macbeth (with the RSC), The Merchant of Venice (Royal Shakespeare Company), Enron (Chichester Festival Theatre, The Royal Court, West End), Painting A Wall (Finborough Theatre), The Hounding of David Olwale (various theatres including; Birmingham Repertory Theatre, Everyman Liverpool, Hackney Empire), Three Sisters (Manchester Royal Exchange), The Local Stigmatic (Edinburgh Festival), Les Jeudis (Centre Pompidou, Paris), Twelfth Night, The Lunatic Queen, Taniko, Measure for Measure, Le Cid, The Cherry Orchard and The Winslow Boy.

== Filmography ==
=== Film ===
Year	Title	Role	Notes
2010	Standing By	Titus	Short film
2011	Sound	Flynn	Short film
2013	&ME	Albert	
2018	Monster Party	Luther	
2018	The Scorpion King: Book of Souls	Uruk	Direct-to-video film
2025	Cleaner	Captain Royce	

=== Television ===
Year	Title	Role	Notes
2008	Beautiful People	Adult Kylie	Episode: "How I Got My Tongs"
2012	Switch	Jack	Episode #1.6
2012	Black Forest	Conrad	Television film
2013–2022	Top Boy	Curtis	7 episodes
2014–2016	The Musketeers	Porthos du Vallon	Main cast; 30 episodes
2017	The Librarians	Ambrose Gethic	Episode: "And the Bleeding Crown"
2019	The Widow	Tom Jansen	2 episodes
2019	The Red Line	Ethan Young	8 episodes
2020	Liar	Carl Peterson	4 episodes
2020	Alex Rider	Wolf	4 episodes
2021	Shadow and Bone	Arken Visser / The Conductor	5 episodes
2021–2024	Whitstable Pearl	Mike McGuire	18 episodes
2026	Fightland	Maduka "Duke" Kilroy	

=== Video games ===
Year	Title	Role
2015	Need for Speed	Manu
Cancelled	Legacy of Kain: Dead Sun	Emperor
