= Michael Patrick Thornton =

American actor and theater director (born 1979)

- Michael Patrick Thornton attending the "Being Heumann" Premiere at TIFF 2026
- Born: March 1, 1979 (age 47); Chicago, Illinois, U.S.
- Occupations: Actor, theater director
- Spouse: Lindsey Barlag Thornton (m. 2011)

Michael Patrick Thornton (born March 1, 1979) is an American actor and theater director. He played the character of Dr. Gabriel Fife in the ABC drama series Private Practice. He is also known for his performances on Broadway including as Lennox in the Sam Gold revival of Macbeth (2022), and Dr. Rank in the Jamie Lloyd revival of A Doll's House (2023).

== Early life and education ==
Thornton is from Jefferson Park, a neighborhood on Chicago's northwest side. He is a graduate of The School at Steppenwolf, The Second City Conservatory, and The Second City Directing Program. At 24, Thornton had two spinal strokes which paralysed him. Since then he has used a wheelchair.

== Career ==
Thornton is artistic director and co-founder of The Gift Theatre. He acted in productions including Richard III at Steppenwolf, where he became the first actor to act onstage while wearing a robotic exoskeleton. He has also portrayed Iago in Othello at The Gift Theatre and in Actors Theatre of Louisville’s 50th anniversary production of Our Town. Thornton received a Jeff Nomination for his performance in The Gift's premiere of ensemble member Andrew Hinderaker's Suicide, Incorporated. In 2005, he won the Jeff Award for Best Actor in a Solo Performance for his role in The Good Thief at The Gift Theatre.

Thornton also directs at The Gift, including the world premiere of David Rabe's Good For Otto, War of the Worlds, the Chicago Premiere of Will Eno's Oh, The Humanity (and other exclamations). As a writer, his plays have been workshopped in New York through Young Playwrights, Inc. and in Chicago through Second City.

In 2025 and 2026, Thornton appeared as Lucky in Waiting for Godot, a Jamie Lloyd production starring Keanu Reeves and Alex Winter on Broadway.

Thornton has appeared in episodes of Elementary (CBS), The Exorcist (FOX), Private Practice, The Chicago Code, Ron Howard's The Dilemma, and the independent feature film The View From Tall.

== Acting credits ==
=== Film ===
Year	Title	Role	Other notes
2003	Shut-Eye	Mac	
2007	Counting Backwards	Joe's Father	Voice
2011	The Dilemma	B & V Worker	
2016	The View from Tall	Douglas	
2026	The Last Day	John	
2026	Being Heumann	Ed Roberts	

=== Television ===
Year	Title	Role	Other notes
2009–2011	Private Practice	Dr. Gabriel Fife	14 episodes (season 3–4)
2011	The Chicago Code	Kent Eschelman (CPD Union Rep)	"St. Valentine's Day Massacre"
2016	The Jamz	Stanton	4 episodes
2016	The Exorcist	Dr. John Rexroth	"Chapter Six: Star of the Morning"
2017	Elementary	Eli Kotite	"Wrong Side of the Road"
2019	Counterpart	Brody	"Shadow Puppets"
2019	The Red Line	Jim Evans	Main role
2019	Magnum P.I.	Charlie Owens	"Payback for Beginners"
2019	Madam Secretary	Captain Evan Moore	4 episodes
2020	All Rise	Paul Gordon	"Prelude to a Fish"
2020	Away	Dr. Putney	Recurring role, 5 episodes
2021	A Million Little Things	Russ	Recurring role (season 4)
2022	61st Street	Judge Fitzpatrick	4 episodes
2022	Let the Right One In	Father Sean	3 episodes
2022	Chicago Party Aunt	Stewart	Voice, 3 episodes
2022–2023	The Good Doctor	Dr. Clay Porter	Recurring role, 5 episodes
2023	NCIS	Jeremy Brighton	"Old Wounds"
2025	Black Rabbit	Trevor Turkel	"Skin Contact"

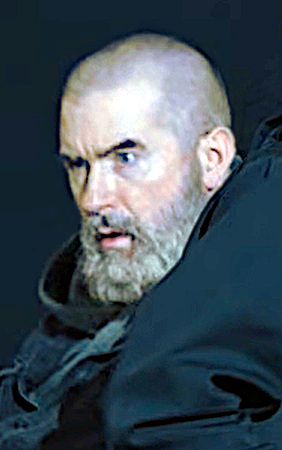
In Waiting for Godot

=== Theater ===
Year	Title	Role	Playwright	Notes
2016	Richard III	Richard III	William Shakespeare	Steppenwolf Merle Reskin Garage Theatre, Chicago
2022	Macbeth	Lennox	William Shakespeare	Longacre Theatre, Broadway
2023	A Doll's House	Dr. Rank	Henrik Ibsen	Hudson Theatre, Broadway
2025	Waiting for Godot	Lucky	Samuel Beckett	Hudson Theatre, Broadway
