= Attack of the 5 Ft. 2 In. Women =

- Film poster
- Also known as: National Lampoon's Attack of the 5 Ft. 2 In. Women
- Genre: Comedy
- Written by: Julie Brown; Charlie Coffey
- Directed by: Julie Brown; Richard Wenk
- Starring: Julie Brown; Peter DeLuise; Anne De Salvo; Stanley DeSantis; Eric "Sparky" Edwards; Khrystyne Haje; John Robert Hoffman; Sam McMurray; Stella Stevens; Adam Storke; Dick Miller; Stacey Travis
- Theme music composer: Christopher Tyng
- Country of origin: United States
- Original language: English

Production
- Executive producers: David Jablin; James P. Jimirro
- Producers: Peter Manoogian; J. Marina Muhlfriedel
- Cinematography: Rex Nicholson
- Editor: Debra Chiate
- Running time: 82 min.

Original release
- Network: Showtime
- Release: August 21, 1994

National Lampoon's Attack of the 5 Ft. 2 In. Women is an American 1994 Showtime television film that parodies two sensational news stories from the 1990s: the Tonya Harding-Nancy Kerrigan incident, and the John and Lorena Bobbitt incident. The film is presented as a double feature, with Julie Brown starring in both segments. The title is a takeoff of Attack of the 50 Foot Woman.

== Synopsis ==
The film is presented as two parts of a double feature, the titles being Tonya: The Battle of Wounded Knee and He Never Gave Me Orgasm: The Lenora Babbitt Story.

=== Tonya: The Battle of Wounded Knee ===
Figure skater Tonya Hardly (Brown), desperate to win the gold medal in the Olympics, tries to eliminate competitor Nancy Cardigan (Khrystyne Haje) by hiring someone to injure her; although she only suffers a small bruise. The news story is so tragic and heart-rending that all of Tonya's co-conspirators turn themselves in and implicate her. Sailing above the scandal, she goes on to compete at the 1994 Winter Olympics, but is undone by her lack of talent and undersized panties.

=== He Never Gave Me Orgasm: The Lenora Babbitt Story ===
Lenora Babbitt (Brown), having been recently pardoned for her crimes, tells Dick Langley (Sam McMurray) about the events that had led up to her arrest: She had cut off the penis of her drunken husband, Juan Wayne Babbitt (Adam Storke), because he could not satisfy her sexually. After it was devoured by a dog, Dr. Kelloc (Stanley DeSantis) was able to transplant one from a deceased biker. However, Lenora learns that the biker's widow (Anne De Salvo) now has "visitation rights" to it; thus, when she and Juan perform a re-enactment of the incident on TV, she actually cuts off his new one. He ends up becoming a transsexual, saying on talk shows that he now understands how hard it is to be a woman.

=== Animated sequences ===
The film includes animated sequences in which Tonya and Lenora are watching the picture at a drive-in theater. They arrive together in a car at the beginning, Tonya cheers after the first feature, and the two grinning women drive off at the end.

== Cast ==
- Julie Brown as Tonya Hardly / Lenora Babbitt
- Lisa Arch as Dotty (credited as Lisa Kushell)
- Priscilla Barnes as Crystal
- Jennifer Butt as Oksana Bayou
- Jodi Carlisle as Debbie Dallas
- Lilyan Chauvin as Coach
- Margaret Cho as Connie Tong
- Charlie Coffey as Tonya's Lawyer
- Peter DeLuise as Stan Stant
- Anne De Salvo as Cycle Slut
- Stanley DeSantis as Dr. Kelloc
- Eric Edwards as Sean Heckardt (credited as Eric 'Sparky' Edwards)
- Lance Gordon as Lawanda's Man
- Charles Gunning as Mr. Electricity
- Khrystyne Haje as Nancy Cardigan
- Melora Hardin as Tonya's Coach
- John Robert Hoffman as Jeff Googooly
- Stephanie Hudson as "Cookie" (credited as Tonya Poole)
- Janice Kent as Nancy's Coach
- Cathy Ladman as Virgin Mary
- Vicki Lawrence as Herself
- Julie Lunney as Nancy's Double
- Sam McMurray as Dick Langley
- Dick Miller as Officer Murphy
- Rick Overton as Officer Brown
- Brad Sherwood as Mime
- Julie Shott as Tonya's Double
- Bridget Sienna as Maria
- Stella Stevens as Lawanda
- Adam Storke as Juan Wayne Babbitt
- Liz Torres as Lenora's Mother
- Nick Toth as Nancy's Father
- Stacey Travis as Christy
- Susan Watson as Nancy's Mother
- Brianna Weissmann as Little Tonya
- Karl Wiedergott as Dirk Smith

== Advertising and release ==
The television film was promoted on the cover of the September/October 1994 issue of National Lampoon magazine.

In 2008, Julie Brown was given permission by Showtime to issue this movie on DVD (Showtime had previously only issued it on VHS) and currently sells copies on her eBay profile and online store.

== Reception ==
An article in the Los Angeles Times covering the production commented, "What’s the only thing more frightening than a pair of 5-foot-2 females with a chip on their shoulders? That same pair in ice skates and stilettos, argues “National Lampoon’s Attack of the 5 Ft. 2 Women,” premiering Sunday on Showtime."

The film received generally a very mixed retrospective assessment, Vanity Fair even calling it "dreck". "Despite an impressive supporting cast, both minifeatures are crude ..." commented another reviewer.
