= Just Say Julie =

- DVD cover for Just Say Julie
- Genre: Satire; Music television
- Created by: Julie Brown; Charlie Coffey; Charlie Singer
- Starring: Julie Brown
- Country of origin: United States
- No. of seasons: 3

Production
- Executive producers: Charlie Singer; Julie Brown; Charlie Coffey
- Running time: 30 mins.

Original release
- Network: MTV
- Release: February 15, 1989 – February 1, 1992

Just Say Julie is an American comedy/music video show created by and starring comedian and singer Julie Brown. The series aired from 1989 to 1992 on MTV in the United States, where it aired on Friday nights during its run.

== Series background ==
Though Brown was considered an MTV VJ, her only function in playing videos came through her show. The show was extremely popular because it went against MTV's image of playing patsy to popular artists of questionable talent. Brown, as a satirical valley-girl version of herself, would often introduce,"jump into" (by blue screen) or speak after a video with negative, scathing comments about the artist. Teen stars like Tiffany and Debbie Gibson were frequently mocked along with Samantha Fox and Paula Abdul (questioning her tap dancing and talent). A notable example: after playing a Sheena Easton video, Brown quipped that "maybe we should all sleep with Prince so he'll write songs for us." Easton, whose songs were produced by Prince (including "Sugar Walls"), was reputedly outraged, although she would appear as herself in an episode. In another episode Julie provides running commentary as Tawny Kitaen as the Whitesnake video, 'Here I Go Again' plays, saying "Here's my boyfriend David Coverdale... He's the reason I model in a video, because I'm sleeping with him." Julie would also aim barbs at the MTV audience, such as in 'The Nuclear Show': "Hello, MTV-ers. Let's talk about personal hygiene a moment, shall we? For you MTVers that simply means taking a bath. ...You may not care about the way you smell, but think about your co-workers who have to be close to you behind the counter at Burger Boy. Don't they count?"

A popular target was Madonna; Brown insinuated that the young boy in her Cherish video was the love child of Madonna and a dolphin. In the episode "How to Date" Julie says "Don't underestimate the value of parking in cars. Look what it did for Madonna!", and in "The Nuclear Show": "There's more to life than watching MTV, shoplifting and having meaningless sex with people you don't know or care about. Right, Madonna?" Brown would go on to do a scathing mockumentary of Madonna called Medusa: Dare to be Truthful.

Most episodes would also feature a "plot" that was used to string together the videos. In one episode, Julie sells her soul to the devil. Other episodes had Julie shrink herself in order to fight a beauty queens cold after going up her nose. In another, a blonde supermodel thinks too hard and accidentally blows her brain out of her ear and onto the floor. In the episode "Just Say Bon Jovi" Julie claims to be Jon Bon Jovi's girlfriend, and plays only Bon Jovi videos. At the end of the show, Jon Bon Jovi appears via video to thank Julie for her support, although he initially confuses her with Downtown Julie Brown. During the run, she hosted two editions of "Julie's Choice For The Julie's" a parody of the Emmy's complete with a song and dance from Brown.

She even got her chance to show the video for her 1984 song that MTV refused to air, "The Homecoming Queen's Got a Gun", in the episode 'My Evil Twin' where her "sister" Debi (the "Homecoming Queen" from the video, who was "shot" to death, but survived) escaped a mental institution to seek revenge on Julie, and succeeded.

Another recurring gag in most episodes would include a product ostensibly endorsed by a popular celebrity, but inherently flawed. For instance, Julie enjoyed a new breakfast cereal called "Prince Puffs", but found a fly inside the box; when the fly was exposed to Julie's "Sheenapoo" (Sheena Easton shampoo) it became a mutant. Easton later appeared on the show disguising herself as a maid to make Julie go crazy in return for all the times she's made fun of her.

At times Brown was jealous of having her show on the same network that featured another person with the same name, "Downtown Julie Brown", who was the host of Club MTV and whom she would refer to as the "Evil Julie Brown". That 'rivalry' would result in an episode in which the two met face to face only for them to be trapped in the condo, but later rescued by Randee of the Redwoods.

Many other celebrities appeared at Julie's condo including "Weird Al" Yankovic(in the pilot), -Michael McKean, Gene Simmons, Linda Blair, Kip Winger, Colin Quinn, Ken Ober (via telephone), MTV VJ Martha Quinn, and Elvira.

The show made way for the persona Brown became known for: an egocentric, over-the-top, kooky valley girl with an attitude.

Toward the end of the series run she adopted the "Eco-Gal" persona and along with "Recycle Man" they drove around looking for wrongdoers (like spotting Stevie Nicks twirling around in her driveway and throwing her mail all over the ground).

The show and Brown were parodied on the 1990s cartoon show Tiny Toon Adventures, with Brown voicing the host of "Just Say Julie Bruin."

In 2006, Brown bought the rights to the show and released the DVDs The Very Best of Just Say Julie Volume #1 and The Very Best of Just Say Julie Volume #2 1/2. The DVDs are available through her website and released by "Just Say Julie Productions".

Despite airing for three seasons, Just Say Julie is one of the very few shows that do not have an episode guide or list.

== Cast ==
- Julie Brown: Star of the show, a valley girl with attitude.
- Larry Poindexter: Plays cute guys Julie would usually flirt with, like the Nuclear Technician in 'The Nuclear Show' or Recycle Man in 'Eco Girl and Recycle Man'. He is introduced in 'How to Date' as: 'Musician, actor and man about Hollywood, Larry Poindexter.'
- Stacey Travis: Longtime friend of Julie Brown, she is in almost all of her videos. On the show she plays cute blondes like the model Lake Arrowhead in 'How to be a Model', Sissy White in 'Just Say Bon Jovi 2' and Ashley in 'Salute to Animals'.
- Charlie Coffey – The associate producer of the show, he usually plays the stage manager, as in 'The PMS Show' and 'Just Say Bon Jovi 2'.
- Stanley DeSantis: played "The Devil" in 2 episodes in which he tries to get Julie to sell her soul as well as various other oddball characters.
- Jodi Carlisle: Plays 'Mom' types, such as a contest winner that Julie gives a makeover to in 'How to Be a Model', and Abbey Landers, the advice columnist that attacks Larry in 'How to Date'.
- Celia Arden: Julie's real-life Mom appears as herself in some episodes, such as 'Popo the Clown' and 'My Very Own Movie'.
- Paul Brown: Julie's real-life brother plays himself on the show. He is usually broke and tries to borrow money from Julie, as in 'How to be a Model' and 'My Very Own Movie'.
