= Savannah Dooley =

American screenwriter (born 1985)

- Born: August 31, 1985 (age 41); New York City, U.S.
- Education: Bennington College
- Occupations: Screenwriter, television producer
- Parent(s): Winnie Holzman (mother); Paul Dooley (father)
- Writing career
- Period: 2006–present
- Notable work: Huge (2010)

Savannah Dooley (born August 31, 1985) is an American screenwriter and television producer, best known as the co-creator of the television series Huge.

== Early life ==
Dooley was born in Manhattan, New York, to Winnie Holzman, a writer, and Paul Dooley, an actor. Dooley has said that her mother's work on My So Called Life, "doing some groundbreaking stuff with gay teenagers," helped her to come out as queer herself to her parents. She attended Bennington College, where she studied screenwriting and video production, and graduated in 2007. In 2007, Dooley co-wrote Fred Phelps The Musical, which was presented in a workshop starring Randy Blair and Max Jenkins with lyricist Kaley McMahon and director Ryan Mekenian.

== Career ==
Dooley was still in college when television producer Robin Schiff, a family friend, asked Dooley in 2007 to script a television film for ABC Family based on Sasha Paley's novel Huge, about a group of teenagers at a weight-loss camp. Schiff had been interested in directing the adaptation but, having been Dooley's longtime writing mentor, wanted her to write the script. Dooley completed the script but ABC Family dropped the project when the 2007–2008 Writers Guild of America strike began in November 2007 and halted development. When the strike ended, Dooley began to work on several other projects, including a pilot for CBS which was never picked up. In 2009, ABC Family approached Dooley again about rewriting her adaptation of Huge as a 10-episode television series. Since Schiff was unable to work full-time on the show and the network wanted an experienced producer, Dooley suggested that her mother Winnie Holzman join the show as a writer and producer. Huge also features Dooley's father Paul Dooley in a small acting role as the camp cook and her uncle Ernest Holzman as the director of photography.

Dooley co-wrote and directed a short film, Snapshot, with Miranda Sajdak, about the first meeting between a girl's mother and her prom date, which premiered at the 2010 Outfest.
