= Paul Dooley =

American actor (born 1928)

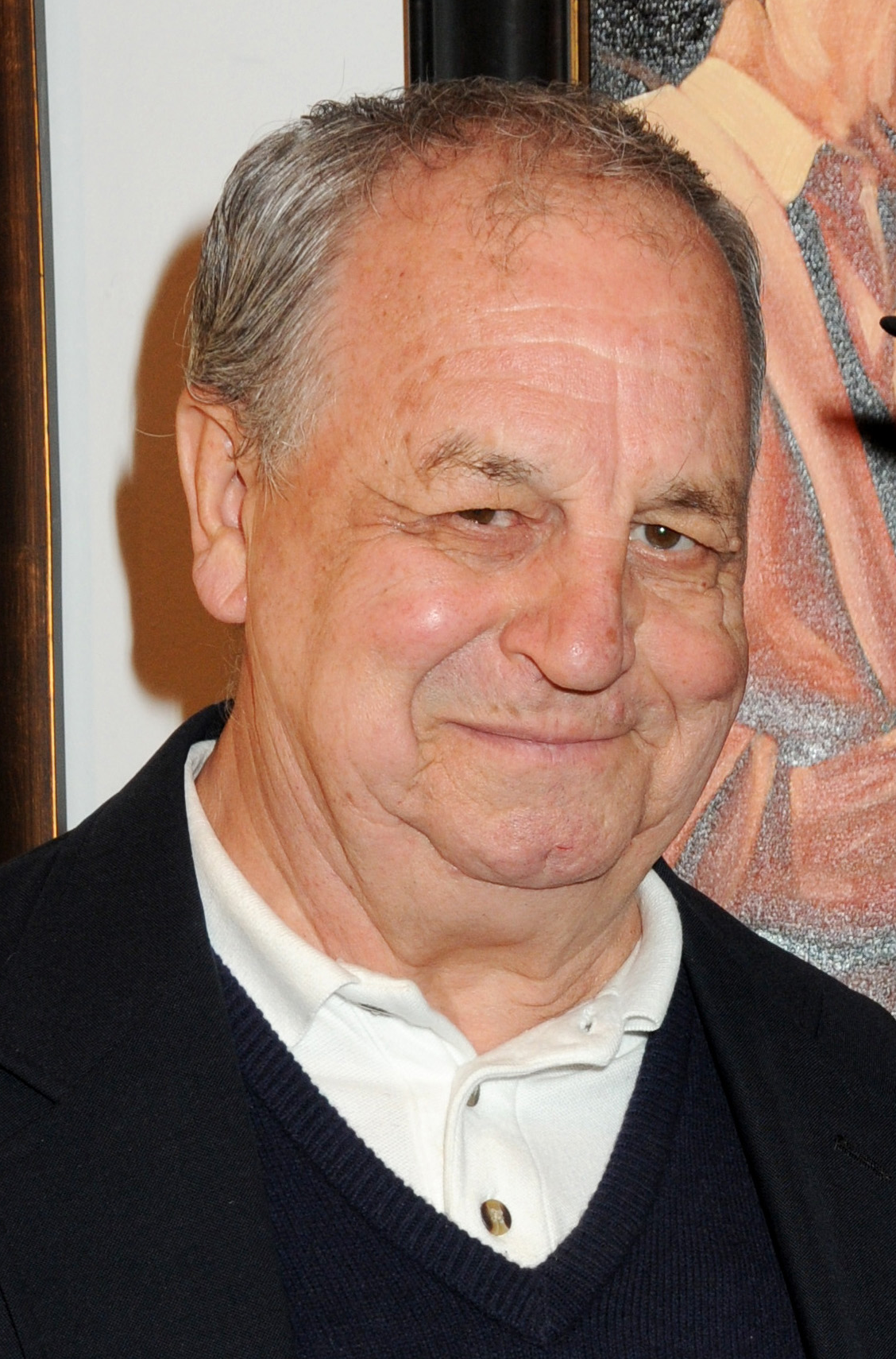
- Dooley in 2010
- Born: Paul Brown; February 22, 1928 (age 98); Parkersburg, West Virginia, U.S.
- Education: West Virginia State University
- Occupation: Actor
- Years active: 1954–present
- Spouses: Lee Wasser (m. 1958; div. 1983); Winnie Holzman (m. 1984)
- Children: 4, including Savannah
- Website: pauldooleyactor.com

Paul Dooley (né Brown; born February 22, 1928) is an American character actor, television writer and comedian. He is known for his roles in Breaking Away, Popeye, Strange Brew, Sixteen Candles, Cars and various Christopher Guest mockumentaries. He co-created the PBS children's show The Electric Company.

== Early life ==
Dooley was born Paul Brown on February 22, 1928, in Parkersburg, West Virginia, the son of Ruth Irene (née Barringer), a homemaker, and Pete James Brown, a factory worker.

He said Parkersburg had few attractions that interested him because there were not many cultural opportunities. He enjoyed listening to comedians on the radio, especially Jimmy Durante. In high school, he often performed at fairs as a clown named Dooley. In the mid-1950s, he legally changed his surname to match his clown persona, there already being a Broadway actor named Paul Brown.

Dooley was a cartoonist as a youth and drew a strip for a local paper in Parkersburg. In 1946, he joined the United States Navy and served for two years before returning home and graduating from West Virginia State University in 1952.

== Career ==
After graduation Dooley went to New York City to work in the entertainment industry. He initially found work as a clown for children's birthday parties.

In the early 1950s he made his debut on the New York stage and was discovered by director Mike Nichols cast him in 1965's The Odd Couple on Broadway. Dooley appeared as Oscar's poker crony, Homer "Speed" Deegan and understudied Art Carney, who portrayed Felix Unger; when Carney left the play later on, Dooley assumed the role of Felix. Dooley was represented by the William Morris Agency, thanks to a referral from Walter Matthau, who played Oscar Madison in the play.

Also having an interest in comedy, Dooley was a stand-up comedian for five years, eventually landing on The Tonight Show, and a member of the Compass Players and The Second City troupe in New York City. Fellow members of The Second City at that time were Alan Arkin and Alan Alda.

Dooley also worked as a writer. He created and was one of the head writers on The Electric Company, produced by the Children's Television Workshop for PBS in the United States. Dooley wrote "runners", a series of short sketches with 8 or 10 characters that were broadcast over the course of several weeks. He found out years later that Carl Reiner had recommended him for the job. Some of the characters Dooley created for The Electric Company included Easy Reader (Morgan Freeman) and Fargo North, Decoder (Skip Hinnant), as well as the soap opera spoof Love of Chair.

Dooley formed a company with Andrew Duncan and Lynne Lipton called All Over Creation to create commercials for radio and television. They produced around 500 TV commercials and 1,000 radio spots. A character named Paul the Gorilla that appeared in television commercials was named after him.

=== Films ===
Dooley has appeared in such films as Sixteen Candles, Popeye, Raggedy Ann and Andy: A Musical Adventure, Breaking Away, Runaway Bride, and the voice of Sarge in the Disney/Pixar films Cars, Cars 2 and Cars 3.

He worked with Robert Altman regularly and is known as a prolific journeyman character actor. After Altman saw Dooley in the Jules Feiffer comedy Hold Me, he signed him for a role in his film A Wedding.

He and Altman co-wrote the film Health.

He was also in the director's cut of Little Shop of Horrors, but was replaced by Jim Belushi in the final cut.

Dooley has worked with Christopher Guest on a number of films, including Death Wish, Little Shop of Horrors, and the Guest-directed films Waiting for Guffman, A Mighty Wind, and For Your Consideration.

=== Television ===
Dooley has also appeared as a variety of recurrent characters on numerous television shows, including ER, My So-Called Life, Dream On, Grace Under Fire, thirtysomething, Curb Your Enthusiasm, ALF (playing Whizzer Deaver), Chicago Hope, and Star Trek: Deep Space Nine where he played the recurring role of Enabran Tain. He guest starred in other primetime shows like Bewitched, The Wonder Years, Sabrina, the Teenage Witch, Hot in Cleveland, Law & Order: Criminal Intent, and Desperate Housewives. With Rita Moreno, he appeared in The Golden Girls episode "Empty Nests" which had been intended to be a backdoor pilot for what would eventually become Empty Nest. Dooley starred in the short-lived comedy about a couple living in an Arizona retirement community, Coming of Age, opposite veteran actors Phyllis Newman, Glynis Johns and Alan Young. In 2000, he was nominated for an Emmy Award for his role as an eccentric judge on The Practice.

In 2010, Dooley played the part of the head chef at Camp Victory, a fictional fat camp, on the short-lived ABC Family original series Huge, which was created and written by his wife and daughter.

In 2014, he appeared in an episode of the NBC series Parenthood as Rocky, a fellow vet and retiree to Craig T. Nelson's Zeek Braverman.

In 2017, he appeared in the episode "22 Steps" of the ABC series The Good Doctor as Glenn, a 72-year-old man with a failing heart who breaks his pacemaker because he wants to die due to the constant pain he is suffering.

=== Theater ===
Dooley co-wrote the play Assisted Living with his wife Winnie Holzman. It was their first theatrical collaboration. The play premiered on April 5, 2013.

== Personal life ==
Dooley has been married to Winnie Holzman, whom he first met at an improv acting class in New York, since November 18, 1984. The couple have a daughter Savannah and live in Toluca Lake in Los Angeles.

Dooley was previously married to Donna Lee Wasser on September 19, 1958, which ended in divorce. He has three children from his first marriage.

In 2022, Dooley published his memoir, titled Movie Dad: Finding Myself and My Family, On Screen and Off.

== Filmography ==
=== Film ===
Year	Title	Role	Notes
1964	The Parisienne and the Prudes	Ted K. Worrie	
1970	The Out-of-Towners	Hotel Clerk - Day	
1972	Up the Sandbox	Statue of Liberty Guard	
1974	The Gravy Train	Doctor	
1974	Death Wish	Cop At Hospital	Uncredited
1975	Fore Play	Salesman	
1977	Slap Shot	Hyannisport Announcer	
1977	Raggedy Ann & Andy: A Musical Adventure	Gazooks	Voice
1978	A Wedding	"Snooks" Brenner	
1979	A Perfect Couple	Alex Theodopoulos	
1979	Breaking Away	Ray Stohler	
1979	Rich Kids	Simon Peterfreund	
1980	Health	Dr. Gil Gainey	
1980	Popeye	J. Wellington Wimpy	
1981	Paternity	Kurt	
1982	Endangered Species	Joe Hiatt	
1982	Kiss Me Goodbye	Kendall	
1983	Strange Brew	Uncle Claude Elsinore	
1983	Going Berserk	Dr. Ted	
1984	Sixteen Candles	Jim Baker	
1985	O.C. and Stiggs	Randall Schwab	
1986	Little Shop of Horrors	Patrick Martin	Director's cut only
1986	Monster in the Closet	Roy	
1986	Big Trouble	Noozel	
1988	Last Rites	Father Freddie	
1988	Lip Service	Gilbert "Gil" Hutchinson	
1990	Flashback	Stark	
1991	White Hot: The Mysterious Murder of Thelma Todd	Hal Roach	
1991	Shakes the Clown	Owen Cheese	
1992	The Player	Himself	
1993	My Boyfriend's Back	Chuck "Big Chuck"	
1993	A Dangerous Woman	Tupperware Salesman	
1995	Evolver	Jerry Briggs	
1995	Out There	Emmett Davis	
1995	The Underneath	Ed Dutton	
1996	God's Lonely Man	Polo	
1996	Waiting for Guffman	UFO Abductee	
1997	Loved	Leo Amerson	
1997	Clockwatchers	Bud Chapman	
1997	Telling Lies in America	Father Norton	
1997	Angels in the Endzone	Coach Buck	
1999	Happy, Texas	The Judge	
1999	Guinevere	Walter	
1999	Error in Judgment	Jack Albert	
1999	Runaway Bride	Walter Carpenter	
2000	I'll Remember April	Earl Schimmel	
2001	Recess Christmas: Miracle on Third Street	Hank, The Janitor / Mall Santa	Voice
2001	Stealing Time	Hank	
2002	Crazy Little Thing	Jimmy's Dad	
2002	Insomnia	Chief Charlie "Bubbles" Nyback	
2003	A Mighty Wind	George Menschell	
2003	Nobody Knows Anything!	The Warden	
2004	Employee of the Month	Reverend Ben Goodwin	
2004	Adventures in Homeschooling (Short)	"Pop" Hemple	
2005	Come Away Home	Grandpa Donald Brooks	
2005	Madison	Mayor Don Vaughn	
2006	Cars	Sarge	Voice
2006	For Your Consideration	Paper Badge Sergeant	
2007	Hairspray	Mr. Spritzer	Nominated — Screen Actors Guild Award for Outstanding Performance by a Cast in a Motion Picture
2008	Sunshine Cleaning	Sherman "Sherm"	
2008	Chronic Town	Eleanor's Father	
2008	Bedtime Stories	Hot Dog Vendor	
2009	Horsemen	Father Whiteleather	
2010	Ironmen	Connors	
2011	Thanks	Hank	
2011	Cars 2	Sarge	Voice
2012	Game Night	Marvin Garden	
2013	Turbo	The Foreman	Voice
2016	Other People	Ronnie	
2016	The Holy Man	Lou "The Bull" Devine	
2017	Cars 3	Sarge	Voice
2020	Selfie Dad	Barber	
2021	Saving Paradise	Gramps	
2023	Boy Makes Girl	Ben	

=== Television ===
Year	Title	Role	Notes
1963	East Side/West Side	Charlie Welty	Episode: "No Hiding Place"
1964	The Defenders	R.W. Wheeler	Episode: "Conflict of Interests"
1966	Get Smart	Hanlon	Episode: "The Greatest Spy on Earth"
1966	Bewitched	TV Man	Episode: "Oedipus Hex"
1968	A Punt, a Pass, and a Prayer	Photographer	Television film
1970	The Night the Animals Talked	Unknown Role	Voice, Television special
1972	The Corner Bar	Unknown Role	Episode: "Flanagan's Wake"
1974–1975	Sesame Street	Parrot	Voice, 2 episodes
1977	Simple Gifts	Unknown Role	Voice, Television special
1980	Captain Kangaroo	Unknown Role	
1981	Jules Feiffer's Hold Me	Man #1	Television film
1981	See China and Die	Ames Prescott	Television film
1982	American Playhouse	Detective	Episode: "The Shady Hill Kidnapping"
1982–1983	Faerie Tale Theatre	Father / The Miller	2 episodes
1983	The Wilder Summer	Camp Cook	Television film
1983	Don't Eat the Pictures	Museum Security Guard	Television special
1985	CBS Schoolbreak Special	Dr. Wormer	Episode: "The Day the Senior Class Got Married"
1985	Spenser: For Hire	Bryce Taylor	Episode: "Resurrection"
1986	Tales from the Darkside	Chester Caruso	Episode: "The Old Soft Shoe"
1986–1987	The Golden Girls	George Corliss / Isaac Q. Newton	2 episodes
1987–1989	ALF	Whizzer	3 episodes
1988	The Murder of Mary Phagan	William J. Burns	Miniseries
1988	Superman 50th Anniversary	John Buxton, Editor Metropolis Proclaimer	Television special
1988–1989	Coming of Age	Dick Hale	15 episodes
1989	Guts and Glory: The Rise and Fall of Oliver North	John Buxton, Editor Metropolis Proclaimer	Television film
1989	When He's Not a Stranger	Ben McKenna	Television film
1990	Thirtysomething	Bob Spano	2 episodes
1990	The Court-Martial of Jackie Robinson	Willy Bailey	Television film
1990	Guess Who's Coming For Christmas	"Doc"	Television film
1991	Mathnet	Casey Bengal	Episode: "The Case of the Unnatural"
1991	Evening Shade	Rayford Taggart	Episode: "The Trials of Wood Newton"
1991	Coach	Horace Van Dam	Episode: "A Father and Son Reunion"
1991	My Life and Times	Jack Miller	Episode: "Our Wedding"
1991	Sunday Dinner	Jack	Episode: "My Dinner with Jack and Delores"
1991	Square One Television	Casey Bengal	2 episodes
1991	The Wonder Years	"Pops"	Episode: "Soccer"
1991	Pros and Cons	Archie Williams	Episode: "Ho! Ho! Hold Up!"
1992	Batman: The Animated Series	Father Michael	Voice, Episode: "It's Never Too Late"
1992	Perry Mason: The Case of the Heartbroken Bride	Assistant District Attorney Robert Norrell	Television film
1992	Mad About You	Gus Stemple	Episode: "Paul in the Family"
1992	The Ben Stiller Show	Mr. Adult / The Professor	2 episodes
1992	Room for Two	Wally	Episode: "Dog Day Afternoons"
1992–1994	Dream On	Mickey Tupper	8 episodes
1993	Cooperstown	Sid Wiggins	Television film
1993	Mother of the Bride	Robert Becker	Television film
1993	Traveler's Rest	Andy Milligan	Television film
1993	Tales of the City	Herb Tolliver	3 episodes
1993	Tales from the Crypt	Randolph	Episode: "Forever Ambergris"
1993	L.A. Law	Karl Bullen	Episode: "Safe Sex"
1994	The Mommies	Frank Kellogg	Episode: "The Old Man Cometh"
1994	State of Emergency	Jim Anderson	Television film
1994	Chicago Hope	Walter McTeague	Episode: "Over the Rainbow"
1994	Sisters	Erin "The Bargain" Baron	Episode: "Bombshell"
1994	My So-Called Life	Chuck Wood	2 episodes
1994–1996	Grace Under Fire	John Shirley	22 episodes
1994–1997	Star Trek: Deep Space Nine	Enabran Tain	4 episodes
1995	The Computer Wore Tennis Shoes	Senator Thatch	Television film
1995–1996, 2004	ER	Henry Lewis	4 episodes
1996	High Society	Melvin "Mel"	Episode: "Touching Up Your Roots"
1996	Ellen	Thomas Kelsey	Episode: "Lobster Diary"
1996	Millennium	Joe Bangs	Episode: "The Well-Worn Lock"
1997	Early Edition	McGinty	Episode: "Home"
1997	Sabrina the Teenage Witch	Ralphie	Episode: "A Doll's Story"
1998	Sleepwalkers	Joel	Episode: "Passed Imperfect"
1998–1999	Tracey Takes On...	Cop / Agent Ivan Hamel	2 episodes
1999	Dharma & Greg	Judge Harper	Episode: "Dharma & Greg on a Hot Tin Roof"
1999–2002	The Practice	Judge Philip Swackheim	8 episodes
2000–2002, 2004–2005	Curb Your Enthusiasm	Cheryl's Father	7 episodes
2001	Ally McBeal	Nicholas Engblume	Episode: "Reasons to Believe"
2001	Providence	Bill Ridley	Episode: "Saved by the Bell"
2001	The Geena Davis Show	Bill	Episode: "Photo Finish"
2001	A Woman's a Helluva Thing	Hank Luckinbill	Television film
2001	Kate Brasher	Father	Episode: "Jeff"
2001	Jack & Jill	Father Conlin	Episode: "The Time/Sex Continuum"
2001	The Huntress	Dante Cicollo	Episode: "Undercover"
2001–2002	Once and Again	Les Cresswell	6 episodes
2003	Law & Order: Criminal Intent	Stan Coffman	Episode: "Cherry Red"
2003	Tracey Ullman in the Trailer Tales	Dean Duaney	Television special
2003	Becker	Mr. Lerner	Episode: "What's Love Got to Do with It?"
2003	Comfort and Joy	George	Television film
2004	CSI: Crime Scene Investigation	Buddy Ween	Episode: "Getting Off"
2005	Hopeless Pictures	The Bartender	Voice
2005	Desperate Housewives	Addison Prudy	3 episodes
2006	The Jake Effect	Mr. Bernthal	Episode: "The Intervention"
2007	7th Heaven	"Red"	Episode: "Small Miracles"
2007	Side Order of Life	Sam Wainwright	Episode: "When Pigs Fly"
2007	Boston Legal	Judge Wendel Donahue	Episode: "Hope and Gory"
2008	Grey's Anatomy	Dr. Walter Tapley	Episode: "Losing My Mind"
2009	Scrubs	Paul	Episode: "Our Histories"
2010	Tracey Ullman's State of the Union	Harry Rinaldi	Episode: "Locked and Loaded"
2010	Huge	Joe Sosniak	10 episodes
2011	Private Practice	Abe Nussbaum	Episode: "Heaven Can Wait"
2012	Hot in Cleveland	Bearded Man / Santa	Episode: "Claus, Tails & High-Pitched Males: Birthdates 3"
2012	The Client List	Earl Hudson	Episode: "Past Is Prologue"
2013	Criminal Minds	Chip Gordon	Episode: "All That Remains"
2013	Major Crimes	Larry Murdock	Episode: "There's No Place Like Home"
2013	Super Fun Night	The Old Man	Episode: "Merry Super Fun Christmas"
2013	My Santa	Martin	Television film
2014	Parenthood	Rocky	Episode: "Promises"
2015	Comedy Bang! Bang!	Rocky	Episode: "Dax Shepard Wears a Heather Grey Shirt and Black Blazer"
2016	The Skinny!	Grandpa	Episode: "Relapse"
2016	Childrens Hospital	Grandpa Ben	Episode: "Grandparents Day"
2016	Young & Hungry	Mr. Fancy	2 episodes
2017	Workaholics	Ralph	Episode: "Faux Chella"
2017	The Good Doctor	Glen	Episode: "22 Steps"
2018	Shameless	Frank	2 episodes
2018	The Guest Book	Uncle Bill	Episode: "Killer Party"
2018	Bizaardvark	Uncle Morty	Episode: "A Capella Problems"
2018–2019	The Kids Are Alright	Father Cecil Dunne	6 episodes
2019	Life in Pieces	Mort Short	2 episodes
2019	Merry Happy Whatever	Grandpa Jack	Episode: "Merry Ex-Mas"
2020	Modern Family	Murray	Episode: "Dead on a Rival"
2026	The Comeback	Charlie	Episode: "Valerie's Home Alone"
2027	Cars: Lightning Racers	Sarge	Voice; Upcoming series

=== Video games ===
Year	Title	Role
2006	Cars	Sarge
2007	Cars Mater-National Championship	Sarge
2009	Cars Race-O-Rama	Sarge
2011	Cars 2: The Video Game	Sarge

=== Theatre ===
Year	Title	Role	Notes
1954	The Threepenny Opera	Walt Dreary	
1965	The Odd Couple	Felix Ungar	

=== Theme park attractions ===
Year	Title	Role	Notes
2012	Radiator Springs Racers	Sarge	Voice
