= Pilot (My So-Called Life) =

- My So-Called Life episode
- Patty (Bess Armstrong) comforts her daughter Angela (Claire Danes).
- Episode no.: Season 1 Episode 1
- Directed by: Scott Winant
- Written by: Winnie Holzman
- Production code: 59300
- Original air date: August 25, 1994

Guest appearances
- Nada Despotovich as Ms. Mayhew; Stanley DeSantis as Mr. Demitri

Episode chronology
← Previous —	Next → "Dancing in the Dark"

"Pilot" is the first episode of the American teen drama television series My So-Called Life. The episode premiered on ABC on August 25, 1994. Written by series creator Winnie Holzman and directed by Scott Winant, the episode begins the story of Angela Chase (Claire Danes), a fifteen-year-old high school sophomore who is experiencing the difficulties of friends, boys, and parents. In addition, the pilot also introduces the supporting cast, including Angela's parents, Patty and Graham, her two best friends Rayanne Graff and Rickie Vasquez, and Angela's love interest, Jordan Catalano.

== Synopsis ==
Fifteen-year-old Angela Chase and her best friend Rayanne Graff (A.J. Langer) attempt to swindle money from strangers on the street. Through voiceovers, Angela describes her life and disillusionment with school and friends, revealing that she has recently become close with the free-spirited Rayanne while drifting away from the more conventional friends she's had since childhood. Later, Angela dyes her hair red at the request of Rayanne. After school, Angela brings Rayanne and her other friend Rickie (Wilson Cruz) over to her family's house, where they are met with wariness from Angela's mother, Patty (Bess Armstrong). Angela's distance from her father Graham (Tom Irwin) is also revealed when he mistakenly thinks that Anne Frank is a friend at her school.

The next day, Angela reveals her crush on fellow high school student Jordan Catalano (Jared Leto). Rayanne tells Angela to come to a party because Jordan will be there. In a meeting for the yearbook club, Angela abruptly leaves and says she's not coming back. Her exit is observed by the brainy Brian Krakow (Devon Gummersall), Angela's awkward neighbor who harbors a crush on her. Later, Angela's former best friend Sharon (Devon Odessa) confronts Angela about quitting yearbook in the presence of her parents. A surprised Patty starts to question Angela about it, but she walks out. In class, an English teacher asks a question about Anne Frank, which Angela waywardly responds to by saying Anne was "lucky" because "she was stuck in an attic for three years with this guy she really liked," prompting admonishment from the teacher. Later, the teacher meets with Angela about her academic struggles, asking her if there if something going on that has prompted the changes in her behavior. That night, Angela sneaks out to the party by telling Graham the lie that she's attending a rehearsal for a play.

At the party, a band plays and general chaos ensues as crowds begin to mosh and crowdsurf in the backyard. Angela gets knocked over into a puddle. Going into the house to clean up, she finds Jordan sitting alone on a couch. The two strike up a friendly chat, but it is cut short when Jordan's friends call him away. When Angela comes back home, her parents berate her as she tries to defuse the tension. At lunch the next day, Rayanne invites Angela to a rave that Jordan will be going to. Angela has a run-in with Sharon in the ladies' bathroom where Sharon reveals other kids are spreading rumors about her. Sharon expresses resentment at Angela for ditching their friendship and claims that Rayanne is just "using" her.

At a family dinner, Patty denies Angela's request to sleep over at Rayanne's house, and insults both Rayanne as well as Rickie's bisexuality and his wearing of eyeliner. This results in a heated argument where Angela storms off and leaves for the rave. Outside of her house, she is confronted by Brian, who tells her she is ruining her life, but she persists. Outside the rave, Angela, Rayanne and Rickie wait for unseen character Tino to show and let them in to the event, but he does not. Later, Rayanne and Angela get picked up by two older men, who leave Rickie behind. One of the men calls Rayanne over and attempts to rape her before Angela intervenes. A police officer takes the girls in, making clear he is not arresting them. As Angela gets into the police car, Jordan happens to be passing by and recognizes her, calling out her name before the car door is closed. The car stops over at Rayanne's house, and Angela notices that no one is home.

On the drive back to her house, Angela relates a deep insight about Anne Frank's The Diary of a Young Girl to the police officer. She convinces the officer to not escort her to the front door, but Brian sees her come out of the policeman's car and attempts to pry the truth out of her. As they talk, Angela spots her father with another woman. Angela reconciles with Patty after apologizing to her and breaking down in tears. The next day at school, Angela talks with Jordan intimately for the first time, and she smiles.

== Production ==
=== Casting ===
Although Claire Danes eventually landed the role of Angela Chase, several other actresses almost played the character instead. Alicia Silverstone, who was unknown at the time, was in talks to play the role, but it was eventually decided that the actress was "too pretty" to play Angela. In addition, A.J. Langer, who ended up portraying Rayanne Graff, also auditioned for Angela. However, it was eventually decided that Claire Danes was better at playing an awkward teenager character. Because Danes was thirteen years old at the time (and had to attend school), the show's producers, Edward Zwick and Marshall Herskovitz increased the amount of screen time for Angela's parents.

In addition, Jared Leto almost decided not to take the role of Jordan Catalano. The actor was not very interested in acting at the time and wanted to go to art school instead.

=== Filming ===
The episode was filmed on location at University High School in Los Angeles, CA. The pilot was written by series creator Winnie Holzman and directed by Scott Winant. During filming, Holzman changed the status of Jared Leto's character Jordan Catalano. Originally, he was only supposed to appear in the first episode, but after Holzman saw Leto's acting skills, she wanted to keep him as a series regular. Holzman said, "As soon as we got Jared on film, we knew he had to be a continuing character."

== Reception ==
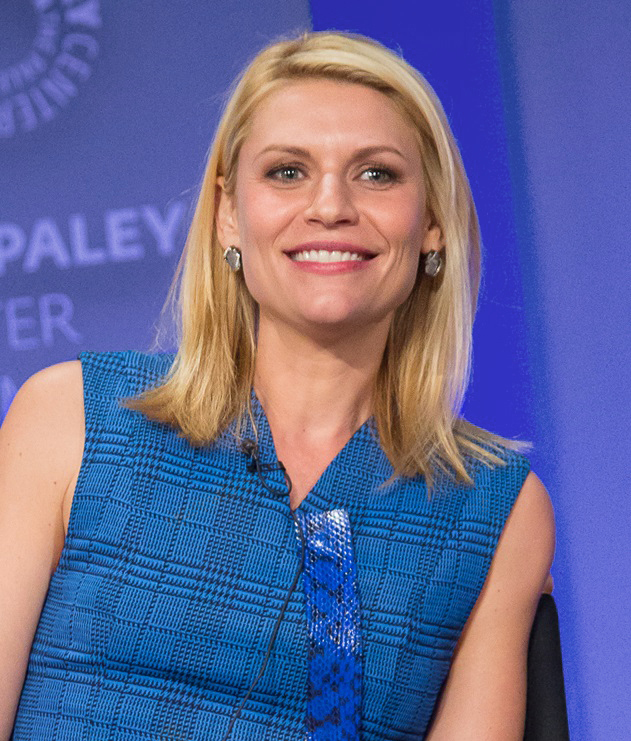
The performance of Claire Danes (pictured) as Angela was critically acclaimed.

Emma Fraser and Julie Hammerle of This Was TV praised the episode, including the complex portrayal of Angela's parents and the device of the voiceovers. "The things that best sum up Angela and her melodramatic teen philosophy is the voiceover…as a device in the pilot it's one I am on board with." In addition, the pair praised Danes' performance—"Claire Danes is one of the best criers on TV, back then and now, and she isn't afraid to go to the full 'ugly' scrunched up crying face. Both the scene with Sharon in the bathroom and with Patty at the end kills me."

Amelie Gillette of The A.V. Club gave the episode a B+. While she criticized some aspects of the episode, the reviewer lauded it in general while stating that it was better than other, more popular teen television shows. "Not many teen dramas attempt to capture what it's like to be a teenager without the filter of nostalgia (The Wonder Years, Freaks and Geeks), or exaggerated elements like excessive wealth (The O.C., Gossip Girl), or cartoony, soapy elements (90210). My So-Called Life, however, did, and it usually did it very well."
