= Huge (TV series) =

American teen drama television series

- Promotional poster
- Genre: Teen drama
- Based on: Huge by Sasha Paley
- Developed by: Winnie Holzman; Savannah Dooley
- Starring: Nikki Blonsky; Zander Eckhouse; Raven Goodwin; Harvey Guillen; Hayley Hasselhoff; Ashley Holliday; Ari Stidham; Gina Torres
- Theme music composer: W. G. Snuffy Walden; Will Walden
- Country of origin: United States
- Original language: English
- No. of seasons: 1
- No. of episodes: 10

Production
- Executive producers: Winnie Holzman; Kim Rozenfeld; Leslie Morgenstein; Bob Levy
- Producers: Savannah Dooley; Dan Dugan; David Hartle
- Running time: 44 minutes
- Production companies: Dooley & Company Productions; Half Full Entertainment; Alloy Entertainment

Original release
- Network: ABC Family
- Release: June 28 – August 30, 2010

Huge is an American teen drama television series that aired on ABC Family. The series is based on the young adult novel series of the same name by Sasha Paley. The hour-long drama series revolves around eight teens sent to a summer weight loss camp called Camp Victory. Winnie Holzman (creator of My So-Called Life) and her daughter Savannah Dooley wrote the plot.

Casting began in January, with production beginning in April 2010. The series premiered on June 28, 2010, at 9 p.m. with 2.53 million viewers. On October 4, 2010, ABC Family announced that Huge was not getting an extra episode order, therefore canceling the show.

== Cast and characters ==
- Nikki Blonsky as Willamena ("Will") Rader – Sardonic and opinionated, she resents being sent to fat camp by her parents. She thinks that "fat camp" teaches campers to hate their bodies, and rather than hate her extra weight, she'd rather embrace it. She's regularly rude and sarcastic, but through her relationship with Becca and Ian, she shows more of a softer side. She has a crush on Ian and was angry after he read a page in her journal and composed a song based on a poem he saw in it. She is jealous of Ian's crush on Amber as she feels no one will love her because of her obesity. Will's parents own the fictional lifestyle health club chain, CORE.
- Hayley Hasselhoff as Amber – Although she is the least fat girl at fat camp, she is still determined to lose weight. Although she is usually even-tempered and nice to others, she can have a mean streak (most often seen when she's interacting with Will). Her mother is co-dependent and immature, resulting in Amber taking on more of a maternal role in that relationship. She has paid for the camp with her own savings. Amber becomes friends with Chloe at camp and soon falls for George, a college-age counselor. In the 6th episode, Amber and George share their first kiss. In the seventh episode she and George start a secret relationship together, which he ends quickly.
- Raven Goodwin as Becca Huffstatter – A painfully shy bookworm who befriends Will. Their relationship helps Becca gain confidence in herself. She reads constantly and is interested in geek-like subjects such as LARPing and runes. She secretly read Will's journal and is aware of Will's crush on Ian. She used to be best friends with Chloe.
- Ari Stidham as Ian Schonfeld – An awkward musician who connects with Will over music. He has said that he hated all of his music until the song he wrote with Will's words. He's often sarcastic, but can also be very awkward (mostly when he's with Amber). During Parent Week, his parents tell him that they are filing for a divorce.
- Ashley Holliday as Chloe Delgado – Once close friends with the shy Becca, she seeks after popularity, and dropped Becca for the popular crowd. This is her second year at Camp Victory. She is dating Trent. She and Alistair are twins, although that fact is not common knowledge among the campers until Dr. Rand reveals it before parents day. The summer before the session shown in the series, she was found in a popular boy's sleeping bag during Movie Night, presumably after they'd had sex. No campers aside from Alistair know this, however.
- Harvey Guillén as Alistair Delgado – An oddball, often mocked and excluded by other campers, he lives in his own world. He frequently mentions his preferences for more "girly" things – during Spirit Quest, he chose the name Athena and he mentioned in episode eight that his sister got all of the toys he wanted, referencing a set of dolls. It was revealed in episode 2 that Alistair is Chloe's brother, a fact she wants to keep secret. In episode 6, Alistair reveals to Trent that not only are he and Chloe siblings, they're twins.
- Stefan Van Ray as Trent – A jock who lost his mother several years earlier. He's also one of the only people in the camp to know Chloe and Alistair are twins. He likes to jam with Ian, even though he can only barely play the drums, and he's dating Chloe. Though he seems like a typical jock, he sometimes goes outside of his image, such as when he bonded with Alistair.
- Jacob Wysocki as Dante Piznarski – Trent's mischievous buddy. His first name is not known until Dr. Rand reveals it during a discussion on the morning of Parents Day.
- Gina Torres as Dr. Dorothy Rand – The well-intentioned but stern camp director. Her father is Salty. She is grappling with food-related issues, and is a member of Overeaters Anonymous. She is often very awkward around other people, and she isn't very good at personal relationships.
- Zander Eckhouse as George – A handsome camp counselor that the girls swoon over. He is the assistant coach, and Shay's assistant. He shows signs of jealousy when Trent shows interest in Amber. In the 6th episode, Amber and George share their first kiss.
- Zoe Jarman as Poppy – The girls' ever-cheerful, fairy-like counselor. She is often very supportive and protective of both the girls she watches over and the rest of the campers as well. She is asexual. She was once overweight and attended Camp Victory herself.
- Paul Dooley as Joe "Salty" Sosniak – The Camp Victory chef and Dr. Rand's father. He has a poker face, so his emotions don't show well, and he can often be blunt. He has a tattoo with the name Joyce on his shoulder, and he gambled in the past. He walked out on Dr. Rand and her mother when Dr. Rand was 11 years old. His catchphrase is "No Seconds".
- Tia Texada as Shay – The trainer at Camp Victory. She appears to be a parody of Jillian Michaels, attempting to get through to the kids by screaming and harassing them. She has a daughter named Roxy.

== Episodes ==
No.	Title	Directed by	Written by	Original release date	U.S. viewers (millions)
1	"Hello, I Must Be Going"	Allison Liddi-Brown	Teleplay by : Savannah Dooley & Winnie Holzman	June 28, 2010	2.53
The campers arrive at Camp Victory and Will is less than thrilled about being there. To spite her parents, Will decides to try to gain weight while there, and she sells fatty treats to the other campers until one of them, Caitlin, is sent home for being caught trying to vomit the food she bought from Will. Will and Amber clash and Will pulls a mean prank on her, thinking Amber told on her about selling the treats. Meanwhile, Amber is smitten with George, the new camp counselor. Will tries to run away to her uncle's, but is found by Dr. Rand. By the end of the episode, Will indicates she is willing to give Camp Victory a chance.
2	"Letters Home"	Ron Lagomarsino	Gayle Abrams	July 5, 2010	2.14
Will continually puts off writing her first letter home, even though her parents sent an e-mail to Dr. Rand requesting that she tell Will to write a letter home. Dr. Rand has trouble writing an e-mail to her mother telling her that her dad is at camp, working for her. Meanwhile, George begins to show his feelings for Amber, allowing her to use his cell phone to call home after pulling her out of the line for the pay phone. A new camper, Danielle, who replaces Caitlin, arrives with a very involved family. Will takes up basketball after finding motivation when she makes a basket during a game, and takes some tips on the game from Dr. Rand's father. Danielle ends up having a panic attack due to her missing her family when they eventually leave after a two-day stay, and she is pulled from the camp.
3	"Live Action Role Play"	Michael Grossman	Savannah Dooley & Winnie Holzman	July 12, 2010	1.89
Becca arranges a LARPing event (a Live action role-playing game) with the other campers, but the setting she believes is perfect for the game is a clearing claimed, rudely, by normal-weight kids Brad (Daniel Romer) and Meredith (Ellen Wroe) from a nearby tennis camp. The tennis group includes a boy who knows Will from – and has bullied her at – school. When Dr. Rand informs Becca that the clearing is off limits due to an unsafe building nearby, Becca (wanting to follow the rules) decides to have it somewhere else; she is overruled by Will, who is excited about both the event and the chance to claim the clearing in the face of the tennis campers' hostility. Becca, hurt by Will's unthinking take-over of her activity, decides to sit out the LARP, but eventually changes her mind and arrives at the clearing just in time to lead the Camp Victory campers in rebellion against the tennis campers, who have mistaken Amber for one of their own. Meanwhile, Ian deals with the pressure of having to tell Alistair about his bad odor and Amber and Chloe argue over Trent.
4	"Talent Night"	Eric Stoltz	Winnie Holzman	July 19, 2010	1.48
The annual talent show comes around and the campers prepare for their routines. Amber and Chloe decide to do a dance routine to the song "Baby Got Back," Ian wants to perform a song, Will wants to do an imitation of Dr. Rand (which Dr. Rand is aware of, and not hostile to), and Alistair prepares to do magic after being excluded from a satirical reality-show sketch being put on by others from his cabin. Meanwhile, Will panics after she loses her camp journal, which Becca finds and secretly reads. Ian also reads poems from the journal and, inspired, he uses one as material for the song he performs in the talent show. Wayne, a property surveyor hired by the tennis camp, inspects the area where the LARPing incident took place. He concludes that the area belongs to Camp Victory, but that Dr. Rand must post "No Trespassing" signs in order to prevent others from going there. He shows an interest in Dr. Rand, finds some old "No Trespassing" signs, pounds them into the ground for her, and stays for the talent show. Amber and Chloe end up not taking the stage after fighting shortly before they are due to dance; instead, Becca jumps up and, surprising herself as much as anyone, performs an impromptu dance routine to their music.
5	"Movie Night"	Elodie Keene	Andy Reaser	July 26, 2010	1.58
The staff of Camp Victory prepares for the annual Movie Night, with a new policy prohibiting sleeping bags after an incident the previous year. The full details of the incident are not fully disclosed to the viewer, but it involved sexual intercourse in a sleeping bag. Dr. Rand is reluctant to give details, and a confused George tries to find out more about the incident. Will is still upset at Ian for reading her journal; he constantly tells her that he only read one page for material for his song. They finally settle things as Will agrees to help him write his next song. Meanwhile, George is confused about his feelings for Amber, because he does not want to jeopardize his job. The campers must select a movie to watch; they choose Phantasma (a parody of Twilight). It creates romantic feelings among the campers, with some making out during the movie. After Dr. Rand asks him for a recommendation for a fence installer, Wayne returns to Camp Victory, and installs a cyclone fence, along with buying a copy of Phantasma for her to show. We learn that Wayne is divorced and Dr. Rand eventually realizes that he is interested in her. After she confronts him about it, he tells her he left an invoice for the fence work at her office. She finds the invoice, along with a flower, in the envelope. She drops the flower to the ground, where George finds it and gives it to Amber.
6	"Spirit Quest"	Patrick Norris	Jan Oxenberg	August 2, 2010	1.36
The episode starts with a church service being conducted by Dr. Rand. While the campers are singing "This Little Light of Mine," Salty comes in and informs Dr. Rand that Shay, the head trainer, has had a family emergency and needs to leave camp immediately. Poppy takes over the service as Dr. Rand attends to the matter. She calls George into her office; he thinks that he is in trouble. But Dr. Rand instead offers him a chance to lead the camp's annual "Spirit Quest" (a camping trip with spiritual bonding activities) per Shay's recommendations. George is surprised that he has been asked to lead the Spirit Quest, being the newest staff member, and after some hesitation, takes the position. He tells Poppy, who is jealous that she was not selected. Poppy then tells George that she was once overweight and a camper at Camp Victory. Dr. Rand gives Poppy a cell phone to use in case of an emergency during the Spirit Quest. While camping, each camper is assigned a buddy. Will is assigned to Amber and Chloe is assigned to Becca. Becca has a flashback of last year, when they were much closer. George drops his instructions from Shay into the river, but Poppy tells him not to pick them up and let his spirit guide the way. When Amber needs to use the restroom, Poppy tells her buddy, Will, to go with her. They travel too far away from camp and end up getting lost in the forest. Eventually, the two split up after an argument on how to find their way back. Amber finds George and the two kiss. They then go and find Will. Back at camp, Wayne comes back to finish the fence. Dr. Rand starts to show interest in him, and the two go on a date.
7	"Poker Face"	Wendey Stanzler	Robert L. Freedman	August 9, 2010	1.41
Shay returns from her temporary leave and tells the other camp counselors that her daughter had meningitis, but she's doing fine now. Dr. Rand is offended; she has worked with Shay for four years and she never mentioned a daughter. The campers prepare the second weigh-in for the summer and Will couldn't care less about it, while Amber desperately wants to shed a few pounds. When the results come in, Amber is upset that she only lost one pound and Will is annoyed that everyone is concerned about weight loss. George sees Amber crying and comforts her and they kiss; Will sees them kissing. Also, Dr. Rand has her first argument with her father, Joe (Salty), since he started working there, about playing poker with the campers and Dr. Rand's painful childhood memories. Dr. Rand also confronts him about a tattoo she saw on his arm: the name "Joyce" enclosed in a heart. Dr. Rand has never heard of Joyce. Shay is seen at the end of the episode crying by the camp's pay phone shortly after hanging it up.
8	"Birthdays"	Elodie Keene	Lucy Boyle	August 16, 2010	1.34
It is Chloe and Alistair’s birthday—each plans a separate celebration for himself, because the siblings are not talking to each other. Meanwhile, Will and Becca plan to use runes during the night to learn about their futures. Later, during Chloe’s party, Amber provides alcohol that she had stolen from Poppy’s stash, and they get drunk and play a game of Truth or Dare. Piznarski is challenged to go and kiss Alistair, whom the others suspect is gay. The move shocks and hurts Alistair, and Chloe gets mad at Trent and her friends for the prank. Amber returns drunk and embarrassed to her cabin to find Will there. Will helps Amber recover, but misses the rune ritual she’d planned with Becca. Dr. Rand has a heartfelt talk with Wayne, but she later sleeps with someone else, Jonathan. The next day, Ian checks on Alistair to see how he is feeling, surprised to find that Alistair has forgiven Trent. It is hinted that Alistair has a crush on him. George and Amber had plans to meet secretly in the woods at dawn, but by the end of the episode he hasn't come and has ended things with her, leaving her heartbroken.
9	"Parents Weekend (Part 1)"	Dan Lerner	Gayle Abrams	August 23, 2010	1.47
The camp hosts parents' weekend, but Will's parents are no-shows. Alistair puts on a charade of being Becca's boyfriend and invites Becca to dinner with his family. Trent is afraid to tell his parents that he is dating Chloe, and Amber's mother smuggles in cookies, which Amber later hides in the laundry room. Ian is caught off-guard by his parents being nice to each other for once; he is then told that they are getting a divorce. Ian finds the cookies that Amber hid and gives them to Dr. Rand. Still feeling guilty about sleeping with Jonathan, Dr. Rand thinks about eating the cookies herself, but then finally gives them to Wayne. The episode ends with Amber asking Will to find her junk-food stash in the woods. To be continued...
10	"Parents Weekend (Part 2)"	Elodie Keene	Savannah Dooley	August 30, 2010	1.45
Parents' weekend continues. Will and Amber sneak into the kitchen and steal brownies. George sees them walking back to the cabin after they should have been in bed. Salty has to leave to take care of his other daughter, 15-year-old Violet, whom Dr. Rand did not know about. She gets upset, thinking he has abandoned her again. Trent has a hard time with his stepmother's being around, and Chloe is hurt that his parents don't know about her. Will, Ian, and Trent play a song for everyone, and Trent finally kisses Chloe afterwards to show his parents who his girlfriend is. Alistair tells Piznarski that he is not dwelling on the prank. As parents are leaving, Amber sees George connecting with Carter's sister and starts crying and runs off. Ian follows her; they talk, kiss, and show up to the campfire holding hands, which breaks Will's and George's hearts. The episode ends with Will and Dr. Rand having a conversation about Dr. Rand's reward from losing weight: hating herself a little less than before.

== U.S. Nielsen ratings ==
The following is a table with the average estimated number of viewers per episode of the only season of Huge on ABC Family.

Season	Timeslot (ET/PT)	# Ep.	Premiered		Ended		TV Season	Viewers (in millions)
Season	Timeslot (ET/PT)	# Ep.	Date	Premiere Viewers (in millions)	Date	Finale Viewers (in millions)	TV Season	Viewers (in millions)
Season 1	Monday 9PM	10	June 28, 2010	2.53	August 30, 2010	1.45	2010	1.66

== Home media ==
The complete series was released on DVD on February 22, 2011, via Shout! Factory.
