= Strip Mall =

- Julie Brown as Tammi Tyler
- Created by: Julie Brown; Charlie Coffey
- Developed by: Julie Brown; Charlie Coffey; Fax Bahr; Adam Small
- Starring: Julie Brown; Victoria Jackson; Jim O'Heir; Bob Koherr; Juan Vidal; Amy Hill; Loretta Fox; Tim Bagley; Jonathan Mangum; Chris Wylde; Allison Dunbar
- Theme music composer: Greg O'Connor
- Composer: Christopher Tyng
- Country of origin: United States
- Original language: English
- No. of seasons: 2
- No. of episodes: 20

Production
- Executive producers: Julie Brown; Charlie Coffey; Fax Bahr; Adam Small
- Producer: Emily Wolfe
- Running time: 22 minutes
- Production companies: Bahr/Small Productions; Big Ticket Television; Comedy Partners

Original release
- Network: Comedy Central
- Release: June 18, 2000 – March 11, 2001

Strip Mall is a sitcom that aired on Comedy Central from June 2000 until March 2001.

The series, a parody of prime time soap operas, was set in Van Nuys, California, which is series star/creator/executive producer Julie Brown's hometown. The titular "Strip Mall" was the fictional Plaza del Toro. Brown starred as Tammi Tyler, an ex-child actress who at 12 had stabbed her adult co-star to death after eating a cupcake laced with PCP. Now, as an adult, Tammi worked as a waitress at the Funky Fox, a bar located in the Plaza del Toro. One of her fellow employees was Patti the barmaid (Victoria Jackson). In the series premiere, Tammi married the owner of Starbrite Cleaners, Harvey Krudup (Jim O'Heir), who she thought was worth millions, but realized that Starbrite's lone location was at the Plaza. For the rest of the show's run, Tammi would try (unsuccessfully) to end her marriage.

== Other businesses and main characters ==
Other businesses at the Plaza del Toro included a Chinese restaurant, Wok Don't Run, owned by Fanny Sue Chang (Amy Hill) and Althea (Loretta Fox), both of whom were lesbians; the Good Things gift shop, owned by Rafe (Maxwell Caulfield) and Bettina Bellingham (Eliza Coyle); and We Shoot You Video, which employed two college film graduates Barry (Chris Wylde) and Josh Macintosh (Jonathan Mangum), as well as a porn actress named Hedda Hummer (Allison Dunbar). There was also an insurance agency near the plaza, run by an agent named Dwight (Tim Bagley).

Bob Koherr, who had directed Brown in the 1997 movie Plump Fiction, played a biker named Blank and his identical brothers Blair and Blunt. Juan Vidal played Tammi's Latin lover, Fernando, in Season 2. Former Miss Alabama Kim Wimmer played Elyce Cantwell.

== Episodes ==
=== Season 1 ===
1. Blunt's Bad Idea
2. Tammi Settles Down
3. Harve Takes a Bullet
4. Rafe Gets Stiffed
5. Burbank Bigfoot
6. Barry's Big Surprise
7. Tammi Baby-sits
8. Mommy Dearest
9. Tammi's Little Problem
10. Big Hanger

=== Season 2 ===
1. Whatever Happened to Tammi Tyler?
2. Fun With Fernando
3. Barry Boinks Caroline
4. Psycho-Vivor
5. Hungry and Homeless
6. The Judge is Free
7. Hedda Bags Josh
8. Elyce's Baby Blues
9. Tammi Wins Fernando
10. Tammi Takes a Dive

== On the set ==
All twenty episodes of this series were written by the same writers. In addition to Brown and Koherr, episodes of the series were directed by Alan Cohn; Sam Irvin (who also directed Brown in Out There and Fat Rose and Squeaky); and Bobcat Goldthwait (the latter previously worked with Brown in Medusa: Dare to Be Truthful and Shakes the Clown). Frequent guest stars on the series included Stella Stevens, one of several actresses to play Harvey's mom, and Cindy Williams—like Brown, a Van Nuys native—who played herself in several episodes. Many of the behind-the-scenes crew came from Brown's previous series, Clueless, which was also set in the Los Angeles area.

Every episode of this series ended with a cliffhanger. The final episode ended with Tammi being thrown from an airplane by Dwight, who yelled, "Goodbye, Tammi Tyler!" Brown, along with Charlie Coffey produced Strip Mall, was about to plan the series' third season when Comedy Central decided to cancel the series because, given the recession at the time, it was too expensive to continue. Strip Mall was one of two Comedy Central sitcoms cancelled in June 2001 due to cost reasons; the other was That's My Bush!
