= Rock 'n' Wrestling =

Rock 'n' Wrestling may refer to:

- 1980s professional wrestling boom, a surge in popularity of American professional wrestling
- Hulk Hogan's Rock 'n' Wrestling, an American animated television series
