= Medusa: Dare to Be Truthful =

1991 film

- Promotional poster
- Written by: Julie Brown; Charlie Coffey
- Directed by: Julie Brown; John Fortenberry
- Starring: Julie Brown; Bobcat Goldthwait; Carol Leifer; Wink Martindale; Chris Elliott; Kathy Griffin; Tom Kenny; Donal Logue; Stanley DeSantis
- Music by: Julie Brown; Charlie Coffey
- Country of origin: United States
- Original language: English

Production
- Executive producer: Julie Brown
- Editor: Vic Lowrey
- Running time: 51 minutes

Original release
- Release: December 1, 1991

Medusa: Dare to Be Truthful is an American 1991 mockumentary film starring comedian Julie Brown as the title character, with Kathy Griffin and Donal Logue in supporting roles. Comedians Tom Kenny and Bobcat Goldthwait and game show host Wink Martindale also made cameo appearances in the film.

== Background ==
The film parodies the documentary Madonna: Truth or Dare (also known as In Bed with Madonna outside the United States and Canada). In the original, American singer Madonna allowed cameras to follow her around for a no-holds-barred peek into her life during her Blond Ambition World Tour. In this spoof, Brown plays Medusa, a controlling, hyper-sexual blonde bombshell who has allowed a documentary crew to follow her on her Blonde Leading the Blonde Tour. The film, about one hour long and originally produced as a Showtime television special, goes to great pains to recreate costumes, sets and situations that occurred in the original documentary.

== Plot ==
The film begins with the camera panning through pictures of Medusa's album covers and film posters eventually showing her lying in a bed while getting a massage and her hair done. She starts telling the viewers about how lonely she feels since her tour ended.

The film then flashes back to when Medusa was rehearsing her Blonde Leading the Blonde Tour. After being crushed by a giant genitalia statue, Medusa explains in a voice-over how the tour was a technical nightmare.

Eventually, the tour begins in the Philippines, only for Medusa to find out that she was performing during the eruption of a volcano. In an interview, Medusa's manager Benny explains how Medusa's first single "Like a Video" ("Like a Virgin") was a hit for MTV, leading into a parody performance of Madonna's Blond Ambition version. After that, Medusa is shown talking to her boyfriend and seducing the cameraman.

The tour then moves to Japan, where Medusa tells her poverty stricken dancers that they'll be receiving a pay cut. Another shows women protesting Medusa and her director showing how Medusa gained the inspiration to shoot a music video involving robbing a store.

Finally, the tour moves to the United States where Medusa and her dancers play a game of Truth or Dare. After that, she is shown being at a party where a director who tries to get her to star in a movie similar to "Heidi". Later, while Medusa is listing negative things about people, Bobcat Goldthwait shows up and gets offended when he sees Medusa gag after he called her show "neat".

After that, Medusa is shown reciting lines from "Romeo and Juliet " while a voice-over explains that Medusa is planning to star in the Broadway show after the tour, and that her ex- husband Shane Pencil was helping her, but Shane gets fed up with Medusa and he leaves. Another voice-over during one of Medusa's show explains her she almost died during "Expose Yourself" ("Express Yourself") as she got electrocuted. After that, Medusa is shown visiting her dog's grave, only to find out she was at the wrong grave (parodying the "Promise to Try" scene in Truth or Dare where Madonna visits her mother's grave).

While in Atlanta, Police Officers show up and explain that Medusa will be arrested if she shows her "muffin". Medusa performs "Party in My Pants" and "Vague" ("Like a Prayer", "Into the Groove", and "Vogue"). Medusa then goes to the officers to get arrested only for them to ask her for an autograph.

Finally, the tour finishes in New York and while Medusa is saying goodbye to the dancers, it is revealed that Medusa was viewing the footage while trying to find an ending. She ends up in the hospital to get a toy dino removed while a montage of clips plays with "Life May End" ("Live to Tell"). The dancers come to visit her, and the film ends with them trying to sleep.

== Critical reception ==
In an interview with celebrity columnist Michael Musto of The Village Voice, Brown recalled how Madonna first reacted when she saw the film: "At first I heard she really liked it. Then I heard she didn't like the scene where I rolled around on my dog's grave. She'd rolled around on her mother's — like that wasn't offensive enough? Then she didn't like the scene with the dancers suing me, because that really happened to her".

Shortly after seeing the film, Madonna sent over a half-finished bottle of warm champagne as a dubious gift, to salute Brown's deadpan impersonation. Brown's reaction upon receiving the gift was surprising: "It was really expensive champagne, but it had Madonna spit in it!"

The concert and backstage footage was filmed at the Long Beach Convention and Entertainment Center in Long Beach, California. After its debut on cable television, the film was released on VHS for a limited time until it went out-of-print in the mid-1990s. The DVD version of the film is now available only via Julie Brown's official website.

== Cast ==
- Julie Brown as Medusa
- Chris Elliott as Andy
- Bobcat Goldthwait as himself
- Tom Kenny as Bobo Koffman
- Carol Leifer as Angry Mom
- Wink Martindale as himself
- Stanley DeSantis as Bennie
- Charlie Coffey as Jeff
- Thomas Halstead as Stinky
- Kathy Griffin as Taffy
- Smith Wordes as Angel
- Moses Sequeira as Raoul
- Sergio Carbajal as Dunky
- David Mirkin as Fired Dancer
- Leah Krinsky as Sarah
- Donal Logue as Shane Pencil
- Sharonlee McLean as Myrna
- Jodi Carlisle as Aphrodite

== Books ==
- Collum, Jason Paul. Assault of the Killer B's. Pg 167.
