= Dr. Hackenstein =

- VHS cover for 'Dr. Hackenstein'
- Directed by: Richard Clark
- Written by: Richard Clark
- Produced by: Megan Barnett; Jerry Feifer; Jim Hanson; Tony Miller; Renza Mizbani
- Starring: David Muir; Michael Ensign; Cathy Cahn; Stacey Travis; Anne Ramsey; Logan Ramsey
- Cinematography: Jens Sturup
- Edited by: Tony Miller
- Music by: Randy Miller
- Distributed by: Troma Entertainment
- Release date: 1988
- Running time: 87 minutes
- Language: English

Dr. Hackenstein is a 1988 comedy horror film, written and directed by Richard Clark and distributed by Troma Entertainment.

== Plot ==
After the death of his wife, the widower Dr. Hackenstein (David Muir) concocts the perfect plan: with the help of a few graverobbers and a couple of lost girls, he can use the spare parts to reanimate his dead spouse and build a better woman.

== Casting ==
Comedian Phyllis Diller has a small part in the film, along with Oscar nominee Anne Ramsey (d. 1988) in her last role.

== Release ==
It was shown at Cannes Film Festival in May, 1989, having been released on home video in January. Shooting was comparatively swift, principal photography having begun in May the previous year. It was given a commercial re-release fifteen years later (2004), on DVD format.

== Sources used ==
The film's visible contemporary influences include Re-Animator and Young Frankenstein. Critic Sandra Brennan characterized it as a parody of the "Frankenstein" films. Identifying it as "among the first films to blend pure gore with slapstick comedy", Rotten Tomatoes deemed it a precursor and trendsetter to later films, such as Scary Movie, which draw on those genres.

== Reception ==
DVD Verdict columnist David Johnson, though singling out production values as impressive within its low-budget class, found the gore–comedy outing failed to succeed on either count. Bill Gibron of DVD Talk wrote similarly unenthusiastically that its flashes of wit and effective segments notwithstanding, the romance and physical humor plot elements were ineffective, ultimately concluding it lay "somewhere in the middle between complete piece of crap and pretty cool comedy".
