= Daniel Romer =

American actor

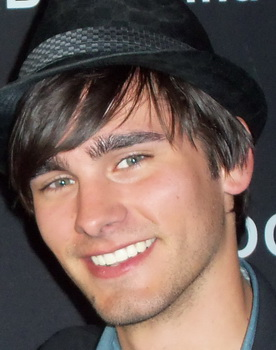
- Born: April 29, 1990 (age 36); Las Vegas, Nevada, U.S.
- Years active: 2008-2016 (acting); 2006- (modeling)

Daniel Romer a.k.a. Danny Romer (born April 1990, Las Vegas, Nevada) is an American actor and model. He has several international modeling campaigns to his name. He is known for his role in The Young and the Restless as Kieran Donnally, the law school drop-out turned drug dealer; and as Marcus "Mark" Anderson, a street photographer within the world of fashion blogging in Lookbook - The Series. Romer was cast as Joe in a written for TV Pilot, that was filmed in Italy. He played the bully Brad, a tennis camp kid, opposite Nikki Blonsky and Hayley Hasselhoff in the ABC Family series Huge. As Trumbull in Supah Ninjas Romer pays homage to the rebellious character John Bender, made famous by Judd Nelson in The Breakfast Club. Romer's first job came after only being in Los Angeles for 45-days. He portrayed a modern-day Prince Charming in Emily Osment's music video, a remake of the song Once Upon A Dream from Disney's Sleeping Beauty. Thereafter, he went on to host several of Disney's "Get Connected" Intersistial shows which appeared on the Disney Channel as well as on the web. His last screen role was a brief appearance was a 2016 episode of Mercy Street.

== Filmography ==
=== Television ===
- Comic Relief USA (2006)
- Disney's Get Connected (Host, 6 episodes, 2009)
- MDA Telethon (2007-2011)
- Huge (Guest Star, 1 episode, 2010)
- Supah Ninjas (Co-Star, 1 episode, 2011)
- Castle (Co-Star,1 episode, 2012)
- The Young and the Restless (Co-Star, recurring, 2012 – 2013)
- Lookbook (Lead, 8 episodes, 2013)
- Upstairs (Lead, pilot, not picked up, 2013)
- Mercy Street (1 episode, 2016)

=== Videos ===
- Emily Osment - "Once Upon A Dream" (2008). Lead male, as Prince Charming.
- Rascal Flatts - "Summer Nights" (2009). Featured.
- Victoria Justice - "Best Friend's Brother" (2011). Lead male, as the best friend's brother.
- Katy Perry - "Last Friday Night (T.G.I.F.)" (2012). Supporting.
