= Stacey Travis =

American actress

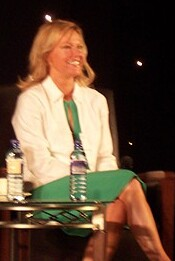
- Travis in 2005
- Born: Dallas, Texas, U.S.
- Occupation: Actress
- Years active: 1988–present
- Known for: Hardware; Just Say Julie

Stacey Travis is an American actress. She has appeared in films Hardware (1990), The Super (1991), Only the Strong (1993), Traffic (2000), Ghost World (2001), Bandits (2001) and Intolerable Cruelty (2003).

== Life and career ==
Travis began her career appearing in low-budget comedies and genre films include, Phantasm II, Dr. Hackenstein and Earth Girls Are Easy (1988). From 1989 to 1992, she was regular cast member in the MTV comedy series, Just Say Julie where she played a variety of characters.

In 1990, Travis played a female leading role in the science fiction horror film Hardware opposite Dylan McDermott. She next starred in the comedy film The Super (1991) and martial arts film Only the Strong (1993) opposite Mark Dacascos. The following years, Travis played supporting roles in many films, include Mystery Men (1999), Traffic (2000), Ghost World (2001), Bandits (2001), Intolerable Cruelty (2003), Venom (2005), and Easy A (2010). In later years she starred in a direct-to-video sequel to the 1983 film A Christmas Story, A Christmas Story 2 (2012), and the supernatural horror film The Manor (2021).

On television, Travis has made more than 50 appearances. She appeared in a season 7 episode of Seinfeld as Holly, Elaine's cousin and Jerry's current love interest. She had a recurring role in Highlander: The Series as Renee Delaney in the season 2 episodes "Unholy Alliance" Part 1 and Part 2, returning in season 4 in the episode "Double Jeopardy". In 1998, she starred on the short-lived UPN comedy series, Love Boat: The Next Wave as Cruise Director Suzanne Zimmerman. She had a recurring role as Jordana Geist, Lynette’s friend in the Desperate Housewives. Her other guest-starring credits include Picket Fences, Dream On, ER, Diagnosis Murder, Touched by an Angel, Dharma & Greg, The Practice, Frasier, Angel, The Big Bang Theory, Modern Family, Mom and S.W.A.T..

== Filmography ==
=== Film ===
Year	Title	Role
1988	Phantasm II	Jeri
1988	Earth Girls Are Easy	Tammy
1988	Deadly Dreams	The Librarian
1988	Dr. Hackenstein	Melanie Victor
1990	Hardware	Jill
1991	The Super	Heather
1993	Dracula Rising	Theresa
1993	Only the Strong	Dianna
1994	Caroline at Midnight	Christine Jenkins
1997	The Only Thrill	Lola Jennings
1997	Playing God	Nurse
1999	Mystery Men	Powerwoman
1999	The Muse	Phyllis
2000	What Planet Are You From?	Woman
2000	Submerged	Cindy Kenner
2000	Sleep Easy, Hutch Rimes	Rachel Rimes
2000	Traffic	Helena's Friend
2001	Heartbreakers	Nurse Gale Gray (uncredited)
2001	Ghost World	Dana
2001	Bandits	Cloe Miller
2003	Two Days	Nancy
2003	Intolerable Cruelty	Bonnie Donaly
2004	Soul Plane	Flight Attendant
2005	Venom	Laura
2005	Fun with Dick and Jane	Jack's Receptionist
2006	Art School Confidential	Teacher
2008	The Great Buck Howard	Cindy Crown
2010	Easy A	Marianne's Mom
2011	Son of Morning	Laurel
2011	Satin	Rowanne Sexton
2012	A Christmas Story 2	Mrs. Parker
2013	Deep Dark Canyon	Melanie Cavanaugh
2013	Random Encounters	Dr. Colleen Sanders
2015	Dark Seduction	Laura
2018	A Talent for Trouble	Bonnie Mulraye
2021	The Manor	Ms. Benson

=== Television ===
Year	Title	Role	Notes
1989	Just Say Julie	Various Roles	
1992	Picket Fences	Suzanne	Episode: "Thanksgiving"
1995	Seinfeld	Holly	Episode: "The Wink"
1995	Dream On	Lisbett	Episode: "Home Is Where the Cart Is"
1996	The Naked Truth	Sister Katherine O'Farrell	Episode: "Woman Loses Space Alien, Finds God"
1996	Chicago Hope	Vanessa Hart	Episode: "Divided Loyalty"
1994–1997	Highlander: The Series	Renee Delaney	3 episodes
1997	Mad About You	Dawn	Episode: "On the Road"
1997	Lois & Clark: The New Adventures of Superman	Wendy	Episode: "Toy Story"
1997–1998	ER	Detective Weller	2 episodes
1998	Love Boat: The Next Wave	Suzanne Zimmerman	3 episodes
1998	Diagnosis Murder	Denise Garrett	Episode: "Till Death Do Us Part"
1999	Fantasy Island	Linda	Episode: "Heroes"
1999	Touched by an Angel	Sharon Mangione	Episode: "Family Business"
1999	JAG	Staff Sergeant Eileen Morris	Episode: "Yeah, Baby"
2001	Nash Bridges	Sally	Episode: "Out of Miami"
2001	Dharma & Greg	Lois	Episode: "Wish We Weren't Here"
2002	According to Jim	Janet	Episode: "The Baby Monitor"
2002	The Practice	Lisa Astin	Episode: "The Cradle Will Rock"
2003	Strong Medicine	Helen McConnell	Episode: "Degeneration"
2003	7th Heaven	Dr. Lisa Sterling	Episode: "The One Thing"
2004	Frasier	Cindy	Episode: "Match Game"
2004	Two and a Half Men	Linda	Episode: "Just Like Buffalo"
2004–2007	Desperate Housewives	Jordana Geist	3 episodes
2005	Angel	Senator Helen Brucker	2 episodes
2005	CSI: NY	Chandra Heckman	Episode: "The Fall"
2005	CSI: Miami	Faith Jennings	Episode: "Prey"
2006	Reba	Cheryl Morgan	Episode: "The Trouble with Dr. Hunky"
2007	Boston Legal	Carol Cabot	Episode: "Selling Sickness"
2007	Entourage	Secretary	Episode: "The First Cut Is the Deepest"
2007	Private Practice	Paige Merring	Episode: "In Which Addison Finds the Magic"
2008	Life	Julie	Episode: "Did You Feel That?"
2009–2011	Men of a Certain Age	Cynthia	
2010	Sons of Tucson	Mrs. Powell	Episode: "Dogs of Tucson"
2010	Good Luck Charlie	Linda Walsh	Episode: "Charlie Goes Viral"
2010	The League	Judge Humphrey	Episode: "The Expert Witness"
2011	The Big Bang Theory	Sandy	Episode: "The Skank Reflex Analysis"
2012	Modern Family	Kim	Episode: "The Last Walt"
2013	Kroll Show	Mark's Wife	Episode: "Can I Finish?"
2013–2014	Betas	Joanne	3 episodes
2016	Mom	Deborah	Episode: "Pure Evil and a Free Slice of Cheesecake"
2018–2019	S.W.A.T.	Nikki	3 episodes
2021	B Positive	Candy Jane Carter	Episode: "B Negative: Part 2"
