= Stanley DeSantis =

American actor and businessman (1953–2005)

- Born: July 6, 1953; Roslyn, New York, U.S.
- Died: August 9, 2005 (aged 52); Los Angeles, California, U.S.
- Occupation: Actor
- Years active: 1978–2005

Stanley DeSantis (July 6, 1953 – August 9, 2005) was an American actor and businessman.

DeSantis was raised in the Chicago area, and graduated from Thornton Township High School in 1971. He appeared in several motion pictures, including Candyman (1992), Ed Wood (1994), Boogie Nights (1997), Rush Hour (1998), I Am Sam (2001), and The Aviator (2004). He also made many television appearances.

When not acting, DeSantis owned and managed a clothing-and-memorabilia business, Passing 4 Sane, and a novelty soap company, Bubbletown, both of which were primarily involved in licensed characters.

DeSantis was openly gay. He died of cardiac arrest in August 2005, and his death was noted in a dedication for the season two finale of Entourage, in which he guest starred in three episodes. He also played a man dying of cardiac arrest in a Six Feet Under episode entitled "The Silence," which aired 23 days before his actual death.

== Selected filmography ==
- The Paper Chase (1978–1979, TV series) as Gagarian, a law student
- Fame (1982, TV series) as The Director
- Black Moon Rising (1986) as The Mover
- Just Say Julie (1988-1992) as The Devil and Various
- Moonlighting (1989, TV series) as Desk Clerk
- ALF (1990, TV series) as Minister
- Vital Signs (1990) as Loan Officer
- Taking Care of Business (1990) as Airport Car Rental Man
- thirtysomething (1991, TV series) as Ad Person
- ’’Medusa: Dare To Be Truthful’’ (1991, Movie) as Benny
- Caged Fear (1991) as Mr. O Daniels
- Candyman (1992) as Dr. Burke
- Doppelganger (1993) as Richard Wolf
- Tales of the City (1993, TV mini-series) as Norman Neal Williams
- My So-Called Life (1994, 3 episodes: "Pilot", "Guns and Gossip," "The Substitute") as Mr. Demitri / Social Studies Teacher
- Ed Wood (1994) as Mr. Feldman
- The Birdcage (1996) as TV Man in Van
- The Truth About Cats & Dogs (1996) as Mario
- The Fan (1996) as Stoney
- Early Edition (1996, TV series) as Howard Phillips
- Fools Rush In (1997) as Judd Marshall
- NYPD Blue (1997, TV series) as Dr. Herbert Wentzel
- Clockwatchers (1997) as Art
- Boogie Nights (1997) as Buck's Manager
- After the Game (1997) as Frank Bertini
- Bulworth (1998) as Manny Liebowitz
- Rush Hour (1998) as FBI Gate Guard #1
- Heartwood (1998) as Gerry Talbot
- Tracey Takes On... (1998–1999, TV series) as Bobby / Albert Pittman
- Stark Raving Mad (1999, TV series) as Jonathan Dalton
- Lansky (1999, TV movie) as Arnold Rothstein
- Head Over Heels (2001) as Alfredo
- See Jane Run (2001)
- The Man Who Wasn't There (2001) as New Man's Customer
- Human Nature (2001) as Doctor
- I Am Sam (2001) as Robert
- Die, Mommie, Die! (2003) as Tuchman
- Curb Your Enthusiasm (2004, TV series) as Stanley
- The Aviator (2004) as Louis B. Mayer
- Entourage (2004–2005, TV series) as Scott Wick
- Six Feet Under (2005, TV series) as Peter Burns
- Something New (2006) as Jack Pino (final film role)
