= Hulk Hogan's Rock 'n' Wrestling =

Professional wrestling themed television series

- Title card
- Genre: Animated series
- Created by: World Wrestling Federation
- Developed by: Jeffrey Scott
- Voices of: Brad Garrett; Charles Adler; Lewis Arquette; James Avery; Jodi Carlisle; George DiCenzo; Ron Feinberg; Pat Fraley; Ron Gans; Aron Kincaid; Ernest Harada; Chuck Licini; Joey Pento; Neil Ross
- Theme music composer: Jim Steinman
- Opening theme: Hulk Hogan's Theme
- Ending theme: Hulk Hogan's Theme
- Country of origin: United States
- Original language: English
- No. of seasons: 2
- No. of episodes: 26

Production
- Producers: Jean Chalopin; Andy Heyward
- Running time: 30 minutes
- Production companies: DIC Enterprises; World Wrestling Federation; Saban Productions (1985 special episode only); Columbia Pictures Television (1985 special episode only)

Original release
- Network: CBS
- Release: September 14, 1985 – October 18, 1986

Hulk Hogan's Rock 'n' Wrestling is an American animated television series that originally aired on CBS Saturday mornings from September 14, 1985 to October 18, 1986, with reruns airing until June 27, 1987.

== Characters ==
Hulk Hogan was the leader of the faces, or good guys, heroes, or protagonists, consisting of Junkyard Dog, Captain Lou Albano, André the Giant, Wendi Richter, Jimmy "Superfly" Snuka, Hillbilly Jim, and Tito Santana. "Rowdy" Roddy Piper was the leader of the heels, or bad guys, villains, or antagonists, consisting of The Iron Sheik, Nikolai Volkoff, The Fabulous Moolah, Big John Studd, and Mr. Fuji. Bobby "The Brain" Heenan and "Mean" Gene Okerlund appeared animated in a few episodes as well.

== Cast ==
- Brad Garrett - Hulk Hogan
- Charlie Adler - "Rowdy" Roddy Piper
- Lewis Arquette - Jimmy "Superfly" Snuka
- James Avery - Junkyard Dog
- Jodi Carlisle - Wendi Richter, The Fabulous Moolah
- George DiCenzo - Captain Lou Albano
- Ron Feinberg - André the Giant
- Pat Fraley - Hillbilly Jim
- Ron Gans - Nikolai Volkoff
- Ernest Harada - Mr. Fuji
- Aron Kincaid - The Iron Sheik
- Chuck Licini - Big John Studd
- Joey Pento - Tito Santana
- Neil Ross - "Mean" Gene Okerlund

== Episodes ==
Hulk Hogan's Rock 'n' Wrestling aired for two seasons beginning in 1985. Each episode was 30 minutes in length (including commercial breaks). Some episodes contained a 30-minute cartoon, while other episodes contained two 15-minute cartoons. Over the two seasons, there were a total of 26 episodes with 39 cartoons.

=== Season 1 (1985) ===
Episode number	Cartoon 1	Cartoon 2	Written by	Original air date	Summary
1	The Junkyard 500	Junkenstein	Jeffrey Scott	Sept. 14, 1985	Junkyard Dog and Roddy Piper race to decide who gets to have their car be in a new movie; Junkyard Dog builds a robot out of spare parts in the junkyard.
2	The Four-Legged Pickpocket	N/A	Jeffrey Scott	Sept. 14, 1985	A horse shows up and causes trouble for the wrestlers.
3	Clean Gene	André's Giant Problem	Larry DiTillio/Jeffrey Scott	Sept. 21, 1985	Hulk and friends decide to clean "Mean" Gene's new house for him; André tries to impress his visiting mother by pretending that he is a chef instead of a wrestler.
4	Gorilla My Dreams	N/A	Jeffrey Scott	Sept. 28, 1985	The wrestlers are invited to a masquerade ball at a fancy hotel, where André, dressed as a gorilla, steps out for some fresh air. Meanwhile, a real gorilla, trained by thieves to steal, goes inside to rob the hotel safe and the thieves abduct André, thinking he is their trained robber.
5	Cheaters Never Prosper	Driving Me Crazy	Jeffrey Scott	Sept. 21, 1985	The Iron Sheik teaches his nephew's baseball team to cheat to win the Junior World Series; the Iron Sheik has a difficult time passing his driving test.
6	The Wrestler's New Clothes	A Lesson in Scouting	Jeffrey Scott	Sept. 28, 1985	André does not have anything to wear to Wendi's high school reunion, so they use a tent to make him an outfit; Junkyard Dog, Wendi and Tito are leading a scout troop, but one of the members is Moolah's troublemaking niece.
7	Hog Society	Wrestling Roommates	Sandy Fries/Jeffrey Scott	Oct. 05, 1985	At his cousin's wedding to a rich man, Jim and his pet pig Lulubelle cause trouble with their hillbilly style; Captain Lou comes to stay with Hulk for a while, but his sloppy habits and attempts to help out around the place drive Hulk crazy.
8	Moolah's Ugly Salon	Ballot Box Boneheads	Jeffrey Scott	Oct. 05, 1985	Moolah and Nikolai help out at a beauty salon that is run by Moolah's sister; Hulk and his crew help an honest politician run against a corrupt mayor.
9	The Duke of Piperton	Robin Hulk & His Merry Wrestlers	Jeffrey Scott	Oct. 12, 1985	Roddy Piper inherits a Scottish castle, but a distant cousin challenges his claim and they must joust to decide who gets the castle; Hulk gets caught in a time machine, where he ends up as "Robin Hulk" of Sherwood Forest and his friends are the Merry Men who must defend the forest from the Iron Sheik, a.k.a. the "Sheik of Nottingham".
10	Small but Mighty	N/A	Larry DiTillio	Oct. 12, 1985	When Jim's Granny's miracle herbs get in the chili, the wrestlers all transform into kids.
11	Rock 'n' Zombie	N/A	Jeffrey Scott	Oct. 19, 1985	Bobby Heenan opens a new amusement park and the wrestlers scheme to get their name on it.
12	The Last Resort	N/A	Larry DiTillo	Oct. 26, 1985	Hulk and his friends get invited to a new hotel, but end up having to fill in for the staff that recently quit. A young prince is staying in the hotel and the young prince needs the wrestlers' help to find a jewel that is missing because he cannot run the country without it. Junkyard Dog plays mentor to the young prince.
13	Bucket	N/A	Larry DiTillio	Nov. 09, 1985	An alien robot lands in the junkyard and the wrestlers rush to help him get back to his home planet before the government can get him.

=== Season 2 (1986) ===
Episode number	Cartoon 1	Cartoon 2	Written by	Original air date	Summary
1	Ali Bano and the 40 Geeks	N/A	Larry DiTillio	Sept. 13, 1986	Wendi gives Captain Lou a magic lamp for his birthday, but the genie cannot do anything right.
2	Captain Lou's Crash Diet	Muscle Madness	Jeffrey Scott (Captain Lou's Crash Diet); Michael Maurer (Muscle Madness)	Sept. 13, 1986	Captain Lou has to lose 40 pounds in 10 days or he is out of wrestling; Hulk enters Wendi in the Miss Muscle Contest against Moolah, with Roddy Piper coaching.
3	10 Little Wrestlers	N/A	Jeffrey Scott	Sept. 20, 1986	Ten wrestlers, five from each side, go on a cruise, but are abducted one by one.
4	Big John's Car Lot	Big Top Boobs	Jeffrey Scott (Big John's Car Lot); Larry DiTillio (Big Top Boobs)	Sept. 27, 1986	The bad guys take over the operations of Big John Studd's family car dealership; the wrestlers perform in a circus.
5	The Foster Wrestler	N/A	Jeffrey Scott	Oct. 11, 1986	While in India, the wrestlers come to India for wrestling matches and discover that someone is stealing the supplies Tito Santana has been sending to his foster child.
6	Ballet Buffoons	Battle of the Bands	Jeffrey Scott	Oct. 11, 1986	Nikolai's ballerina sister gets injured, so he must replace her on stage; Hulk and Roddy Piper compete with their versions of music in a charity concert that Hulk is raising money for a new gymnasium in Hulk's high school.
7	Amazons Just Wanna Have Fun	N/A	Jeffrey Scott	Sept. 20, 1986	"Mean" Gene charters a private plane for the wrestlers and it crash lands in the jungle.
8	The Art of Wrestling	The Blue Lagoons	Jeffrey Scott (The Art of Wrestling); Larry DiTillio (The Blue Lagoons)	Oct. 11, 1986	Hulk becomes a model for Wendi's art class; Hulk and the Iron Sheik are marooned on an island and must work together in order to survive.
9	The Superfly Express	N/A	Jeffrey Scott	Sept. 27, 1986	On a train to California, "Superfly" Snuka meets a new girl and she gets kidnapped.
10	Junkyard Dog's Junkyard Dog	My Fair Wrestler	Jeffrey Scott	Oct. 04, 1986	After a break-in at the junkyard, Junkyard Dog gets a dog for protection.
11	Ghost Wrestlers	N/A	Jeffrey Scott	Oct. 04, 1986	An old wrestler comes to town looking for help getting rid of ghosts in his boarding house.
12	The Wrong Stuff	N/A	Jeffrey Scott	Oct. 18, 1986	Hulk Hogan and Nikolai Volkoff are sent into space to rescue astronauts.
13	Rowdy Roddy Reforms	Three Little Hulks	Jeffrey Scott (Rowdy Roddy Reforms); Larry DiTillio (Three Little Hulks)	Oct. 18, 1986	Roddy Piper gets hypnotized and starts acting nice; Hulk's three nephews come to visit and cause trouble for him and his fellow wrestlers.

== History ==
Hulk Hogan's Rock 'n' Wrestling was animated and produced by DIC Animation City. It featured animated adventures of popular WWF stars from the time, including its title character Hulk Hogan and his group of face wrestlers fighting against a group of rogue heel wrestlers led by "Rowdy" Roddy Piper. The show followed cartoon archetypes concerning good characters triumphing over evildoers in wacky situations, typical of children's cartoons in the 1980s.

Rarely referenced, wrestling was simply a device to determine the good guys from the bad guys. The wrestlers themselves appeared in the live action segments of the show, but due to their busy travel schedules, they did not provide the voices for their animated counterparts. These were instead performed by professional voice actors. One recurring live action segment was the music video for the cover of "Land of a Thousand Dances" recorded by several WWF wrestlers for The Wrestling Album.

Due to the show being animated and the longer production times that resulted, it often failed to keep pace with the events of the WWF at the time. This resulted in certain wrestlers turning heel (or, in non-wrestling terms, a villain) in regular WWF programming, but remaining good guys on the cartoon and vice versa; examples include "Rowdy" Roddy Piper (who was a heel when the show debuted, but became a face in the fall of 1986, despite remaining a bad guy in the cartoon) and André the Giant (who was a face in the fall of 1985, but turned heel in early 1987, despite remaining on the good guys' side throughout the series' run). Additionally, the characters of Jimmy "Superfly" Snuka and Wendi Richter remained throughout the series' run, despite both having left the WWF in late 1985.

In April 2015, WWE added the show to the WWE Network, making its premiere following the April 20 episode of WWE Raw. That July, Hulk Hogan was fired by the WWE and all references to Hulk Hogan, including Hulk Hogan's Rock 'n' Wrestling, were removed from the WWE Network. Hogan was later rehired, though the series did not return to the Network.

In 2025, the WWE Vault YouTube channel began uploading episodes of the series.

== Music ==
The theme to Hulk Hogan's Rock 'n' Wrestling is "Hulk Hogan's Theme", composed by Jim Steinman. It was also used as Hogan's ring entrance theme, before being replaced with "Real American" by Rick Derringer. Steinman later reworked "Hulk Hogan's Theme" into "Ravishing", performed by Bonnie Tyler and featured on her 1986 album Secret Dreams and Forbidden Fire.

== See also ==
- Rock 'n' Wrestling Connection
