= Winnie Holzman =

American dramatist, screenwriter, and poet

- Born: 1953 or 1954 (age 71–72); Manhattan, New York City, New York, U.S.
- Education: Princeton University (BA); New York University (MFA)
- Occupations: Playwright; screenwriter; actress; television producer; poet
- Years active: 1984–present
- Known for: Wicked; My So-Called Life
- Spouse: Paul Dooley (m. 1984)
- Children: Savannah Dooley

Winnie Holzman is an American playwright, screenwriter, actress, and producer. She is best known for writing the script of the Tony Award winning Broadway musical Wicked, and for co-writing the screenplays for the two films based on the musical, Wicked and Wicked: For Good. She also created the television series My So-Called Life. Holzman's other television work includes the series Thirtysomething and Once and Again. Her other stage work includes short plays (in which she appeared with her actor husband, Paul Dooley) and the full-length drama, Choice.

== Early life ==
Holzman was born in Manhattan, New York, but grew up in Roslyn Heights, New York, on Long Island in a Jewish family. Although she was shy, she wanted to become an actor. At 13, she attended Circle in the Square Theatre School in New York.

== Career ==
Holzman graduated with a degree in English and a concentration in Creative Writing at Princeton University. She won many poetry awards, including the Academy of American Poets Prize.

Holzman had been performing in sketch comedy for years, "determined to never make a dime," but on the recommendation of a college friend, she applied to attend the musical theater program at New York University. She eventually got her master's degree in Musical Theatre Writing on a full scholarship. Arthur Laurents was one of her mentors. Other teachers included Stephen Sondheim, Hal Prince, Betty Comden, Adolph Green, and Leonard Bernstein.

=== Theater ===
Holzman contributed scenes to the 1983 satirical musical comedy revue Serious Bizness, which ran at O'Neils Upstairs cabaret in New York City.

While at NYU she wrote the musical Birds of Paradise (with composer David Evans), which was produced Off-Broadway in 1987 and directed by Laurents. It got scathing reviews.

Holzman has written several plays with her husband, actor Paul Dooley. In the short play Post-its®: Notes on a Marriage, an actor and actress read the posted notes between a couple that span the duration of their lives together. Their first full-length collaboration, Assisted Living, premiered April 5 thorough May 12, 2013, at Los Angeles's Odyssey Theatre, starring the couple. The play was retitled One of her Biggest Fans when it ran at George Street Playhouse (New Jersey) from January 28 to February 23, 2014. Holzman said the play was "something we came up with when we were first married," based on a "stack of fan mail that had sat unopened on Paul's desk for months." In the play, "The lives of a cantankerous soap opera star and his makeup artist collide with those of his biggest fan and her father with the discovery of a piece of fan mail that changes everything -- though perhaps not in the ways they once expected." Holzman has described the play as being about " how other people make you change, and how the things that happen in everyday life – the interventions and interactions – change you."

Holzman made her Broadway debut in 2003 when she wrote the book for the Stephen Schwartz musical Wicked, based on the novel of the same name by Gregory Maguire. She won the Drama Desk Award for Outstanding Book of a Musical and was nominated for the Tony Award for Best Book of a Musical.

Holzman's play, Choice, premiered at Huntington Theater Company (Boston) in 2015. It is a complex, sometimes surreal, comedic drama touching on topics that include parenting, friendship, and abortion. An updated version of the play was produced at McCarter Theater (New Jersey) from May 8 to June 2, 2024, with a cast that included Ilana Levine, Dakin Matthews, Caitlin Kinnunen, and Jake Cannavale. The 2024 production incorporated references to the COVID-19 pandemic and set the play in 2020/21.

=== Television ===
In 1988, Holzman's husband, actor-writer Paul Dooley, got a job in Los Angeles on the TV series Coming of Age. While visiting her brother, cinematographer Ernest Holzman, on the set of thirtysomething, writer Richard Kramer suggested she should write for the show. Ed Zwick and Marshall Herskovitz bought a spec script from Holzman, and she went on to become a staff writer on thirtysomething in 1989. She wrote nine episodes during its last two seasons. Zwick and Herskovitz later executive produced My So-Called Life, a show about a teenage girl. Holzman went from story editor to executive story editor to a creator and writer of the show.

Holzman has collaborated on various short films with her daughter, Savannah. They penned a TV pilot based on the Sasha Paley novel Huge, which ABC Family greenlit in January 2010 with a direct-to-series order. Huge premiered in late June 2010. The show team included Holzman, Dooley, her daughter, and her brother, who was the cinematographer. The series was cancelled on October 4, 2010, due to low ratings compared with the network's other summer hits.

From 2014 to 2016, Holzman was one of the producers and writers of the Showtime series Roadies, a behind-the-scenes comedy about people working with a touring rock band, created by Cameron Crowe, J. J. Abrams (executive producing), and Holzman, that ran for a season. The series starred Luke Wilson, Imogen Poots, Keisha Castle-Hughes, Peter Cambor, Rafe Spall and Carla Gugino.

=== Film ===
Holzman wrote the screenplay for the Universal Pictures film adaptation of Wicked. It was released in two parts. The first, Wicked: Part One, was released on November 22, 2024. The sequel film, Wicked: For Good, was released November 21, 2025.

=== Acting ===
Holzman has had a number of acting spots, primarily roles in her own plays with her husband, and cameo roles on her own TV shows. Holzman played the chocolate-obsessed divorced woman in the movie Jerry Maguire and Larry David's wife's therapist on Curb Your Enthusiasm. She wrote and performed several personal essays at the Un-Cabaret spoken word shows in Los Angeles and is featured on their CD Play the Word (Vol. 1).

== Personal life ==
Holzman has been married to character actor Paul Dooley, whom she met at an improv acting class in New York, since 1984. Holzman notes that their 26-year age difference is "... a big part of our lives, but in a way it's meaningless." They have a daughter, Savannah Dooley, and live in Toluca Lake in Los Angeles, California.

== Filmography ==
=== Writing credits ===
==== Film and television ====
- The Wonder Years (1990) (TV) (one episode only)
- Thirtysomething (1990–1991) (TV)
- My So-Called Life (1994–1995) (TV) (Creator)
- 'Til There Was You (1997)
- Once and Again (1999–2002) (TV)
- Huge (2010) (TV) (Co-creator)
- Roadies (2016) (TV)
- Wicked (2024)
- Wicked: For Good (2025)

==== Stage ====
- Serious Bizness (1983)
- A... My Name Is Alice (1983)
- Birds of Paradise (1987)
- Post-its® (Notes on a Marriage) (1998)
- Wicked (2003)
- Assisted Living (2013)
- Choice (2015)

=== Acting credits ===
- Thirtysomething as Sherry Eisen (1990) (TV)
- Major Dad as Mrs. Burns (1992) (TV)
- My So-Called Life as Cathy Kryzanowski (1994) (TV)
- Jerry Maguire as Women's Group Member (1996)
- Love, American Style as Miss Hepker (1999) (TV)
- Once and Again as Shelley (2000–2002) (TV)
- Roswell as Madame Vivian (2000–2002) (TV)
- Hopeless Pictures as Actress (2005) (TV)
- Curb Your Enthusiasm as Dr. Slavin (2007) (TV)
- Checkmate as Mrs. Sappington (2009) (short film)
- The Comeback as Script Supervisor (2014) (TV)
- You People as Mrs. Greenbaum (2023)
- Wicked as Audience Member (2024) (uncredited)
- A Man on the Inside as Pamela Malgrentz (2025) (TV)
