= Jodi Carlisle =

American actress

- Occupation: Actress
- Years active: 1982–present

Jodi Carlisle is an American actress who has appeared in a number of television shows, feature films, video games, television films, and stage plays. Carlisle is perhaps best known as one of the principal voice actors on the Nickelodeon animated TV series The Wild Thornberrys.

== Career ==
=== Voice roles ===
Jodi Carlisle has been performing voice work since 1982, beginning with the cartoon series Pac-Man. Two of her main voice roles were the characters of Wendy Richter and The Fabulous Moolah on the Hulk Hogan's Rock 'n' Wrestling Saturday morning cartoon series. In 1991, she voiced Dr. Sara Bellum in 5 episodes of Darkwing Duck. From 1992-1993, Carlisle provided additional voices in 26 episodes of Wild West C.O.W.-Boys of Moo Mesa. There have also been four voice roles in video games and a number of audiobook narrations.

Perhaps her most popular voice performance was the clan mother character of Marianne Thornberry in the Nickelodeon animated TV series The Wild Thornberrys, voicing in all 90 episodes which ran from 1998 to 2004 as well as the feature films The Wild Thornberrys Movie released in 2002 and Rugrats Go Wild released in 2003. Both films were a success at the box office, grossing $60 million and $50 million respectively; however, the critical reception was more favorable for The Wild Thornberrys Movie than Rugrats Go Wild with Rotten Tomatoes scores of 80% and 41%.

=== Live-action roles ===
In the field of live-action television, Jodi Carlisle has been unable to make a significant impact and hasn't been given a breakthrough role. A large collection of minor parts and guest star roles include 2 episodes each of Desperate Housewives and Criminal Minds: Suspect Behavior, with single appearances in CSI: Crime Scene Investigation, CSI: Miami, Night Court, Malcolm in the Middle, Ugly Betty and That '70s Show. Also, there came the roles of Jean Trull and Dr Gropeman in eight episodes of the web comedy series Ave 43. Prior to her acting and voice work, Carlisle was a contestant on The Joker's Wild and during her career, she later appeared as a contestant on Tic-Tac-Dough.

=== Stage roles ===
Carlisle is an accomplished stage actress and has appeared in many productions, including musicals where her powerful singing voice has been displayed. Most of her roles have been with the Colony Theatre Company based in Los Angeles where Carlisle is an Associate Artist; in productions including Fuddy Meers, A Hole in the Dark, The Matchmaker, Heartbreak Hotel, Picnic, King of Hearts, Working, Passions, Tomfoolery, Could I Have This Dance?, The Man Who Came to Dinner, The Laramie Project and Einstein and the Polar Bear.

Another Colony production, How to Succeed in Business Without Really Trying was reviewed by Julio Martinez for Variety where he commented "Jodi Carlisle exhibits one of the more adroit musical comedy voices as Smitty, belting out such ditties as "Coffee Break", "Been a Long Day" and "Paris Original". More praise came in another Variety review, this time for A Hole in the Dark, where Terry Morgan commented "Miranda goes through more changes than any other character, and local acting treasure Carlisle is equal to every challenge with her robust and rollicking performance." In 1997, Carlisle received the annual LA Drama Critics Circle Natalie Schafer Award.

== Filmography ==
=== Film ===
Year	Title	Role	Notes
1994	Speechless	Doris Wind	
2002	The Wild Thornberrys Movie	Marianne Thornberry (voice)	
2003	Rugrats Go Wild	Marianne Thornberry (voice)	
2007	Protecting the King	Nurse	
2016	Café Society	Maid	

=== Video games ===
Year	Title	Role
1995	The Berenstain Bears Get in a Fight	Mama Bear
1997	Goosebumps: Attack of the Mutant	Chin Chilla
1998	I Can Be an Animal Doctor	Dr. Max
2000	The Wild Thornberrys: Animal Adventures	Marianne Thornberry
2000	Clifford the Big Red Dog: Thinking Adventures	Traffic People
2012	Dishonored	Madam Prudence
2013	Grand Theft Auto V	The Local Population
2016	Final Fantasy XV	Additional Voices

=== Television ===
Year	TV series	Role	Episode
2026	Stranger Things: Tales from '85	Mrs. Gundersson (voice)	
2024	Invincible Fight Girl	Tumble (voice)	2 episodes
2021	Shaman King	Goldva (voice)	6 episodes
2015	Superstore	Sweet Customer	Shots and Salsa
2015	Robot Chicken	Marianne Thornberry (voice)	Zeb and Kevin Erotic Hot Tub Canvas
2011	Criminal Minds: Suspect Behavior	Helen Holton	2 episodes
2010–2012	Ave 43	Jean Trull, Dr. Gropeman	8 episodes
2010	Men of a Certain Age	Mrs. Michaelman	You Gonna Do That the Rest of Your Life?
2009	Action News 6	Acid Stop (voice)	Video
2008	Desperate Housewives	Michelle Downing	2 episodes
2008	Raising the Bar	Judge Emma	Richie Richer
2007	Ugly Betty	Customer	A League of Their Own
2007	Cold Case	Miss Boyd	8:03 AM
2006	Danger Rangers	Mother, Teacher	Safe and Sound
2006	Medium	Whitman's Secretary	Be Kind, Rewind
2006	Shark	Judge	Russo
2006	Big Love	Brynn's Mother	The Baptism
2005	What I Like About You	Classy Older Woman	I Want My Baby Back
2005	Avatar: The Last Airbender	Additional Voices, Herbalist (voice)	2 episodes
2004	CSI: Crime Scene Investigation	Jimmy's Mom	Harvest
2004	That '70s Show	TV Announcer	Baby Don't You Do It
2003	CSI: Miami	Waitress	Double Cap
2003	The Street Lawyer	—N/a	TV Movie
2002	Greetings from Tucson	Butter	Work Ethic
2002	My Life as a Teenage Robot	Vee, Thelma Lou, Teapot (voice)	Episode: "Saved by the Shell/Tradeshow Showdown"; voice role
2001	Malcolm in the Middle	Book Club Lady #1	Book Club
2001	Judging Amy	Therapist	The Beginning, the End and the Murky Middle
2001	The Wild Thornberrys: The Origin of Donnie	Marianne Thornberry (voice)	TV Movie
2000	7th Heaven	Bonnie	Gossip
1999	Providence	Matron	Sail Away
1999	Our Friend, Martin	Additional Voices	Video
1998–2004	The Wild Thornberrys	Marianne Thornberry (voice)	90 episodes
1994	Attack of the 5 Ft. 2 In. Women	Debbie Dallas	TV Movie
1994	Duckman: Private Dick/Family Man	Morgue Receptionist (voice)	Gland of Opportunity
1993	Bonkers	voice	O Cartoon! My Cartoon!
1992–1993	Wild West C.O.W.-Boys of Moo Mesa	Additional Voices	26 episodes
1992	Mad About You	Saleslady	Sofa's Choice
1992	Civil Wars	Lauraine Sofransky	Mob Psychology
1992	Raw Toonage	Additional Voices	Unknown episodes
1992	Medusa: Dare to Be Truthful	Aphrodite	TV Movie
1991	Real Mature	Various	ABC/Nickelodeon: TV pilot
1991	Darkwing Duck	Dr. Sara Bellum (voice)	5 episodes
1990	TaleSpin	Hippo Wife (voice)	Time Waits for No Bear
1990	Night Court	Lana Anders	Amore or Less
1985–1986	Rock 'n' Wrestling	Wendi Richter/The Fabulous Moolah (voice)	23 episodes
1985	ABC Weekend Specials	Brenda	The Velveteen Rabbit
1982	Pac-Man	Additional Voices	3 episodes

== Other works ==
- Associate Artist with the Colony Theater in Los Angeles, where she has appeared in numerous productions.
- (1983-1984): Various voices and characters on "Newsrag," a weekly satirical show on KROQ in Los Angeles.
- (February 2003): Plays Gertie in "Fuddy Meers" play by David Lindsay-Abaire (Colony Theater, New York City, New York, USA).
- (May 2006): Plays Miranda Rosehue in "A Hole in the Dark" play by Hilly Hicks Jr. (2nd Stage Theatre, Hollywood, California, USA).
