= Charlie Coffey (writer) =

American writer, actor and producer

- Born: United States
- Occupations: Writer, actor, producer

Charlie Coffey is an American writer, actor and producer. Coffey is best known for his collaborations with comedian Julie Brown on such projects as Just Say Julie, The Homecoming Queen's Got A Gun, Strip Mall and Earth Girls Are Easy.
