= My So-Called Life =

American drama

- Genre: Teen drama
- Created by: Winnie Holzman
- Starring: Bess Armstrong; Wilson Cruz; Claire Danes; Devon Gummersall; A. J. Langer; Jared Leto; Devon Odessa; Lisa Wilhoit; Tom Irwin
- Theme music composer: W. G. Snuffy Walden
- Opening theme: "My So-Called Life Theme" by W. G. Snuffy Walden
- Country of origin: United States
- Original language: English
- No. of seasons: 1
- No. of episodes: 19

Production
- Executive producers: Marshall Herskovitz; Edward Zwick
- Producer: Alan Poul
- Running time: 47–48 minutes
- Production companies: a.k.a. Productions; The Bedford Falls Company; ABC Productions

Original release
- Network: ABC
- Release: August 25, 1994 – January 26, 1995

Related
- Mein Leben & Ich

My So-Called Life is an American teen drama television series created by Winnie Holzman and produced by Edward Zwick and Marshall Herskovitz. It aired on ABC from August 25, 1994, to January 26, 1995. Set at the fictional Liberty High School in a fictional suburb near Pittsburgh, Pennsylvania, called Three Rivers, it follows the emotional travails of several teenagers in the social circle of main character Angela Chase, played by Claire Danes.

The show was officially canceled on May 15, 1995, despite being critically praised for its realistic portrayal of adolescence and the commentary of its central character Angela, and the series' reception of several major awards, which included a Golden Globe Award for Danes. Besides Danes, the show also launched the careers of several other actors, including Jared Leto and Wilson Cruz. The show became a cult classic and has been frequently cited by multiple publications including Time, Entertainment Weekly, TV Guide, The Atlantic, and Rolling Stone as one of the best teen dramas of all time.

== Premise ==
Angela Chase is a 15-year-old high school student who lives in the fictional Pittsburgh suburb of Three Rivers with her mother Patty, father Graham, and little sister Danielle. Each episode, which is usually narrated by Angela, follows her trials and tribulations as she deals with friends, parents, guys, and school.

== Themes ==
My So-Called Life dealt with major social issues of the mid-1990s, including child abuse, homophobia, teenage alcoholism, homelessness, adultery, school violence, censorship, and drug use. Many shows at the time used these themes as a one-time issue (a "very special episode") that was introduced as a problem at the beginning of an episode and resolved at the end, but on My So-Called Life these issues were part of the continuing storyline. The title of the show alludes to the perception of meaninglessness that many teenagers experience and encapsulates the main theme of the series. The show depicts the teenage years as being difficult and confusing rather than a light, fun-filled time.

== Cast ==
From left to right, Jared Leto as Jordan Catalano, A. J. Langer as Rayanne Graff, Wilson Cruz as Rickie Vasquez, Lisa Wilhoit as Danielle Chase, Devon Odessa as Sharon Cherski, Claire Danes as Angela Chase and Devon Gummersall as Brian Krakow

Main cast

- Bess Armstrong as Patricia "Patty" Chase, Angela's mother
- Wilson Cruz as Enrique "Rickie" Vasquez, Angela's gay friend
- Claire Danes as Angela Chase, a 15-year-old sophomore and narrator of the series
- Devon Gummersall as Brian Krakow, Angela's socially awkward next-door neighbor
- A. J. Langer as Rayanne Graff, Angela's new best friend, a rebellious alcoholic
- Jared Leto as Jordan Catalano, Angela's crush
- Devon Odessa as Sharon Cherski, Angela's childhood best friend
- Lisa Wilhoit as Danielle Chase, Angela's 10-year-old sister
- Tom Irwin as Graham Chase, Angela's father

Recurring cast

- Mary Kay Place as Camille Cherski, Sharon's mother
- Johnny Green as Kyle Vinnovich, Sharon's jock boyfriend
- Lisa Waltz as Hallie Lowenthal, Graham's business partner and potential love interest
- Jeff Perry as Mr. Katimski, gay English teacher who takes Rickie under his wing
- Patti D'Arbanville as Amber Vallone, Rayanne's mother
- Danton Stone as Neil Chase, Graham's brother
- Senta Moses as Delia Fisher, student who has a crush on Brian
- Winnie Holzman as Ms. Krzyzanowski, school guidance counselor

Tino, a friend of Jordan and Rayanne, is never actually seen but is mentioned in almost every episode as a running joke of the series.

== Production ==
=== Development ===
Marshall Herskovitz was approached by Showtime in the 1980s to write a show about teenagers. Herskovitz conceived of the series as a "very personal, very internal" story about a boy with the title Secret/Seventeen, but it was not picked up by the network. A few years later, after the cancellation of Thirtysomething in 1991, Herskovitz and his co-creator Edward Zwick approached Winnie Holzman, a writer on Thirtysomething and The Wonder Years, to brainstorm a new show. Holzman sparked to the idea of an "uncensored" depiction of teenage life. Said Herskovitz, "Most shows about teens on television [in the early '90s, like Beverly Hills, 90210 were very exploitative about sexuality and meant to be titillating rather than inside the experience of what it meant to be an adolescent."

"[In preparation] I taught high school students for two or three days. When I went to this place, Fairfax High in Los Angeles, there were so many moments of sense memory that brought back high school for me: The sound of the bell. The feeling of being trapped in the room. The kids falling asleep in class. The messiness of the hallways. The clanging of lockers. These things were so evocative, and I know they unlocked some stuff for me."

— Creator Winnie Holzman on her inspiration for the series.

To capture contemporary adolescence authentically, Holzman did research and taught classes at Fairfax High School in Los Angeles for a few days. She also kept a diary and wrote down journal entries from the perspective of a teenage girl. These journal entries would later become the basis for Angela's voice-overs.

Holzman named the title character Angela after the niece of a script coordinator on Thirtysomething. Holzman recounted, "She mentioned to me she had a young teenage niece named Angela. I had a phone conversation with [Angela] and it really affected me. I remember she said something like, 'Boys just have it so easy.' And that's in the pilot. So I named the character Angela partly in honor of her."

Intent on dismantling stereotypical portrayals of teens and parents on TV, Holzman wrote Patty Chase, the wife and mother character, as the breadwinner of the Chase family and husband Graham as the homebody. Holzman portrayed the parents as in the "midst of establishing their identities and discovering their incompatibility with traditional domestic tropes."

=== Casting ===
In keeping with their desire to portray adolescence authentically, producers looked for actors who were close in age to their teen characters. Before Claire Danes was cast, Alicia Silverstone auditioned for the role of Angela and impressed Zwick, and as an emancipated minor could work longer hours, but was not deemed the right fit for "Holzman’s messy high-school universe, which included subplots about drug addiction, bullying, binge drinking, promiscuity, and homosexuality." Herskovitz said, "We needed somebody who shimmered between beauty and sort of not formed yet. And in walks Claire. She read the scene in the pilot where she has a confrontation with her childhood best friend. There was a direction that said, 'Angela starts to tear up.' Claire gets to the moment. Her whole face turns red. She's having this intense emotional experience — and then pulls it back. Everybody was just knocked out." As Danes was 15 and had to attend school alongside filming, producers ended up increasing the screen time for the parental characters to accommodate for Danes.

Wilson Cruz was cast as Rickie Vasquez, who was written in the script as "half black, half Puerto Rican, sexually ambiguous like Jodie Foster in Alice Doesn't Live Here Anymore". The character of Rickie was inspired by Holzman's peers as a teenager, as well as by the 1990 documentary Paris Is Burning, which explores ball culture in New York City. Cruz drew on some of his own experiences, such as a period of homelessness after he came out to his dad, for his portrayal of Rickie.

Jared Leto was supposed to appear in just the pilot episode, but his acting and chemistry with Danes impressed producers and he was upgraded to the main cast.

=== Filming ===
The pilot was shot in April 1993. An enthusiastic response from ABC executives and TV critics raised producers' hopes for a series debut in the 1993–1994 TV season lineup; however, ABC delayed My So-Called Life’s addition as they pondered over the right time slot for the show. The show finally premiered in the Thursday night lineup in August 1994, a year and a half after the filming of the pilot.

The series was filmed in the Los Angeles area. Scenes at the fictional Liberty High School were shot on location at University High School.

Due to the show's rapid shooting schedule and the uncertainty of its future, producers "did not have the luxury of planning out the season's arc in advance," and story lines would unfold episode to episode. Network executives did give the show's creators relatively free rein to explore what were then seen as risky subjects for network TV, such as teen sexuality and sexual orientation.

== Reception ==
=== Critical reception ===
Upon its debut, My So-Called Life received critical acclaim. Critic Joyce Millman said the show "evokes the emotional turbulence of adolescence with breathtaking accuracy" and is also "unusually perceptive in its portrayal of the push and pull of mother-daughter relationships." Millman added the show has an interesting take on "midlife crisis and marital boredom", and concluded "with bittersweet clarity, My So-Called Life shows us that teen angst is something we never outgrow."

The Hartford Courant called it "one of the most humanizing hours of television to come along in decades." Steven Spielberg lauded the show and called Danes "one of the most exciting actresses to debut in 10 years", likening her to Audrey Hepburn.

In a critical review, Howard Rosenberg of the Los Angeles Times found the teen characters grating and the plot lines to be too neatly resolved, but did praise Holzman's writing and Danes' acting. Rosenberg wrote, "you also recognize that Holzman has a witty grasp on adolescence and knows a bull’s-eye when she sees one...Another plus is the brooding self-consciousness that seems so genuine in Angela, a credit to Danes’ effortless performance. Her nervous body language speaks volumes, as do her character's private thoughts, delivered as part of a voice-over narration in the manner of 'The Wonder Years.'"

After the series' cancellation and over the years, the series continued to gain acclaim for its realism and is praised by some critics as one of the greatest television series of all time. On review aggregation website Rotten Tomatoes, Season 1 has a 94% approval rating based on 53 reviews. The site's consensus reads, "Effectively avoiding cliche and cheesy exposition, My So-Called Life's realistic portrayal of the average American girl is ahead of its time". On Metacritic, which assigns a weighted average rating, the show has a score of 92 out of 100 based on 19 reviews, indicating "universal acclaim". It is the 20th highest rated television series on the website. In 2007, it was listed as one of Time's "100 Best TV Shows of All-TIME". Time critic James Poniewozik wrote,

Angela Chase (Claire Danes) was a fully realized TV teen, smart and perceptive one minute, whiny and unstable the next, ready to burst into red-faced tears after getting jerked around by learning-challenged heartthrob Jordan Catalano. Angela's narration was angsty in that '90s, suburban, I've-listened-to-In-Utero-a-million-times way—"School is a battlefield for your heart"—but she won the battle for our hearts anyway.

In 2008, AOL TV named My So-Called Life as the second Best School Show of All Time. It was number 33 on Entertainment Weekly's "New Classics TV" list of shows from 1983 to 2008, and as number 8 in the "25 Greatest Cult TV Shows Ever". TV Guide ranked the series number 16 on its 25 Top Cult Shows Ever list in 2004, as well as number 2 on its 2013 list of 60 shows that were "Cancelled Too Soon".

=== Awards and nominations ===
Year	Award	Category	Recipients	Result	Ref.
1994	Young Artist Awards	Best Performance by a Youth Actress in a Drama Series	Lisa Wilhoit	tied	
1994	Young Artist Awards	Best Performance by a Youth Ensemble in a Television Series	My So-Called Life	Won	
1994	Young Artist Awards	Best New Family Television Series	My So-Called Life	Won	
1994	Young Artist Awards	Best Performance by a Youth Actor in a Drama Series	Devon Gummersall	Nominated	
1995	Golden Globe Awards	Best Actress – Television Series Drama	Claire Danes	Won	
1995	Primetime Emmy Awards	Outstanding Lead Actress in a Drama Series	Claire Danes	Nominated	
1995	Primetime Emmy Awards	Outstanding Directing for a Drama Series	Scott Winant for "Pilot"	Nominated	
1995	Primetime Emmy Awards	Outstanding Writing for a Drama Series	Winnie Holzman for "Pilot"	Nominated	
1995	Primetime Emmy Awards	Outstanding Main Title Theme Music	W. G. Snuffy Walden	Nominated	
1995	GLAAD Media Award	Outstanding Drama Series	My So-Called Life	Won	
1995	TCA Awards	Program of the Year	My So-Called Life	Nominated	
1995	TCA Awards	Outstanding Achievement in Drama	My So-Called Life	Won	
1996	Bravo Otto Awards	Best Performance by an Actor in a TV Series	Jared Leto	Nominated	

=== Ratings ===
For its original run in the United States, the show aired on Thursday nights at 8 p.m. ET against top-10 hit sitcoms — Mad About You and Friends on NBC, as well as the popular Martin, Living Single and New York Undercover on Fox, possibly contributing to the series' low ratings.

The producers said that they could not fault ABC for the creative freedom and support they gave them during production, as there were probably few networks that would have even put My So-Called Life on the air in the first place.

My So-Called Life was produced before the explosion of youth and teen programming. The culture of television changed significantly in the years that immediately followed, most notably with the rise of The WB and UPN—networks that catered to the teenaged audience My So-Called Life sought—during the late 1990s and early 2000s (The WB and UPN launched just two weeks and one week, respectively, before My So-Called Life's run on ABC ended). "Networks didn’t understand that you could sell to adolescent girls," said Herskovitz. Although My So-Called Life drew adult fans in addition to teenage viewers, the ratings-focused ABC concluded not enough viewers of a particular demographic were watching the show during its initial network run. Holzman said, "It is one thing to have huge ratings, but it is quite another to have smaller ratings but with an extremely passionate following. I don't understand why the network did not understand that."

When the network was considering canceling the show, producers Zwick and Herskovitz appealed to then-ABC President Bob Iger, telling him, "You should keep this show on the air because teenage girls have no voice in our culture, and the show is giving them a voice." In January 1995, it was reported the show averaged 10 million viewers per week, a number ABC president of entertainment Ted Harbert said was high, but still fell short compared to ABC sitcom Home Improvement, which averaged 30 million viewers weekly.

=== Cancelation ===
An online fan campaign attempted to save My So-Called Life, the first such event in the history of the World Wide Web. Bolstered by fans' support, Ted Harbert said he was prepared to bring the show back for a second season. However, Herskovitz said at that time Danes and her parents approached the show's creators and told producers that she did not want to be involved with the show if it continued, citing the arduous shooting schedule which required the show's young actors to balance schoolwork with rehearsal and time on the set.

When Holzman learned Danes was no longer keen to continue with the show, her attitude changed as well. Holzman said, "When I realized that Claire truly did not want to do it any more, it was hard for me to want to do it. The joy in writing the show was that everyone was behind it and wanted to do it. And I love her. So part of the joy and excitement and happiness would have gone out of me if she had not been on board 100 percent. I wasn't able to say this at the time, but in retrospect it was a blessing for it to end at a time when we all enjoyed doing it. That's not to say that if the network had ordered more shows that I wouldn't have given it my best. But there was a rightness in how short the season was. This was a show about adolescence and sort of ended in its own adolescence. There was an aura about how short the series was like all things that die young. The show ended at a point that it was still all potential."

The show was officially canceled on May 15, 1995, for its "far too narrow" appeal. Although the fan campaign was not successful in getting a second season, the surrounding publicity led to MTV airing repeats of the show a month prior, which helped the show gain newer exposure. In a 2004 interview with Entertainment Weekly, Danes insisted that she did not have enough power to cause the cancelation by herself. It is generally accepted that the show's cancelation was the result of a variety of factors, including low ratings and scant publicity from the network. Bess Armstrong said, "Actually, I don't think there were any bad guys. It was just a confluence of events. It was a perfect storm." Winnie Holzman theorized that the network was so on-the-fence about renewing the show in the first place that in some ways they used Danes' reluctance to return as a convenient excuse to not renew the series.

== Episodes ==
No.	Title	Directed by	Written by	Original release date	Prod. code	Viewers (millions)
1	"Pilot"	Scott Winant	Winnie Holzman	August 25, 1994	59300	11.7
As Angela Chase starts her sophomore year at Liberty High, she dyes her hair red and abandons her best friend Sharon for her outgoing new friend Rayanne. She starts reading Anne Frank's Diary of a Young Girl, which she greatly enjoys, feeling that she relates to Anne Frank in some ways. This episode establishes her romantic interest in Jordan Catalano. She lies to her parents that she's staying at Rayanne's; instead, she, Rayanne, and Rickie head to a club but are unable to gain access. The two girls are hit on by some guys in the parking lot; after a confrontation, a cop drives them home and Jordan Catalano notices Angela in the backseat of the police car.
2	"Dancing in the Dark"	Scott Winant	Winnie Holzman	September 1, 1994	59301	8.2
Rayanne arranges for Jordan Catalano to sell Angela a fake ID as a ruse for getting Jordan and Angela interact more. Unfortunately, Jordan bungles in his romantic approach to Angela; although this constitutes the first time the two kiss, she describes it in a later episode as a really bad kiss. Meanwhile, Patty and Graham stumble through ballroom-dancing lessons meant to spice up their marriage.
3	"Guns and Gossip"	Marshall Herskovitz	Justin Tanner	September 8, 1994	59302	8.9
After a gunshot goes off in school, Brian Krakow experiences pressure from authority figures to inform on Rickie, who is suspected of bringing the gun to school; he didn't, but he wants fellow students to think he did, believing that he will be harassed less for his bisexuality. He points out in class that firearms are not just tools of aggression; they are also often tools of defense. After Angela comforts Rickie in his car, their friendship grows stronger. The parents panic more about the gun incident than the students do. Meanwhile, Angela is dealing with a rumor that she had sex with Jordan Catalano; she discovers that the rumor originated with Brian Krakow.
4	"Father Figures"	Mark Rosner	Winnie Holzman	September 15, 1994	59303	9.7
Patty, who runs her father's printing business, must deal with him when the IRS decides to do an audit; all of her various suggestions go unheard by her unyielding father. Meanwhile, Angela gives her own father the silent treatment after accidentally seeing him with another woman. Graham gives her and Rayanne Grateful Dead tickets, but Angela scalps them, angering Rayanne, who has no father figure so appreciates her interactions with Graham. Angela hides in Brian Krakow's car to make her dad think she went to the concert, knowing he'd be disappointed to learn she didn't, but he discovers the truth and gives her the silent treatment. Eventually he asks Angela what kind of music she likes.
5	"The Zit"	Victor DuBois	Betsy Thomas	September 22, 1994	59304	8.6
The Annual Three Rivers Mother-Daughter Fashion Show is approaching. Rayanne's slut potential and Sharon's large breasts get mentioned on a Sophomore Girls List made by some jocks. Angela, who is not on the list, feels self-conscious about her small breasts and a zit on her chin and concludes that she is ugly; coincidentally, Sharon becomes self-conscious about her large breasts. Patty doesn't understand why Angela doesn't wish to participate in the fashion show until she learns of Angela's insecurities. Angela suggests that her mom do the fashion show with Danielle.
6	"The Substitute"	Ellen S. Pressman	Jason Katims	September 29, 1994	59305	9.0
An unconventional substitute teacher (Roger Rees) temporarily turns Angela's English class into a poetry-writing club that encourages students to express themselves. Controversy arises when students’ poems are published in the school’s literary magazine and the principal finds the content to be inappropriate. When the principal threatens to suspend any student distributing copies, Angela defies him and engages in civil disobedience.
7	"Why Jordan Can't Read"	Mark Piznarski	Liberty Godshall	October 6, 1994	59307	9.1
Angela and Jordan get close when she learns of his reading problem by discovering that he was unable to read a note he found that she had written about him. She speculates that he might be dyslexic, although he doubts it. After being invited to his band's practice session, she grows even closer to him when she hears his new song, "Red," which she and Rickie believe is about her, but which is actually about his car. Meanwhile, Patty might be pregnant: Graham warms to the possibility of having a son, but when they learn Patty isn't pregnant, she realizes that he's disappointed. Graham resorts to playing catch with Brian Krakow.
8	"Strangers in the House"	Ron Lagomarsino	Jill Gordon	October 20, 1994	59308	9.3
After her father has a heart attack, Sharon moves in with the Chases temporarily. Angela wants to get closer to her but doesn't know how; however, Rayanne does get closer to Sharon and drives her to the hospital. Sharon's father is about Graham's age, and the experience prompts him to think about his future and his dissatisfaction with his job. He lands a big account, but Patty fires him as a way to free him to pursue a more fulfilling career.
9	"Halloween"	Mark Piznarski	Jill Gordon	October 27, 1994	59401	9.8
Halloween rolls into Three Rivers, blurring the line between facades and realities. When Patty and Graham venture to buy costumes on Halloween day, a pirate costume and a Rapunzel costume are all they can find, but serendipitously the costumes lead them to passionate roleplaying. Danielle dresses as Angela and goes trick-or-treating with Sharon. Meanwhile, Angela dresses as a schoolgirl from the early 1960s. After learning of Nicky Driscoll, a student who died in the early '60s, she, Rayanne, and Rickie decide to break into the school on Halloween night. Brian shows up too, facilitates the break-in, and comforts the achluophobic Rayanne in the basement while Angela sees visions of Nicky Driscoll and the events leading to his death. The experience gives Angela the motivation to convince Jordan Catalano not to let his teachers define his life for him.
10	"Other People's Mothers"	Claudia Weill	Richard Kramer	November 3, 1994	59306	9.8
Rayanne throws a party on the same night of Angela's grandparents’ anniversary dinner. After an argument with Patty, Angela heads to Rayanne’s. Rayanne overdoses on a cocktail of ecstasy and alcohol, but her mother Amber shows little concern about her condition. Patty comes over and takes Rayanne to the hospital.
11	"Life of Brian"	Todd Holland	Jason Katims	November 10, 1994	59402	9.6
This episode is told from Brian's viewpoint as the school World Happiness Dance screws up everyone's love lives, Brian gets his first erection "from actual physical contact" when new transfer student Delia (Senta Moses) touches his hand, and he asks her to the dance. Jordan won't ask Angela to the dance, so Angela asks Brian to drive her there; realizing that this is his chance to woo Angela, he cancels on Delia. Rickie develops a crush on Cory, whom Rayanne asks to the dance with her and Rickie. At the dance, Rickie thinks Cory might be hitting on him, but it's soon clear that Cory was interested in Rayanne all along. Angela gets angry at Brian for snubbing Rickie and scheming to get her alone. Brian sees Delia at the dance and tries unsuccessfully to reconcile. Jordan comes to the dance and tells Angela that he likes the way "she is." Angela, buoyed by a successful conversation with Jordan, admits she ruined Brian's night and asks him to dance; he declines. In 1997, TV Guide ranked this episode #37 on its list of the 100 Greatest Episodes.
12	"Self-Esteem"	Michael Engler	Winnie Holzman	November 17, 1994	59403	8.8
Jordan won't acknowledge his new relationship with Angela, but continues to meet her at school for makeout sessions that he tells her to keep secret. The distraction starts to negatively impact Angela's academic performance, especially in geometry class. Rayanne and Sharon express skepticism about Jordan's treatment of Angela, who lies that he's asked her on a date to a concert. At the concert, Jordan snubs Angela, and Rayanne tells him off. Back at school Angela finally tells Jordan she won't accept his terms. Graham starts cooking classes and meets a charismatic woman, but the alcoholic teacher keeps missing the class. Patty assumes Graham wants to quit, or that his shortcomings causing the class to go poorly. When the teacher goes to rehab, Graham is asked to teach the class. A new teacher invites Rickie to join the drama club. In 2009, TV Guide ranked this episode #44 on its list of the 100 Greatest Episodes.
13	"Pressure"	Mark Piznarski	Ellen Herman	December 1, 1994	59404	10.4
Jordan pressures Angela to sleep with him; Graham considers starting his own restaurant.
14	"On the Wagon"	Jeff Perry	Elizabeth Gill	December 8, 1994	59405	9.1
Feeling left out of Angela's life, Rayanne becomes lead singer of Jordan's band, the Frozen Embryos. Meanwhile, Patty suspects that Rayanne has started drinking again.
15	"So-Called Angels"	Scott Winant	Winnie Holzman & Jason Katims	December 22, 1994	59406	11.2
Christmas in Three Rivers finds Rickie out on the street after a fight with his abusive uncle. Aided by a mysterious homeless girl (Juliana Hatfield), Angela tries to help him which puts her at odds with Patty. Meanwhile, Brian faces Christmas alone.
16	"Resolutions"	Patrick R. Norris	Ellen Herman	January 5, 1995	59407	10.5
As the new year begins, everybody makes resolutions without intending to keep them. Rickie's home situation sends him on his own odyssey; Brian and Jordan tutor each other; and Graham considers Hallie's proposition(s).
17	"Betrayal"	Mark Piznarski	Jill Gordon	January 12, 1995	59408	9.9
Rayanne wins the starring role in the school play but loses Angela's friendship after she and Jordan get drunk and have sex in his car.
18	"Weekend"	Todd Holland	Adam Dooley	January 19, 1995	59409	10.4
Rayanne accidentally handcuffs herself to Patty and Graham's bed when Angela's parents go out of town for a weekend in this episode narrated from Danielle's perspective.
19	"In Dreams Begin Responsibilities"	Elodie Keene	Winnie Holzman	January 26, 1995	59410	11.8
Everybody in Three Rivers is having weird dreams lately. Jordan, hoping to win Angela back, enlists Brian to help him say the right words, resulting in The Letter. Delia has a crush on Rickie, Patty dreams about her old beau, and Graham cooks for the investors. Rickie's odyssey and the MSCL season both conclude.

=== Planned storylines ===
Had the show continued, Winnie Holzman said a second season would potentially have seen Patty and Graham getting a divorce, Angela turning to Brian for comfort, Sharon dealing with a teen pregnancy, and Brian and Delia getting together at some point.

== Cultural impact ==
My So-Called Life has received positive reviews for its portrayal of adolescence and for launching a revolution of teen angst-oriented dramas on primetime TV. It is credited with moving teen dramas away from the soap opera tone of previous shows like Beverly Hills, 90210 and towards a more realistic look at everyday teenage life.

On a 2012 list of cult TV shows, critic Melissa Maerz wrote "it was the first teen drama that didn't feel like an after-school special. No one ever learned a very important lesson or uttered the phrase 'I love you, Dad.' Angela acted like a real 15-year-old, with all the crying jags and Buffalo Tom concerts that implies. What's even more impressive is that anyone who watched the show back in the '90s, when angst and Manic Panic felt totally of the moment, can now enjoy it on a very different level. Suddenly, Angela's parents are relatable. Dammit, we're old."

Of the character types explored in the show, Jeff Jensen of Entertainment Weekly wrote, "[Winnie] Holzman took these stock types and made them complicated and real — you didn't need to be a girl to feel Angela's longing for Jordan, didn't need to be gay to connect with Rickie's coming-out journey." The character of Rickie Vasquez became the first openly queer character on primetime TV, and the first queer character of color. The final episode of the series, "In Dreams Begin Responsibilities" is notable for featuring a moment in which Ricky says out loud that he's gay — "a first for both the character and network television." While doing publicity for the show at the time, Cruz made a point of communicating that he was gay in real life.

In a 2017 article for The Guardian, Soraya Roberts wrote My So-Called Life "not only flirted with gender fluidity before it became a part of the national conversation, it questioned the parameters of conventional maleness," and "was the rare primetime show that candidly discussed teen sex (according to the Kaiser Family Foundation, by 1996 only 12% of shows involved adolescent sexual content) – not only that, teen girl sex." The episode "Guns and Gossip" is notable for addressing the topic of gun violence in schools, five years before Columbine.

Numerous showrunners and creators of teen-centered dramas or sitcoms, including Nahnatchka Khan (Fresh Off the Boat), Brian Yorkey (13 Reasons Why), Stephanie Savage (Gossip Girl), and Terri Minski (Andi Mack), have cited MSCL and its impact on them as teens. Showrunner and Arrowverse creator Greg Berlanti called the series "the most painfully honest portrayal of adolescence ever on television."

The series is ranked at number 68 on the Writers Guild of America 2013 list of the 101 Best-Written TV Series, and is frequently included in lists of TV shows that were cancelled too soon.

My So-Called Life also inspired a German version of the sitcom called Mein Leben & Ich, which ran for 6 seasons and a total of 74 episodes, 25 minutes each.

== Home media ==
A subset of the episodes were released on VHS by BMG Video in 1998.

On November 19, 2002, BMG released the complete series on a five-disc box set.

On May 14, 2007, Universal Playback released the complete series in the United Kingdom in Region 2.

On October 30, 2007, Shout! Factory re-released My So-Called Life on DVD in Region 1 in a six-disc box set with a disc of special features, including an interview with series star Claire Danes. Shout! Factory is a distribution company that has released short-lived shows in the past.

On September 13, 2007, Eurovideo released the complete series on DVD in Germany in Region 2; The 5-disc boxset featured German and English soundtrack but no special features.

On June 10, 2008, Beyond Home Entertainment released the complete series on DVD in Australia in Region 4.

On December 3, 2008, Free Dolphin released the complete series on DVD in France in Region 2, with a 32-page booklet but no other special features.

As of March 2021, Hulu is the official streaming service for the series.

== Soundtrack ==
Atlantic Records released a soundtrack of the show on August 25, 1994, and re-released it on January 24, 1995.

My So-Called Life (Music from the Television Series)

Soundtrack album by Various artists
- Released: August 25, 1994; January 24, 1995 (re-release)
- Length: 34:54
- Label: Atlantic Records

My So-Called Life (Music from the Television Series)
No.	Title	Writer(s)	Artists	Length
1.	"Make It Home"		Juliana Hatfield	4:44
2.	"Soda Jerk"		Buffalo Tom	4:26
3.	"Genetic"		Sonic Youth	3:46
4.	"Petty Core"		Further	3:46
5.	"Drop a Bomb"		Madder Rose	2:11
6.	"Fountain and Fairfax"		Afghan Whigs	4:21
7.	"South Carolina"		Archers of Loaf	3:30
8.	"Dawn Can't Decide"		The Lemonheads	2:19
9.	"The Book Song"		Frente!	2:40
10.	"Come See Me Tonight"		Daniel Johnston	1:59
11.	"My So-Called Life Theme"	W. G. Snuffy Walden	W. G. Snuffy Walden	1:12
Total length:				34:54

== Sequel novel ==
A sequel novel by Catherine Clark, My So-Called Life Goes On, was published in 1999 by Random House.
