= Alex Winter =

British-American actor (born 1965)

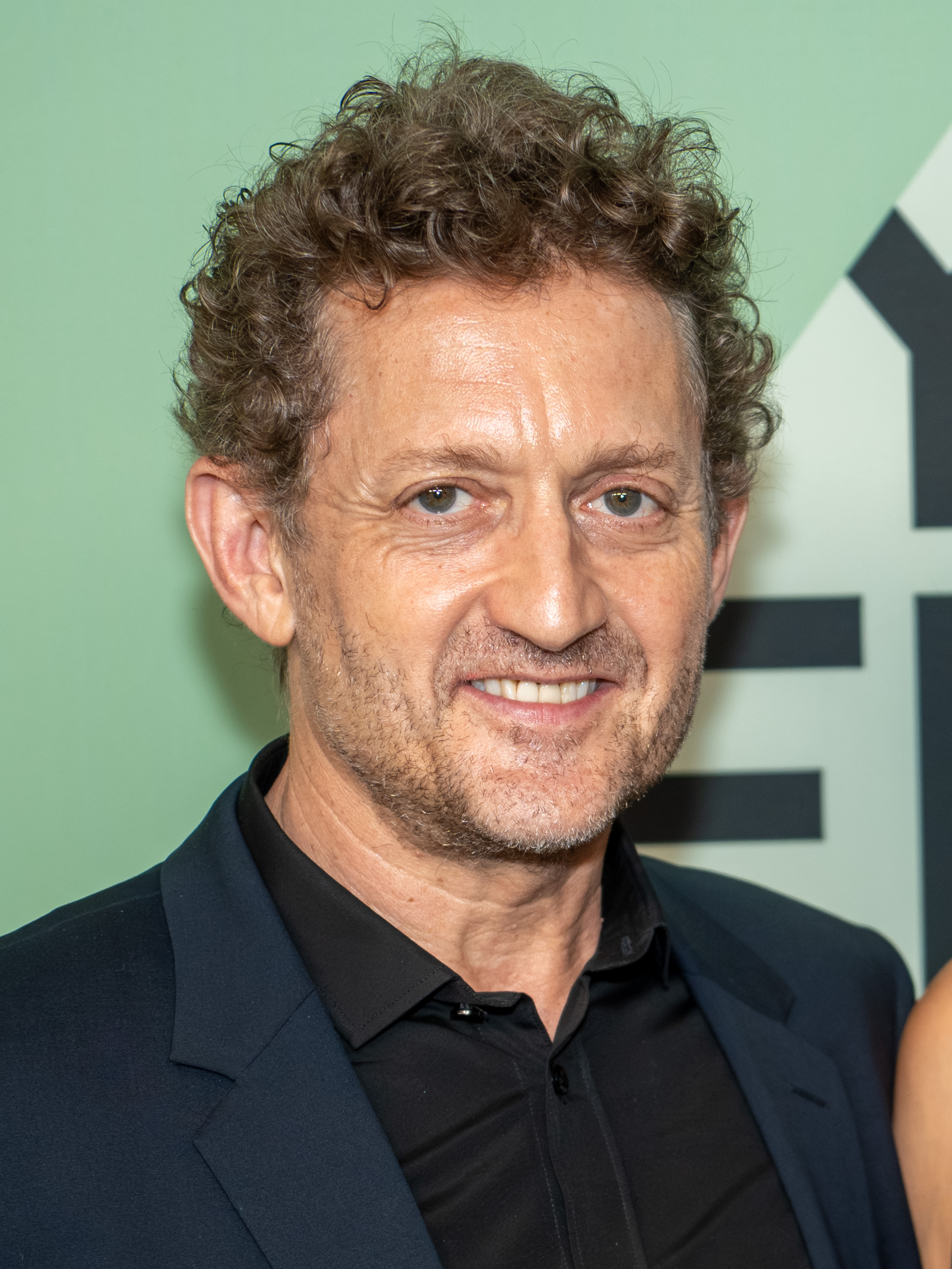
- Winter at 2025 New York Film Festival
- Born: Alexander Ross Winter; July 17, 1965 (age 61); London, England
- Citizenship: United Kingdom; United States
- Education: New York University
- Occupations: Actor; filmmaker
- Years active: 1978–present
- Spouses: Sonya Dawson (m. 1995; div. ?); Ramsey Ann Naito (m. 2010)
- Children: 3

Alexander Ross Winter (born July 17, 1965) is a British-American actor and filmmaker. As an actor, he is best known for playing Bill S. Preston, Esq., in the 1989 film Bill & Ted's Excellent Adventure and its sequels Bill & Ted's Bogus Journey (1991) and Bill & Ted Face the Music (2020). He is also known for his role as Vladimir in the 2026 Broadway revival of Waiting for Godot, and for playing Marko in the 1987 vampire film The Lost Boys.

As a filmmaker, Winter is known for his documentaries, including Zappa (2020) and Deep Web (2015), for directing the feature film, Adulthood (2025), and co-writing, co-directing, and starring in the 1993 surrealist comedy film Freaked. He has also directed numerous television shows and co-created sketch comedy series The Idiot Box (1991).

== Early life ==
Winter was born in London on 17 July 1965. His mother, Gregg Mayer, is a New York-born dancer who trained with Martha Graham, and founded a modern-dance company in London in the mid-1960s. His father, Ross Albert Winter, is an Australian who danced with Winter's mother's troupe and co-founded the Mid American Dance Company in St. Louis. His father has English ancestry and his mother is Jewish, of Ukrainian Jewish descent. Winter's family was not religiously observant, although he went to Jewish summer camp and learned Yiddish through his grandmother.

Winter received training in dance as a child. When he was five, his family moved to Missouri, where his father ran the Mid-American Dance Company (later, Modern American Dance Company), while his mother taught dance at Washington University in St. Louis. The two divorced in 1973.

In 1978, Winter moved to the New York City area, where he and his mother lived in the city and in Montclair, New Jersey. During this time Winter began performing as an actor on and off Broadway, commuting into New York City.

In 1983, after graduating from Montclair High School, Winter was accepted into the Tisch School of the Arts at New York University, where he majored in film and minored in photography. While at NYU, he met fellow aspiring filmmaker Tom Stern. The two collaborated on a number of 16 mm short films.

== Career ==
=== Acting and directing ===
Winter began acting professionally at ten years old and spent his teen years on Broadway with supporting roles in productions of The King and I, with Yul Brynner, Peter Pan, with Sandy Duncan, and the American premiere of Simon Gray's Close of Play at the Manhattan Theatre Club, directed by Lynne Meadow.

Winter made his feature film acting debut in the 1985 film Death Wish 3, while still a film student at NYU. He dropped out of film school before his senior year in order to accept a role in the film, The Lost Boys (1987). Winter moved to Hollywood, where he began to write and direct a number of short films and music videos. He continued to find work as an actor, with notable roles in such productions as Ivan Passer's Haunted Summer and Percy Adlon's Rosalie Goes Shopping (1989).

In 1989, Winter found international success when he co-starred with Keanu Reeves, playing William "Bill" S. Preston Esq. in the comedy Bill & Ted's Excellent Adventure, a role he reprised in its 1991 sequel, Bill & Ted's Bogus Journey.

Following the success of Bill & Ted, Winter and creative collaborators Tom Stern and Tim Burns were hired to develop a sketch comedy show for MTV. The result, 1991's The Idiot Box, was a hit for the network in its first season. Winter, Stern and Burns declined an offer to make a second season of the Idiot Box and instead accepted a $12 million deal from 20th Century Fox with Winter and Stern jointly making their feature film directorial debut and Winter starring in the 1993 comedy, Freaked. The film was never widely released, despite positive reviews from The New York Times and Entertainment Weekly. It has since become a cult favorite, with a global re-release in 2025, with the Idiot Box being re-released at the same time.

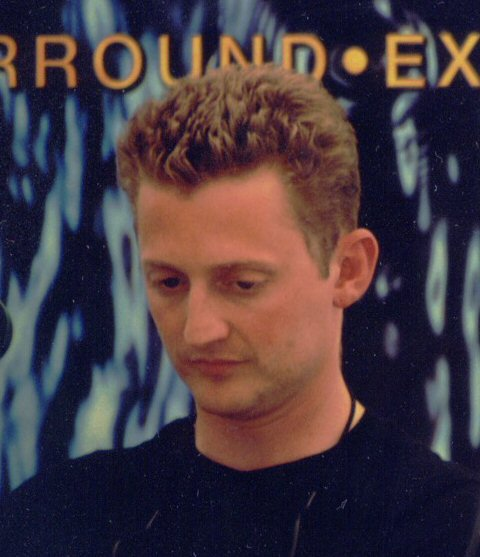
Winter at the 1999 Cannes Film Festival

Winter spent the next several years in London, directing award-winning TV commercials and music videos. He returned to feature films in 1999, when he wrote and directed the psychological thriller Fever which starred Henry Thomas in the lead role. The film was shown at film festivals worldwide, including Official Selection in the Director's Fortnight at Cannes. The New York Daily News called the film "a claustrophobic mind bender. Winter sustains an aura of creepiness worthy of Roman Polanski." In the New York Times, AO Scott praised the film as "Pure Hitchcockian panic. An arresting example of what a talented filmmaker can accomplish with the sparest of means."

In 2007, Winter directed and acted in the live-action adaptation of the hit Cartoon Network series Ben 10, which aired on Cartoon Network in November 2007 and garnered the highest ratings in the channel's history. He also directed its sequel, Ben 10: Alien Swarm, which aired on Cartoon Network in November 2009 and captured over 16 million viewers in its premiere weekend. In 2010, he was attached to direct a 3D-remake of the 1987 horror film The Gate, which was scheduled for release in 2011 but went unproduced.

In 2011, Winter formed his company, Trouper Productions, to service his directing work. Winter's 2012 VH1 rock doc Downloaded earned worldwide acclaim at theatrical and festival screenings. Winter's award-winning 2015 documentary Deep Web had its world premiere at SXSW and a broadcast premiere in the U.S. on the MGM network alongside a global festival tour.

In 2013, he featured in the thriller Grand Piano, starring Elijah Wood and John Cusack, in his first major feature film role after 20 years.

In 2016, Winter released a short documentary entitled Relatively Free about journalist Barrett Brown's release from prison. This was followed in 2017 by another short documentary, Trump's Lobby

In 2018, Winter released two documentaries; multiple award-winner The Panama Papers, executive produced by Laura Poitras, about the largest global corruption scandal in history, and the journalists who worked in secret and at considerable risk to break the story. And Trust Machine: The Story of Blockchain. In July 2015, Winter began work on a biographical documentary of the rock guitarist and composer Frank Zappa. The Zappa Family Trust publicly gave its approval to Winter's plans for the film. Released on November 27, 2020, Zappa was the first documentary with access to his archives, and was the highest funded documentary in crowdfunding history, via Kickstarter. The film was a Critics Pick in the New York Times, and nominated for Best Music Documentary by the Critics Choice Awards.

In 2020, Winter also released his feature documentary, Showbiz Kids, which premiered on HBO to positive reviews, garnering a Critics Choice nomination for Best Score by Tweedy.

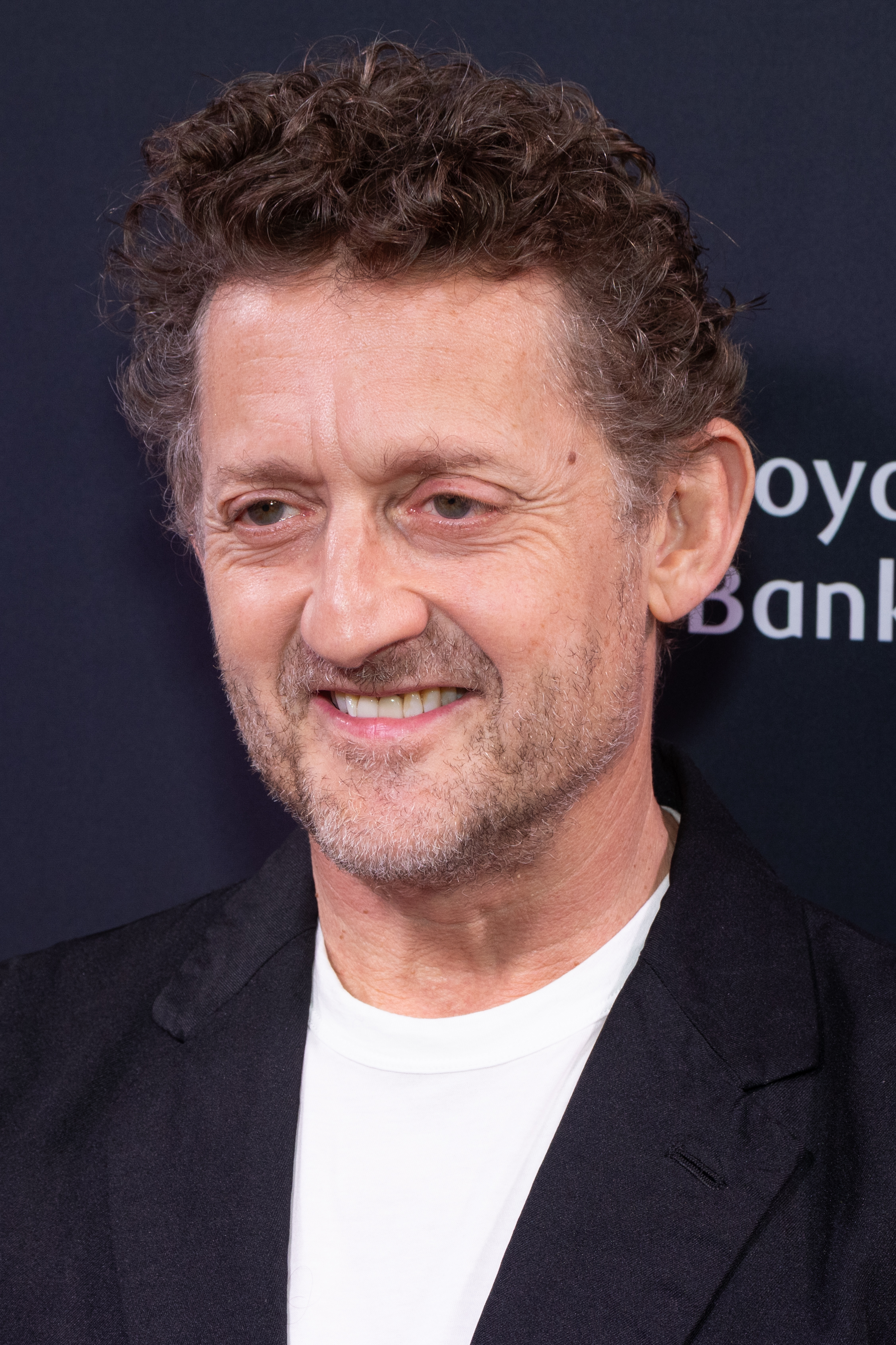
Winter at the 2025 Toronto International Film Festival

In April 2011, Winter's Bill & Ted co-star Keanu Reeves confirmed that a third installment of the film series was under way; the film was in development for most of the 2010s. Winter returned as Bill Preston in the film, Bill & Ted Face the Music, which was released on August 28, 2020; as the number one movie in North America and several countries internationally, with Reeves describing the plot as, "Basically, they're supposed to write a song to save the world and they haven't done that." In January 2024, Alex hinted about a possibility of a 4th film "Bill & Ted 4".

Winter's feature documentary The YouTube Effect, was produced in 2022 by Winter, in partnership with Gale Anne Hurd and Glen Zipper. The film premiered at Tribeca in June 2022, completed a sold-out theatrical run in July 2023, and was released worldwide on digital from Drafthouse Films.

In 2024, Winter produced and co-starred in the gonzo horror-comedy Destroy All Neighbors which premiered on Shudder and in limited theaters in January, 2024, and Absolute Dominion from director Lexi Alexander, and as the voice of Hefty Smurf in Paramount Pictures' animated movie, Smurfs.

Winter produced, directed and co-starred in the feature film Adulthood, starring Josh Gad, Kaya Scodelario, Billie Lourd and Anthony Carrigan. The film opened in theaters and digitally, in the fall of 2025, to positive reviews, following a world premiere at the Toronto International Film Festival, and garnering a nomination for Best Independent Film at the 2026 Saturn Awards.

Winter recently returned to Broadway, co-starring with Keanu Reeves in the hit revival of Waiting For Godot, directed by Jamie Lloyd. In 2026, Winter appeared in the movie, Primetime, from A24, by Lance Oppenheim and starring Robert Pattinson. Winter played Assistant District Attorney, Bill Conradt. In 2027, Winter is set to co-star and co-produce an Off-Broadway revival of Arthur Miller's play, Incident At Vichy.

== Personal life ==
Winter was married to Sonya Dawson, with whom he had a son, born in 1998. The couple later divorced. In 2010, he married Ramsey Ann Naito. They have two children. Winter maintains dual British and American citizenship.

In 2018, Winter revealed that he suffered "intense and prolonged" child sexual abuse at the hands of an older man while acting on Broadway as a child. Winter has said that he experienced PTSD due to the abuse, saying, "I had extreme PTSD for many, many years."

== Political views and activism ==
=== Technology and piracy ===
Winter began devoting a lot of his attention to online communities in the 1980s. Winter liked the idea of large numbers of anonymous users discussing a variety of topics in an anonymous space. "I found that really striking then. And it seemed liked the beginning of something." He has criticized media companies and news outlets for exaggerating how many people used Napster for digital piracy.

Winter's interest in technology, the Internet and privacy inspired him to make his celebrated documentaries about the rise of global movements online. In 2015, Winter gave a popular TED talk about the need for greater privacy and security in the digital age, in the face of powerful tech companies.

=== Activism against Elon Musk ===
In response to Elon Musk's activities with the Department of Government Efficiency, in February 2025, Winter helped initiate the Tesla Takedown movement, a peaceful protest held outside Tesla showrooms worldwide. He has stated that the intention was to be anti-Elon Musk and not Tesla. Winter, an avid electric-vehicle owner, called Musk a "toxic figurehead" for the company and set a goal with the protests to help educate people about Musk's nefarious activities and motivate the general public to protest.

=== Palestine ===
In October 2023, Winter signed an open letter by Artists4Ceasefire that called for a ceasefire in the Gaza war. In April 2024, Winter signed an open letter in support of Jonathan Glazer's Oscar speech for The Zone of Interest, in which he criticized the dehumanization of victims of the ongoing Gaza genocide.

In June 2025, Winter read out a letter by Mahmoud Khalil, an activist detained for his support of Palestinian rights, after he was released from custody. That September, Winter signed an open pledge with Film Workers for Palestine pledging not to work with Israeli film institutions "that are implicated in genocide and apartheid against the Palestinian people."

== Filmography ==
=== Director ===
==== Feature film ====
Year	Title	Director	Writer	Producer	Notes
1993	Freaked	Yes	Yes	Yes	Co-director with Tom Stern
1999	Fever	Yes	Yes	No	
2015	Smosh: The Movie	Yes	No	No	
2025	Adulthood	Yes	No	Yes	

==== Short film ====
Year	Title	Director	Writer	Producer	Notes
1984	NYU Sight & Sound Project	Yes	No	No	Co-director with Tom Stern
1985	Squeal of Death	Yes	Yes	Yes	Co-director with Tom Stern
1989	Aisles of Doom	Yes	Yes	No	Co-director with Tom Stern
1989	Bar-B-Que Movie	Yes	No	No	Co-director with Tom Stern
1990	Howie Meets the Ghost of Environmental Disasters Yet to Come	Yes	No	No	Co-director with Tom Stern
2016	Anyone Can Quantum	Yes	No	Yes	
2017	Trump's Lobby	Yes	No	Yes	

==== Television ====
Year	Title	Director	Writer	Producer	Notes
1991	The Idiot Box	Yes	Yes	No	6 episodes, Co-director with Tom Stern, co-writer of 1 episode: "The Best of the Idiot Box"
2003	Jimmy Kimmel Live!	Yes	No	No	Various segments
2005	Dirty Famous	Yes	No	No	
2005–07	The Andy Milonakis Show	Yes	No	No	
2007	Ben 10: Race Against Time	Yes	No	Yes	Television film
2009	Ben 10: Alien Swarm	Yes	No	Yes	Television film
2011	Blue Mountain State	Yes	No	No	Episodes "The Corn Field", "The Corn Field 2"
2011–13	Supah Ninjas	Yes	No	No	5 episodes
2012	Level Up	Yes	No	No	4 episodes
2013	Marvin Marvin	Yes	No	No	Episode "Mr. Earth"
2013	Betas	Yes	No	No	Episode "Show & Tell"
2014	Maker Shack Agency	Yes	No	No	Episode "Pilot"
2015	Bella and the Bulldogs	Yes	No	No	Episode "Tornado Afraido"
2015	Kirby Buckets	Yes	No	No	Episodes "Gimme Some Room", "All Hands on Dexter"
2016	Quantum Is Calling	Yes	No	Yes	Television film

==== Documentary works ====
Year	Title	Director	Writer	Producer	Notes
2012	Downloaded	Yes	Yes	Yes	
2015	Deep Web: The Untold Story of Bitcoin and the Silk Road	Yes	Yes	Yes	
2016	Relatively Free	Yes	No	Yes	Documentary short
2018	The Panama Papers	Yes	Yes	Yes	
2018	Trust Machine: The Story of Blockchain	Yes	Yes	Yes	
2020	Zappa	Yes	Yes	Yes	
2020	Showbiz Kids	Yes	Yes	Yes	
2023	The YouTube Effect	Yes	Yes	Yes	

==== Music videos ====
Year	Song	Artist	Notes
1989	"Knock Me Down"	Red Hot Chili Peppers	Co-director with Tom Stern
1989	"Taste the Pain"	Red Hot Chili Peppers	
1990	"Who's the Mack?"	Ice Cube	Co-director with Tom Stern
1990	"Me & Elvis"	Human Radio	Co-director with Tom Stern
1990	"Decadence Dance"	Extreme	Co-director with Tom Stern
1991	"Photograffitti"	Extreme	
1993	"The Jackal"	Ronny Jordan	
1994	"Milquetoast"	Helmet	
1994	"Wilma's Rainbow"	Helmet	
1995	"1 to 1 Religion"	Bomb the Bass feat. Carlton	
1995	"Verklemmt"	Foetus	
1996	"If 6 Was 9"	Axiom Funk	
1997	"Bug Powder Dust"	Bomb the Bass feat. Justin Warfield	
1997	"Exactly What You Wanted"	Helmet	
2003	"Talamanam Sound Clash"	Tabla Beat Science	Concert DVD, Co-director with Zane Vella

=== Actor ===
==== Feature film ====
Key
†	Denotes films that have not yet been released

Year	Title	Role	Notes
1985	Death Wish 3	Hermosa	
1987	The Lost Boys	Marko	Credited as 'Alexander Winter'
1987	Medium Rare	Timmy	
1988	Haunted Summer	John William Polidori	
1989	Bill & Ted's Excellent Adventure	Bill S. Preston, Esq.	
1989	Rosalie Goes Shopping	Schatzi Greenspace	
1991	Bill & Ted's Bogus Journey	Bill S. Preston, Esq. / Evil Robot Bill / Granny Preston	
1993	Freaked	Ricky Coogin	
1997	The Borrowers	TV Gangster	Cameo
1999	Fever	Subway passenger	Cameo
2013	Grand Piano	Assistant	
2015	Smosh: The Movie	Uncle Keith	
2019	In Search of Darkness	Himself (interviewee)	Documentary film
2020	Bill & Ted Face the Music	Bill S. Preston, Esq.	
2020	In Search of Darkness: Part II	Himself (interviewee)	Documentary film
2022	In Search of Tomorrow	Himself (interviewee)	Documentary film
2022	Blue's Big City Adventure	Cab Driver	
2024	Destroy All Neighbors	Vlad / Public Defender	
2025	Absolute Dominion	Dr. Jehuda Bruno	
2025	Adulthood	Doug Metzger	
2025	Smurfs	Hefty Smurf (voice)	
2026	Primetime	Bill Conradt	

==== Short film ====
Year	Title	Role	Notes
1984	NYU Sight & Sound Project	Geek	
1985	Squeal of Death	Howie / various characters	Aired on Night Flight and West Coast Cable
1989	Aisles of Doom	Grendel T.W. Ulcerous	Aired on Night Flight and West Coast Cable
1989	Entering Texas a.k.a. Bar-B-Que Movie	Mexican hitchhiker	Part of Stuart S. Shapiro's Impact Video Magazine
1990	Howie Meets the Ghost of Environmental Disasters Yet to Come	Howie	Part of Nigel Dick-directed Save the Planet: A CBS/Hard Rock Cafe Special

==== Television ====
Year	Title	Role	Notes
1985	The Equalizer	Jeffrey Sims	Episode: "Mama's Boy"
1990	Bill & Ted's Excellent Adventures	Bill S. Preston, Esq. (voice)	13 episodes
1991	The Idiot Box	Various roles	6 episodes
1993	Basic Values: Sex, Shock & Censorship in the 90's	Stinx on Ice	TV movie
2007	Ben 10: Race Against Time	Constantine Jacobs	TV movie
2007	Bones	Monte Gold	Episode: "The Girl in the Gator"
2007	Saul of the Mole Men	King Mole Man (voice)	5 episodes
2009	Ben 10: Alien Swarm	Nanomech (voice)	TV movie
2012, 2019	Robot Chicken	Bill S. Preston, Esq., Steve Burns, Earl the Lego Man (voice)	2 episodes
2018	Into the Dark	The Voice (voice)	Episode: "The Body"

==== Music videos ====
Year	Song	Artist	Notes
1989	"Knock Me Down"	Red Hot Chili Peppers	
1989	"Higher Ground"	Red Hot Chili Peppers	
1994	"Hard Act to Follow"	Brother Cane	

== Stage credits ==
Year	Show	Role	Venue	Notes	Ref.
1977–78	The King and I	Louis Leonowens	Uris Theatre, New York City	Replacement	
1979	The King and I	Louis Leonowens	US tour		
1979	Peter Pan	John Darling	US tour		
1979–81	Peter Pan	John Darling	Lunt-Fontanne Theatre, New York City		
1981	Close of Play	Matthew	Manhattan Theatre Club, New York City	US premiere	
2025	Waiting for Godot	Vladimir	Hudson Theatre, New York City		
