= Saturn Award for Best Independent Film =

Award presented to by the Academy of Science Fiction, Fantasy and Horror Films

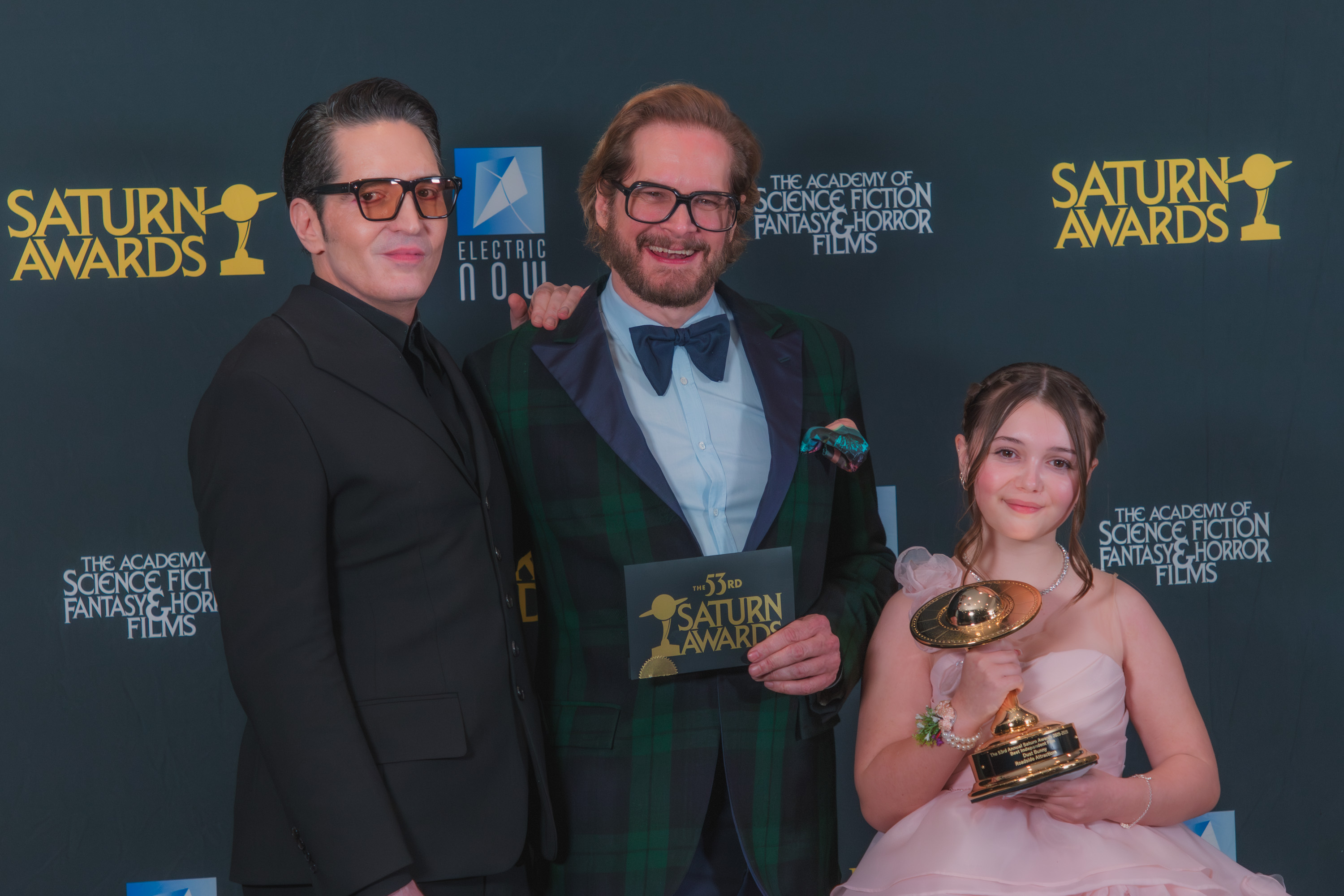
- The 2024/2025 recipients for Dust Bunny
- Awarded for: Best motion picture of the year released independently
- Country: United States
- Presented by: Academy of Science Fiction, Fantasy and Horror Films
- First award: 2012
- Currently held by: Dust Bunny (2024/2025)
- Website: www.saturnawards.org

The Saturn Award for Best Independent Film is an award presented to by the Academy of Science Fiction, Fantasy and Horror Films.

== Winners and nominees ==
=== 2010s ===
Year	Film
2012 (39th)	Killer Joe
2012 (39th)	Compliance
2012 (39th)	Hitchcock
2012 (39th)	The Paperboy
2012 (39th)	Robot & Frank
2012 (39th)	Safety Not Guaranteed
2012 (39th)	Seeking a Friend for the End of the World
2013 (40th)	12 Years a Slave
2013 (40th)	Great Expectations
2013 (40th)	Inside Llewyn Davis
2013 (40th)	The Invisible Woman
2013 (40th)	Out of the Furnace
2013 (40th)	Upside Down
2014 (41st)	Whiplash
2014 (41st)	Grand Piano
2014 (41st)	I Origins
2014 (41st)	A Most Violent Year
2014 (41st)	The One I Love
2014 (41st)	The Two Faces of January
2015 (42nd)	Room
2015 (42nd)	Bone Tomahawk
2015 (42nd)	Cop Car
2015 (42nd)	Experimenter
2015 (42nd)	99 Homes
2015 (42nd)	Trumbo
2016 (43rd)	La La Land
2016 (43rd)	Eye in the Sky
2016 (43rd)	Hunt for the Wilderpeople
2016 (43rd)	Lion
2016 (43rd)	The Ones Below
2016 (43rd)	Remember
2017 (44th)	Wonder
2017 (44th)	I, Tonya
2017 (44th)	LBJ
2017 (44th)	Lucky
2017 (44th)	Professor Marston and the Wonder Women
2017 (44th)	Super Dark Times
2017 (44th)	Wonderstruck
2018/2019 (45th)	Mandy
2018/2019 (45th)	American Animals
2018/2019 (45th)	Anna and the Apocalypse
2018/2019 (45th)	The Man Who Killed Hitler and Then the Bigfoot
2018/2019 (45th)	Ophelia
2018/2019 (45th)	Summer of 84
2018/2019 (45th)	The Tomorrow Man
2019/2020 (46th)	Encounter
2019/2020 (46th)	Angel of Mine
2019/2020 (46th)	The Aeronauts
2019/2020 (46th)	Color Out of Space
2019/2020 (46th)	Freaks
2019/2020 (46th)	Palm Springs
2019/2020 (46th)	Possessor

=== 2020s ===
Year	Film
2021/2022 (50th)	Dual
2021/2022 (50th)	Alice
2021/2022 (50th)	Dream Horse
2021/2022 (50th)	Gold
2021/2022 (50th)	Mass
2021/2022 (50th)	Watcher
2022/2023 (51st)	Pearl
2022/2023 (51st)	Aporia
2022/2023 (51st)	Brooklyn 45
2022/2023 (51st)	Fall
2022/2023 (51st)	Jules
2022/2023 (51st)	The Tutor
2023/2024 (52nd)	Late Night with the Devil
2023/2024 (52nd)	Dream Scenario
2023/2024 (52nd)	MaXXXine
2023/2024 (52nd)	The Substance
2023/2024 (52nd)	Thelma
2023/2024 (52nd)	The Thicket
2024/2025 (53rd)	Dust Bunny
2024/2025 (53rd)	Adulthood
2024/2025 (53rd)	Eden
2024/2025 (53rd)	Good Boy
2024/2025 (53rd)	The Plague
2024/2025 (53rd)	The Rule of Jenny Pen
2024/2025 (53rd)	The Toxic Avenger
