= Lee Arenberg =

American actor

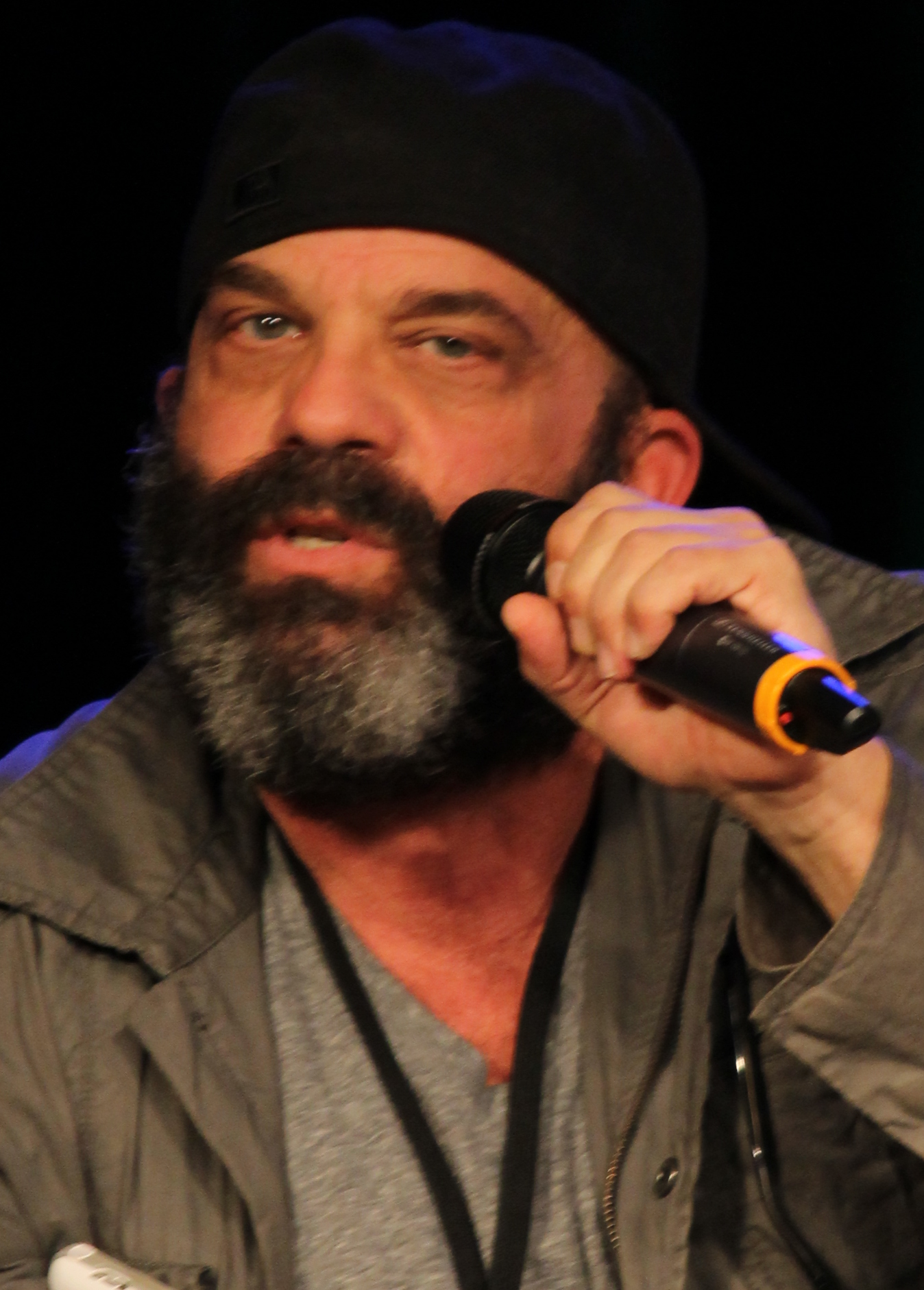
- Arenberg at the 2015 Magic City Comic Con
- Born: July 18, 1962 (age 64); Palo Alto, California, U.S.
- Occupation: Actor
- Years active: 1987–present
- Spouses: Lisa Derrick (m. 1999; div. 2006) Katie Meehan (m. 2007)

Lee Arenberg (born July 18, 1962) is an American actor. He is best known for his role as Pintel, one of Captain Barbossa's crew, in the Pirates of the Caribbean franchise. He also had a recurring role as the dwarf Grumpy in the television series Once Upon a Time. He attended UCLA as a theatre major.

== Career ==
Arenberg attended Santa Monica High School with future "brat pack" actors Sean Penn, Robert Downey Jr. and Emilio Estevez, and co-wrote a play with Estevez which was directed by Penn. Lee's first professional job was in 1986 at the Mark Taper Forum in Ghetto, a play directed by Gordon Davidson. Within weeks he was cast in three films, including the role of Norton in the feature Tapeheads (1988) opposite the film's co-stars Tim Robbins and John Cusack. Guest appearances on television began in 1987 with the hit sitcom Perfect Strangers (1986), and have continued with memorable roles such as the parking space-stealing New Yorker Mike Moffitt on Seinfeld (1992) and as the murderous rock promoter opposite Katey Sagal and Sam Kinison in Tales from the Crypt (1989), as well as roles on Arli$$ (1996), and Friends (1994). Arenberg can also be seen in the role of the well endowed studio head Bobby G. on the controversial short-lived Fox sitcom Action (1999) opposite series star Jay Mohr.

Arenberg has also guest starred on Star Trek: The Next Generation, Star Trek: Deep Space Nine, Star Trek: Voyager, and Star Trek: Enterprise. Coincidentally, in two of his appearances, ("The Nagus" and "United"), he played a character named Gral, one a Ferengi and the other a Tellarite. In 1992, Lee appeared on the TV series Night Court. Arenberg also played the recurring role of bookie Mike Moffitt in two episodes of Seinfeld. In "The Parking Space", he and George Costanza had a parking dispute, while in "The Susie" his thumbs were accidentally broken while trying to repair Jerry Seinfeld's car trunk.

He also guest starred in the fifth season of Friends in an episode titled "The One with the Inappropriate Sister". He guest starred on an episode of Brotherly Love entitled "Motherly Love". He had a bit part as a bumbling Hold-up Man in RoboCop 3. Lee also played Dr. Moyer in the Scrubs episode "My Own American Girl". He also starred as the dwarf Elwood Gutworthy in Dungeons & Dragons (2000), and the pirate Pintel in the Pirates of the Caribbean trilogy. He guest starred as "Hair Plugs" in Grounded for Life (2001). A graduate of Santa Monica High in 1980, he starred as the regular character "Grumpy/Leroy" on the hit ABC television series Once Upon a Time. As he confirmed when speaking at the Farpoint Star Trek Convention in Timonium, Maryland, Arenberg's character Pintel did not return in the fourth Pirates film.

Arenberg's face as skeletal Pintel from Pirates of the Caribbean: Curse of the Black Pearl, can be seen popping up in the treasure caves on Pirate's Lair on Tom Sawyer Island in Disneyland.

== Filmography ==
=== Film ===
Actor
Year	Film	Role	Director	Notes
1987	Cross My Heart	Parking Attendant	Armyan Bernstein	
1988	Tapeheads	Norton	Bill Fishman	
1989	The Wizard	Armageddon Registrar	Todd Holland	
1990	Brain Dead	Sacks	Adam Simon	
1990	Class of 1999	Marv the Technician	Mark L. Lester	
1992	Bob Roberts	Religious Zealot	Tim Robbins	
1993	RoboCop 3	Robber at donut shop	Fred Dekker	
1993	Freaked	The Eternal Flame	Alex Winter; Tom Stern	
1995	Waterworld	Djeng	Kevin Reynolds	
1997	Warriors of Virtue	Mantose	Ronny Yu	
2000	Dungeons and Dragons	Elwood	Courtney Solomon	
2003	Pirates of the Caribbean: The Curse of the Black Pearl	Pintel	Gore Verbinski	
2006	Pirates of the Caribbean: Dead Man's Chest	Pintel	Gore Verbinski	
2007	Pirates of the Caribbean: At World's End	Pintel	Gore Verbinski	
2007	Happily N'Ever After	Additional Voices	Paul J. Bolger	
2012	Mickey Matson and the Copperhead Conspiracy	Billy Lee	Harold Cronk	
2025	Chain Reaction	Frank	Michel Biel	Short
TBA	Last Train to Fortune	TBA	Adam Rifkin	Post-production

Producer
Year	Film	Director	Notes
2011	In the Gray	Rob Holloway	

Writer
Year	Film	Role	Director	Notes
2011	In the Gray	screenwriter	Rob Holloway	

=== Television ===
Year	Series	Role	Notes
1987	Perfect Strangers	Leon	Episode: "Night School Confidential"
1988	Sledge Hammer!	Buzzy	Episode: "Sledge, Rattle 'n' Roll"
1990	Tales from the Crypt	Marty Slash	Episode: "For Cryin' Out Loud"
1990, 1992	Night Court	Mr. Dijilly / Mr. Abraham	2 episodes
1991-1992	The Idiot Box	Various characters	4 episodes
1992	Live! From Death Row	Griffith	TV movie
1992	Roseanne	The Ghost of Hallowe'en Past	Episode: "Halloween IV"
1992, 1997	Seinfeld	Mike Moffitt	Episodes: "The Parking Space", "The Susie"
1993	Married... with Children	Sal	Episode: "Luck of The Bundys"
1993	Star Trek: The Next Generation	Prak	Episode: "Force of Nature"
1993	Star Trek: Deep Space Nine	Gral	Episode: "The Nagus"
1994	Star Trek: The Next Generation	Bok	Episode: "Bloodlines"
1995	Lois & Clark: The New Adventures of Superman	Major Domo	Episode: "Tempus, Anyone?"
1996, 1997, 1998, 2000	Arli$$	Various characters	4 episodes
1998	The Mr. Potato Head Show	Bullyboy	Episode: "Equal Writes"
1998	Friends	The Man	Episode: "The One with the Inappropriate Sister"
1999	Star Trek: Voyager	Pelk	Episode: "Juggernaut"
1999-2000	Action (TV series)	Bobby Gianopolis	Miscellaneous episodes
2000	Two Guys and a Girl	Mugger / Irene's Dad	Episode: "Once Again from the Beginning"
2000	Walker, Texas Ranger	Lester Squigman	Episode: "Faith"
2001	My Wife and Kids	Kevin Anderson	Episode: "Jay Gets Fired"
2003	Charmed	Unidentified Demon	Episode: "Oh My Goddess (Part 1)"
2003	Scrubs	Dr. Moyer	Episode: "My Own American Girl"
2005	Star Trek: Enterprise	Tellarite Ambassador Gral	2 Episodes
2008	Pushing Daisies	Arnaud Bailey	Episode: "Circus, Circus"
2010	The Iceman Chronicles	Judge Buttonwillow McKittrick	
2011	The Cape	Razer's Driver	Episode: "Razer"
2011	Good Luck Charlie	Nick, Skyler's Fake Dad	Episode: "Monkey Business"
2011–18	Once Upon a Time	Grumpy/Dreamy/Leroy	55 episodes
2013	Californication	Ken (Charlie's boss)	3 episodes
2013	Once Upon a Time in Wonderland	Leroy	Episode: "Down the Rabbit Hole"
2019	American Gods	Alviss	Episode: "The Ways of the Dead"

=== Video games ===
Year	Series	Role	Notes
2013	Disney Infinity	Pintel	Grouped under "Featuring the Voice Talents"
