= Farpoint Convention =

Science fiction convention series held in Maryland

- Status: Active
- Genre: Science fiction, Pop culture
- Venue: Delta Marriott Hunt Valley Inn
- Location: Hunt Valley, Maryland
- Country: United States
- Inaugurated: October 8th, 1993
- Organizer: Farpoint Foundation
- Filing status: Not for profit
- Website: farpointcon.com

Farpoint is an American science-fiction convention held since 1993 in Hunt Valley, Maryland. The convention is fan-run, differentiating it from larger, profit-making ventures, and organized by the 501(c)3 nonprofit Farpoint Foundation. Typical programming includes panel discussions, a competitive masquerade, fan videos, an art show, filking and celebrity guest appearances. It is a successor convention to ClipperCon (1984–1989) and OktoberTrek (1990–1992). The most recent Farpoint was held on February 7–9, 2025.

== OktoberTrek ==
OktoberTrek, a non-profit, fan-run convention from 1990 through 1992, was the immediate predecessor of Farpoint. It was organized by Sandy Zier-Teitler in Hunt Valley, Maryland.

Dates	Location	Attendance*	Notable Guests
October 12–14, 1990	Hunt Valley Inn	2000+	DeForest Kelley, Gates McFadden, David McDonnell
October 4–6, 1991	Hunt Valley Inn	2000+	Jonathan Frakes, Nichelle Nichols, LeVar Burton
October 9–11, 1992	Hunt Valley Inn	2000+	DeForest Kelley, Brent Spiner, Marc Okrand

== Locations and Dates ==
Dates	Location	Attendance*	Notable Guests
October 8–10, 1993	Marriott's Hunt Valley Inn	1,300	John DeLancie, June Lockhart, William Campbell
October 7–9, 1994	Marriott's Hunt Valley Inn	1,300	George Takei, Jonathan Brandis, Nana Visitor
October 6–8, 1995	Marriott's Hunt Valley Inn	1,200	Robert Picardo, John Fiedler
October 5–7, 1996	Marriott's Hunt Valley Inn	1,100	Michael Ansara, Tim Russ, Mark Goddard
October 4–6, 1997	Marriott's Hunt Valley Inn	1,500	Jonathan Frakes, Mira Furlan
November 1998	Omni in Baltimore	460	Stephen Furst, Robert O'Reilly
October 8–10, 1999	Marriott's Hunt Valley Inn	TBD	Peter Jurasik, James Darren, Robert Colbert, Mary Kay Adams
October 2000	Marriott's Hunt Valley Inn	TBD	Andreas Katsulas, Mary Kay Adams
2001**	N/A	N/A	N/A
February 15–17, 2002	Marriott's Hunt Valley Inn	876	George Takei, Robin Curtis, Philip Anglim
February 14–16, 2003	Marriott's Hunt Valley Inn	572	Armin Shimerman, Gil Gerard, Erin Gray
February 13–15, 2004	Marriott's Hunt Valley Inn	722	Tim Russ, Bill Mumy, Andrew Robinson
February 11–13, 2005	Marriott's Hunt Valley Inn	737	Jeffrey Combs, Wayne Pygram, Tony Amendola
February 17–19, 2006	Marriott's Hunt Valley Inn	708	Harve Bennett, Penny Johnson Jerald, Jack Stauffer
February 16–18, 2007	Marriott's Hunt Valley Inn	758	Ron Glass, Harve Bennett, Richard Hatch
February 15–17, 2008	Marriott's Hunt Valley Inn	774	James Callis, Erin Gray, Marina Sirtis
February 13–15, 2009	Crowne Plaza Baltimore North	799	Alan Tudyk, Philip Weyland, Harve Bennett
February 12–14, 2010	Crowne Plaza Baltimore North	744	Felicia Day, Lee Arenberg, Sam Witwer, Mira Furlan
February 18–20, 2011	Crowne Plaza Baltimore North	739	Laurie Holden, Tahmoh Penikett, Bonita Friedericy
February 17–19, 2012	Crowne Plaza Baltimore North	761	Michael Hogan, Kristin Bauer, Kate Vernon
February 15–17, 2013	Crowne Plaza Baltimore North	792	John Billingsley, Felicia Day, Lee Arenberg, Bonita Friedericy
February 14–16, 2014	North Baltimore Plaza Hotel	746	Alan Dean Foster, Phil LaMarr, Melissa McBride
February 13–15, 2015	North Baltimore Plaza Hotel	758	Timothy Zahn, Tim Russ, Colin Ferguson
February 12–14, 2016	North Baltimore Plaza Hotel	731	Sean Maher, John Morton
February 14–16, 2017	Radisson Baltimore Plaza Hotel	778	Enver Gjokaj, Sam Witwer, Nicholas Meyer
February 9–11, 2018	Delta Marriott Hunt Valley Inn	826	Matt Frewer, Nana Visitor, Timothy Zahn, Nora McLellan
February 8–10, 2019	Delta Hotel by Marriott Hunt Valley	837	Wallace Shawn, Maurice LaMarche, Rob Paulsen

*Attendance does not include dealers and guest numbers

**Convention was not held

== History ==
From 1993 to 1997, the convention was held in the Hunt Valley Inn. In 1998 the convention was held in the Baltimore Omni. After 1998, the convention went back to the Hunt Valley Inn until 2008. Farpoint was created by Beverly Ott Volker in early 1993. This convention was successor to other Beverly Volker creations such as Clippercon and Oktobertrek. The convention started in October 1993, which had over 1,300 attendees. The convention continued in October until October 2000 when the committee decided to move the convention to February. This decision caused there to be no 2001 convention because it would only be a four-month span without the convention. The date change coincided with the committee decision to feature fan interests prominently alongside the celebrity guests. Farpoint programming was moved into individual tracks that focus on fans' many interests: Authors/Writing, Science, New Media (fan-created podcasting/film/webcomics), Media (movies and television), Live Performances (theater/music/comedy), Costuming and Cosplay (Masquerade) and Youth/Children. In 2003, the convention was nicknamed "SnowPoint" because the guests, attendees, and committee found themselves locked in the Hunt Valley Inn due to a massive amount of snow. This was also Beverly Volker's last convention, as she died the May of that year. Due to rising prices, in 2009, Farpoint moved to the then Crowne Plaza of Baltimore North, currently named the Radisson Hotel North Baltimore. Due to issues with the hotel changing management so often in the past 5 years, and other issues with the hotel, the Convention moved again after the 2017 convention.

In 2018, the convention moved back to the Hunt Valley Inn, which itself has technically undergone yet another name change with ownership back to Marriott, and is now known as the Delta Hotels by Marriott Baltimore Hunt Valley. Most convention goers will still call it the Hunt Valley Inn. With the move back to the "Hunt Valley Inn", the normal weekend Farpoint usually was scheduled for in February, President's day weekend, was already taken by another customer in a multi-year contract, moving Farpoint to another weekend in February. As the convention continues to thrive, Farpoint may be able to regain their normal February weekend and take advantage of that three day weekend on President's Day.
