= Destroy All Neighbors =

2024 horror comedy film

- Promotional release poster
- Directed by: Josh Forbes
- Written by: Mike Benner; Jared Logan; Charles A. Pieper
- Produced by: Jonah Ray; Russell Sanzgiri; Alex Winter
- Starring: Jonah Ray; Randee Heller; Pete Ploszek; Kiran Deol
- Cinematography: Will Stone
- Edited by: Hank Friedmann
- Music by: Ryan Kattner; Brett Morris
- Production companies: Counterpart Pictures; RLJE Films; Shudder
- Distributed by: RLJE Films; Shudder
- Release date: January 12, 2024
- Running time: 85 minutes
- Country: United States
- Language: English

Destroy All Neighbors is a 2024 American splatter horror comedy film written by Mike Benner, Jared Logan and Charles A. Pieper and directed by Josh Forbes. Jonah Ray, Randee Heller, Pete Ploszek, Kiran Deol are the stars of the film with Russell Sanzgiri, Jonah Ray and Alex Winter serving as a producers. The plot follows a wannabe rock musician whose life becomes a living nightmare after he accidentally kills his noisy neighbor.

== Plot ==
William Brown is a sound engineer and aspiring musician who lives in a seedy apartment building with his girlfriend Emily. For the past three years, William has been obsessively working on a prog-rock album in his free time, yet he has struggled to find an audience for it. One day, after returning home from the recording studio where he works, William finds that he has a new neighbour; a mentally unstable Eastern European man named Vlad. Vlad quickly proves to be a major nuisance, constantly yelling, pounding on the walls and playing loud EDM music even at nighttime.

Eventually, William gets fed up of the noise, and goes to confront Vlad in his apartment. When he asks him to turn down his music, however, Vlad laughs at William and mockingly asks him to fight him, eventually leading to Vlad accidentally decapitating himself with his own makeshift home gym. Disturbed and unsure what to do, William decides to dismember Vlad's corpse and leave it in his bathtub. After he does so, however, Vlad inexplicably comes back to life, telling William that he now "lives in his head rent-free".

After trying and failing to dispose of Vlad's remains at a smelting plant, William is called into work by his boss. Upon arriving, Vlad causes William's van to drive over Auggie, a vagrant whom resides outside the recording studio. As Auggie dies, William realises that, much to his devastation, Auggie is actually "Swig" Anderson, one of his favourite musicians. However, as with Vlad, Auggie also inexplicably returns to life moments later.

William decides to leave Vlad and Auggie's bodies on the side of the road in the middle of the woods. After returning to his apartment, William finds that the apartment building manager, Eleanor, accidentally electrocuted herself to death whilst trying to fix a faulty fuse box. This makes William feel guilty since, earlier, Eleanor had asked him to help fix the fuse box due to him having more experience with electrical work, but he refused since he was busy trying to deal with Vlad's dismembered body. Meanwhile, tensions begin to arise between William and Emily, with the latter upset at the former for being more focused on his album than his relationship with her. After Emily leaves, William finds that Vlad and Auggie have returned, and ends up befriending them after they have a drunk party at Vlad's apartment.

William decides to show off one of his songs to Vlad and Auggie. Both men are highly impressed by the song, much to William's delight. However, Phillip, one of William's neighbours, then appears, and angrily demands that Will shut off his music. A fight ensues, leading to William killing Philip in self-defence. Later, William is brought over to the morgue to identify Eleanor's corpse. After Eleanor comes back from the dead, William, believing him to be responsible for her death, tearfully apologies to her. However, Eleanor tells William that it isn't his fault and, after the two sneak back to the apartment building, she offers to help him finish his album with the help of the other zombies. William is overjoyed and drives the zombies to the recording studio, where, despite some minor setbacks, they successfully manage to complete William's album.

== Cast ==
- Jonah Ray as William Brown
- Kiran Deol as Emily
- Randee Heller as Eleanor Prescott (building manager)
- Pete Ploszek as Alec
- DeMorge Brown as Phillip / Pig Man
- Kosher the Pig as Daryl
- Jon Daly as Swig Anderson
- Thomas Lennon as Scott
- Ryan Kattner as Caleb Bang Jansen
- Christian Calloway as Auggie
- Alex Winter as Vlad / Public Defender
- Madara Jayasena as Officer Ponds
- Franco Vega as Officer McCormick
- Chase Kim as Firefighter
- Kumail Nanjiani as Smelting Refinery Guard
- Phil Hendrie as Police Captain Entenille
- Deanna Rooney as SWAt Team Officer

== Production ==
The film production and casting was started in July 2022, and announced that Shudder and RLJE Films will distribute the film.

== Release ==
Shudder distributed the film and released on January 12, 2024.

== Reception ==
On the review aggregator website Rotten Tomatoes, 71% of 28 critics' reviews are positive, with an average rating of 5.8/10. Metacritic, which uses a weighted average, assigned the film a score of 53 out of 100, based on seven critics, indicating "mixed or average" reviews.

Kim Newman of Empire gave the film a rating of 3 over 5 and wrote, "The only film you'll see this year with a limbless torso playing drums with animated entrails, this wickedly witty take on the seamy side of creative ambition is well worth a spin."

2.5 over 5 rating was given by Meagan Navarro of Bloody Disgusting and she said, "Those on its wavelength won't mind the rough edges or underdeveloped themes in this raucous comedy filled with enough moments and character beats to compensate. But the flaws will only become more evident if this type of humor isn't for you."
