= Fever (1999 film) =

- Official poster
- Directed by: Alex Winter
- Written by: Alex Winter
- Produced by: Christian Martin
- Starring: Henry Thomas; David O'Hara; Teri Hatcher; Bill Duke
- Cinematography: Joe DeSalvo
- Edited by: Thom Zinny
- Music by: Joe Delia
- Release dates: May 16, 1999 (Cannes); May 22, 2001 (United States)
- Running time: 99 minutes
- Country: United States
- Language: English

Fever is a 1999 American psychological thriller independent film written and directed by Alex Winter, and starring Henry Thomas, David O'Hara, Teri Hatcher and Bill Duke.

== Plot ==
Nick Parker (Henry Thomas) is a struggling young artist suffering a mental and physical breakdown. When a violent murder happens in his apartment building, it pushes him to the edge of sanity. Suspected by his sister (Teri Hatcher) and tracked by a police detective (Bill Duke), Nick begins to think he may have committed the murder himself except for the appearance of a mysterious drifter (David O'Hara) who has moved in upstairs. Is he a witness or a murderer, and was it all a setup or illusion? The bottom line is: Who can you trust when you can no longer trust yourself?

== Cast ==
- Henry Thomas as Nick Parker
- David O'Hara as Will
- Teri Hatcher as Charlotte Parker
- Bill Duke as Detective Glass
- Sándor Técsy as Sidney Miskiewicz
- Irma St. Paule as Mrs. Rhula Miskiewicz
- Alex Kilgore as Adam Dennis
- Marisol Padilla Sánchez as Soledad
- Patricia Dunnock as Sophie Parker
- Helen Hanft as Louisa

== Reception ==
On the review aggregator website Rotten Tomatoes, 57% of 7 critics' reviews are positive.

- A.O. Scott in The New York Times: "Pure Hitchcockian panic. An arresting example of what a talented filmmaker can do with the sparest of means."
- Godfrey Cheshire in Variety: "An eerie, insinuating tale of urban dread and mental breakdown, [and] reps an impressively sophisticated solo directorial debut."
- Dennis Lim in the Village Voice: "With the director's impeccably chic expressionism and Henry Thomas's persuasive, dread-soaked performance, Fever sustains a convincingly spooky ambience throughout. Winter achieves a degree of technical polish rare among American independents."
- Phil Hall, Film Threat: "Mediocre thriller about a starving artist suspected of murder."

== Accolades ==
Official Selection, Cannes Film Festival, 1999.
