= Anthony Carrigan (actor) =

American actor (born 1983)

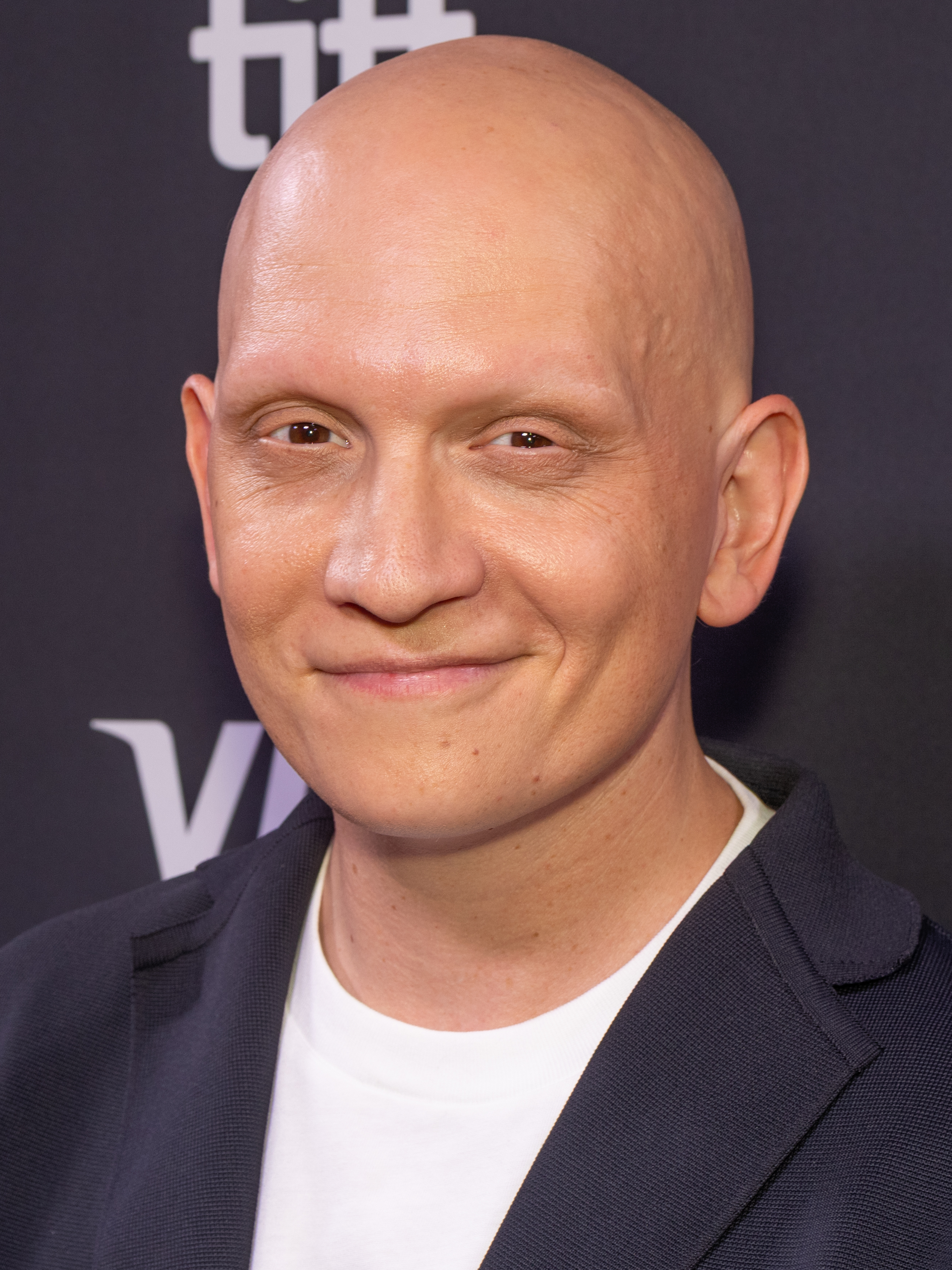
- Carrigan in 2025
- Born: January 2, 1983 (age 43); Winchester, Massachusetts, U.S.
- Education: Carnegie Mellon University (BFA)
- Occupation: Actor
- Years active: 2008–present
- Known for: The Forgotten; Gotham; Barry; Bill & Ted Face the Music; Fatherhood

Anthony Carrigan (born January 2, 1983) is an American actor. He is best known for playing Chechen mobster NoHo Hank in the HBO series Barry (2018–2023), for which he was nominated three times for the Primetime Emmy Award for Outstanding Supporting Actor in a Comedy Series in 2019, 2022, and 2023.

He is also known for playing Tyler Davies in the television series The Forgotten (2009–2010), Victor Zsasz in the Fox series Gotham (2014–2019), the robot Dennis Caleb McCoy in Bill & Ted Face the Music (2020), and Metamorpho in Superman (2025). In 2025, he also starred in the second season of the Peacock series Twisted Metal.

== Acting career ==
After early guest roles in series like Law & Order: Criminal Intent and Parenthood, Carrigan's first major role was as Tyler Davies in The Forgotten (2009–2010). He followed that by portraying recurring character Victor Zsasz in Gotham and main cast member NoHo Hank in Barry. He appeared as Metamorpho in Superman (2025), marking his entry into a major superhero franchise. He also appeared in the horror-comedy Death of a Unicorn as Griff the butler, which was directed and written by Alex Scharfman, and as Bodie Geller in the drama-comedy Adulthood which was directed by Alex Winter.

== Personal life ==
Carrigan grew up in Winchester, Massachusetts.

Carrigan has alopecia totalis, an autoimmune disease that causes hair loss. He has been working to encourage broader representation in Hollywood and advocating for greater acceptance of visible differences. Growing up, he had only small, manageable bald spots; however, in his twenties the hair loss became more prominent. Carrigan is now known for his complete lack of hair and is often typecast in villain roles. Carrigan advocates for awareness of alopecia areata, using his platform to promote individuality and acceptance in the entertainment industry.

In June 2018, Carrigan married professional chess player Gia Olimp.

== Filmography ==
=== Film ===
Year	Title	Role	Notes
2011	The Undying	Jason Donovan / Elijah Parmenter	
2016	Satanic	Anthony	
2018	The Toll Road	Darren	Short film
2020	Bill & Ted Face the Music	Dennis Caleb McCoy	
2021	Fatherhood	Oscar	
2022	Trick or Treat Scooby-Doo!	Trevor Glume / Farmer	Voice; Direct-to-video
2024	McVeigh	Frédéric	
2025	Death of a Unicorn	Griff	
2025	Superman	Rex Mason / Metamorpho	
2025	Adulthood	Bodie Geller	
2027	Spaceballs: The New One †	TBA	Post-production
TBA	The Stalemate †	TBA	Post-production

Key
†	Denotes films that have not yet been released

=== Television ===
Year	Title	Role	Notes
2008	Law & Order: Criminal Intent	H. Jack Walker III	Episode: "Legacy"
2008	Long Island Confidential	Jake	Television film
2009–2010	The Forgotten	Tyler Davies	17 episodes
2011	Parenthood	Cory Smith	5 episodes
2012	Hand of God	Jonathan	Television film
2013	Over/Under	Marino Puzzo	Television film
2014–2015	The Flash	Kyle Nimbus / Mist	2 episodes
2014–2019	Gotham	Victor Zsasz	20 episodes
2016	The Blacklist	Harris Holt	Episode: "The Vehm (No. 132)"
2018	Hard Sun	Mr. Weiss	Episode: "Sun Day"
2018–2023	Barry	NoHo Hank	Main cast
2020–2021	Animaniacs	Vladimir Putin	Voice; 3 episodes
2023	Captain Fall	Mr. Tyrant	Voice; 10 episodes
2025–present	Twisted Metal	Calypso	Main cast (season 2–present)

== Awards and nominations ==
Accolades for Anthony Carrigan
Year	Award	Category	Nominated Work	Result
2019	Primetime Emmy Awards	Outstanding Supporting Actor in a Comedy Series	Barry	Nominated
2019	Screen Actors Guild Awards	Outstanding Performance by an Ensemble in a Comedy Series	Barry	Nominated
2020	Screen Actors Guild Awards	Outstanding Performance by an Ensemble in a Comedy Series	Barry	Nominated
2020	Critics' Choice Awards	Best Supporting Actor in a Comedy Series	Barry	Nominated
2022	Primetime Emmy Awards	Outstanding Supporting Actor in a Comedy Series	Barry	Nominated
2023	Screen Actors Guild Awards	Outstanding Performance by an Ensemble in a Comedy Series	Barry	Nominated
2023	Screen Actors Guild Awards	Outstanding Performance by a Male Actor in a Comedy Series	Barry	Nominated
2023	Primetime Emmy Awards	Outstanding Supporting Actor in a Comedy Series	Barry	Nominated
2024	Screen Actors Guild Awards	Outstanding Performance by an Ensemble in a Comedy Series	Barry	Nominated
