= Ling Lun =

Legendary founder of music in Chinese culture

- Traditional Chinese: 伶倫
- Simplified Chinese: 伶伦
Transcriptions
Standard Mandarin
- Hanyu Pinyin: Líng Lùn
- IPA: [lǐŋ lwə̂n]
Yue: Cantonese
- Jyutping: ling4 leon4

Ling Lun (Chinese: 伶倫 or 泠倫, Linglun) is the legendary founder of music in ancient China.

== Mythology ==
In Chinese mythology, Ling Lun is said to have created bamboo flutes which made the sounds of many birds, including the mythical fenghuang. "In this way, Ling Lun invented the five notes of the ancient Chinese five-tone scale (gong, shang, jiao, zhi, and yu, which is equivalent to 1, 2, 3, 5, and 6 in numbered musical notation or do, re, mi, sol, and la in western solfeggio) and the eight sounds made by eight musical instruments. The Yellow Emperor (Huangdi) is said to have ordered the casting of bells in tune with those flutes.

An alternative text, the Lushi Chunqiu (Chinese: 吕氏春秋; lit. 'Annals of Master Lu'), from the third century BCE credits another culture hero, Kui—who is often confused with a one-legged mythical monster bearing the same name—with the invention of music. In one version of the story, Kui makes a drum by stretching animal skin over an earthen jar that defeats another monster. In another version, Yellow Emperor fashions a drum from the skin of a kui monster.

== Cultural legacy ==
In the computer games Civilization IV and Civilization V, Ling Lun appears as a great artist. The 2020 film Bill & Ted Face the Music features Ling Lun as one of the musicians in the titular characters' band, portrayed by Sharon Gee.
