= Ramsey Ann Naito =

American film producer

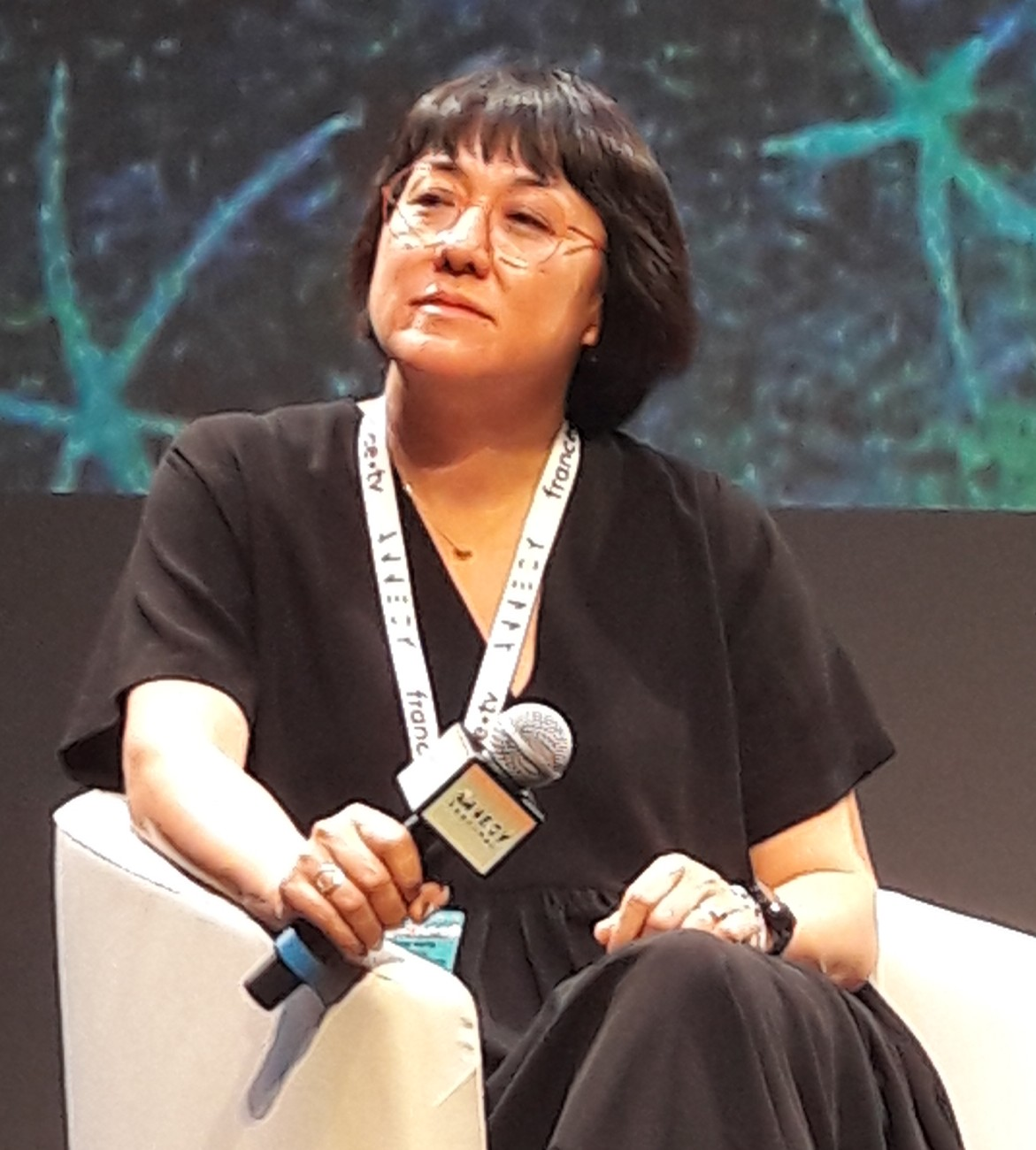
- Naito at the 2019 Annecy International Animation Film Festival
- Education: California Institute of the Arts
- Occupation: Film producer
- Years active: 1995–present
- Spouse: Alex Winter (m. 2010)
- Children: 3, including 1 stepson

Ramsey Ann Naito is an American producer of animated films who served as the president of Nickelodeon Animation and Paramount Animation (both subsidiaries of Skydance). She is best known for her 2017 production The Boss Baby; it earned her several awards and nominations including an Academy Award nomination for Best Animated Feature. Her mother was a painter and her Japanese father came from a long line of haiku artists.

In 2025, Naito stepped down as president of Nickelodeon Animation. Following mass layoffs at Paramount Skydance, Naito announced her departure as president of Paramount Animation.

== Filmography ==
=== Executive ===
- 2021–2025: President - Paramount Animation
- 2020–2025: President - Nickelodeon Animation
- 2018: Executive Vice President, Animation Production and Development - Nickelodeon
- 2018: Executive Vice President - Paramount Animation
- 2011: Producer - Blue Sky Studios
- 2005: Head of Movies - Cartoon Network
- 1998: Vice President - Nickelodeon Movies

=== Producer ===
- 2021: The Loud House Movie (executive producer - as Ramsey Naito)
- 2017: The Boss Baby (producer - as Ramsey Naito, produced by, p.g.a.)
- 2011: Level Up (TV Movie) (executive producer)
- 2010: Firebreather (TV Movie) (executive producer)
- 2009: Ben 10: Alien Swarm (TV Movie) (executive producer)
- 2009: Scooby-Doo! The Mystery Begins (TV Movie) (executive producer - uncredited)
- 2007: Ben 10: Race Against Time (TV Movie) (executive producer)
- 2006: Re-Animated (TV Movie) (co-producer)
- 2004: The SpongeBob SquarePants Movie (associate producer)

=== Production manager ===
- 2006: Barnyard (production executive)
- 2003: Rugrats Go Wild (production executive - uncredited)
- 2002: The Wild Thornberrys Movie (production executive - uncredited)
- 2002: Hey Arnold! The Movie (executive in charge of production)
- 2001: Jimmy Neutron: Boy Genius (production executive - uncredited)
- 2000: Rugrats in Paris: The Movie (unit production manager - uncredited)
- 1999: South Park: Bigger, Longer & Uncut (unit production manager)

=== Others ===
- 1998: The Rugrats Movie (supervising coordinator)
- 1997: Aaahh!!! Real Monsters (TV Series) (design coordinator - 5 episodes)
- 1995-1997: Duckman (TV Series) (production assistant - 5 episodes; production coordinator - 36 episodes)

== Accolades ==
Award	Date of ceremony	Category	Recipient(s) and nominee(s)	Result	Ref.
Academy Awards	March 4, 2018	Best Animated Feature	Tom McGrath and Ramsey Ann Naito	Nominated	
Annie Awards	February 3, 2018	Best Animated Feature	Ramsey Ann Naito	Nominated	
Producers Guild of America Award	January 20, 2018	Outstanding Producer of Animated Theatrical Motion Picture	Ramsey Ann Naito	Nominated	
San Diego Film Critics Society	December 11, 2017	Best Animated Film	The Boss Baby	Runner-up	
Satellite Awards	February 10, 2018	Best Animated or Mixed Media Feature	The Boss Baby	Nominated	
