= Freaked =

1993 American film

- Theatrical release poster
- Directed by: Alex Winter; Tom Stern
- Written by: Tim Burns; Tom Stern; Alex Winter
- Produced by: Harry J. Ufland; Mary Jane Ufland
- Starring: Alex Winter; Randy Quaid; William Sadler; Megan Ward; Michael Stoyanov; Bobcat Goldthwait; Mr. T; Brooke Shields
- Cinematography: Jamie Thompson
- Edited by: Malcolm Campbell
- Music by: Kevin Kiner; Paul Leary/Butthole Surfers; Blind Idiot God
- Distributed by: 20th Century Fox
- Release dates: April 24, 1993 (USA Film Festival); May 31, 1993 (Italy); October 1, 1993 (US)
- Running time: 82 minutes
- Language: English
- Budget: $12 million
- Box office: $29,296

Freaked is a 1993 American black comedy film directed by Tom Stern and Alex Winter, both of whom wrote the screenplay with Tim Burns. Winter also starred in the lead role. Both were involved in the short-lived MTV sketch comedy show The Idiot Box, and Freaked retains the same brand of surreal humour. Freaked was Winter's last feature film before he shifted to cameo and television films for two decades until 2013's Grand Piano.

Originally conceived as a low-budget horror film featuring the band Butthole Surfers, Freaked went through a number of rewrites, eventually developing into a black comedy set within a sideshow, which was picked up by 20th Century Fox for a feature film. After several poor test screenings and a change in studio executives who then found the film too "weird", the film was pulled from a wide distribution (except for Australia and Japan) and only played on two screens in the United States. It initially received mixed reviews from critics, but it has since gained a cult following.

== Plot ==
Skye Daley holds an interview with former child star Ricky Coogin, who recounts a bizarre story that began when he accepted an endorsement with the questionable Everything Except Shoes corporation to promote a fertilizer called "Zygrot 24". While initially hesitant, the corporation's CEO manages to get him on board with a large sum of money, and Ricky and his friend Ernie embark on a journey to a South American town called Santa Flan. During the flight, Ricky encounters a fan called Stuey Gluck who pleads him not to promote the fertilizer, but an accident leads to him falling out the plane.

Ricky and Ernie, upon arriving in Santa Flan, find themselves amidst a group of environmentalists protesting Zygrot, and Ricky becomes smitten with volatile environmentalist Julie. Ricky poses as an accident victim and deceives her into joining him and Ernie on a protest trip, but his true identity is eventually revealed and the three are stuck traveling together. They end up taking a detour to a local freakshow called Freek Land, where they encounter a mad scientist called Elijah C. Skuggs. The scientist and his assistant, Toad, capture them and turn the three into freaks, with Julie and Ernie becoming conjoined twins and Ricky partially transforming into a hideous green monster.

Ricky, struggling to adapt to his new life, finds himself among a group of fellow freaks including Ortiz the Dog Boy, giant arthropod Worm, literal anthropomorphic cow Cowboy, the Bearded Lady, and Sockhead. During their first show, Ricky stuns the audience with a Shakespearean monologue before spotting an E.E.S agent, leaping offstage in hopes of rescue. However, after the agent starts mocking him, an enraged Ricky pulls the agent's head off and scares the audience away.

The next day, Ricky learns that Stuey's alive and trying to sell his story, only for the fan to get captured by E.E.S. businessmen. Ricky then attempts to escape only to be captured by Elijah's henchmen, the Rastafar-eyes, and Elijah reveals that he plans to mutate Ricky and use him to eliminate the other freaks during the next show. Ricky, Worm, Julie and Ernie sneak off to Elijah's lab that night and make a 'good' batch of Zygrot that would keep him in control of himself, with hopes of using it to take down Elijah. However - when the tunnel they got to the lab using starts caving in - Ricky has to discard the batch so he can safely get back through. During a meeting between Elijah and the E.E.S. executives, though, Stuey manages to escape captivity and sneaks off with the good Zygrot.

At the show - Ricky strapped to a chair and the other freaks locked in a cage - Stuey attempts to get Ricky's attention only for a crowd member to pour the Zygrot over his head, turning him into a giant and grotesque troll-like version of himself. However, he remains determined to save Ricky and the other freaks, taking down the Rastafar-eyes and - with Julie and Ernie's help - killing Toad. Elijah uses the Zygrot on Ricky and fully transforms him into a huge monster, and he and Stuey engage in battle onstage. Meanwhile, the E.E.S. executives betray Elijah and attempt to steal his equipment, only for the latter to shoot them with a Zygrot bazooka. The agents and executives melt into a mass of liquid flesh, reforming into a giant, groaning fleshy shoe.

Ricky comes close to killing Stuey, only to snap out of it and spare him after Cowboy reminds him of their soulmate connection. He instead turns to Elijah, breaking his spine. Elijah states that if Ricky kills him, he will never find an antidote that was baked into some macaroons. The freaks had already found and consumed a batch of macaroons in an earlier throwaway gag. After he tells Ricky this, Ricky kicks him in the groin, sending him flying into a vat of Zygrot 24. An FBI task force arrive shortly afterwards having learned what was going on from Stuey's article, saving Ricky and the other freaks and gunning down Elijah, who emerges from the vat having taken the appearance of Skye Daley.

Cutting back to the interview, it is revealed that Ricky had returned to normal alongside the other freaks after they all took antidotes in the form of macaroons, excluding Stuey, Worm (who dislikes macaroons) and Ortiz (who had been chasing a squirrel the whole time). It is also revealed that the Skye Daley who had been interviewing him is actually Elijah, and he attempts to rise up again only to be gunned down by Julie and Ernie. Ricky and Julie share a kiss; Ricky, Julie, Ernie, Stuey, and the other former-freaks bid farewell to the audience, and the film ends on a frozen shot of Elijah rising behind them to attack again.

== Cast ==
- Alex Winter as Ricky Coogin
- Michael Stoyanov as Ernie
- Megan Ward as Julie
- Randy Quaid as Elijah C. Skuggs
- William Sadler as Dick Brian
- Alex Zuckerman as Stuey Gluck
- Keanu Reeves as Ortiz "The Dog Boy" (uncredited)
- Mr. T as The Bearded Lady
- Brooke Shields as Skye Daley
- Bobcat Goldthwait as "Sockhead"/Sock as Tourist
- Derek McGrath as "Worm"/Oxford Professor who studies worms
- Jeff Kahn as "Nosey"
- John Hawkes as "Cowboy"
- Lee Arenberg as "The Human Flame"
- Patti Tippo as Rosie "The Pinhead"
- Tim Burns as "Frogman"
- Ray Baker as Bill Blazer
- Jaime Cardriche as "Toad"
- Tom Stern as Milkman
- Jon M. Chu as Giant Stuey Monster
- Michael Gilden and Joseph S. Griffo as "Eye N. Eye"
- Calvert DeForest (credited as Larry "Bud" Melman) as himself
- Gibby Haynes as Cheese Wart
- Morgan Fairchild as Pan Am Stewardess
- Eduardo Ricard as George Ramirez
- Henry Carbo, Deep Roy and Michu Meszaros as Mutant George Ramirez
- Nicholas Cohn as Bob Vila look-a-like

== Production ==
The film, under the working title of Hideous Mutant Freekz, was conceived around the time Winter and Stern had directed 1988's Bar-B-Que Movie, a short film starring and featuring the music of experimental rock band Butthole Surfers. Winter, Stern and Surfers frontman Gibby Haynes began work on the first draft of the script, envisioning it as an obscene, ultra-violent horror film once again featuring the Butthole Surfers, costing around $100,000. The idea was, as Alex Winter put it, "Beach Blanket Bingo meets The Evil Dead." The two fished the script around to various studios for years, but to no avail.

Following the end of production on Stern and Winter's MTV sketch comedy show The Idiot Box, co-writer Tim Burns was recruited to join the two in a number of rewrites. The film was completely revised, dropping the aspect of the Butthole Surfers entirely and turning it into a full comedy in the vein of the Monty Python and MAD Magazine-inspired humour that was present in The Idiot Box.

Winter and Stern pitched the idea to 20th Century Fox. Joe Roth, the head of the studio at that time, loved the idea and offered the two a twelve million dollar deal to direct it, despite the fact that neither of them had any experience directing a major Hollywood film and had never even shot on 35mm film before. The only condition was that the film had to be rewritten and toned down to fit a PG-13 rating; therefore most of the profanity was written out of the final draft to fit MPAA standards. Within a month of being picked up, the film began production.

The makeup effects requirements for the film were so substantial, and the lead time before filming was so short, the makeup effects characters for the film were designed and created by three different companies: Tony Gardner's company Alterian, Inc., Steve Johnson's XFX, Inc., and Screaming Mad George's Studio.

20th Century Fox had such high expectations for the film that they released a number of products based on it, including a line of action figures, a novelization and, most notably, a comic book released by Hamilton Comics (however, since the comic was drawn before most of the casting was completed, none of its characters look anything like their real-life counterparts). Four resin figures were sold at Spencer Gifts and Suncoast Motion Picture Company.

According to Winter, Jackass star Johnny Knoxville served as a production assistant on the film, and posed in full makeup as Ortiz the Dog Boy for a group photograph on a day when Keanu Reeves was unavailable.

=== Complications ===
During filming, Joe Roth left as studio head for Caravan Pictures and was replaced with Peter Chernin by Rupert Murdoch, who did not like the film nor the fact that twelve million dollars was being invested in it. Chernin cut the film's post-production budget, thus forcing a lot of the soundtrack (including a demo song that Iggy Pop had recorded for the closing credits) and special effects to be greatly cut down or eliminated altogether. The film's title was changed, as well, from the poorly received "Hideous Mutant Freekz" to the supposedly more accessible "Freaked," a title neither Winter nor Stern much cared for.

After several poor test screenings, Fox chose to pull the film from a nationwide release and cut its advertising budget, leaving no money for commercials or newspaper ads. Freaked had its official premiere at the Toronto International Film Festival on September 11, 1993. Despite initial positive critical response, the film opened October 3, 1993 in the United States on only two screens, making a mere $6,957 in its first weekend. It grossed less than $30,000 during its theater run and was released on VHS on April 20, 1994.

== Reception ==
Freaked received a mixed response from critics. Entertainment Weekly described the film as "having more laughs than a month of Saturday Night Live," The New York Times hailed it as one of the top comedies of the nineties. Alternatively, Variety criticized the film, claiming "the filmmakers simply try too hard to displease," while Time Out New York stated "the sum is worse than it's [sic] (very ugly) parts." The movie currently holds a 58% rating on Rotten Tomatoes based on 19 reviews. Metacritic assigned the film a score of 58 out of 100, based on 12 critics, indicating "mixed or average" reviews.

Freaked eventually went on to win two awards: the Grand Prize at the 1995 Gérardmer Film Festival and Best Actor (for "The Creatures of the Film") at the 1994 Fantafestival. The film was also nominated for a Saturn Award for Best Make-up.

== Home media ==
On July 12, 2005, Anchor Bay Entertainment and 20th Century Fox released a special-edition two-disc DVD, featuring extra material, including deleted scenes, audio commentary, behind-the-scenes footage and two short films from Alex Winter and Tom Stern, the 15-minute film noir parody Squeal Of Death and a black-and-white skit titled NYU Sight & Sound Project.

On August 6, 2013, Anchor Bay and Starz Inc. released the movie on Blu-ray. The Blu-ray does not include any of the bonus features from the DVD release. Both the Blu-ray and DVD are out print and considered to be collector's items.

On June 6, 2025, it was announced that Drafthouse Films acquired the rights to the film from 20th Century Studios and Disney and that Australian label Umbrella Entertainment provided a promotional trailer for a restoration released on 4K UHD on November 5, 2025. The film became available on streaming stateside on October 7, 2025.

== Soundtrack ==
A soundtrack release for Freaked was planned, but following the loss of their post-production budget, the idea never came to fruition. The score was composed by Kevin Kiner, with additional music by Paul Leary and Butthole Surfers, and Blind Idiot God. In 2020, Death Waltz Recording Co. released the soundtrack and score as a physical LP. The songs featured in the film were as follows:

- "Freaked" - Henry Rollins and Blind Idiot God
- "Gumby Jack Flash" - Paul Leary
- "Rip/Stop" - Blind Idiot God
- "Butter Queen" - Butthole Surfers
- "Hideous Mutant Freekz" - Parliament Funkadelic and Bill Laswell
- "Sweat Loaf" - Butthole Surfers
- "Freekz! (That's What They Call Us!)" - Mark Evans, Mark Free, and Greg Welchel
- "Midget Man Skank" - Blind Idiot God
- "Cha Bump" - Bald Bill Hagan and His Trocaderons
- "Gluehead Stomp" - Blind Idiot God
- "'The Murder" (from Psycho) - Bernard Herrmann
