= Harve Bennett =

American screenwriter, producer (1930–2015)

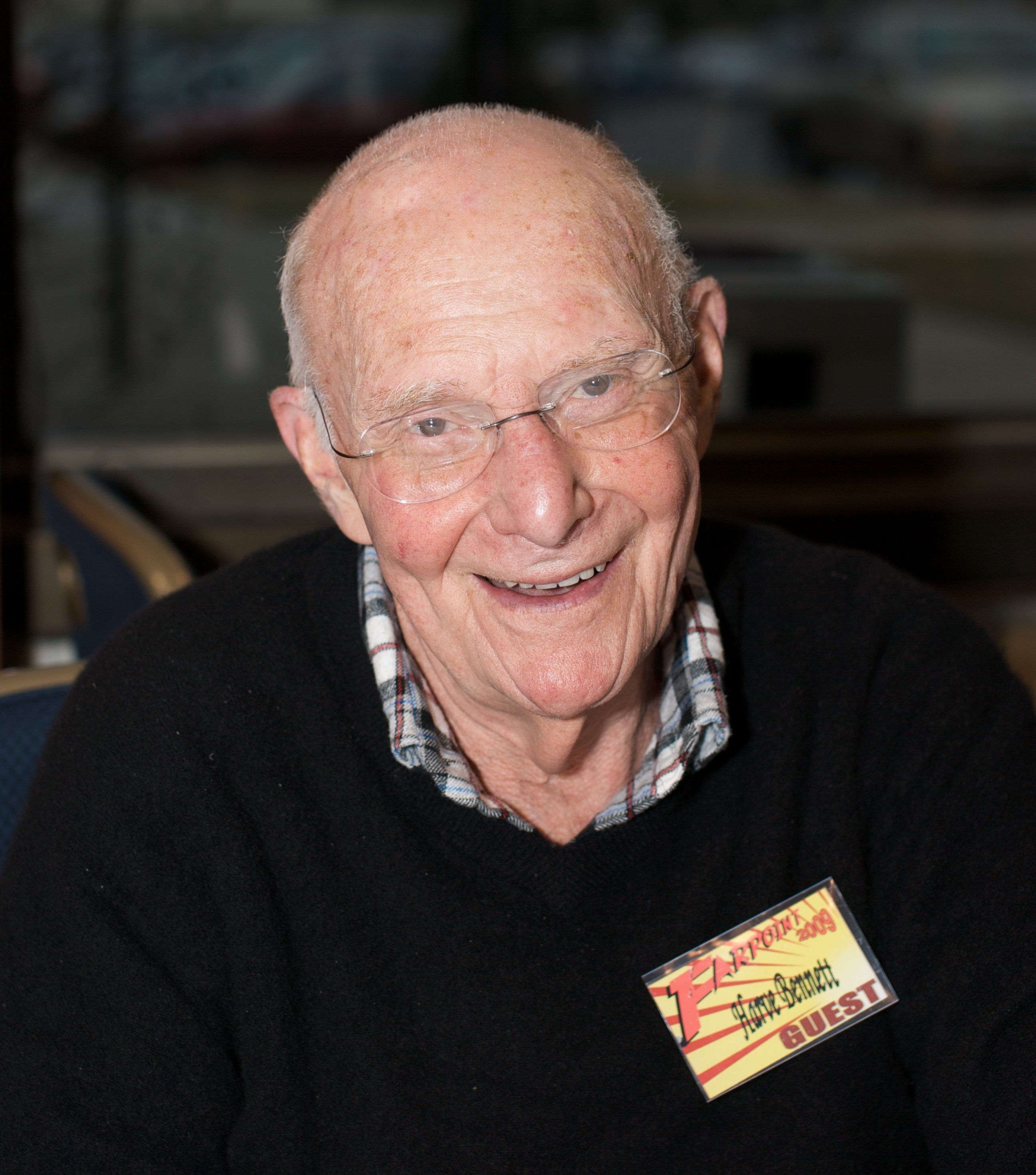
- Bennett on at Farpoint Convention on February 14, 2009
- Born: Harvard Bennett Fischman; August 17, 1930; Chicago, Illinois, U.S.
- Died: February 25, 2015 (aged 84); Medford, Oregon, U.S.
- Resting place: Willamette National Cemetery
- Education: University of California, Los Angeles
- Occupations: Television producer; Film producer; Screenwriter
- Years active: 1955–1998
- Known for: Star Trek (films)

Harve Bennett (born Harvard Bennett Fischman; August 17, 1930 – February 25, 2015) was an American television and film producer and screenwriter.

== Early life ==
Bennett was born to a Jewish family in Chicago, Illinois, in 1930, the son of Kathryn (née Susman), a journalist, and Yale Fischman, a lawyer. As a young boy, Bennett appeared on the radio program Quiz Kids, which introduced him to show business. By the time Bennett had reached college age, the radio business was in decline, and he turned to the world of film. He entered the University of California, Los Angeles and graduated from their film school. Following his graduation from college, in 1953 Bennett joined the United States Army. He served in the Military Police Corps, based at the United States Disciplinary Barracks in Lompoc, California. He was honorably discharged in 1955 with the rank of corporal.

== Career ==
=== Early work ===
Bennett then began his entertainment career as a production executive. He first worked at CBS in New York City and later moved to the programming department of ABC, becoming Vice President of Daytime Programming. At ABC, he rose to become Vice President of Programming for a time.

Following his work with ABC, Bennett moved over to production. His first project was to develop a television series with producer Aaron Spelling called The Mod Squad, which Bennett produced from 1968 until 1973.

Following The Mod Squad, Bennett joined Universal Studios where he produced a variety of television series and miniseries. The best known of these series are probably The Six Million Dollar Man (1973–78) and The Bionic Woman (1976-78). Other series and miniseries he produced at Universal include Rich Man, Poor Man (1976), The Invisible Man (1975) and Gemini Man (1976).

Bennett then moved to Columbia Pictures Television where he continued as a television producer, along with MGM TV employee Harris Katleman, which was joint partner from 1977 to 1980. His projects at Columbia Pictures included the series Salvage 1 (1979) and the miniseries The Jesse Owens Story (1984).

While working at Columbia Pictures TV, Bennett was also brought to Paramount Pictures to work in their television division producing television series. One of his first productions for Paramount was a television miniseries for Paramount Domestic Television, A Woman Called Golda (1982), which was Ingrid Bergman's final role and which co-starred Leonard Nimoy.

=== Star Trek ===
In 1980, only a few weeks into his contract with Paramount, Bennett was called to a meeting with then top executives of Paramount Barry Diller and Michael Eisner, along with Charles Bluhdorn who was then head of Paramount's parent Gulf+Western. Bluhdorn, dissatisfied with the results of Star Trek: The Motion Picture, was looking for someone new to take over the next film in the series.

According to Bennett, Bluhdorn asked him what he thought of the first Star Trek film and, after Bennett said he found it boring, Bluhdorn asked him if he could make a better picture and if he could do it for less than $45 million (the eventual budget of the first film). When Bennett said that he could, Bluhdorn said "do it" and he was hired.

To prepare for the job of producing a Star Trek film, Bennett first screened all 79 episodes of the original Star Trek series in a projection room at Paramount. He was particularly drawn to the episode "Space Seed," which featured Ricardo Montalbán as the genetically enhanced supervillain Khan Noonien Singh. At the conclusion of the episode, Khan and his followers are exiled to an uninhabited planet, and James T. Kirk and Spock wonder what will become of them. This gave Bennett the 'hook' he was looking for, and led him to develop a sequel to the episode.

Bennett's idea formed the beginnings of what would become The Wrath of Khan. Bennett himself developed the original story premise, and then worked with screenwriter Jack B. Sowards on the early drafts of the screenplay. Nicholas Meyer was later introduced to Bennett and completed the final drafts of the script, in addition to directing the film with Bennett as executive producer and Robert Sallin as producer. Star Trek II proved to be an enormous success, both in terms of the box office performance and fan response.

Following the success of Star Trek II, Bennett served as producer on the next three Star Trek films: The Search for Spock, The Voyage Home—which for a long time stood as one of the most successful of the Star Trek films—and The Final Frontier. In addition to serving as producer, Bennett also wrote Star Trek III, co-wrote the story and screenplay for Star Trek IV, and co-wrote the story for Star Trek V. Bennett also made cameo appearances in Star Trek III (as the voice of the flight recorder) and Star Trek V (as a Starfleet Chief of Staff Admiral who gives Captain Kirk his orders).

Following Star Trek V, Bennett developed an idea for a sixth Star Trek film that would take a different approach from the previous films. Titled "The Academy Years", it would have focused on the characters of Kirk and Spock when they were much younger and cadets at Starfleet Academy. It would have delved into the early relationships between these characters, and shown how they developed such a close friendship over the years. While William Shatner and Leonard Nimoy would have had cameos at the beginning and end of the film to "bookend" the story in flashback form, new actors would have portrayed most of the roles in the film, including the young Kirk and Spock.

Although Paramount was initially enthusiastic about the idea, feedback from fans was almost universally negative over a Star Trek film without the established actors that fans had come to know and love. Also, Martin Davis, who at the time was the head of Gulf & Western, wanted a film featuring the original cast to mark Star Trek's 25th anniversary in 1991. Paramount offered Bennett the opportunity to produce this film with the original cast, even offering to produce his academy film afterward, but Bennett declined, citing multiple reasons including a lack of story ideas for the requested film and the rushed time frame in which the film would have to be completed in order to coincide with Star Trek's 25th anniversary.

This marked the end of Bennett's association with the Star Trek franchise, and shortly thereafter he left Paramount. The sixth Star Trek film was later titled Star Trek VI: The Undiscovered Country and was released in movie theaters on December 6, 1991.

== Later works ==
After producing the Star Trek films, Bennett wrote the television movie Crash Landing: The Rescue of Flight 232 (1992) He co-created and produced the science-fiction television series Time Trax (1993–1995), and produced the animated miniseries Invasion America (1998), for which Nimoy was a voice actor.

== Death ==
Bennett died on February 25, 2015, in Medford, Oregon, due to a burst embolism in his small intestine and a second one found in his lung. His death occurred two days before that of Leonard Nimoy. He was interred at the Willamette National Cemetery.

== Filmography ==
| Year | Title | Role | Notes |
|---|---|---|---|
| 1982 | Star Trek II: The Wrath of Khan | Battle simulator computer | Voice, uncredited |
| 1984 | Star Trek III: The Search for Spock | Flight Recorder | Voice |
| 1989 | Star Trek V: The Final Frontier | Starfleet Chief of Staff | |
