= Zappa (2020 film) =

- Film poster
- Directed by: Alex Winter
- Produced by: Alex Winter; Glen Zipper; Mike J. Nichols
- Cinematography: Anghel Decca
- Edited by: Mike J. Nichols
- Music by: John Frizzell
- Production companies: Trouper; Zipper Bros Films; Roxbourne Media Limited
- Distributed by: Magnolia Pictures
- Release date: November 27, 2020
- Running time: 127 minutes
- Country: United States
- Language: English

Zappa is an American documentary film about the musician Frank Zappa. Directed by Alex Winter, it was released on November 27, 2020.

Frank Zappa (1940–1993) was an American composer, bandleader, and guitarist. Best known for writing and performing a large body of unconventional rock music and releasing many albums, his work combined multiple music genres. He held iconoclastic views about music, the music industry, and American culture and politics.

The Zappa documentary tells the story of his life and career. Director Alex Winter had free access to Zappa's extensive archives. The film includes footage of performances by Zappa and his various bands, as well as many interviews of people who knew or worked with him. In addition to Zappa himself, the interview subjects include Bruce Bickford, Pamela Des Barres, Bunk Gardner, Mike Keneally, Scott Thunes, Ian Underwood, Ruth Underwood, Steve Vai, Ray White, and Gail Zappa.

== Reception ==
Zappa was nominated for a Critics' Choice Award for Best Music Documentary.

On the review aggregator website Rotten Tomatoes, 96% of 71 critics' reviews are positive, with an average rating of 7.6/10. The website's consensus reads: "As rich and complex as its subject's best work, Zappa honors the life and career of a musical legend without falling into hagiography." Metacritic, which uses a weighted average, assigned the film a score of 76 out of 100, based on 16 critics, indicating "generally favorable" reviews.

Peter Sobczynski of RogerEbert.com gave the film three and a half out of four stars and wrote, "Zappa contains maybe two real flaws. While some of Zappa's lyrics have been criticized for being sexist and puerile—this is the guy who wrote the deathless classic 'Don't Eat The Yellow Snow'—that aspect of his musical output is pretty much glossed over. The other problem is that the lack of any full performances of his songs will not exactly bolster the case for his musical genius among those who do not already lean in that direction. Other than that, the film is a complex and surprisingly satisfying portrait of an artist who defiantly marched to the beat of a different drummer (or two)."

Owen Gleiberman of Variety wrote, "When Winter takes on a subject like this one, he doesn't just explore it; he surrounds and penetrates it. Yet what surprised me about Zappa — it's the source of its emotional power — is that the movie insists on seeing Frank Zappa not from the outside but, rather, in the way that he saw himself: as a deadly serious and obsessive aesthete-musician in freak's clothing, a man consumed by breaking out of what he viewed as the shackling boundaries of the pop-music business."
