= Invasion America =

1998 American TV series or program

- Genre: Science fiction
- Created by: Steven Spielberg; Harve Bennett
- Voices of: Mikey Kelley; Lorenzo Lamas; Tony Jay; Edward Albert; Leonard Nimoy
- Composer: Carl Johnson
- Country of origin: United States
- No. of episodes: 13

Production
- Executive producers: Steven Spielberg; Harve Bennett
- Producers: Dan Fausett; Michael Reaves
- Running time: 22 minutes
- Production company: DreamWorks Television Animation

Original release
- Network: The WB
- Release: June 8 – July 7, 1998

Invasion America is an American animated science fiction television series that aired in the prime time lineup on The WB from June 8 to July 7, 1998. Produced by DreamWorks Television Animation (then part of DreamWorks proper, now owned by Universal Studios), the series was created by Steven Spielberg and Harve Bennett, who also served as executive producers.

The show involves an attempt by aliens from the planet Tyrus to overthrow the Earth.

== Plot ==
The story of Invasion America begins in the early 1980s, when humanoid aliens from the planet Tyrus begin to initiate their plans for making contact with Earth. Cale-Oosha, the ruler of Tyrus, looks into his uncle's project with Earth. However, his uncle, The Dragit, claims that their dying planet ought to invade Earth and take hold of its resources. Cale refuses, and a civil war breaks out.

Cale and Rafe, his bodyguard, trainer, and trusted friend, escape to Earth, disguising themselves as humans. Cale meets Rita Carter, a human woman; he falls in love with her, and they marry. After a long time of running from the Dragit's forces on Earth, Cale returns to Tyrus to help strengthen his loyalist forces, the Ooshati, leaving Rita and their young son, David, under Rafe's protection.

In the present day, when the Dragit finally finds the family, he is determined to kill them, and David Carter's teenage life is thrown into a devastating adventure of stopping the Dragit, losing and gaining friends, and finding out just who he is.

== Characters ==
- David Carter (Oosha) (voiced by Mikey Kelley) - A teenage human-Tyrusian hybrid who is descended from Tyrusian royalty, making him the future ruler of Tyrus. David lost his house, his mother and his possessions, and learned the truth of his identity all in one night. He utilizes the Exotar, a glove that enhances his Tyrusian powers and helps him control them.
- Rafe (voiced by Edward Albert) – An Tyrusian and the commander of the Ooshati. He operates undercover as a county sheriff in Glenport and was entrusted with watching over David and his mother. After rescuing David from a group of captors, Rafe is asked to lead an attack on the Dragit's headquarters on Earth. After this attack, Rafe is mortally wounded by a stowaway Mangler. Before dying, he gives encouragement to David and passes on the task of saving the world.
- Rita Carter (Ooshala) (voiced by Kath Soucie) – David's human mother. She is a kind woman who saved Cale from death and eventually married him. Rita disappears after the Tall Men invade her house, with her fate left unknown.
- Cale-Oosha (voiced by Lorenzo Lamas) – David's Tyrusian father, and the true ruler of Tyrus. After years on the run, he leaves his family under Rafe's protection to help his band of loyalist forces, the Ooshati, in their war against the Dragit.
- The Dragit (voiced by Tony Jay) – A Tyrusian who is the ruler of Tyrus and great-uncle of David. He is the series' main antagonist; throughout the series, he tries to brainwash David into joining his side or have him killed.
- Major Philip "Phil" Stark (voiced by Greg Eagles) – An intelligence officer and an OH-6A Cayuse pilot. He has a heart for David and cares for his safety, going around his orders to help him out.
- Sergeant Angela "Angie" Romar (voiced by Kristy McNichol) – Stark's partner and friend. She is of Romani descent and gives Stark advice and ideas.
- Jim Bailey (voiced by Rider Strong) – David's best friend. He accompanies him into outer space at the series' end.
- Doc (voiced by Ronny Cox) – A Tyrusian who was once positioned in Charles Air Force Base, but deserted upon hearing of the Dragit's attempt to assassinate Cale and "went native". Now an old man living in the Utah desert, Doc taps into the Dragit's information network to help David after initially refusing to become involved.
- Blue – Doc's pet Mangler. Like Doc, Blue is a survivor of the attempted assassination of Cale-Oosha. Doc tamed Blue, who has quite an appetite for steak.
- General Konrad (voiced by Leonard Nimoy) – A Tyrusian and Air Force general who is the leader of the Dragit's agents on Earth. After the destruction of Charles Air Force Base, he tries to kill David and Rafe, but is killed in a plane crash.
- General Gordon (voiced by James Sikking) – Gordon is a colonel who becomes a general after Konrad is killed. Gordon directs Stark and Romar's missions when the two agents become suspicious.
- Major Lomack (voiced by Jim Cummings) – A humanoid alien from the planet Chaon with the ability to transform into a large fearsome creature. In his true form, Lomack is resistant to bullets and other weapons.
- Simon Lear (voiced by Thom Adcox-Hernandez) – A human/Tyrusian hybrid like David, he and his sister are bounty hunters working for General Gordon who attempts to capture David. He and his sister are their mother's only successful attempt at blending the two species' DNA. Simon often resorts to killing without thought.
- Sonia Lear (voiced by Kath Soucie) – Simon's twin sister, a human/Tyrusian hybrid like David and fellow bounty hunter, also after David. She keeps Simon under control through Tyrusian psychic bonding; in turn, she loses her nerve and sense of violence without him.
- Dr. Hazel Lear (voiced by Jennifer Darling) – Sonia and Simon's "mother," a geneticist who, for years, tried to combine the genes of Tyrusians and humans with mostly failed results.

== Episodes ==
Invasion America consisted of 13 half-hour episodes, and was shown as five one-hour segments and one hour-and-a-half segment for the final episode.

No.	Overall title	Episode titles	Directed by	Written by	Original release date
1	"The Legend"	"The Legend"	Dan Fausett	Harve Bennett; Michael Reaves	June 8, 1998
2	"The Legend"	"The Son"	Dan Fausett	Harve Bennett; Michael Reaves	June 8, 1998
3	"Assault"	"Flight"	Dan Fausett	Ruel Fischmann	June 9, 1998
4	"Assault"	"Assault"	Dan Fausett	Wayne Lemon	June 9, 1998
5	"Renewal"	"Renewal"	Dan Fausett	Michael Reaves	June 16, 1998
6	"Renewal"	"Home"	Dan Fausett	Ruel Fischmann	June 16, 1998
7	"Capture"	"Capture"	Dan Fausett	Wayne Lemon	June 23, 1998
8	"Capture"	"The Trip"	Dan Fausett	Wayne Lemon	June 23, 1998
9	"Friendly Fire"	"Allies"	Dan Fausett	Michael Reaves	June 30, 1998
10	"Friendly Fire"	"Charade"	Patrick Archibald	Ruel Fischmann	June 30, 1998
11	"Final Mission"	"Rendezvous"	Dan Fausett	Wayne Lemon	July 7, 1998
12	"Final Mission"	"Countdown"	Patrick Archibald	Ruel Fischmann	July 7, 1998
13	"Final Mission"	"Dark Side"	Dan Fausett	Michael Reaves	July 7, 1998

== Versions ==
DreamWorks released two versions, one being edited for younger audiences. The uncut version was aired in the prime time lineup on The WB from June to July 1998 while the edited version was aired on Kids' WB later in the fall In addition, the story of Invasion America was never completed, with the series ending with the words "End of Book One." Like Toonsylvania, the series is currently owned by Amblin Television, but not currently owned by DreamWorks Animation Television (or Paramount Skydance), with the series is currently presented in the uncut version.

== Reception ==
The show received a mixed reception from critics. Howard Rosenberg of The Los Angeles Times gave the show a largely negative review, criticizing the writing and "thin plot". Anita Gates of The New York Times noted that the animation was "impressive", but at the same time that "there's no heart in it". The Sun Sentinel wrote that the cartoon leaves viewers bored, while in a mostly positive review Entertainment Weekly stated "Invasion is at least as involving as any of the current variations on Star Trek, and handsomer to look at than all of them. B+".

== Tie-in novels ==
A prequel novel by Christie Golden was published four months before the first episode aired. A second novel, On the Run, was published later the same year which adapted portions of the planned first season. SF Site praised On the Run's character relationships and plot as "developed fully and realistically".

No.	Title	Date	ISBN
1	Invasion America	February 1998	0-451-45682-3
2	On the Run	November 1998	0-451-45693-9
