= Adulthood (2025 film) =

2025 American comedy drama film

- Theatrical release poster
- Directed by: Alex Winter
- Written by: Michael M.B. Galvin
- Produced by: Michael Cho; Tim Lee; Danny Roberts; Jackie Langelier; H.S. Naji; Scott Kroopf; Alex Winter; Russell Hollander; Lisa Wolofsky
- Starring: Josh Gad; Kaya Scodelario; Billie Lourd; Alex Winter; Anthony Carrigan
- Cinematography: Christopher Mably
- Edited by: Sandy Pereira
- Music by: Paul Leonard-Morgan
- Production company: El Jaibo LLC
- Distributed by: Republic Pictures
- Release dates: September 11, 2025 (TIFF); September 19, 2025 (United States)
- Running time: 97 minutes
- Country: United States
- Language: English

Adulthood is a 2025 American comedy drama film directed by Alex Winter and written by Michael M.B. Galvin. It stars Josh Gad, Kaya Scodelario, Billie Lourd, Winter, and Anthony Carrigan.

The film premiered at the 2025 Toronto International Film Festival on September 11, 2025, and was released in selected theaters on September 19, 2025.

== Premise ==
A brother and sister discover a dead body in their parents' basement.

== Cast ==
- Josh Gad as Noah Robles
- Kaya Scodelario as Megan Robles-Vargas
- Alex Winter as Doug Metzger
- Billie Lourd as Grace Briscoe
- Anthony Carrigan as Bodie Geller

== Production ==
The film is directed by Alex Winter who also stars and is a producer. The film was initially entitled The Adults. Michael Cho, Tim Lee, Danny Roberts, Jackie Langelier, H.S. Naji, Scott Kroopf, Lisa Wolofsky, and Russell Hollander are producers. Michael M.B. Galvin wrote the script. Olive Hill Media is the lead equity financier for the film.

In May 2024, Kaya Scodelario and Billie Lourd joined the cast which also contained Josh Gad, and Anthony Carrigan, and principal photography got underway in Ottawa.

Casting for this production was done by Ilona Smyth and her Smyth Casting team.

== Release ==
In October 2024, Republic Pictures acquired North American distribution rights to the film.

== Reception ==
The film holds a 77% approval rating on review aggregator Rotten Tomatoes, based on 22 critic reviews with an average rating of 5.8/10.

It was nominated for Best Independent Film at the 53rd Saturn Awards.
