= Absolute Dominion =

- Release poster
- Directed by: Lexi Alexander
- Written by: Lexi Alexander
- Produced by: Lexi Alexander; John McKeown; Scott Putman
- Starring: Désiré Mia; Fabiano Viett; Alex Winter; Patton Oswalt; Julie Ann Emery; Andy Allo; Alok Vaid-Menon
- Cinematography: Egor Povolotskiy
- Edited by: Freddy Noriega
- Music by: Kurt Farquhar
- Production companies: Ajnabi Productions; Trouper Productions
- Distributed by: Giant Pictures
- Release date: May 9, 2025
- Running time: 101 minutes
- Country: United States
- Language: English

Absolute Dominion is a 2025 American science fiction action film written, produced, and directed by Lexi Alexander. It stars Désiré Mia, Fabiano Viett, Alex Winter, Patton Oswalt, Julie Ann Emery, Andy Allo, and Alok Vaid-Menon.

== Plot ==
In 2085 A.D., the world is being destroyed by religious warfare. Desperate to save humanity, global governing forces host a gripping, no-holds-barred, martial arts tournament. Last fighter standing wins Absolute Dominion for one faith.

== Cast ==
- Désiré Mia as Sagan Bruno
- Reagan Gomez-Preston as Claudia
- Fabiano Viett as Mestre Gato Santo
- Alex Winter as Dr. Jehuda Bruno
- Patton Oswalt as Fix Huntley
- Julie Ann Emery as Diane Zimmer
- Andy Allo as Naya Olinga
- Alok Vaid-Menon as Ceylon
- Juliana Joel as Steph

== Production ==
In April 2022, Netflix and Blumhouse Television announced Absolute Dominion which was written and directed by Lexi Alexander, with Alex Winter, Andy Allo, Alok Vaid-Menon, Désiré Mia, Fabiano Viett, and Patton Oswalt starring.

=== Filming ===
Principal photography began in April 2022 in Nevada. Filming took place at the defunct Terrible's Hotel & Casino in Jean.

== Release ==
Absolute Dominion was set to be released by Blumhouse Productions and Netflix, before the film was dropped by both studios. It was released on video on demand by Giant Pictures on May 9, 2025.

== Reception ==
On the review aggregator website Rotten Tomatoes, 50% of 12 critics' reviews are positive.
