= Deep Web (film) =

2015 documentary film by Alex Winter

Deep Web: The Untold Story of Bitcoin and the Silk Road
- Theatrical release poster
- Directed by: Alex Winter
- Written by: Alex Winter
- Produced by: Marc Schiller, Alex Winter, Glen Zipper
- Narrated by: Keanu Reeves
- Cinematography: Anghel Decca; Joe DeSalvo
- Edited by: Dan Swietlik
- Music by: Pedro Bromfman
- Production companies: BOND360; Trouper Productions; Zipper Bros Films
- Distributed by: Kino Lorber
- Release date: March 15, 2015 (SXSW)
- Running time: 120 minutes
- Country: United States
- Language: English
- Budget: 1 million

Deep Web: The Untold Story of Bitcoin and the Silk Road is a 2015 documentary-film directed by Alex Winter, chronicling events surrounding Silk Road, bitcoin and the politics of the dark web.

== Overview ==
Covering the trial of Ross Ulbricht, the documentary features interviews with Wired writer Andy Greenberg and developer Amir Taaki. Deep Web features narration from actor Keanu Reeves. The film premiered at the 2015 South By Southwest film festival, and aired on the Epix network on May 31, 2015.
