= The Idiot Box (TV series) =

American sketch comedy television series

- The opening credits of The Idiot Box
- Created by: Alex Winter; Tom Stern; Tim Burns
- Starring: Alex Winter; Tom Stern
- Country of origin: United States
- Original language: English
- No. of seasons: 1
- No. of episodes: 6

Production
- Running time: 30 minutes

Original release
- Network: MTV
- Release: 1991

The Idiot Box is an American sketch comedy television series created by Alex Winter, Tom Stern and Tim Burns that ran on MTV in 1991.

After the success of Bill & Ted, MTV hired Winter, Stern, and Burns to develop a half-hour sketch comedy show for the network. As the channel was still strictly music-oriented at the time, The Idiot Box was mainly a showcase for popular music videos, but with a series of sketches, fake commercials, and parodies shown in between. Therefore, although an episode ran 30 minutes, there were only 7 to 11 minutes' worth of sketches.

Inspired heavily by the likes of Mad magazine and Monty Python's Flying Circus, the humor in The Idiot Box was rooted in absurdity and violent slapstick, often in the form of television and movie parodies and commercials for fake television shows (such as "Mumford the Yodeling Mutt" and "Who's A Total Idiot? with Tony Danza"). Each episode would end with a recap by the Max Headroom-esque VOTAR, "the future of television announcing", as he would criticize each of the sketches in the episode and occasionally quote lines from new wave songs.

Winter, Stern, and Burns chose to cease production after six episodes and instead accepted a high-paying deal with 20th Century Fox to write and direct their own feature film. The result was 1993's Freaked, which featured the same brand of humor as The Idiot Box.

== Recurring characters and sketches ==
Eddie the Flying Gimp from Outer Space
A parody of 1950s sitcoms, Eddie the Flying Gimp (Winter) is, as the name would imply, a flying gimp who came down from outer space to live with the relatively normal Knudsen family (whose patriarch was played by John Hawkes) and help solve their everyday problems, including murdering the school bully and unsuccessfully teaching the Knudsen boy to fly. Eddie is referenced in the opening line of Freaked, where a newscaster announces "the flying gimp has been destroyed" and that people can safely return to their homes.
Lockjaw
A parody of 1970s cop shows, Lockjaw (Stern) is a tough street cop who one day steps on a rusty nail. Failing to get a tetanus shot, he becomes stuck in a permanent state of lock jaw. Each episode deals with his increasing frustration over not being able to speak intelligibly. The "opening credits" for each sketch features musician Flea playing a criminal.
Willard Schreck's "If I Had My Way"
Willard Schreck (Winter) is a caffeine-addicted convenience store clerk who uses his store's security camera to broadcast his usually demented opinions, including making beef sticks out of k.d. lang and putting hippies to work in salt mines. Occasionally Willard is visited by a celebrity (impersonator), such as Carol Channing and Sinéad O'Connor, the latter of whom Willard catches trying to steal beef jerky. His sign-off catchphrase is "don't make a jerk out of yourself!"
The Burrowing Bishop
"Sir" Albert Woodneck (Winter) stars as the title character, a mumbling bishop who, along with his sidekick Falco the Sarcastic Clown (Lee Arenberg), uses his conical hat to burrow underground to perform good deeds, such as saving children trapped in wells and capturing escaped prisoners.
The Huggins Family
A parody of cheesy 1980s family sitcoms, The Huggins are a family who always use love, understanding, and hugs to work out their many problems, ranging from Dad's alcoholism to son Jared's affinity for siphoning the blood out of small animals. The Huggins children were played by Ricki Lake and Danny Cooksey.
Battle of the bands
A parody of which famous rock bands would face off in a football field, mostly the boo ya tribe would face off against famous musicians and bands like Wilson Phillips and Jerry Garcia and would be victorious with Alex serving as referee.
The very finest of tonight's idiot box
Voltar, a computer generated figure, who claimed to be the future of television, would do a recap of whole episode before it ended

== Home media ==
Winter and Stern both expressed a desire to release The Idiot Box on DVD, but reportedly ran into troubles with MTV. According to an interview with Winter:

"I'm petitioning for it right now. I've been trying to get MTV to do it for years and it's just impossible. It's such a bureaucracy over there. I don't think there's anyone opposed to it but I just can't get anyone off their ass and actually deal with it. But I'm hoping sometime soon. There was a moment where Anchor Bay was actually going to get all of it on the Freaked DVD and then at the last minute MTV changed their mind."

At a 2009 Los Angeles screening of Freaked, Winter elaborated that a big part of MTV's hesitancy to release the show is the short length of the episodes, which, when combined, clock in at just under 60 minutes' worth of material.

An internet petition was created to get The Idiot Box on DVD and has since accumulated over 1,000 signatures. All six episodes are currently available for viewing on YouTube, along with a rare commercial and 'Best of' video, uploaded by Winter and Stern's official website. In the 20th-anniversary interview for their album Nevermind on Sirius XM, remaining Nirvana band members recalled that Kurt Cobain was a fan of the show.

In August 2025, Severin Films announced that they would be releasing a Blu-ray box set of The Idiot Box. The box set was released on November 28, 2025.

== See also ==
- Freaked
