= Human Radio =

American Rock Band

- Origin: Memphis, Tennessee
- Genres: New wave, alternative rock
- Labels: Columbia
- Past members: Ross Rice; Kye Kennedy; Steve Ebe; Steve Arnold; Peter Hyrka

Human Radio is an American rock band originally from Memphis, Tennessee. The group was formed in late 1988 by lead singer Ross Rice, and in 1990 they released a self-titled LP on Columbia Records. Their single "Me and Elvis" was a hit in the US, reaching #32 on the Billboard Mainstream Rock Tracks chart. The band did a club tour of the US, plus a residency in New England, before closing with a SRO show at The Lone Star Roadhouse in New York City. When the subsequent release of the second single was cancelled, the departure of the band from Columbia was inevitable.

After moving to Nashville, the group broke with Columbia and recorded demos while searching for a new label. After two more years of touring, mostly in the Southeast US, with an unreleased second record, the band called it quits in 1992. To honor their Memphis roots and fans, Human Radio played a farewell show at The South End in Memphis, the bar where they got their start. Rice went on to record a solo album called Umpteen in 1997. Steve Arnold later went on to tour as bass guitarist with Marty Stuart and Travis Tritt on their "Double Trouble" tour.

More recently, the group's Facebook page indicated that they had been "in a room trying to find brand new music together." An October 4, 2013 entry read, in part:

"Good week in Nashville with Human Radio, getting solid with what we have already, finding some new things in combustion mode. Moving slowly towards an inevitable future."

On May 9, 2015, the band played a well-received reunion gig at The Basement in Nashville. A successful Indiegogo campaign later in 2015 resulted in the independent production of an album, Samsara (Human Radio Records, 2016), with all new material written and performed by the original members of the band.
