= Human Radio (album) =

Studio album by Human Radio
- Released: May 2, 1990
- Recorded: Skip Saylor Recording, Ocean Way Recording (both in Hollywood), Memphis Sound Productions (Memphis)
- Genre: Rock
- Length: 39:15
- Label: Columbia
- Producer: David Kahne, Patrick Leonard

Professional ratings
Review scores
Source	Rating
Allmusic	4.5/5 stars

Human Radio is the debut album of Memphis band Human Radio, released in 1990 on Columbia Records. It contained the hit single, "Me and Elvis", which reached No. 32 on the Billboard Mainstream Rock Tracks chart. My First Million was released as the second single from the album, but did not chart.

== Track listing ==
All tracks written by Ross Rice except as indicated.

1. Me & Elvis - 3:26
2. I Don't Wanna Know - 5:08
3. Hole in My Head - 2:39
4. These Are the Days - 3:38
5. Monkey Suit (Richard Young) - 3:54
6. My First Million - 3:47
7. Electromagnetism (Rice, Kye Kennedy) - 3:43
8. N.Y.C. - 4:20
9. Another Planet - 3:42
10. Harsh Light of Reality (Rice, Peter Hyrka) - 4:58

== Personnel ==
- Ross Rice: Vocals, Acoustic Guitars, Keyboards
- Peter Hyrka: Electric Guitars, Electric Mandolin and Violin, Triangle, Vocal Backing
- Kye Kennedy: Electric Guitars, Vocal Backing
- Steve Arnold: Bass, Vocal Backing
- Steve Ebe: Drums, Percussion, Vocal Backing

== Production ==
- Produced and Recorded by David Kahne and Patrick Leonard
- Additional Recording by Joe Shay, Ross Donaldson (Skip Saylor Recording), Jim Godsey, John Fleskes (Memphis Sound Productions), Clark Germain, Eric Rudd and Stacey Baird (Ocean Way Recording)
- Mixed by David Leonard, with mixing assistance by Neal Pogue (at Larrabee Sound) and Chris Puram (at Skip Saylor Recording)
- Mastered by Wally Traugott
- All songs published by CBS Music Inc./Hook n'B Music/House Projects Music (ASCAP) except "Electromagnetism" published by CBS Music Inc./Hook n'B Music/House Projects Music (ASCAP)/CRGI Music/VBF Music/Haylin House Music (BMI).
