= Grand Piano (film) =

- Theatrical release poster
- Directed by: Eugenio Mira
- Written by: Damien Chazelle
- Produced by: Rodrigo Cortés; Adrian Guerra
- Starring: Elijah Wood; John Cusack; Tamsin Egerton; Kerry Bishé; Alex Winter
- Cinematography: Unax Mendía
- Edited by: Jose Luis Romeu
- Music by: Victor Reyes
- Production company: Nostromo Pictures
- Distributed by: Paramount Pictures
- Release dates: 20 September 2013 (Fantastic Fest); 25 October 2013 (Spain)
- Running time: 90 minutes
- Country: Spain
- Language: English
- Box office: $1.6 million

Grand Piano is a 2013 Spanish English-language thriller film directed by Eugenio Mira, written by Damien Chazelle, and starring Elijah Wood and John Cusack. The film is about a once-promising pianist returning for a comeback performance, only to be the target of a sniper who will kill him if he plays one wrong note. The film premiered at Fantastic Fest on 20 September 2013 and was given a VOD release on 30 January 2014. It was given a limited release in American theatres on 7 March. Grand Piano was Alex Winter's first non-cameo film role since 1993's Freaked.

== Plot ==
Tom Selznick was an up-and-coming concert pianist until he developed stage fright while attempting to play a complex piece, "La Cinquette". Five years later, he is slated to appear in Chicago for a comeback performance, dedicated to the memory of his late mentor, pianist and composer Patrick Godureaux (who composed "La Cinquette"). Godureaux posthumously acquired massive media coverage due to the mysterious disappearance of his vast fortune. Tom's return to the stage is prompted by the encouragement of his actress-singer wife, Emma.

As Tom arrives at the theater, his friend Norman (conductor for the evening) reassures him that he will perform well. Shortly thereafter, a house usher hands Tom a folder of sheet music. Within, he finds the manuscript to "La Cinquette" and discards it. During the concert, Tom finds a note written on his sheet music that reads "Play one wrong note and you DIE". Believing it to be a prank, he ignores it, only to find further notes that threaten Emma, as well as a laser dot that tracks his movement.

Disturbed, Tom leaves the stage, shocking the audience. He returns to his dressing room, where he receives a text that instructs him to locate and wear an earpiece, allowing communication with the would-be assassin, Clem. When Tom returns to the stage, Clem demonstrates the stealth and range of his silenced rifle by firing a shot into the floor to Tom's left; no one else notices.

Desperate, Tom surreptitiously uses his cell phone to contact his friend Wayne, who is in the audience. When Wayne's phone rings, it momentarily disrupts the performance; Wayne leaves the concert hall in embarrassment. As he plays, Tom texts Wayne, but the usher (Clem's assistant) kills Wayne. Shortly thereafter, Clem tells Tom to look up; Wayne's body is sprawled across the rafters. Wayne's girlfriend Ashley leaves the hall in search of him, but she is also killed by the usher. Clem then tells Tom that instead of performing Beethoven's "Tempest Sonata", as Norman originally announced, he must perform "La Cinquette" flawlessly, as an embedded lock in the piano depends on a flawless performance. Clem further reveals that the release of said lock would yield a key to a safe deposit box containing Patrick Godureaux's disappeared fortune; Clem himself is the locksmith who worked with Godureaux to construct the mechanism. Tom insists that he can only perform "La Cinquette" with sheet music.

During intermission, Tom runs backstage in search of the crumpled manuscript, only to find that the janitor has destroyed it. Tom returns to his dressing room and listens to the piece on a tablet that Emma gave him earlier that evening, feverishly taking notes to help himself remember before returning to the stage. Norman announces Tom's solo performance of the Tempest Sonata, but Tom interrupts and trepidatiously announces that he will instead perform "La Cinquette", to the audience's delight. Clem warns Tom to pace himself, so as not to wear himself out.

Tom plays the piece completely free of error, until he reaches the very last note, which he deliberately misplays, infuriating Clem. Tom retorts that the audience does not know the difference - he receives a standing ovation, during which Tom realizes that he has finally conquered both "La Cinquette" and his own stage fright. Tom ignores Clem's shouted threats and introduces Emma. Much to her and the audience's surprise, Tom suggests that she sing an encore. Emma reluctantly obliges and Norman accompanies her on a rendition of "Sometimes I Feel Like a Motherless Child". The usher, realizing that everything he and Clem worked for is over, attempts to flee the building, but is shot by Clem. Tom overhears this and runs offstage.

Racing upstairs, Tom finds the usher's corpse. Clem comes out of the shadows and chases Tom to the light fixture catwalk, directly above the stage. In the ensuing struggle, Clem threateningly dangles Tom over the catwalk edge, but Tom braces himself and yanks Clem over the railing. To the entire hall's horror, Tom and Clem fall to the stage. Clem crashes into the piano but Tom lands to the side and survives. Emma rushes over to him, they embrace, and he tells her "I think I broke my leg".

Later, while waiting with Emma for his ambulance to leave, Tom notices the obliterated piano being loaded into a shipping truck. Climbing into the truck, he plays the last four bars of "La Cinquette" correctly, but nothing happens. Disappointed, Tom turns away until he hears the gears of the internal lock system turn and the sound of a metal key hitting the floor. He bends down to pick it up as the camera cuts to black.

== Cast ==
- Elijah Wood as Tom Selznick
- John Cusack as Clem
- Kerry Bishé as Emma Selznick
- Tamsin Egerton as Ashley
- Allen Leech as Wayne
- Jack Taylor as Patrick Godureaux
- Don McManus as Norman
- Alex Winter as the Usher

== Production ==
Elijah Wood had worked with a teacher three weeks prior to going to Barcelona and found it stressful having to play the piano and speak at the same time saying, "It was incredibly technical [...] lots of moments where it was jumping from where I'd play, listen to a click, listen to music, have to be in the right place and the right time and hear dialogue and repeat dialogue".

== Reception ==
On the review aggregator website Rotten Tomatoes, 80% of 74 critics' reviews are positive, with an average rating of 6.5/10. The website's consensus reads: "Grand Piano is so tense in its best moments — and appealingly strange overall — that it remains rewarding in spite of its flaws." Metacritic, which uses a weighted average, assigned the film a score of 61 out of 100, based on 20 critics, indicating "generally favorable" reviews.

Todd Gilchrist of Indiewire said, "Grand Piano succeeds as a whole for the same reasons that Selznick does—namely, because Mira brings all of its elements to work together in concert, and then executes them like a virtuoso". Guy Lodge, writing for Variety, commented on the film, saying "this not-quite horror film is refreshingly blood-shy even in bloodshed, preferring to let the scarlet soft furnishings of a plush Chicago concert hall provide the red menace".

Stephen Dalton, writing for The Hollywood Reporter, found the film lacking but said "it has just enough stylistic swagger to excuse its utterly preposterous plot". He also found praise in the performances of Elijah Wood, John Cusack and Alex Winter, saying, "Together they elevate a visibly ridiculous plot into something akin to a pulp symphony".

== Awards and nominations ==
Awards	Category	Nominated work	Result
Premios Feroz	Best Drama		Nominated
Premios Feroz	Best Original Soundtrack	Víctor Reyes	Won
Neox Fan Awards	Best Spanish film		9th
Saturn Awards	Best Independent Film		Nominated
