= Whisper network =

Informal network of women sharing warnings about abusive men

A whisper network is an informal chain of information passed privately between people, typically women. It consists of gossip about people in a community (frequently a professional community) alleged to be sexual harassers or abusers. The information is often shared between women by word of mouth or online in private communities, forums, spreadsheets, and crowd-sourced documents. The stated purpose of maintaining these lists is to warn potential victims of "people to avoid" in their industry. Whisper networks also purportedly help victims identify a common abuser and come forward together about a serial abuser.

The term "whisper network" was newly popularized during the #MeToo movement after several private lists were published outside of private networks. Among the published lists were the Shitty Media Men list, the California State Capitol list, and the Harvey Weinstein Google doc. Karen Kelsky created a less controversial list about men in academia called "Sexual Harassment In the Academy: A Crowdsourced Survey" which had grown to over 2000 entries by the end of 2017. It includes stories without actually naming the accusing and accused parties. Kelsky said she hoped the list would help demonstrate the scope of sexual misconduct in the academic field, and it has resulted in the investigation of twelve men at the University of Michigan.

== Alternatives ==
Publishing whisper networks to the public has been widely criticized for spreading unsubstantiated rumors that can damage reputations. However, there continues to be debate on the best alternatives for women who have been punished or ignored by official channels to warn other women. It has been noted that certain vulnerable groups, such as young women and women of color, rarely get access to these private lists. As a result, these groups rarely receive any protection from whisper networks unless they are published.

The main problem with trying to protect more potential victims by publishing whisper networks is determining the best mechanism to verify allegations. Some suggestions have included strengthening unions in vulnerable industries so workers can report directly to the union, maintaining industry hotlines which have the power to trigger third-party investigations, and creating public systems that allow anonymous reporting with the ability to connect victims who report the same perpetrator.

Several apps have been developed which offer various ways for women to report alleged sexual misconduct, and some of these apps have the ability to connect victims with each other. This includes the app Lulu.

Are We Dating The Same Guy?, a set of Facebook groups for commenting on men, and DontDateHimGirl.com are other examples of online whisper networks.

Sex workers regularly share “bad date lists” and St. James Infirmary Clinic (which offers health and safety services for sex workers) created a “Bad Date” app that allows sex workers to anonymously log incidents and warn other sex workers about clients who have threatened, extorted, robbed, or been violent.

== See also ==
- Character assassination
- Mobbing
- Smear campaign
- Whispering campaign
