= Tea (app) =

Women-only mobile phone app

Tea Dating Advice
- Developers: Tea Dating Advice, Inc.
- Release: 2023
- Operating system: iOS; Android
- Type: Social networking
- Website: www.teaforwomen.com

Tea, officially Tea Dating Advice, is a mobile phone application that allows women to post personal data about men they are interested in or are currently dating. Founded by Sean Cook, the app rose to prominence in July 2025 after it was the subject of two major data leaks in July and August 2025. It was removed from Apple's App Store in October 2025, but remains available on the Google Play Store.

== History ==
The app enables its users to upload, view, and comment on photos of men, check men's public records, and perform image searches. The app uses artificial intelligence to verify that the user is a woman through facial analysis and other personal information to preserve the app as a women-only space.

The company that created the app was founded by businessman and tech capitalist Sean Cook, who stated in July 2025 that he was inspired to create the app because of his mother's experiences from online dating. According to the company, users remain anonymous, and the requirement to upload an ID was removed in 2023. An August 2025 investigation by 404 Media suggested that much of the information given by Cook on the historical background of the company was inaccurate.

In July 2025, private messages, other personally identifying information, and approximately 72,000 images were leaked via 4chan. A further 1.1 million private messages were subsequently leaked using a separate security vulnerability; these included intimate conversations about controversial topics such as adultery and other forms of infidelity to their partners, discussions of abortion, phone numbers, meeting locations, and other confidential communications. The app's publishers subsequently revoked the ability to private message users in the app. Shortly after, the app was hidden from search on Android and an interactive, unverified map was also created of those in the files. By 7 August 2025, ten class action lawsuits had been filed. A further leak was reported later that month.

Proponents have praised the app as an aid for women's safety by helping them check men for adultery, catfishing, criminal convictions and other "red flag" behaviors. Critics have described the app as a doxing tool and a violation of privacy, an opportunity for defamation against innocent individuals, and a witch hunt. Cook has stated that the company's legal team receives about three legal threats per day. Another mobile app, called TeaOnHer, was created in response of the app’s popularity. It was described as the male version of the Tea app, which was subsequently shut down due to a significant amount of non-consensual imagery posted to its app. The app also reported a data breach in August 2025.

In October 2025, Apple removed the app from their app store, telling journalists that the removal was due to a failure to meet company terms regarding content moderation and user privacy. Apple also mentioned an excessive number of complaints, including allegations that the personal information of minors was being shared. The app remains on the Google Play Store.

== See also ==
- Are We Dating The Same Guy? – a set of Facebook groups for commenting on men
- DontDateHimGirl.com – a website with a similar rating system
- Lulu – a website and mobile app with a similar rating system in place for men
- Peeple (app) – mobile application intended to allow people to leave recommendations for other people
- JuicyCampus – website focusing on gossip, rumors, and rants related to colleges and universities in the United States
