= Bad Dates =

Bad Dates may refer to:

- Bad Dates (podcast)
- "Bad Dates" (Slow Horses)

== See also ==
- Bad date list
