= Jackie Goldberg =

American politician and teacher (born 1944)

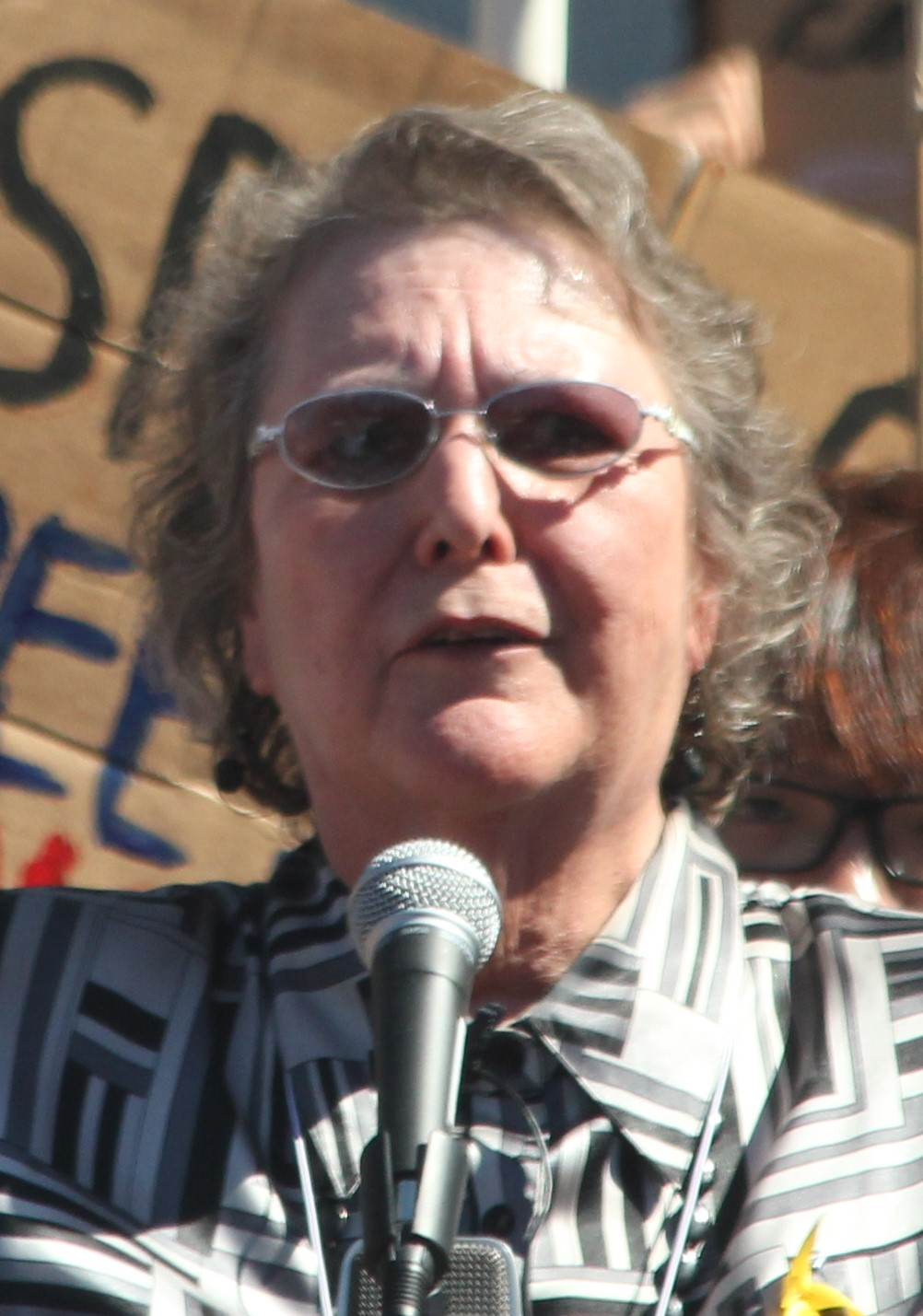
- Goldberg in 2014

Member of the Los Angeles Unified School District Board of Education
- In office May 21, 2019 – December 9, 2024
- Preceded by: Ref Rodriguez
- Succeeded by: Karla Griego
- Constituency: 5th district
- In office July 5, 1983 – July 4, 1991
- Preceded by: Tony Trias
- Succeeded by: Jeff Horton
- Constituency: 3rd district

President of the Los Angeles Unified School District Board of Education
- In office January 17, 2023 – December 9, 2024
- Preceded by: Kelly Gonez
- Succeeded by: Scott Schmerelson
- In office July 10, 1989 – July 4, 1991
- Preceded by: Roberta L. Weintraub
- Succeeded by: Warren Furutani

Member of the California State Assembly from the 45th district
- In office December 4, 2000 – November 30, 2006
- Preceded by: Antonio Villaraigosa
- Succeeded by: Kevin de León

Member of the Los Angeles City Council from the 13th district
- In office July 1, 1993 – December 2, 2000
- Preceded by: Mike Woo
- Succeeded by: Eric Garcetti

Personal details
- Born: Jacqueline Barbara Goldberg; November 18, 1944 (age 81) Los Angeles, California, US
- Party: Democratic
- Spouse: Sharon Stricker (m. 2008)
- Education: University of California, Berkeley (BA); University of Chicago (MEd)

Jacqueline Barbara Goldberg (born November 18, 1944) is an American former politician, activist and educator who served as a member of the Los Angeles Unified School District Board of Education for District 5 from 2019 until 2024. Previously serving as a board member from 1983 until 1991, Goldberg has also served as a member of the Los Angeles City Council and the California State Assembly.

Participating in the Free Speech Movement while a student at the University of California, Berkeley, Goldberg was first elected to the Los Angeles Unified School District Board of Education in 1983. In 1993, she was elected to the Los Angeles City Council for the 13th district, becoming the first openly lesbian candidate elected to the city council. Goldberg was later elected to the California State Assembly for the 45th district. After a period away from electoral politics, she was re-elected to the Board of Education in 2019.

While serving on the City Council, Goldberg spearheaded efforts to extend benefits to unmarried domestic partners and authored a significant ordinance that ensured a living wage and benefits for all City of Los Angeles employees. She was also credited by the business community with being instrumental in revitalizing Hollywood. In the State Assembly, she authored several education-related bills and passed legislation that granted LGBT couples rights similar to those of married spouses.

== Early life and education ==
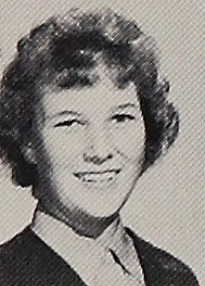
Goldberg in the Morningside High School yearbook, 1960

Goldberg was born on November 18, 1944 in Los Angeles, California, to Ed Goldberg, a housewares salesman, and Ruth Goldberg, a teacher. She has a brother, Arthur, who is an activist and attorney. The family lived in Inglewood, California, where she attended Morningside High School. She graduated early and attended University of California, Berkeley, where she graduated with a bachelor's degree and was inducted into Phi Beta Kappa. She later went to the University of Chicago, where she graduated with a master's degree.

While in high school, she became involved in activism. In 1964, she and Arthur participated in the Free Speech Movement at Berkeley. Goldberg took a leading role and led the initial talks with the University of California administration to peacefully resolve the police car blockade before being replaced as the spokesperson by Mario Savio. She was arrested during a nonviolent demonstration, which subsequently prevented her from securing a job within the Los Angeles Unified School District. After graduating from the University of Chicago, she became a teacher in the Compton Unified School District.

== LAUSD Board of Education ==
In 1983, Goldberg ran for the Los Angeles Unified School District Board of Education against 3rd district incumbent Tony Trias, who had been appointed three years earlier. Goldberg placed ahead of Trias in the primary election. In the general election, Goldberg defeated Trias, with her victory contributing to a four-person liberal majority on the board, alongside the simultaneous election of Larry Gonzalez. In the 1987 election, Trias again challenged Goldberg, but she defeated him again in the primary.

During her first tenure as school president, the board implemented a year-round schedule to alleviate overcrowding in schools and established a program to give greater authority to the community, including teachers and parents. However, Goldberg expressed disappointment that many low income, immigrant, and minority students continued to struggle academically. She faced criticism for her straightforwardness and was viewed as untrustworthy by some, particularly conservative board members. Her supporters argued that the criticism stemmed from her initiatives to reform the system and empower parents and teachers. During the 1989 teachers' strike, Goldberg was one of three board members inclined to compromise with the teachers' union, and she attempted to reach an agreement before the strike occurred. Two months later, Goldberg was elected as board president. However, board member Rita Walters cast the lone vote against Goldberg's election, expressing concern that Goldberg's election was from the board's preference for teachers over administrators. She was later re-elected to the position on July 9, 1990. In November 1990, Goldberg announced her retirement from the board and her intention to return to her career as a high school teacher. She was succeeded by teacher Jeff Horton.

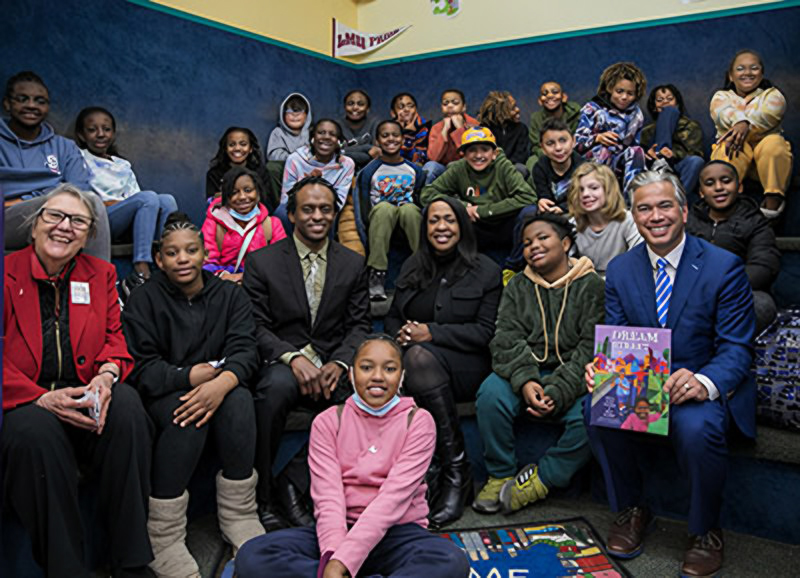
Goldberg (far left) with Attorney General Rob Bonta during Read Across America Day.

On July 23, 2018, following the resignation of incumbent District 5 board member Ref Rodriguez due to perjury and other felony charges, Goldberg expressed interest in filling his seat. She clarified that she intended to serve only the remainder of his term if appointed but expressed the possibility of running in a special election if she were not appointed. Some parents wanted a Latino representative since the majority of the students were Latino, but Goldberg highlighted her endorsements from Latino leaders such as Dolores Huerta. The board opted to schedule an election on March 5, 2019, followed by a runoff on May 14, 2019, while also deciding against pursuing an appointment process. Goldberg announced her candidacy to complete the term as a candidate backed by the teachers' union. Among ten candidates, she secured the top position and proceeded to a runoff against Heather Repenning. In the runoff, Goldberg achieved a landslide victory over Repenning, signaling a significant shift in the board's power dynamic toward union-backed members, as the board had previously been majority pro-charter. In the 2020 election, she was challenged by teacher Christina Martinez Duran. Goldberg faced opposition from Manhattan Beach businessman Bill Bloomfield, who ran attack ads against her. The advertisements accused Goldberg of putting children at risk of gun violence and linked her to a sexual misconduct scandal at Miramonte Elementary, which Goldberg denounced as "vicious lies." Despite Bloomfield's efforts, Goldberg defeated Martinez Duran and was re-elected to a second term.

In her first days back on the board, Goldberg challenged the aid provided to charter schools and pushed for the passing of Measure EE, a school funding measure. In July 2020, following the George Floyd protests, Goldberg co-wrote a resolution with board member Mónica García to reduce the school police budget by $25 million. In January 2023, Goldberg was elected as the president of the Board of Education, replacing Kelly Gonez. In her second tenure as president, she focused on making meetings understandable and accessible to the public, explaining how the board conducted its business, and ensuring that meetings and public comments started on time. She also led the board in providing LGBTQ+ support following anti-LGBTQ+ protests at Saticoy Elementary School. Prior to the three-day teachers' strike in 2023, Goldberg led talks between the teachers' union and the district. These negotiations broke down after union organizers accused the district of breaking confidentiality. Goldberg admitted to this, explaining that she wanted to congratulate the organizers and was unaware it was supposed to be a secret. She was re-elected as board president on December 12, 2023. In August 2023, Goldberg announced that she would be retiring from the board in 2024 and stepping away from electoral politics. She was succeeded by Karla Griego in the 2024 election.

== Los Angeles City Council ==
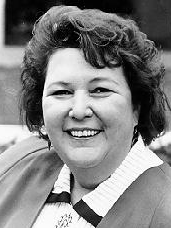
Goldberg as part of the Los Angeles City Council.

In 1993, Goldberg entered the race for the Los Angeles City Council's 13th district seat after incumbent Michael Woo opted not to seek re-election, instead making an unsuccessful mayoral bid. Joining Goldberg in the election were notable figures from the gay community, including AIDS health care executive Michael Weinstein and television executive Conrado Terrazas. Future councilmember Tom LaBonge, who was serving as an aide to council president John Ferraro at the time, also ran in the election. She and LaBonge advanced to a runoff, with Goldberg receiving endorsements from high-profile Democrats like Gloria Molina and aiming to perform well in ethnically diverse urban areas. LaBonge concentrated his campaign efforts on districts outside Hollywood, targeting conservative, Anglo-American homeowners. Both traded accusations of holding to special interests, with LaBonge accusing Goldberg of taking special-interest money, and Goldberg claiming LaBonge accepted campaign funds from real estate developers. In the subsequent runoff election, Goldberg defeated LaBonge, becoming the first openly lesbian candidate to win a seat on the City Council.

While in the City Council, Goldberg introduced a motion to extend health insurance coverage to unmarried domestic partners of city employees. The decision drew criticism for its timing, given the city's ongoing budget deficit. However, it was also praised for enabling more people to get coverage, with proponents arguing that the costs would be minimal. Goldberg led the revitalization of the Hollywood area after the 1994 Northridge earthquake, in which she and her staff helped the Federal Disaster Assistance with giving supplies. She also assisted in forming the Yucca Corridor Coalition, which helped renovate the crime-ridden area, and developed a successful slum abatement program that held landlords accountable. In 1995, she and her wife, Sharon Stricker, co-founded an after-school enrichment initiative for students.

After her 2000 election to the State Assembly, Goldberg resigned from her seat on the City Council. She advocated for the appointment of her chief of staff, Sharon Delugach, to fill the vacancy, but the council ultimately decided against an appointment. The election to succeed her saw a variety of candidates, including her brother, Arthur, former councilmember Woo, former candidate and Goldberg's staffer Terrazas, activist Bennett Kayser, assemblyman Scott Wildman, and Eric Garcetti, the son of Los Angeles County District Attorney Gil Garcetti. Garcetti and Woo advanced to a runoff, where Garcetti ultimately won the election.

== California State Assembly ==
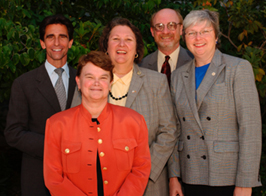
Goldberg (center) with the California Legislative LGBT Caucus

In 1999, Goldberg entered the 2000 election for the California State Assembly to succeed Antonio Villaraigosa, who was termed out and running for Mayor of Los Angeles in 2001. Initially facing competition from AIDS activist Cesar Portillo and legal services director Antonio de la Rosa, the latter withdrew from the race, leaving Goldberg and Portillo as the remaining candidates. During the campaign, Portillo accused Goldberg's campaign of spreading rumors about his arrest nine years earlier by an undercover policeman in a whispering campaign, and publicly disclosed this information to address the allegations. However, Goldberg's campaign denied these claims. In the primary, Goldberg secured a landslide victory over Portillo, and subsequently proceeded to win the general election unopposed. She was re-elected in 2002 and 2004 before being termed out. She was a founding member of the California Legislative LGBTQ Caucus in June 2002 alongside Mark Leno, Sheila Kuehl, John Laird, and Christine Kehoe.

While in the Assembly, Goldberg served as the chair of the Committee on Education and authored several education-related bills. These efforts included legislation to expedite school construction, a bill that gave teachers more say in textbook selection and curriculum development, and an attempt to ban Native American mascots in schools, which was ultimately blocked. She also wrote a bill that eliminated some of the differences between domestic partnerships and traditional marriages. The bill gave same-sex couples financial obligations to each other and to any children, responsibility for each others' debts, and the ability to own property and file taxes jointly. After she termed out, she was succeeded by labor organizer Kevin de León, who defeated Christine Chavez, the granddaughter of Cesar Chavez, and Elena Popp, the candidate endorsed by Goldberg.

== Personal life ==
Goldberg is lesbian and Jewish, and is married to Sharon Stricker, a poet and activist. The couple met in 1976 and moved to Echo Park three years later. They were married on March 8, 2004, in San Francisco during the city's same-sex weddings. Goldberg and Stricker have an adopted son named Brian Stricker Goldberg, whom they raised together.

After first retiring from politics in 2006, Goldberg taught for several years as part of the UCLA Teacher Education Program and joined UCLA's Center X. When Roy Romer was nearing retirement as Superintendent of the Los Angeles Unified School District, Goldberg was rumored to be campaigning for an appointment to the office, although she denied having any interest in the position.

== Electoral history ==
Electoral history of Jackie Goldberg
Year	Office		Party	Primary			General			Result	Swing	Ref.
Year	Office		Party	Total	%	P.	Total	%	P.	Result	Swing	Ref.
1983	LAUSD Board of Education	3rd	Nonpartisan	10,954	39.27%	1st	14,073	65.45%	1st	Won	N/A	
1987	LAUSD Board of Education	3rd	Nonpartisan	12,788	63.98%	1st	Runoff cancelled			Won	N/A	
1993	Los Angeles City Council	13th	Nonpartisan	7,218	34.14%	1st	11,753	51.43%	1st	Won	N/A	
1997	Los Angeles City Council	13th	Nonpartisan	13,823	100.00%	1st	Runoff cancelled			Won	N/A	
2000	California State Assembly	45th	Democratic	26,098	60.16%	1st	57,092	100.00%	1st	Won	Hold	
2002	California State Assembly	45th	Democratic	14,372	100.00%	1st	39,952	85.58%	1st	Won	Hold	
2004	California State Assembly	45th	Democratic	16,524	100.00%	1st	62,091	75.95%	1st	Won	Hold	
2019	LAUSD Board of Education	5th	Nonpartisan	15,935	48.18%	1st	20,552	71.62%	1st	Won	N/A	
2020	LAUSD Board of Education	5th	Nonpartisan	65,081	58.40%	1st	Runoff cancelled			Won	N/A	
