= David Haskell (disambiguation) =

David Haskell may be:

- David Haskell, (1948-2000), American actor
- David G. Haskell, British-American biologist
- David Haskell (editor), American editor
