= Julie Houts =

Julie Houts is a satirical illustrator.

She was a women's wear designer at J. Crew. During her free time, she created an Instagram account of her drawings which grew to have a following of 230,000 people.

She left J. Crew to become a full-time freelancer and published her first book of essays and illustrations in October 2017 called Literally Me. She has been featured in The Cut, Bustle, Vogue, Refinery29 and Forbes, among other publications for her self-deprecating humor and her approach to the fashion industry. In 2019 she was selected by Create & Cultivate as part of their 100 women to watch.

She grew up in Indiana and now lives in Brooklyn.
