= Ami Colé =

American cosmetics brand

- Founded: 2021 in Harlem, U.S.
- Founder: Diarrha N'Diaye-Mbaye
- Products: Cosmetics
- Website: amicole.com

Ami Colé is a cosmetics brand created by American businesswoman Diarrha N'Diaye-Mbaye. The product line was developed for dark and deep skin tones and has been recommended by Vogue, Allure, Marie Claire, and others.

== History ==
The company's founder and chief executive Diarrha N'Diaye-Mbaye secured one million dollars in pre-seed funding from investors including Imaginary Ventures, Lindsay Peoples Wagner, and Hannah Bronfman. She spent three years developing the products, which included collecting survey responses from 400 people to develop the tinted moisturizer. Some products include baobab seed extract as an homage to her Senegalese heritage.

The line launched in June 2021 with a tinted moisturizer, a lip oil, and a highlighter. N'Diaye-Mbaye stated that the company uses "clean" ingredients to provide alternatives to mainstream beauty products developed for people of color, which have disproportionate levels of toxic chemicals. The founder also focuses on enhancing skin luminosity to complement brown skin tones. Ami Colé products are marketed as easy to use and providing high quality within a simple makeup routine. Marketing materials typically include Black women with dark skin, as well as hijabis.

Ami Colé began to retail at Sephora in December 2022. In September 2024, L'Oréal invested an undisclosed amount into the brand through its venture capital arm. Ami Colé also became available at Sephora locations in Canada. At that time, the founder reported the brand had made approximately $3.5 million in sales.

== Founder ==
CEO Diarrha N'Diaye-Mbaye was born and raised in Harlem. She named the line after her mother, who immigrated to the U.S. from Dakar, Senegal. Her mother founded the Harlem-based salon Aminata African Hair Braiding in 1988. One reason N'Diaye-Mbaye chose to create a cosmetics brand was because she struggled to find foundation in her skin tone when she began to experiment with makeup as a teenager. The founder has worked in the cosmetics industry since 2013. She worked in social media strategy for L'Oréal and as a product developer at Glossier. N'Diaye-Mbaye resides in Harlem.

== Accolades ==
- 2023 – Allure Best of Beauty Awards, Eye Makeup
