= David Haskell (editor) =

American magazine editor

- Education: Yale University (BA); Queens' College, Cambridge (MLitt)
- Occupation: Magazine editor/co-founder of Kings County Distillery
- Title: Editor-in-chief of New York

David Haskell is an American magazine editor, ceramicist, and distiller. He was named editor-in-chief of New York in 2019, replacing longtime editor Adam Moss. At the time of Haskell's appointment, The New York Times noted that he was “the sort of professionally omnivorous, type-A New Yorker who might merit a feature in his magazine’s pages.” In 2021, he was named Adweek’s Publishing Editor of the Year.

Haskell is a co-founder of Kings County Distillery and a gallery-represented ceramicist.

== Education ==
Haskell graduated from Yale University in 2001 and was a member of the Truman Scholar class of 2000. After Yale he studied at Queens' College, Cambridge in the inaugural class of the Gates Cambridge Scholarship, receiving a Master of Letters in architecture.

== Career ==
While at Cambridge, Haskell founded the quarterly magazine Topic, later recalling that “when I found myself with time on my hands in Cambridge, I concentrated on starting something new that had to do with writing, and over the course of a few months it became clear that what we were working on was a magazine.” He moved Topic to New York City in 2004 while waiting tables as his day job. Victor Navasky, then publisher of The Nation and a professor at Columbia Journalism School, told The New York Times: “I see hundreds of little magazines, and Topic struck me as one of the smartest and most interesting combinations of literary aspiration and accessibility, with a very striking design.” Haskell edited Topic from 2002 to 2007, when he joined New York, initially to edit a special London issue.

In his early years at New York, Haskell edited the magazine's “My First New York” issue, which was published as a book from Ecco in 2010. He also edited special features for the magazine, including a package on Barack Obama’s legacy, speaking with 50 historians on how Obama's record would look years from now.

He served as deputy editor from 2012 to 2016, when he was promoted to editor for business and strategy, overseeing TV and film projects, books, and the launch of New York’s online shopping site The Strategist. “We realized that there was an opportunity for the same kind of service journalism we’ve been perfecting and focusing on for decades to be applied to internet shopping,” he later told Nieman Lab.

In his time at the magazine prior to becoming editor-in-chief, Haskell edited nearly 300 features and 14 special issues, including New York’s 50th anniversary issue, “My New York” and the Obama presidency retrospective, “Hope and What Came After.” He also oversaw the commemorative book Highbrow, Lowbrow, Brilliant, Despicable: Fifty Years of New York, published by Simon & Schuster, and a public art project where the magazine invited 50 New York artists, including Hank Willis Thomas, Yoko Ono, and Barbara Kruger, to create covers for the magazine.

In January 2019 it was announced that Haskell would succeed Adam Moss as editor-in-chief of New York, taking the helm that April. Recode described Haskell's task as “one of the hardest jobs in media: replacing a beloved magazine editor.” CBS Sunday Morning aired a profile of New York during this period of transition and Haskell said of his vision for the magazine, “I don't think we're ever gonna be your first read of the day. But I think – I hope – we'll be your favorite.”

In April 2019, Haskell published “The Stolen Kids of Sarah Lawrence”, which documented how Larry Ray coerced and abused students through cult-leader tactics. After the article was published, Ray was investigated by U.S. attorneys and charged with 17 counts, including extortion and abuse. His trial began on March 10, 2022.

In June 2019 Haskell published writer E. Jean Carroll's headline-making account of being sexually assaulted by the sitting president as a cover story. Carroll told the New York Times that she decided to publish her account in New York rather than Elle Magazine, where she was advice columnist, because New York “knows how to break news.” She subsequently filed a defamation lawsuit against Donald Trump after he called her a liar in response to the story.

New York's parent company New York Media merged with Vox Media in 2019.

In October 2020, Haskell brought the website Curbed into New York.

Haskell has brought notable journalists to New York including Hanna Rosin, Scott Galloway, Lindsay Peoples Wagner, Kerry Howley, Choire Sicha, Errol Louis, Andrea Long Chu, and Sam Sanders.

== Awards and honors ==
In Haskell's first year as editor-in-chief, New York was named Hottest Magazine of the Year by Adweek, which noted, “New York has given new life to the print format while also reimagining how to translate a bustling digital news operation to print—and readers have noticed." He was also named to Adweek's Creative 100 in 2020.

Haskell was named to the Out 100 in 2019, which mentioned that under his leadership New York “open[ed] its arms to queer culture.”

New York won the American Society of Magazine Editors’ Cover of the Year contest in 2020 for a cover on Donald Trump’s potential impeachment. The magazine was also a finalist for 9 National Magazine Awards in 2020 and its architecture critic Justin Davidson was a finalist for the Pulitzer Prize in criticism the same year.

In 2021, Haskell was chosen as Adweek's Publishing Editor of the Year and New York was a finalist for 8 National Magazine Awards, more than any other publication.

== Forum for Urban Design ==
From 2005 to 2007 Haskell was executive director of the Forum for Urban Design, where he was an early proponent of bike-sharing in New York City. He wrote a New York Times op-ed that helped launch a public conversation that ultimately led to Citibike launching. “A ride-share program would reduce the dependency on automobiles. It would be a great alternative to subways and bus services — and a lot cheaper for the city,” he told the Times in 2007.

== Kings County Distillery ==
At the height of the 2009 recession, Haskell co-founded Kings County Distillery in Bushwick, Brooklyn, with his former Yale roommate Colin Spoelman. It was the first distillery in New York City since prohibition. The distillery subsequently moved to the Brooklyn Navy Yard.

Among other accolades, Kings County Distillery was named 2016 Distillery of the Year by Distilling Magazine, its bourbon received three stars from The New York Times and was named best small batch bourbon in the 2020 San Francisco World Spirits Competition; and its whiskey received a 2020 Craft Spirit Award.

In response to widespread hand sanitizer shortages at the start of the coronavirus pandemic, Kings County Distillery began distilling alcohol for sanitizer. Haskell co-authored two books with the distillery, both published by Abrams Books: Kings County Distillery Guide to Urban Moonshining and Dead Distillers: A History of the Upstarts and Outlaws Who Made American Spirits.

== Ceramics ==
Haskell is also a ceramist and sculptor represented by Donzella LTD, a New York City gallery. The interior designer Celerie Kembel said of his work: “I love David Haskell’s ceramic works for being warm, modern minimalist vessels (think Brancusi goes to Joshua Tree). They evoke the feeling of plants, rocks, and sculpture intertwined.”
