= Adam Moss =

American magazine and newspaper editor

- Occupation: Newspaper/magazine editor
- Title: Former editor-in-chief of New York

Adam Moss is an American magazine and newspaper editor. From 2004 to 2019, he was the editor-in-chief of New York magazine. During his tenure, New York won more National Magazine Awards than any other magazine overall, including Magazine of the Year in 2013 and General Excellence both in print and online in 2010. He oversaw the development and growth of New York’s website, launching the standalone sites Vulture and The Cut, among others. He is also the author of The Work of Art: How Something Comes From Nothing (2024).

== Early career ==
Moss spent six years in various editorial capacities at Esquire magazine. Northwestern Journalism professor David Abrahamson credits Moss's work at Esquire in assigning a series of pieces on the business of entertainment with "having a serious effect on what we all regard as the normal content of the mainstream media today, with its unremitting emphasis on not only celebrity, but also the economics of the celebrity-driven industries."

Moss first came to media attention as the founder of 7 Days, a weekly news magazine covering New York City arts and culture. Founded in 1988, it went out of business during the publishing-business recession of 1990, the week before it won a National Magazine Award for General Excellence. A number of 7 Days writers and editors, including Moss, were hired by The New York Times.

According to media writer Michael Wolff in a 1999 profile of Moss in New York magazine: "It is hard to overstate what kind of magazine-world hero Moss became with 7 Days and its particular pop-culture idiom, and what kind of success failure can be." A 2003 profile of Moss in the Oberlin alumni magazine notes, "Concepts introduced by Moss in 7 Days would later insinuate themselves into The Times (take the wedding narratives in the Sunday Styles section; visceral stuff cleverly packaged)."

== The New York Times Magazine ==
Moss became editor of The New York Times Magazine in 1998 and went on to serve in 2003 as the paper's assistant managing editor for features, overseeing the Magazine, Book Review, Culture and Style sections. He brought to the Times a magazine sensibility. "Moss became a guru of this change – an anti-Times sort of figure in the middle of the Times. A magazine person at a newspaper, an openly gay person in a repressed atmosphere, a mild man among bullies and screamers," described Michael Wolff in the 1999 profile of Moss. When Ad Age named him Editor of the Year in 2001, the writer Jon Fine called the Times Magazine "one of the best reads in the business. Mr. Moss smartly and subtly remade the title, from its photography to front of the book, all the while navigating the internal culture of the Times. Under his watch, it became a showcase for thoughtful, long-form journalism. Like few other magazines, it thrives a few steps to the side of celeb-saturated culture and a few steps beyond the typical political polarities." Moss shifted the balance of writers from Times staffers to nonfiction writers experienced in magazine journalism. During his time there, the magazine included as regular contributors Michael Lewis, Andrew Sullivan, Michael Pollan, Lynn Hirschberg, Jennifer Egan, and Frank Rich, among others.

In 2001, the writer Michael Finkel was discovered to have created composite characters for a story he had written on the African slave trade, a small scandal that was quickly eclipsed at The New York Times by the much larger one involving Jayson Blair. After the September 11 attacks, Moss and the Times Magazine created an issue of the magazine called "Remains of the Day" that was published online in its entirety that Friday, the first time the magazine published in digital form before print. Its 2001 story “One Awful Night in Thanh Phong” revealed former senator and one-time presidential candidate Bob Kerrey to have led a particularly brutal attack on a peasant village in Vietnam that one of his fellow team members described in terms that invoked some similarities to the My-Lai massacre. Mr. Kerrey disputed the characterization. The story was nominated that year for a Pulitzer Prize.

== New York ==
In his first year at New York, Moss completed an extensive renovation of the weekly magazine emphasizing an enhanced commitment to covering cultural happenings in the city and beyond (in "The Culture Pages") and introducing the "Strategist" section, a fun and indispensable urban sourcebook. At the time, Moss told Women's Wear Daily, "A lot of what we're doing with all of this renovation is actually restoration. Going back to the vault in various places during various eras of the magazine and trying to...modernize it and make sense of our time." Moss has launched new columns (John Heilemann's "The Power Grid" and Rebecca Traister's "The Body Politic" among them), ushered in a new generation of writers and photographers, and increased the magazine's political and business coverage. Moss is widely credited with restoring the luster the magazine enjoyed during its early years under legendary founder Clay Felker. "New York gives you an opportunity to talk about pretty much anything, all funneled through a single topic that its readers are passionate about, which is New York," Moss told Crain's New York Business in 2007. "That's the formula Clay Felker invented, and it's a great one."

In 2006 Moss oversaw a year-long relaunch of the magazine's flagship website, nymag.com, transforming it from a magazine companion site into a redesigned, up-to-the minute news and information site. Monthly unique users at the magazine's websites—NYmag.com, Vulture.com, The Cut, Intelligencer, the Strategist, and Grub Street, have grown immensely since then, to a record 53 million in May 2018. Washington Post media critic Howard Kurtz noted in a 2009 profile, "Moss' signature accomplishment may be the development of a thriving Web site."

In a tribute to the magazine's late owner Bruce Wasserstein, The New York Times media critic David Carr wrote, "Mr. Wasserstein gets credit for selecting Adam Moss, the former editor of The New York Times Magazine, who has demonstrated significant skills in putting the magazine and its Web site in the middle of the Manhattan conversation, but Mr. Wasserstein gets even more credit for staying out of the way and allowing Mr. Moss and his colleagues to do their jobs." Almost a year later, in another one of his Times columns, Carr remarked, "One of the charms of the publishing business is that a single person can have an outsize effect, and many would suggest that Mr. Moss, with his deft hand for provocative covers and smart assignments, is one of the best editors working in a hybrid age." In 2018 New York's senior art critic Jerry Saltz won the Pulitzer Prize for Criticism.

In January 2019, Moss announced that he was stepping down and leaving the magazine.

== Awards ==
During his tenure New York won 40 National Magazine Awards (more than any other publication over this time period), including Magazine of the Year, six for General Excellence in print and six for General Excellence online or website, as well as awards for Video, Profile Writing, Essays, Personal Service, seven for the Strategist section and two for the Culture Pages section, four for the magazine's design, and two each for Single-Topic Issue, Leisure Interests, and online fashion coverage.

Moss was three times named Editor of the Year by Advertising Age – in 2017 and 2007 for his work at New York and in 2001 for his work at The New York Times Magazine. He was named Editor of the Year by Adweek in 2016. He was awarded an honorary Doctor of Humanities degree from his alma mater Oberlin College in 2005, and the Missouri Honor Medal for Distinguished Service in Journalism in 2012.

== Books ==
Moss is the author of the New York Times best-seller The Work of Art: How Something Comes From Nothing, which Ari Shapiro described as a "visual feast, full of drafts, sketches, and scribbled notebook pages." He also co-edited several books while at New York: New York Look Book: A Gallery of Street Fashion, New York Stories: Landmark Writing From Four Decades of New York Magazine, My First New York: Early Adventures in the Big City (As Remembered by Actors, Artists, Athletes, Chefs, Comedians, Filmmakers, Mayors, Models, Moguls, Porn Stars, Rockers, Writers, and Others), In Season: More Than 150 Fresh and Simple Recipes from New York Magazine Inspired by Farmers’ Market Ingredients, Highbrow, Lowbrow, Brilliant, Despicable: 50 Years of New York, and The Encyclopedia of New York.

== Personal life ==
Moss lives in Greenwich Village with his husband Daniel Kaizer. Moss is a 1979 graduate of Oberlin College.

== See also ==
- LGBT culture in New York City
- List of LGBT people from New York City
- Literary analysis
- New Yorkers in journalism
- NYC Pride March
