= Kings County Distillery =

Distillery in Brooklyn, New York City

Coordinates: 40°41′59″N 73°58′48″W

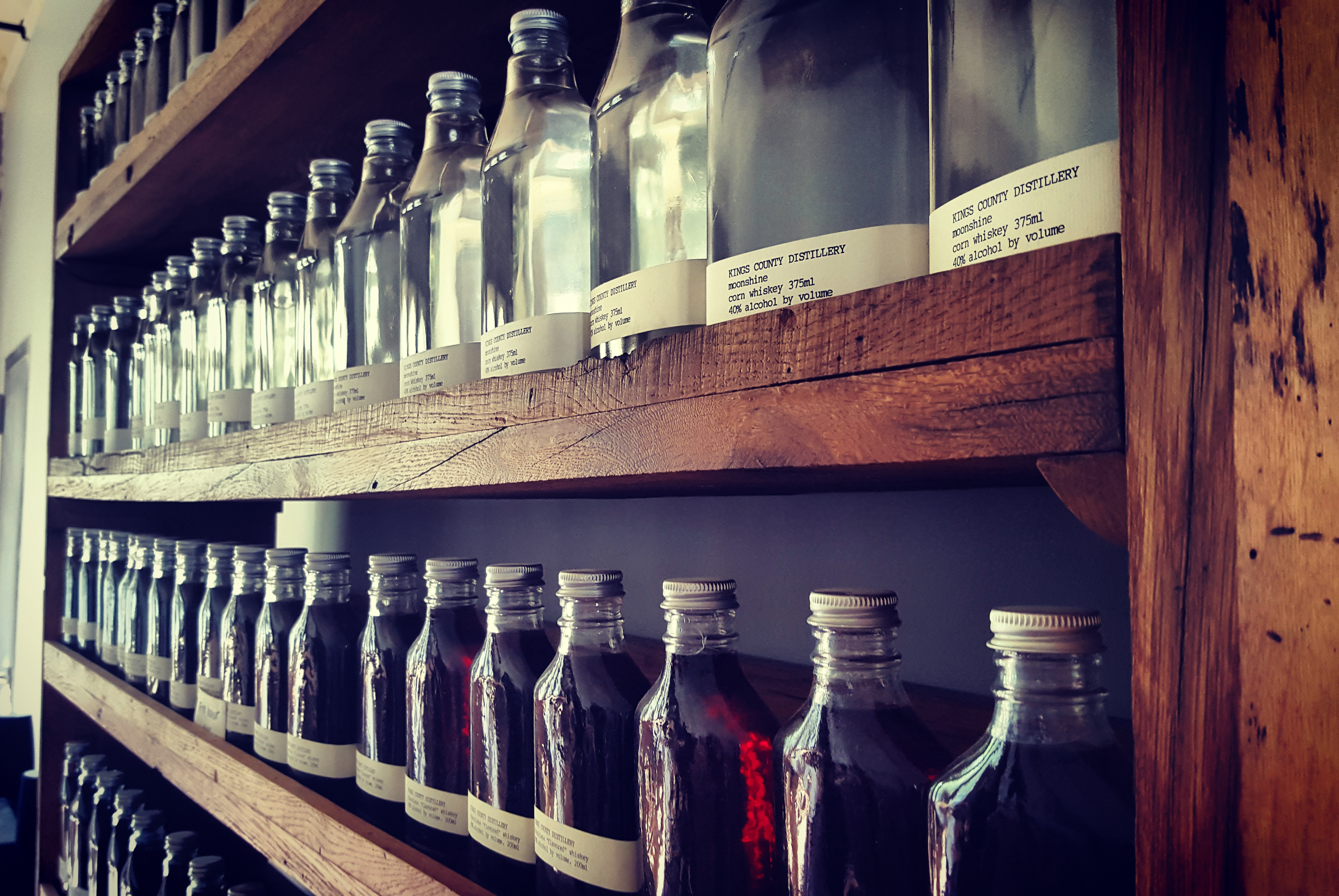
- Company type: Private
- Industry: Microdistillery
- Founded: New York City, New York, 2009; 17 years ago
- Founder: David Haskell; Colin Spoelman
- Headquarters: New York City, New York, United States
- Area served: New York City
- Number of employees: 20
- Website: http://www.kingscountydistillery.com

Kings County Distillery is a distillery located at the Brooklyn Navy Yard in Brooklyn, New York City. It produces corn whiskey, bourbon whiskey, and rye whiskey, as well as other American craft whiskeys. It has been described as the oldest operating distillery in New York City.

== History ==
Kings County Distillery was founded by Colin Spoelman and David Haskell in 2009, spurred by changes in New York State law regarding the licensing of microdistilleries. It officially began production out of its 330 square feet (31 m^{2}) warehouse in April 2010 The name "Kings County" refers to the official county designation of Brooklyn.

In 2012, the distillery moved into the Brooklyn Navy Yard and installed copper whiskey stills imported from Scotland. The distillery focuses on American whiskeys, being named part of America's New Whiskey Rebellion by Whiskey Advocate, with unusual whiskeys like a Peated Bourbon, American Single Malt, and a craft Bottled in bond bourbon. The distillery also makes Empire Rye, a project to establish a new standard of identity for New York-made rye with other craft distillers.

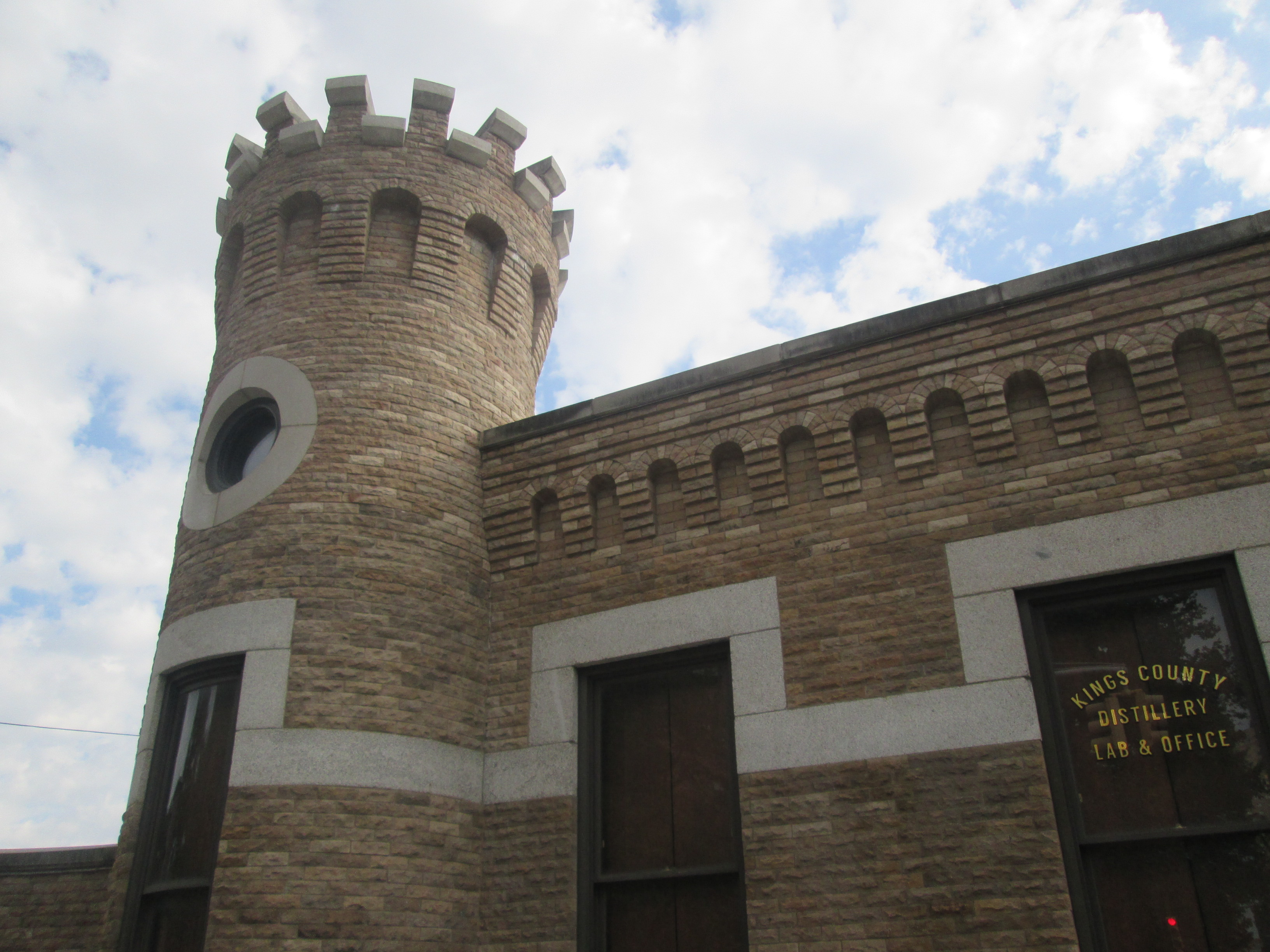
The Sands Street gate, where Kings County Distillery's tasting room is located

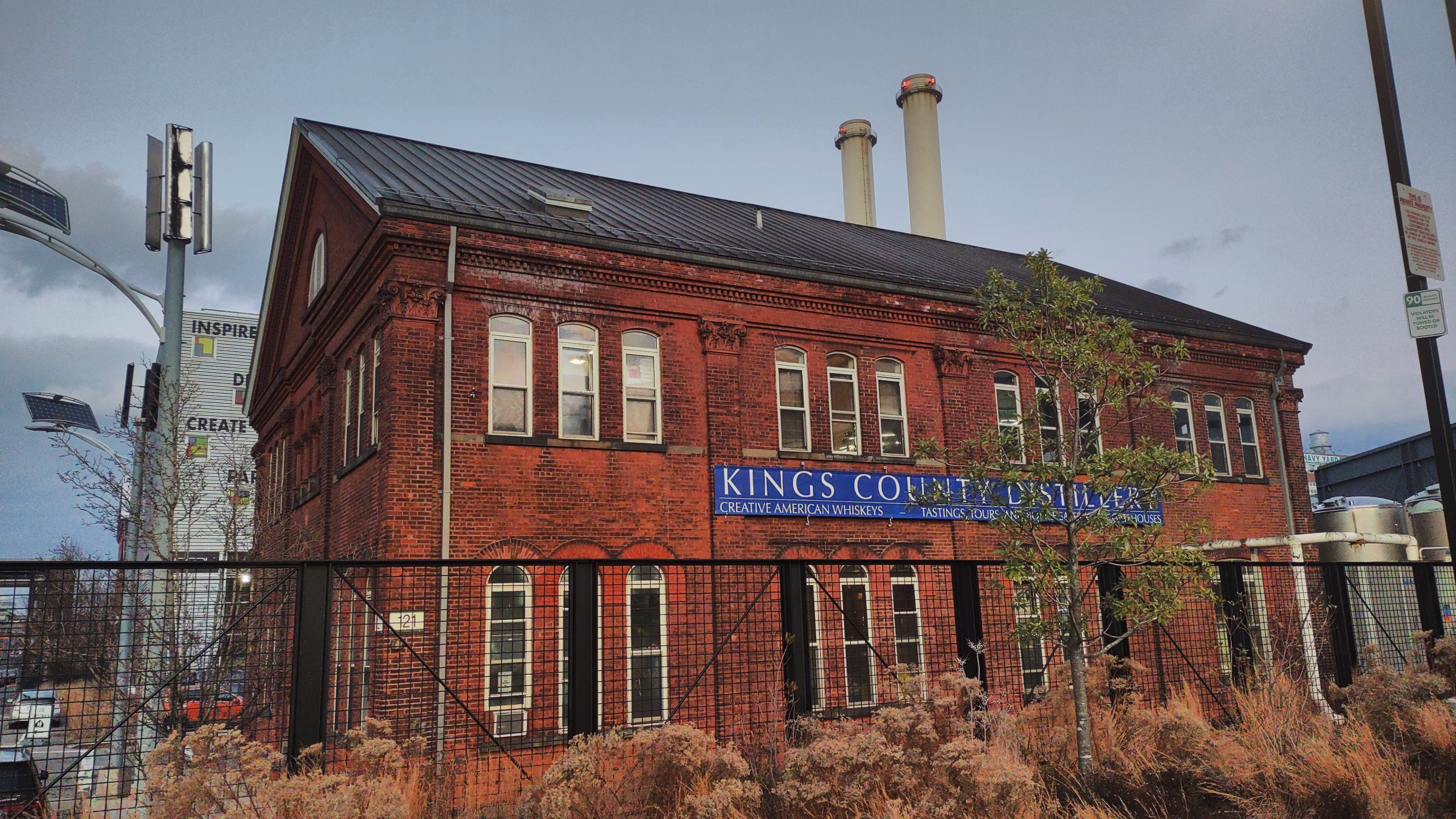

In 2016, Kings County Distillery opened The Gatehouses, a tasting room in the historic Sands Street gate of the Brooklyn Navy Yard.

In 2026, Kings County Distillery celebrated its millionth bottle of whiskey sold.

== Products ==
Kings County began by releasing an unaged corn whiskey, and later had a wider portfolio of whiskeys aged 2–7 years. Originally, due to small production, only 200 mL bottles were sold; as the business expanded, it began selling 375 mL bottles and 750 mL bottles by 2019.

- Kings County Moonshine
- Kings County Straight Bourbon Whiskey
- Kings County Peated Bourbon
- Kings County Single Malt Whiskey
- Kings County Bottled-in-Bond Bourbon
- Kings County Empire Rye
- Kings County Chocolate Whiskey

== Awards ==
In 2016, Kings County Distillery was named "Distillery of the Year" by the American Distilling Institute.
