= Ref Rodriguez =

American politician

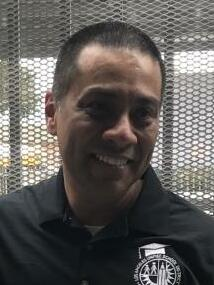
- Rodriguez in 2017

Los Angeles Unified School District Board of Education for the 5th district
- In office May 19, 2015 – July 23, 2018
- Preceded by: Bennett Kayser
- Succeeded by: Jackie Goldberg

President, Los Angeles Unified School District Board of Education
- In office July 7, 2017 – September 19, 2017
- Preceded by: Steve Zimmer
- Succeeded by: Monica Garcia

Personal details
- Born: 1972 (age 53–54) Cypress Park, Los Angeles
- Education: Fielding Graduate University (PhD); Loyola Marymount University (B.A.)
- Criminal information
- Criminal charges: One felony count each of conspiracy 25 misdemeanor counts of assumed name contribution
- Penalty: Three years’ probation, 60 days of community service

Refugio Rodriguez (born 1972) is an American educator and politician, who served as President of the Los Angeles Unified School District Board of Education in 2017. He served as a member of the Board from 2015 until his resignation in 2018, and currently serves as an adjunct professor at Santa Ana College.

== Early life and career ==
Rodriguez grew up in Cypress Park, Los Angeles and was the first of five children of Mexican immigrants to graduate from college, earning a bachelor's degree from Loyola Marymount University and a PhD from Fielding Graduate University.

He returned to his home neighborhood after college to co-found Partnerships to Uplift Communities (PUC), a public charter school program, with Jacqueline Elliot. He also lectured at Loyola Marymount University and was appointed by Governor Jerry Brown to the California Commission on Teacher Credentialing in 2013.

== Career ==
=== LAUSD Board of Education ===
==== District 5 election and tenure (2014–2018) ====
In November 2014, Rodriguez announced that he would be running for a seat in the Board of Education and raised $50,000 during the first campaign reporting period. He ran against incumbent Bennett Kayser and Andrew Thomas, a professor at Walden University. He maintained that he would do more for the District than pander to charter schools.

On July 7, 2017, Rodriguez was elected as the president of the Board of Education by a 4–3 vote. The four votes were newly elected members Kelly Gonez and Nick Melvoin, reelected member Mónica García, and Rodriguez himself.

==== Campaign contribution scandal (2017–2018) ====
LA County District Attorney Jackie Lacey charged Rodriguez with three felony charges of conspiracy, perjury, and procuring and offering a false or forged instrument. The case was linked back to Rodriguez's bid for the board in 2014, with he and cousin Elizabeth Tinajero Melendrez reimbursing $25,000 to his campaign donors, most of whom were family and friends. In January 2015, Rodriguez reported in his first campaign disclosure statement that more than $51,000 had come from family, friends, and other people, but half actually had come from himself. On September 20, 2017, the United Teachers Los Angeles called for the resignation of Rodriguez.

On September 19, 2017, Rodriguez stepped down as president amid charges of perjury and other felonies. Although stepping down, he remained on the board. On October 24, 2017, he pleaded not guilty to the charges. On July 23, 2018, Rodriguez pleaded guilty to a felony count of conspiracy and four misdemeanor counts, and as part of a deal with prosecutors, resigned from office. Ten candidates ran to replace Rodriguez, and he was replaced by Jackie Goldberg in 2019.

=== Santa Ana College ===
In March, 2023, Rodriquez was hired by Santa Ana College as the head of Career Education/Dual Enrollment amid community criticism.

== Controversies ==
=== Conflict of interest case ===
On October 13, 2017, a conflict of interest complaint was filed against Rodriguez by a charter school network that he founded. A week later, on October 24, 2017, the California Fair Political Practices Commission closed the case, citing his conspiracy charges filed by the Los Angeles District Attorney's Office. The conflict of interest case did not have any relation to his felony case.

=== 2018 arrest ===
On March 16, 2018, Rodriguez was arrested at The Paseo at around 4:30 p.m. for suspicion of public intoxication. He was released without being charged or cited, with Rodriguez thanking the officers for "being kind and seeing this for the non- event that it was.”

== Elections ==
2015 Los Angeles Unified School District District 5 primary election
Primary election
Candidate	Votes	%
Ref Rodriguez	10,355	38.6
Bennett Kayser (incumbent)	9,510	35.5
Andrew Thomas	6,946	25.9
Total votes	26,811	100.00
General election
Ref Rodriguez	14,201	53.3
Bennett Kayser (incumbent)	12,421	46.7
Total votes	26,622	100.00
