= Yucca Corridor, Los Angeles =

Yucca Corridor
- Neighborhood of Los Angeles
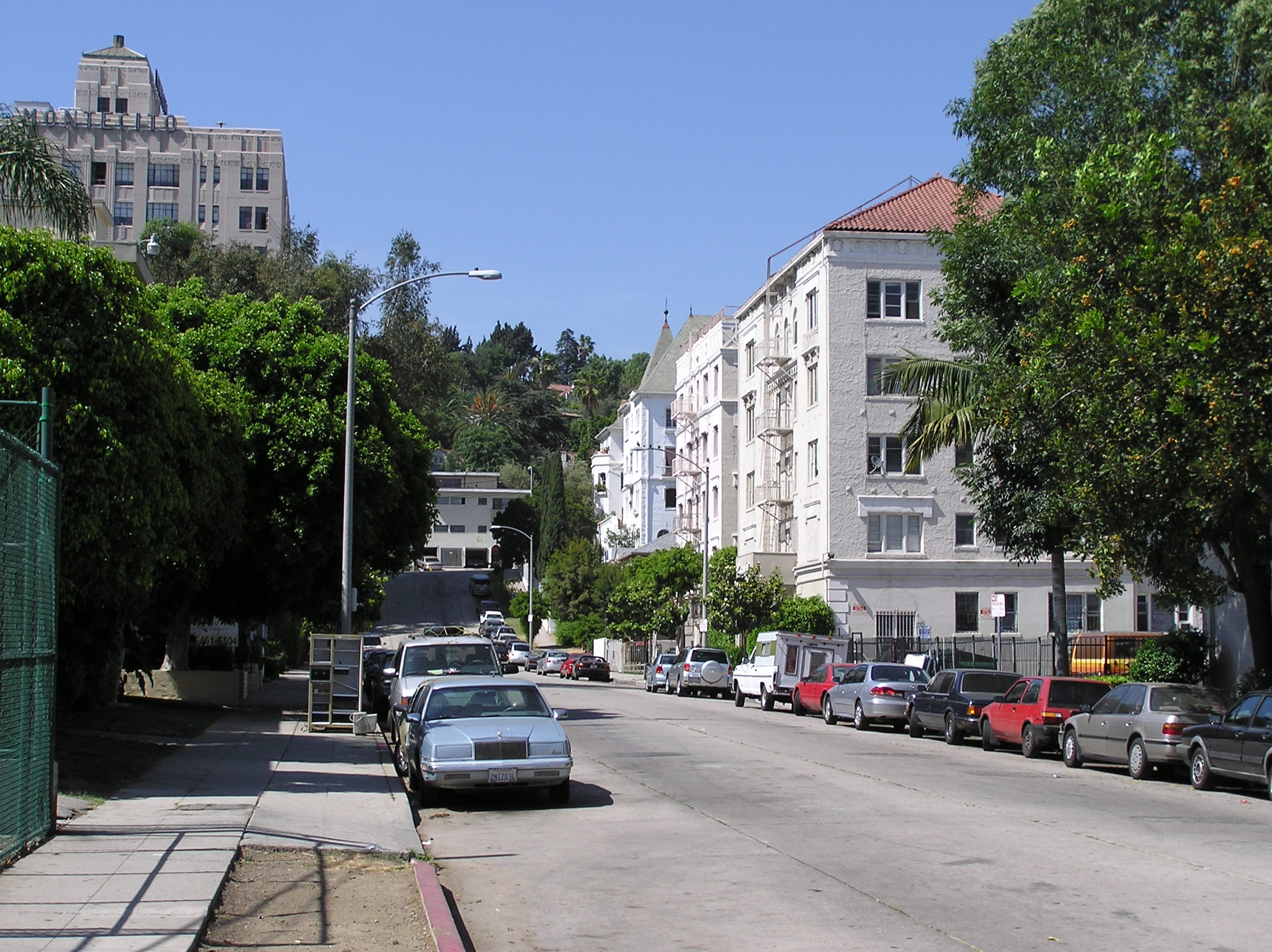
- Cherokee Avenue, 2004
- Interactive map of Yucca Corridor
- Coordinates: 34.104065°N 118.328071°W
- Country: United States
- State: California
- County: Los Angeles
- City: Los Angeles
- Time zone: UTC-8 (PST)
  - Summer (DST): UTC-7 (PDT)

The Yucca Corridor is a '"formerly notorious" and "once crime-ridden" stretch of Yucca Street in Hollywood, California, north of Hollywood Boulevard and Grauman's Chinese Theater. In 2007 it was said to be "a hub for young professionals, artists, musicians and actors."

== Geography ==
The Yucca Corridor Coalition of Property Owners and Managers delineates Yucca Corridor as bounded on the west by North Highland Avenue, on the north by Franklin Avenue, on the east by Vine Street and on the south by a line "just north of Hollywood Boulevard." In 2007 apartment condominiums were under development, but dwellers in the Corridor were mostly renters, and "mostly singles just starting their careers." In that year boutiques lined Yucca Street, which was described as "a trendy shopping spot hoping to rival Melrose Avenue" as a commercial center. Area nightclubs were said to "bolster the Yucca Corridor's thriving night life."

== History ==
By 1993 the Corridor had been dominated for several years by the 18th Street Gang, according to Sharon Romero, leader of the Hollywood Beautification Team, which was formed to paint over graffiti, among other projects. She said gang members had "harassed us on the streets, pulled guns on us and kicked our paint cans over." Between May and July of that year the Los Angeles Police Department engaged in a concerted effort to rid the area of gang activity, including the use of additional police and Bureau of Tobacco and Firearms officers. A 1994 survey by the city's Falcon narcotics program said that the Corridor was one of L.A.'s most drug-infested neighborhoods. The Falcon narcotics abatement unit was a multi-agency narcotics abatement effort comprised by prosecutors from the Los Angeles City Attorney's Office, including a community organizer, LAPD officers and an inspector from the Los Angeles Department of Building and Safety. They worked pro-actively to address narcotics and nuisance activity. The community organizer helped start community groups in the area taught property owners about concepts like crime prevention through environmental design and encouraged property managers to meet and coordinate efforts to improve their neighborhood. In 1995 the police were calling the area a "dope supermarket, ... where cocaine dealers ruled the streets and residents hid behind their doors from gunfire after dark."

We spent about three years organizing tenants and property owners, not against each other, but to work together to change the housing picture in places like the Yucca corridor. We ran out the drug dealers and the slum lords.

— City Council member Jackie Goldberg in 1997

in 1994, however, landowners, impressed by the use of a video camera in the Rodney King episode, began mounting cameras atop buildings, focused on the sidewalks below. They also affixed posters in the neighborhood warning "Buy Drugs, Go to Jail" and "Entering Videotape Surveillance Zone." Volunteer monitors scanned video screens at a nearby police station. Narcotics officers "made nearly 500 arrests and confiscated hundreds of grams of cocaine and heroin during an intensive 18-month campaign. Prosecutors pressed landlords to fence off open lots and board up vacant buildings," places where drug dealers congregated. Building inspectors cited owners for broken windows and other violations. These projects were spearheaded by neighborhood watch groups named after local streets, such as the Ivar Hawks, Cherokee Condors and Wilcox Werewolves. Civil libertarians, though, took issue with some aspects of the crime-prevention program. Constitutional law expert Erwin Chemerinsky, for example, said he was "troubled by having behavior monitored directly or indirectly by the government, absent probable cause," and others objected to the police attempting to identify suspected drug buyers through license-plate numbers.

In another crime-fighting move, the city's Neighborhood Recovery Program sponsored neighborhood marches in 1996, and streets were reconfigured for one-way traffic. That was the same year that three dilapidated buildings near Yucca Street and Las Palmas Avenue, made uninhabitable by the Northridge earthquake, were demolished and plans were made to build a community center in their stead. The damage done by the earthquake resulted in the destruction of many old buildings and, it was reported, and eventually led to its transition into a "safer, tourist-friendly place."

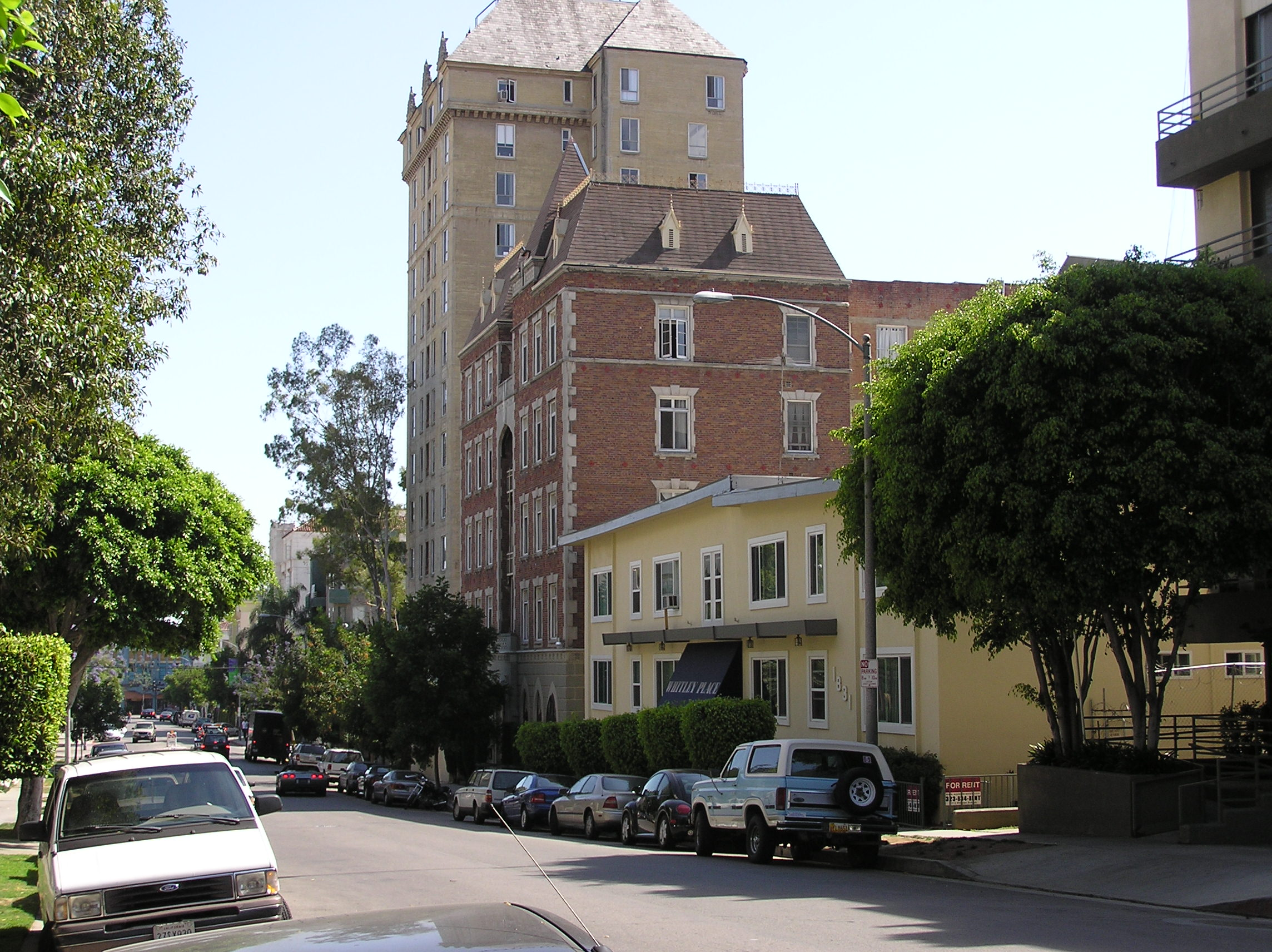
Whitley Avenue, 2005

By 1999, neighborhood activists were turning their attention to a perceived glut of liquor stores and nightclubs all over Hollywood occasioned by an uptick in applications for liquor licenses. Particularly opposed was an application by a 16,800-square-foot Sav-on drugstore at Yucca and North Cahuenga Boulevard. A neighborhood group also claimed that clubs in the Yucca-Ivar Avenue area had been the sites of large fights, and it was noted that the Corridor still suffered 20 percent more reported crime than the city average.

In 2007, a Los Angeles Times survey of the area found that "Homicides are down but the neighborhood still has a relatively high rate of robberies, burglaries, thefts and assaults. Residents and community activists say they walk freely through the Yucca Corridor during the day but do so with more caution after nightfall."

== Gateway to Hollywood ==
In 2002, a 30-foot-high triangular glass tower, lighted from within, was installed in a traffic median at the intersection of Cahuenga Boulevard, Wilcox Avenue and Franklin Avenue. The $658,000 structure features the word "HOLLYWOOD" running vertically down its three sides and was designed to greet visitors who enter Hollywood from the Cahuenga offramp of the Hollywood Freeway.

== Bicycle route ==
As part of a $200,000 traffic improvement project, eight-tenths of a mile of Yucca Street, between Cahuenga Boulevard and Highland Avenue, became Los Angeles's first "bike-friendly street" in 2012. At some intersections concrete bollards and signage directed automobiles to turn off the street while bicyclists were allowed to proceed straight ahead. Traffic had been diverted at Las Palmas Avenue, Cherokee Avenune and Whitley Avenue before the project began. The blue municipal street signs were modified to include an artist's representation of a bicycle in a contrasting color, green. The curbings at each automobile diverter were cut into paths wide enough for bikes and pedestrians, with the outline of a bicycle painted on the sidewalk as a sharrow, or shared-lane marking.

== Education ==
Public schools serving Yucca Corridor are Selma Avenue Elementary School, Joseph LeConte Middle School and Hollywood High School.
