= College ACB =

College ACB (or College Anonymous Confession Board) was a website that allowed students from over 500 colleges across the United States to post anonymously about gossip, rumors, rants, and discussions with people and college-related activities. The website is no longer in service.

College ACB described itself as "designed to give students a place to vent, rant, and talk to college peers in an environment free from social constraints and about subjects that might otherwise be taboo" and claims to promote "deep and thoughtful discussion". Recently it was bought by Blipdar and no longer exists in its previous form. In October 2011, Blipdar was taken offline.

College ACB separates itself from its predecessor JuicyCampus by allowing several user friendly features and the ability to regulate boards by reporting any posts that may come across as offensive.

== Features ==
Peter Frank has taken steps to separate College ACB from the failed JuicyCampus by allowing a large amount of user regulation. Each post of College ACB is given a report button. If a student feels that a certain post is offensive, they are able to report the post and have it removed. Furthermore, the website allows for users to post comments and suggestions that they believe will help to improve the website, and other users are given the option to vote on those suggestions. As a registered user, College ACB also states it allows you to experience several other features such as "private messaging, identity swapping, and [the ability to] mark your favorite threads".

== History ==
The website was opened in early 2008 under the name JHUConfessions.com by two recent university graduate students, Andrew Mann of Johns Hopkins University and Aaron Larner of Wesleyan University. Then, the site was only at a Johns Hopkins University. The site expanded to schools where Andrew and Aaron had friends, including Dickinson, Haverford, and Wesleyan. Peter Frank, also a student of Wesleyan University, class of 2012, ran the site from February 2009 through January 24, 2011, when he formally announced his decision to sell his share in the site to an undisclosed third party. On February 1, 2010, the website reached a record with over "900,000 impressions [in one day]".

== Controversy ==
Despite its success, College ACB has seen its share of controversy due to its similar gossip and rumor style to its predecessor JuicyCampus. University students interviewed by Time magazine described College ACB as "ranging from the helpful ... to sex fantasies, gossiping, teasing friends, ... [and] a lot of hate". Several college students, such as Jared Sichel of Tulane University have openly stated that they want their college administration to "Ban College ACB" due to the harm that it can cause to students. Peter Frank states that his website allows students to "build a community" and exercise their rights to free speech, but by allowing students freedom to post what they want, College ACB welcomes bashing of other students and provokes personal attacks that are often rooted in rumors.

Ryan Mueller of Truman State University states that College ACB "can cause damage to people's reputations and [give] others a false impression" thereby harming or damaging students' emotional state. Despite the controversy surrounding College ACB, Peter Frank himself is virtually free of lawsuits that would eliminate College ACB due to the Communications Decency Act of 1996 which states that "operators of Internet services are not to be construed as publishers and thus not legally liable for the words of third parties who use their services". In early 2010, Amber Pickett, a communication major at the University of Tennessee at Martin began spearheading a campaign that would remove the university from College ACB, stating that "there is a point where you can abuse your freedom of speech".
