= Manchester Action on Street Health =

UK organisation providing support to female sex workers

- Abbreviation: MASH
- Established: 1991 (35 years ago)
- Types: charitable organization
- Legal status: company limited by guarantee
- Headquarters: Manchester
- Revenue: 1,509,268 pound sterling (2025)
- Employees: 30 (2025)
- Volunteers: 60 (2025)
- Website: mash.org.uk

Manchester Action on Street Health (MASH) is a charity that provides support to female sex workers, offering a range of confidential and non-judgmental services to help keep them safe and healthy.

== History ==
MASH was founded in Manchester in 1991. Initially the service provided condoms and clean injecting equipment to the workers, along with advice, information and referrals towards other services. In 2010 the charity moved into the MASH Centre on Fairfield Street in Manchester city centre.

== Mission ==
MASH works closely with female sex workers to promote sexual health, wellbeing and personal safety, whilst offering choice, support and empowerment to encourage positive life changes.

== The MASH Centre ==
The MASH Centre provides a range of services for sex workers, including a sexual health clinic, needle exchange, therapeutic services and life skills support. Any woman working in the sex industry can drop in to the centre to make use of these services. The MASH staff work to build relationships with the women, from which they can offer long-term casework support and help address issues such as drug addiction, housing and money problems.

== Services ==
MASH offers a wide range of services for female sex workers, including planned one-on-one support, counselling, drug and alcohol support and safety advice. These services are offered from the MASH Centre, allowing women to drop in at a time that suits them. An Outreach Team also takes the services onto the streets and into the saunas where women work.

== Corporate support ==
MASH is supported by many organisations and businesses across and outside of Manchester. MASH and charity supporters Dial2Donate built up a rapport after a suggestion from the Manchester branch of the Women's Institute. Dial2Donate made a donation of £500 to MASH to help maintain their outreach vehicle.

== Awards ==
In 2013 MASH won a National Ugly Mugs Star Project Accreditation for good practice. In 2015 MASH won an award for breaking through in volunteering at Manchester City Council's International Women's Day Awards. Shortly after, the team won a Charity Achievement Award of £1,000 from The Lloyds Bank Foundation Charity Achievement Awards.

== See also ==
- National Ugly Mugs, also based in Manchester
