= Clay Felker =

American magazine editor and journalist

- Born: Clay Schuette Felker; October 2, 1925; Webster Groves, Missouri, US
- Died: July 1, 2008 (aged 82); New York City, US
- Education: Duke University
- Occupations: Journalist, editor
- Known for: Co-founded New York magazine
- Board member of: Duke Magazine Editorial Board
- Spouse(s): Leslie Blatt (m. 1949-div. 19??) Pamela Tiffin (m. 1962; div. 1969) Gail Sheehy (m. 1984)

Clay Schuette Felker (October 2, 1925 – July 1, 2008) was an American magazine editor and journalist who co-founded New York magazine in 1968 and California magazine (first known as New West) in 1976. He was known for bringing numerous journalists into the profession. The New York Times wrote in 1995, "Few journalists have left a more enduring imprint on late 20th-century journalism—an imprint that was unabashedly mimicked even as it was being mocked—than Clay Felker."

== Early life ==
He was born in 1925 in Webster Groves, Missouri, son of Carl Felker, an editor of The Sporting News, and his wife, the former Cora Tyree, the former women's editor of the St. Louis Post-Dispatch. Both of Clay's parents, along with a grandfather and a grandmother, graduated from the University of Missouri School of Journalism. He had one sibling, Charlotte. Felker's grandfather, Henry Clay Felker, of German aristocratic origins, fled Germany after the 1848 Conservative takeover. The family surname was originally von Fredrikstein.

Felker attended Duke University, where he first became interested in journalism and edited the student newspaper, The Duke Chronicle. He left school in 1943 to join the Navy, but returned to the school to graduate in 1951.

In 1983, he founded the editorial board for the alumni publication Duke Magazine. Duke awarded Felker an honorary degree in 1998, as well as the Futrell Award for Excellence in Communications and Journalism. Duke Magazine created the staff position of Clay Felker Fellow for "an aspiring journalist with unusual promise."

== Career ==
After graduation, Felker worked as a sportswriter for Life magazine. He developed an article he wrote about Casey Stengel as a full-length book, Casey Stengel's Secret (1961). He was on the development team for Sports Illustrated and was features editor for Esquire. He later worked for Time.

Felker gave Gloria Steinem what she later called her first "serious assignment", regarding contraception; he didn't like her first draft and had her re-write the article. Her resulting 1962 article, about the way in which women are forced to choose between a career and marriage, preceded Betty Friedan's book The Feminine Mystique by one year. Steinem joined the founding staff of Felker's New York magazine and became politically active in the feminist movement. Felker funded the first issue of Ms. magazine, founded by Steinem and other feminist leaders.

After losing a battle for Esquire editorship to Harold Hayes, Felker left to join The New York Herald Tribune in 1962. He revamped a Sunday section into New York and hired writers such as Tom Wolfe and Jimmy Breslin. The section became the "hottest Sunday read in town."

A long-time friend of Wolfe, Felker was one of the early proponents of New Journalism and key to its emergence. The New York Herald Tribune closed its doors in 1966. Felker later, in 1968, reconstituted the Sunday section as New York magazine. After founding New York in 1968, one of his first features was Wolfe's coverage of Ken Kesey and his Merry Pranksters. Wolfe expanded this account into his non-fiction novel The Electric Kool-Aid Acid Test.

New York became one of the most imitated magazines of its time, both from a design perspective and in the way it combined service and life-style articles. "He had the crass but revolutionary (revolutionary in the sense that it overthrew generations of class conceits) notion that you are what you buy. He sniffed the great consumer revolution with its social, political, and aesthetic implications. And New York Magazine became the first magazine to spell out where to get the goods (and at the best price)", wrote Michael Wolff about Felker in New York's 35th anniversary issue.

Felker became editor-in-chief and publisher of The Village Voice in 1974; he resigned from New York following its hostile takeover by Rupert Murdoch in 1976. He bought Esquire in 1977 but sold it in 1979. Felker in 1988 also bought the lower Manhattan paper Downtown Express, but sold it in 1991.

In 1976, Felker founded New West as New York's sister publication covering the West Coast. It featured writers such as Wolfe, Joan Didion and Joe Eszterhas. New West was purchased by Rupert Murdoch in 1977. In 1980, it was sold to Mediatex Communications Corp., which published Texas Monthly. Mediatex changed the name of the magazine to California in 1981. The magazine's circulation peaked at about 360,000 in 1987. By 1991, circulation had dropped to 250,000 and it was shut down.

In 1987, Felker became editor of the business magazine Manhattan, inc., staying on as editor when it was sold and merged with the lifestyle magazine M into M, inc. By 1990, Spy magazine portrayed Felker as out of touch with his former milieu and in charge of a series of money-losing journalistic enterprises.

In 1994, Felker became a lecturer at the Graduate School of Journalism at the University of California, Berkeley. He taught a course called "How to Make a Magazine" at the Felker Magazine Center, named in his honor and of which he became director. Felker's stylish but detached role as the founder and editor of New York magazine led some observers to compare him with another American mid-Westerner who went east—albeit a fictional one, Scott Fitzgerald's Jay Gatsby.

== Personal life ==
Felker was married three times:

- Leslie Blatt, a fellow Duke undergraduate, in 1949; they divorced, and she subsequently married John W. Aldridge, a literary critic, and later Charles Westoff, a Princeton University professor. She died November 9, 2014, in Palm Beach, Florida.
- Pamela Tiffin, an actress and fashion model, whom he married in 1962 and divorced in 1969. She died in 2020.
- Gail Sheehy, a writer, in 1984. By this marriage he had a daughter, Mohm Sheehy, whom Sheehy adopted from Cambodia, and a stepdaughter, Maura Sheehy Moss.

== Death ==
Felker died on July 1, 2008, in Manhattan from what his wife, Gail Sheehy, described as "natural causes", following a long battle with throat cancer.

== Tributes ==
Tom Wolfe said: "He ranks with Henry Luce of Time, Harold Ross of the New Yorker and Jann Wenner of Rolling Stone in that these are all people that brought out magazines that had a new take on life in America."

The former editor-in-chief of New York, Adam Moss, wrote after Felker's death: "American journalism would not be what it is today without Clay Felker. He created a kind of magazine that had never been seen before, told a kind of story that had never been told."
