= TeaOnHer =

Men-only mobile phone app

TeaOnHer is a male-oriented dating surveillance mobile app that allows men to anonymously rate and comment on women they are dating. It was set up in response to the existence of Tea, a female-oriented dating app that allowed women to rate and comment on men. In 2025, Cosmopolitian magazine described it as America's second most popular mobile app, with it being the second most popular app in the lifestyle section of Apple's App Store.

The TeaOnHer app has fewer features than the rival Tea app, focusing instead on anonymous commenting. It is listed as having been developed by a company called Newville Media Corporation.

TechCrunch reported in 2025 that TeaOnHer had leaked credentials of some of its users.
