= National Ugly Mugs =

UK charity opposing violence against sex workers

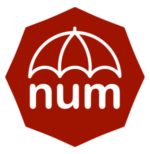
- Red umbrella logo of National Ugly Mugs
- Abbreviation: NUM
- Formation: 2008; 18 years ago
- Founded at: Manchester
- Type: Nonprofit
- Headquarters: Manchester, England
- Region served: United Kingdom
- CEO: Lynsey Walton
- Website: nationaluglymugs.org
- Formerly called: UK Network of Sex Work Projects

National Ugly Mugs (NUM) is a British charity best known for its "ugly mugs list" service that allows sex workers to share details of dangerous clients.

It was first established in 2008 as the UK Network of Sex Work Projects (UKNSWP), a charity based in Manchester that acted as an umbrella organisation representing sex work projects in the UK, both agencies or individuals working with sex workers. It facilitated networking between those it represents, so as to share good practice about providing quality support services for sex workers.

In July 2012 UKNSWP launched the National Ugly Mugs scheme, a national third party reporting system for sex workers that issues alerts to sex workers via their smartphone, and feeds intelligence to police, aiming to reduce offending by dangerous serial sexual offenders.

It was one of five winners of the Guardian Charity Awards 2014.

The charity was later renamed National Ugly Mugs, after the reporting system it founded.

== National Ugly Mugs reporting system ==
Its namesake service National Ugly Mugs is a third party reporting system for sex workers that issues alerts to sex workers via their smartphone, and feeds intelligence to police, aiming to reduce offending by dangerous serial sexual offenders.

The National Ugly Mugs pilot scheme was announced by the UK government in December 2011, with £108,000 provided by the Home Office "to establish a national online network to collate and distribute information between 'ugly mugs' schemes in local areas." Though funded by the Home Office, it was managed independently by UKNSWP. The initial pilot scheme went live in Manchester on 6 July 2012 and by 2016 was undergoing a larger pilot in London.

The National Ugly Mugs reporting system has continued to operate since then. In 2023, it logged 585 cases of violence. It provides tools for sex workers to be able to receive alerts, to check clients, to report violent or concerning incidents, and to remove unauthorized online content. In addition to the online services, NUM also employs caseworkers who can help sex workers. NUM provides access to their services via their website, email, and telephone.

== Other services ==
In addition to its National Ugly Mugs service, NUM runs a number of advocacy, education and support services. It also runs NUMbrella Lane (formerly Umbrella Lane) a centre for sex workers in Glasgow, and provides emergency food and toiletries assistance vouchers for sex workers.

NUM also publishes a peridical zine, Under The Red Umbrella, written by members of British and Irish sex workers' groups.

== See also ==
- Global Network of Sex Work Projects
- International Day to End Violence Against Sex Workers
- Manchester Action on Street Health
- Prostitution in the United Kingdom
