= Lulu (app) =

Mobile app that lets women rate men

Luluvise, Inc.
- Industry: Social networking service, mobile app
- Founder: Alexandra Chong
- Headquarters: New York City, United States
- Website: No longer available, formerly onlulu.com

Lulu (formerly Luluvise) was a web and mobile app for iOS and Android that allowed female users to make positive and negative evaluations of male users on the basis of their romantic, personal, and sexual appeal. The app allowed only female users to access the evaluation system, and evaluations made through the app are attached publicly and anonymously.

In 2015 the app moved away from Facebook, and currently only allows registration via mobile phone numbers, for both male and female users.

Lulu describes itself as "a private network for girls to express and share their opinions openly and honestly" about the weaknesses and strengths of the manners, appearances, spending habits, and career ambitions of their male acquaintances. The company's expansion of its user base focuses heavily on recruiting undergraduate members of American all-female sororities, which commentators describe as reflected in the "app's linguistic and visual design [which] is visibly influenced by US sorority culture."

The app has been highly controversial, and the functionalities offered by the app are frequently described negatively in the popular press as "sexist and objectifying", "nonconsensual", and "shallow and mean". Although female users cannot write their own comments to avoid bullying, the company's harshest critics hold that the pre-selected terms used within the app for evaluations in the form of hashtags are instrumental in "reinforcing completely horrible stereotypes", accuse the site of tolerating a sexist double standard, and liken the "candor" for which the app aims to a form of public harassment. The company's founder, Alexandra Chong, refers to the app's functionalities as "provocative" and "ground-breaking" and the website holds that the multiple-choice nature of evaluations creates "a safe and positive place for girls and guys".

The company has also been accused of inappropriate use of Facebook accounts' user data. Lulu does not query male Facebook users for their consent in integrating their profiles in the app, and at the time of its release the product caused notable social "recoil" and received significant negative coverage in the press for its violation of Facebook's policies on the use of user data. The company notes that its data collection policies are now in compliance with Facebook's Platform Policies. Also, it points out how users who have unwittingly been incorporated into Lulu's databases may contact their support center for the removal of their personal data.

Lulu was sold to Badoo in 2016 and discontinued some time later.

== History ==
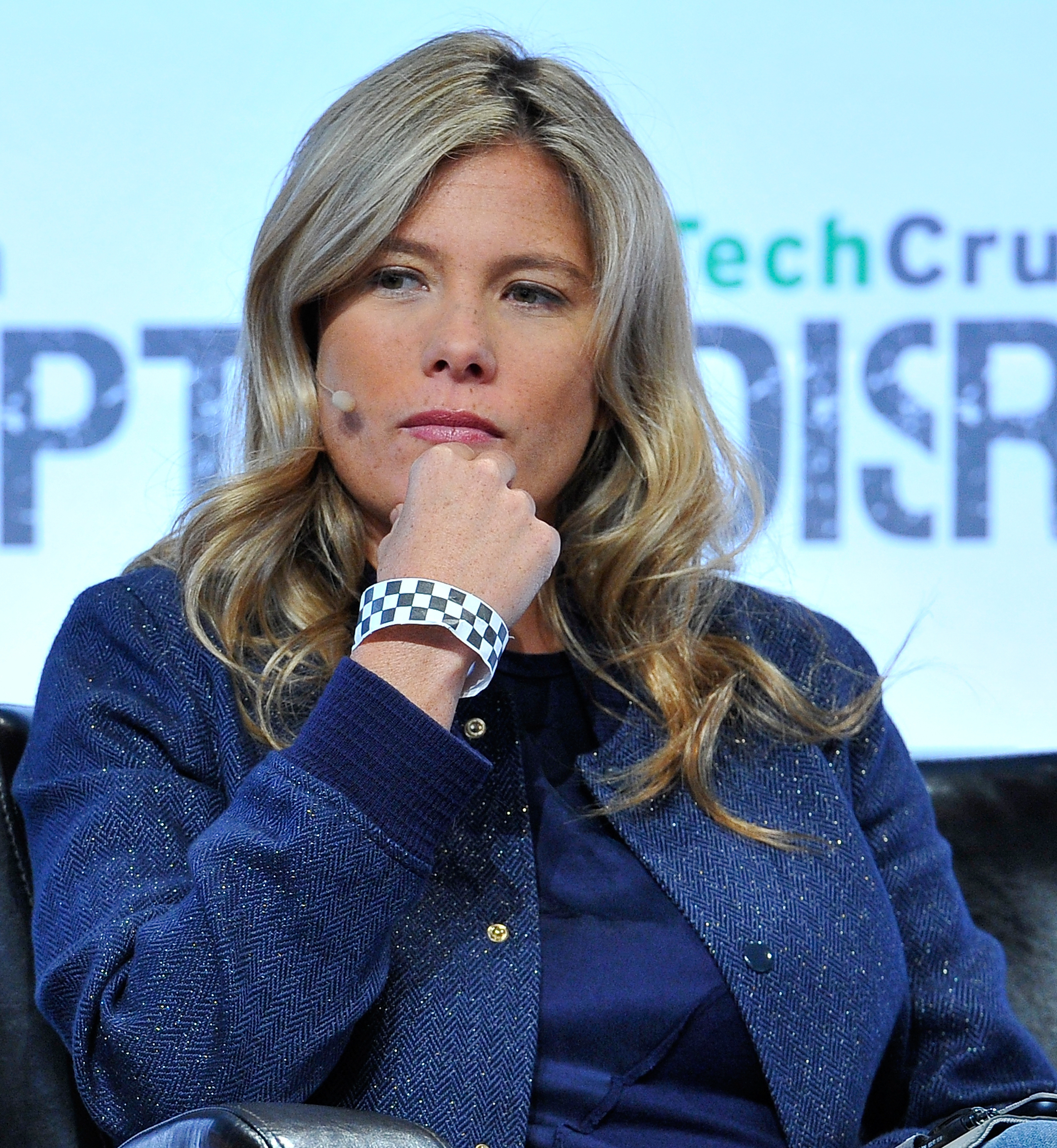
Alexandra Chong in 2015

Lulu was created by Alexandra Chong, a Chinese-Jamaican/Canadian from Ocho Rios and former Jamaican tennis Olympian who studied at Appalachian State University and received her LLB from the London School of Economics. She has stated as her inspiration a "really funny" Valentine's Day date she went on in 2009, after which she wanted to be able to discuss details with her female friends without sharing information on Facebook. In December 2011, after stints at Upstream and The Corporate Executive Board Company, she launched Luluvise.com, which was succeeded in January 2013 by Lulu, then as a private, invitation-only app for female users at Florida State University and the University of Florida. In February 2013 the app was released nationally in the US. By April 2013 the app had 200,000 men listed and rated. In November 2013, the app was covered by The New York Times, at which point the company claimed more than a million users. New York magazine reported in November 2013 that the average rating for male users on the app's 10-point numerical scale was 7.5 points.

== Current features ==
Female users answer multiple-choice questions about a man’s sense of humor, manners, ambition, commitment level, and look and style. Results are converted to a 0-to-10 rating, which constitutes a guy’s “score”. Unlike other review-based systems, they cannot add their own comments.

Male users on Lulu can add photos and hashtags to influence female users' opinion. They can edit any detail on their profiles, see their average score, how they perform across 7 categories, and which hashtags girls they know use to describe them. They can also acquire a subscription to see a more detailed breakdown of their scores.

Lulu has an online automatic self-removal tool that allows both male and female users to delete their account at their request and "blacklist" their mobile phone numbers. Their Support Center also mentions the inclusion of agree and disagree buttons let girls weigh in on the accuracy of each review.

In 2014 Truth Bombs was launched: an anonymous forum where users can anonymously share their doubts and opinions about relationships and sex.

In 2015 the Private Chat feature was added to the app as a main feature, allowing women “to make the first move”: female users can invite men they are interested in to a one-on-one conversation via their profiles or Truth Bombs.

== Acquisition by Badoo ==
In February 2016, Badoo acquired Lulu and removed the app's ability to rate men.

== Controversy ==
The stock phrases and "coy euphemisms" used within the app in the form of hashtags to evaluate users' male acquaintances have been noted by The Independent to evoke "stupid cookie-cutter men who can't feel or think and can be summarised in a few sassy phrases of cute girl-talk", highlighting concerns that the app violates the bounds of social propriety and could be used to debase the social standing of users of whom it contains evaluations.

Lulu states that it aims to "unleash the value of girl talk" to empower its female reviewers. Columnists dispute the app's stated aim to help "girls to make smarter decisions on topics [such as] relationships", arguing that the "Lisa Frank girly fun" of the app and its pre-selected review terms prevent the service from meaningfully addressing a substantive topic such as dating abuse or sexual assault. The Telegraph praised the app for “...making dating safer for women”.

Critical reactions such as in Forbes note the a sexist double standard regarding the app: "If Lulu existed for men to rate women," columnist Kelly Clay notes, "it's likely that Apple would probably reject it from the app store." The Daily Barometer likewise suggested that the app is degrading to both men and women, concurring that: "If there was a man’s version of Lulu, women would absolutely not stand for it." Slate described the app as "creepy" and noted that "[u]nwelcomed sexual commentary isn't a compliment, it's harassment." Forbes notes that Lulu "has enabled female millennials to think that digital revenge is acceptable ... and provided them a sleek platform to slander men."

In May 2013, a "Shut Down Lulu" petition was created on Change.org by a man named George Orlin. This petition gained over 700 supporters.

Lulu attracted attention after its release for how its initial collection of male Facebook users' data was at the time in violation of Facebook's Platform Policies. The public nature of the app's negative evaluations has also sparked concerns that the evaluations could potentially be libelous in nature. According to the libel laws of the United Kingdom, observers note that it "could well be construed by a judge in a court of law that [an evaluation on the app] has 'lowered [the male Facebook user] in the minds of right thinking members of society'". In response to such allegations, a Lulu representative responded at the time that they "have good legal counsel and guidelines in place" and "also have a takedown policy", and the site notes that its present data collection does not violate Facebook's Platform Policies. Lulu's terms and conditions likewise have referenced how "uploading or posting information about other individuals might encroach on the data protection rights of those individuals".

== See also ==
- DontDateHimGirl.com, a site frequently compared to Lulu which once had a similar (now-defunct) rating system for men
- Tea, a mobile app allowing women to rate men, extant as of 2025
- Online reputation management
