= Lindsay Peoples Wagner =

American journalist and editor

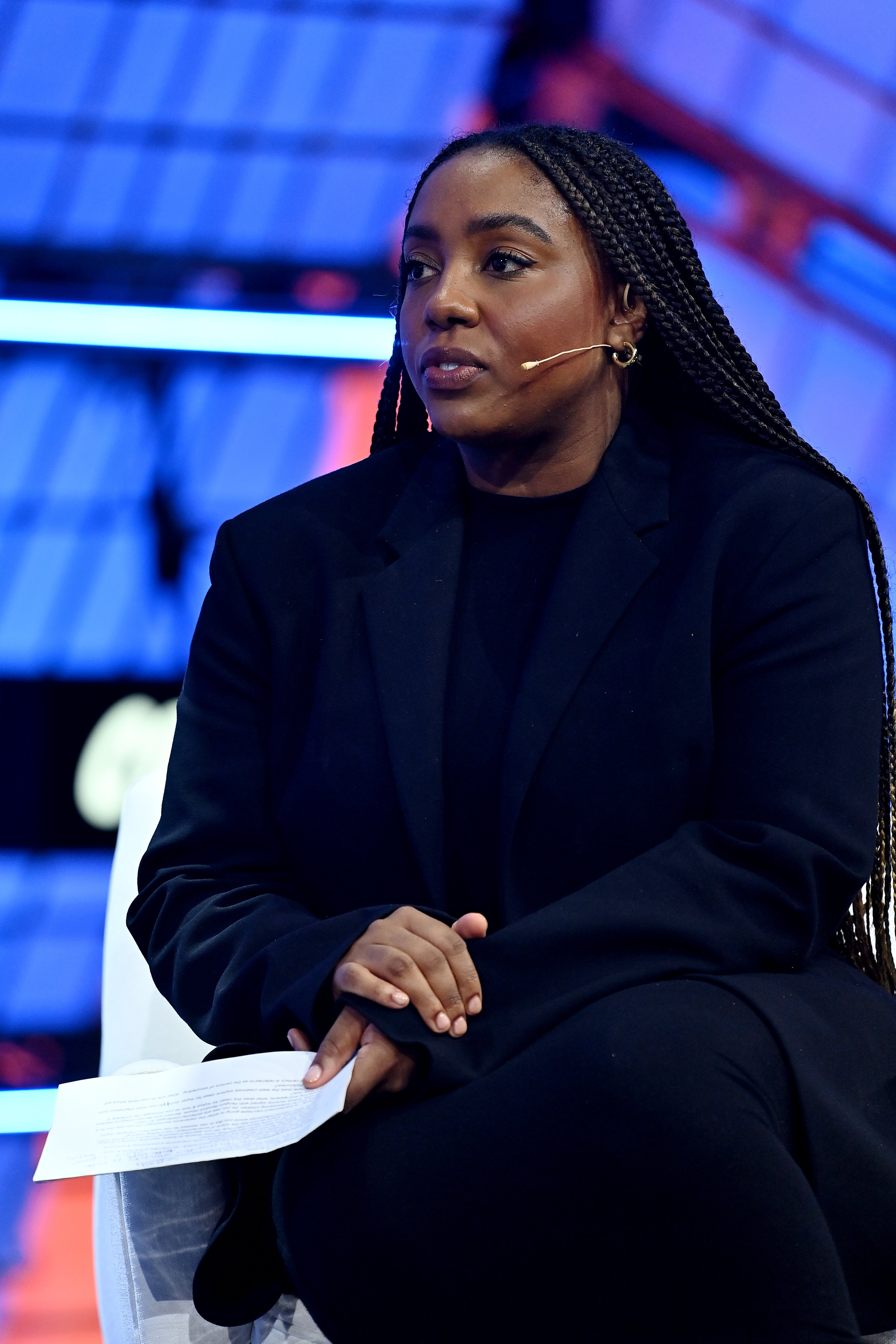
- Peoples Wagner in 2022
- Born: October 17, 1990 (age 35)
- Education: Buena Vista University
- Occupation: Editor-in-chief
- Employer: The Cut

Lindsay Peoples (born October 17, 1990) is an American editor serving as editor-in-chief of New York magazine's The Cut since 2021. She is the former editor-in-chief of Teen Vogue, and was the youngest editor-in-chief of any Condé Nast magazine.

== Life and career ==
Peoples was raised in Brown Deer, Wisconsin. After attending Buena Vista University in Iowa, she started an internship at Teen Vogue, then became a fashion assistant at the magazine.

She left Teen Vogue to work for Style.com, then joined The Cut, an online style and culture publication of New York, as a fashion editor. During her time at The Cut, she wrote a "celebrated" article on what it is like to be black in fashion, interviewing 100 people in the business. In October 2018, she became editor-in-chief of Teen Vogue, making her the youngest, as well as the third African-American, editor-in-chief of a Condé Nast publication.

In 2020 she founded the Black in Fashion Council with Sandrine Charles, an organization dedicated to holding the fashion industry accountable for change related to race and inclusion. The Black in Fashion Council garnered the support of approximately 400 Black models, stylists, executives, and editors and has 38 international partners.

In 2021, Peoples rejoined The Cut as its editor-in-chief, replacing Stella Bugbee. Before the role, she had advised New York editor in chief David Haskell on diversity and inclusion efforts.

== Honors and awards ==
- 2017 – ASME, Next Award
- 2020 – Forbes 30 Under 30 (Media)
