= Whispering campaign =

Method of persuasion

A whispering campaign or whisper campaign is a method of persuasion in which damaging rumors or innuendo are spread about the target, often in an attempt to create a scandal or other desired outcome, while the source of the rumors seeks to avoid being detected while they are spread. For example, a political campaign might distribute anonymous flyers attacking the other candidate. The tactic is generally considered unethical in open societies, particularly in matters of public policy. The speed and the anonymity of communication made possible by modern technologies like the Internet have increased public awareness of whisper campaigns and their ability to succeed. The phenomenon has also led to the failure of whisper campaigns, as those seeking to prevent them can publicize their existence much more readily than in the past. Whisper campaigns are defended in some circles as an efficient mechanism for underdogs who lack other resources to disclose wrongdoings of the powerful without repercussions.

== Marketing ==
Other tactics include "buying" drinks and giving away cigarettes to patrons without making known that the benefactor is a representative of the company. More recently, companies are also paying bloggers to mention products or causes. As a form of astroturfing, companies hire employees to post comments on blogs, forums, online encyclopedias such as (on Wikipedia), etc. to steer online conversations in their desired direction.

== Politics ==
Whisper campaigns in the United States began with the conflict between John Adams and Thomas Jefferson as both were vying for the 1800 presidential election. The Federalists, which supported Adams, accused Jefferson of having robbed a widow and her children of a trust fund and of having fathered numerous mulatto children by his own slave women.

Whisper campaigns are frequently used in electoral politics as a method of shaping the discussion without being seen to do so. US President Grover Cleveland was the target of a whisper campaign in 1884, when Republicans claimed that he had fathered an illegitimate child while he was still Governor of New York. US President Franklin D. Roosevelt was frequently a topic of whisper campaigns resulting from his support of the New Deal and his poor health.

During the 2000 Republican presidential primary, Senator John McCain, whose adopted daughter is a dark-skinned child from Bangladesh, was the target of a whisper campaign, which implied that he had fathered a black child out of wedlock. Voters in South Carolina were reportedly asked in a push poll, "Would you be more likely or less likely to vote for John McCain if you knew that he fathered an illegitimate black child?". In addition, on the week of the nomination vote, dozens of radio stations were inundated with calls on this topic, and talk show hosts were asked what they thought of McCain's fathering of a black child out of wedlock.

In 2018, when the question of what the United States should do about the disappearance of Jamal Khashoggi was an open question, a whispering campaign was mounted that attacked the character of Khashoggi.

== See also ==
- Black propaganda
- Call-out culture
- Chinese whispers
- Defamation
- Fraser Committee
- Fear, uncertainty, and doubt
- Gang stalking
- Smear campaign
- Swiftboating
- Whisper network
