= Bad date list =

Service that circulates details of persons that may pose a threat to sex workers

A bad date list (also known as a bad date book, bad trick sheet or ugly mugs list) circulates details of persons that may pose a threat to sex workers. Bad date lists can serve as a warning system, so that sex workers can avoid persons who fit descriptions on the list. Bad date lists contain reports of 'bad dates' or incidents of violent or dangerous clients or other persons, which describe the incident, and frequently provide a description of the person, their vehicle, and their phone number (as applicable).

A "bad trick sheet" system was operating in Vancouver, Canada as long ago as 1990, using a computer to maintain a database of entries.

Bad date lists can be handed out to outdoor sex workers, with Crossroads in Alberta, Canada having been recorded doing this in 2003. In 2014, the British National Ugly Mugs system was set up as an online service. An online system has been proposed for the whole of British Columbia in Canada.

Many organizations produce a "bad date list" including:

- Sex Professionals of Canada
- COYOTE (in New York, NY)
- WISH (in Vancouver, BC)
- Crossroads (Alberta, Canada)
- The Bad Date Coalition of Toronto
- Project SAFE (Philadelphia, PA)
- SWAN Vancouver (Vancouver, Canada)
- National Ugly Mugs (UK)
- Ugly Mugs Ireland

== See also ==
- Defamation
- Security of person
- Whisper network
