= DontDateHimGirl.com =

Website about cheating partners

- Website type: Dating advice
- Available in: English
- Creator: Tasha Cunningham a.k.a. Tasha Joseph
- Website: dontdatehimgirl.com
- Commercial: Yes
- Registration: Optional
- Launched: July 2005 (21 years ago)
- Current status: Offline

DontDateHimGirl.com was a website with dating advice and tips. It was launched in July 2005. It originally hosted anonymously submitted relationship stories about cheating partners. In 2010, the website said it was removing the "database of alleged cads".

In an article in The New York Times, the site's founder Tasha Cunningham (also known as Tasha Joseph) likened it to a "dating credit report" for women.

== History ==
DontDateHimGirl.com was founded in 2005 by Tasha Joseph. Members were able to post anonymous reviews and photographs of cheating men to the site. When asked about the accuracy of reviews, Joseph said that the website terms and conditions required posted content to be true, and said that men could also join the website to respond to messages.

In July 2010, the site issued a press release that it would be removing the "database of alleged cads" to refocus on "putting out quality content such as articles, videos and podcasts that help women learn to date better, forming content partnerships and creating engaging mobile platforms". As of July 2011, much of the database was still available to be accessed, but as of February 2016 the database has been removed.

== Controversies ==
The site has received criticism as a "reputation management system" which provides a venue for anonymously posting false, malicious or fraudulent profiles of men without an adequate means to correct them.

In 2006, Todd Hollis, a Pennsylvania attorney, filed a suit against the website owner as well as two alleged posters and five unidentified women for various claims posted about him which he asserted were false and defamatory. The lawsuit was initially dismissed in Pennsylvania for a lack of personal jurisdiction. In 2007, Hollis filed a second lawsuit in federal court in Florida which was settled after the federal judge refused to dismiss the new case. The terms of the settlement were not disclosed.

A September 2006 article in the Miami New Times elaborated on a fabricated profile created to demonstrate that the "website is dangerous". The New Times investigated a number of profiles and found claims made were on the whole, fallacious. One profile the New Times uncovered supposedly of a philandering ex-boyfriend was actually a gay man who had spurned a woman's advances.

In an August 2007 feature, ABC News referred to DontDateHimGirl as a "revenge site". On the same day, The O'Reilly Factor referenced DontDateHimGirl as a "hate site".

While it was announced in July 2010 that the profiles of the men on the site would be removed, as of June 2011, the database could still be accessed through the site's "posts" directory which are linked extensively on other websites. However, on an unknown date consequent to this, the database was removed as promised and as of February 2016 is not accessible.

== See also ==
- Are We Dating The Same Guy?
- Lulu – a mobile app with a similar rating system in place for men
