= The Cut (publication) =

Online publication in New York magazine

- Editor-in-chief: Lindsay Peoples Wagner
- Founded: 2008
- Company: Vox Media
- Based in: New York City
- Website: thecut.com

The Cut is an online publication that, as part of New York magazine, covers a wide range of topics, such as work, money, sex and relationships, fashion, mental health, pop culture, politics, and parenting, with a specific lens for women.

== History ==
Launched in 2008 as a fashion blog, The Cut became a stand-alone vertical in 2012 and shifted its focus from fashion to a broader range of topics. Stella Bugbee, who launched the site as editorial director in August 2012, became editor-in-chief in 2017, the same year the site unveiled a mobile-first redesign and new site sections: Style, Self, Culture, and Power.

In 2018, The Cut launched a T-shirt shop at Amazon. The Cut expanded into e-commerce with the Cut Shop, a digital boutique giving readers shopping recommendations spanning fashion, beauty, wellness, and home products.

Since 2018, The Cut has had Spring Fashion and Fall Fashion print issues that run on the flip side of New York Magazine's own biweekly edition.

In 2019, The Cut's then-parent company, New York Media, merged with Vox Media.

In 2021, Lindsay Peoples became the publication's second editor-in-chief. Under Peoples, the site's mission is "to be the thing you share in your group chats, because we want to be that community. We're not trying to preach or be judgmental; we just want to have a conversation." To meet advertising and subscriber demand, The Cut expanded its editorial team in 2024 to continue to grow its coverage and readership. Cover stars for The Cut under Peoples's leadership have included Naomi Campbell, Simone Biles, and the women of Euphoria.

== Content ==
=== Notable publications ===
In 2015, The Cut published a New York Magazine cover feature by Noreen Malone that included interviews with 35 women who had accused Bill Cosby of sexual assault. The cover image and photo portfolio by Amanda Demme included portraits of all the women seated and an empty chair to symbolize those unable to come forward.

In 2018, The Cut published an essay by Moira Donegan in which she revealed herself as the creator of the "Shitty Media Men" list that contained rumors and allegations of sexual misconduct by men in the magazine world. Later that year, Lindsay Peoples's essay "Everywhere and Nowhere", about the challenges of being a Black voice in the fashion industry, came out, sending a "ripple of waves through the industry."

An excerpt from E. Jean Carroll's book What Do We Need Men For? A Modest Proposal ran in 2019 on The Cut and on the cover of New York's print magazine, in which she first shared her story of being sexually assaulted by then-President Donald Trump.

In 2022, The Cut ran a special package that highlighted resources for accessing an abortion nationwide following the Supreme Court's overturning of Roe v. Wade.

The Cut is known for a number of columns, including Tefi Pessoa's advice column "Ask Tefi", Madame Clairevoyant's weekly horoscopes; as-told-tos in "Sex Diaries"; and the "How I Get It Done" series, highlighting the routines of influential women. The Cut has published widely read personal essays including Emily Gould on the "Lure of Divorce", Grazie Sophia Christie on "The Case for Marrying an Older Man", and Charlotte Cowles's "The Day I Put $50,000 in a Shoe Box and Handed It to a Stranger".

In 2023, Esther Perel's Where Should We Begin? podcast joined New York.

=== Film and television adaptations ===
The 2015 story "The Hustlers at Scores" was released as the 2019 blockbuster Hustlers. The May 2018 story "Maybe She Had So Much Money She Just Lost Track of It" chronicled Anna Delvey's rise and became the basis of the Netflix limited series Inventing Anna. In November 2018, The Cut published "The Watcher", which was later adapted into a Netflix limited series of the same name, created by Ryan Murphy. The Cut's "Sex Diaries" column, which started in 2007 and asks anonymous city dwellers to record a week in their sex lives, was the basis of Sex Diaries, a 2022 docuseries on HBO.

== Awards ==
In 2015, the New York Magazine cover story on Bill Cosby's accusers, which ran on The Cut, won the George Polk Award for Magazine Reporting. In 2017, Lindsay Peoples won an ASME Next Award for her work as an editor at The Cut. In 2018, The Cut was named Website of the Year on Adweek's "Publishing Hot List" and was part of New York's submission for its 2018 National Magazine Award win for Best Website. The Cut and New York writer-at-large Rebecca Traister also won the National Magazine Award for Columns and Commentary that year. The Cut on Tuesdays, its first podcast, won the 2020 Gracie Award for Best Podcast (Lifestyle), and in 2022, Peoples was honored with the Pratt Fashion Visionary Award. In 2023, Peoples and writer Morgan Jerkins accepted the National Magazine Award for Single-Topic Issue for the package "Ten Years After Trayvon Martin". In 2026, The Cut and New York features writer Bridget Read were National Magazine Award finalists in lifestyle journalism for “The Forever-35 Face.”
