= New York (magazine) =

American lifestyle and politics magazine

- April 8, 1968 issue
- Editor: David Haskell
- Categories: General interest
- Frequency: Biweekly
- Publisher: New York Media
- Total circulation: 439,135
- First issue: April 8, 1968; 58 years ago
- Company: Lupa Systems
- Country: United States
- Based in: New York City
- Language: English
- Website: nymag.com
- ISSN: 0028-7369
- OCLC: 1760010

New York is an American biweekly magazine. Founded by Clay Felker and Milton Glaser in 1968 as a competitor to The New Yorker and The New York Times Magazine, it was brasher in voice and more connected to city life, becoming a cradle of New Journalism and one of the first lifestyle magazines. Over time it expanded into national coverage, noted for its political reporting, arts and culture criticism, food writing, and service journalism. Since its redesign and relaunch in 2004, it has won numerous National Magazine Awards, including Magazine of the Year in 2013. Its critics have twice won the Pulitzer Prize for Criticism, with Jerry Saltz in 2018 and Andrea Long Chu in 2023. The magazine also diversified its online presence under the nymag.com umbrella, launching Vulture, The Cut, Intelligencer, The Strategist, Curbed, and Grub Street. Vox Media acquired the magazine in 2019 and sold it to James Murdoch's Lupa Systems in 2026.

== History ==
=== 1960s ===
New York was created in 1963 as the Sunday-magazine supplement of the New York Herald Tribune newspaper. The Herald Tribune, then in financial difficulty, had recently been sold to John Hay Whitney, and was looking to revitalize its business with an increased focus on editorial excellence, which included a relaunch of the Sunday edition and its magazine. Edited first by Sheldon Zalaznick and then by Clay Felker, the relaunched magazine, called New York, showcased the work of many talented Tribune contributors, including Tom Wolfe, Barbara Goldsmith, Gail Sheehy, Dick Schaap, and Jimmy Breslin. The Tribune went out of business in 1966, and New York was briefly revived as part of a combined paper, the World Journal Tribune, that lasted until May 1967. Shortly after the WJT closed, Felker and his partner, Milton Glaser, purchased the rights to the nameplate, backed by Wall Street bankers led by Armand G. Erpf (the magazine's first chairman, who Felker attributed as the financial architect of the magazine) and C. Gerald Goldsmith (Barbara Goldsmith's husband at the time), and reincarnated the magazine as a stand-alone glossy weekly. Joining them was managing editor Jack Nessel, Felker's number-two at the Herald Tribune. New York's first issue was dated April 8, 1968. Several writers came from the magazine's earlier incarnation, including Breslin, Wolfe (who wrote "You and Your Big Mouth: How the Honks and Wonks Reveal the Phonetic Truth about Status" in the inaugural issue), and George Goodman, a financial writer who wrote under the pseudonym "Adam Smith". Glaser and his deputy Walter Bernard designed and laid out the magazine and hired many notable artists, including Jim McMullan, Robert Grossman, and David Levine, to produce covers and illustrations.

Within a year, Felker had assembled a team of contributors who would come to define the magazine's voice. Breslin became a regular, as did Nicholas Pileggi, Gail Sheehy, and Gloria Steinem, who wrote a politics column. Judith Crist wrote movie reviews. Harold Clurman was hired as the theater critic, then replaced a few months later by John Simon, who became notorious for his harsh reviews. Alan Rich covered the classical-music scene. Barbara Goldsmith wrote a series called "The Creative Environment", in which she interviewed such subjects as Marcel Breuer, I. M. Pei, George Balanchine, and Pablo Picasso about their process. Gael Greene, writing under the rubric "The Insatiable Critic", reviewed restaurants, cultivating a baroque writing style that leaned heavily on sexual metaphor. The office for the magazine was on the top floor of the old Tammany Hall clubhouse at 207 East 32nd Street, which Glaser owned. The magazine did not consistently turn a profit in these early years: One board member, Alan Patricof, later said that "it may have touched into the black for a quarter, then out of it, but it was not significantly profitable."

=== 1970s ===
Wolfe, a regular contributor to the magazine, wrote a story in 1970 that captured the spirit of the magazine (if not the age): "Radical Chic: That Party at Lenny's". The controversial and often criticized article described a benefit party for the Black Panthers, held in Leonard Bernstein's apartment, in a collision of high culture and low that paralleled New York magazine's ethos and expressed Wolfe's interest in status and class.

In 1972, New York's year-end issue incorporated a 30-page preview of the first issue of Ms. magazine, edited by Gloria Steinem. Gail Sheehy's "The Search for Grey Gardens", a cover story about the notorious mother-and-daughter Beale household of East Hampton, led to the Maysles brothers' acclaimed documentary.

As the 1970s progressed, Felker continued to broaden the magazine's editorial vision beyond Manhattan, covering Richard Nixon and the Watergate scandal closely. He also launched New West, a sister magazine on New York's model that covered California life, published in separate Northern California and Southern California editions. In 1976, journalist Nik Cohn wrote a story called "Tribal Rites of the New Saturday Night", about a young man in a working-class Brooklyn neighborhood who, once a week, went to a local disco called Odyssey 2001; the story was a sensation and served as the basis for the film Saturday Night Fever. Twenty years later, in a followup story in New York, Cohn admitted that he had made up the character and most of the story.

In 1976, the Australian media baron Rupert Murdoch bought the magazine in a hostile takeover, forcing Felker and Glaser out. A succession of top editors followed through the remainder of the decade, including James Brady, Joe Armstrong (who also served as publisher), John Berendt, and (briefly) Jane Amsterdam.

=== 1980s ===
In 1980, Murdoch hired Edward Kosner, the former editor of Newsweek, to replace Armstrong. Murdoch also bought Cue, a listings magazine founded by Mort Glankoff that had covered the city since 1932, and folded it into New York, simultaneously creating a useful going-out guide and eliminating a competitor. Kosner's magazine shifted the mix of the magazine toward newsmagazine-style cover stories, trend pieces, and pure "service" features—long articles on shopping and other consumer subjects—as well as close coverage of the glitzy 1980s New York City scene epitomized by financiers Donald Trump and Saul Steinberg. The magazine was profitable for most of the 1980s. The term "the Brat Pack" was coined for a 1985 cover story in the magazine.

=== 1990s ===
Murdoch got out of the magazine business in 1991 by selling his holdings to K-III Communications (now Rent Group), a partnership controlled by financier Henry Kravis. Subsequent budget pressure from K-III frustrated Kosner, and he left in 1993, taking over the editorship of Esquire magazine. After several months during which the magazine was run by managing editor Peter Herbst, K-III hired Kurt Andersen, the co-creator of Spy, a humor monthly of the late 1980s and early 1990s. Andersen quickly replaced several staff members, bringing in emerging and established writers (including Jim Cramer, Walter Kirn, Michael Tomasky, and Jacob Weisberg) and editors (including Michael Hirschorn, Kim France, Dany Levy, and Maer Roshan), and generally making the magazine faster-paced, younger in outlook, and more knowing in tone. In August 1996, Bill Reilly fired Andersen from his editorship, citing the publication's financial results. According to Andersen, he was fired for refusing to kill a story about a rivalry between investment bankers Felix Rohatyn and Steven Rattner that had upset Henry Kravis, a member of the firm's ownership group. His replacement was Caroline Miller, who came from Seventeen, another K-III title. In part owing to the company's financial constraints, Miller and her editors focused on cultivating younger writers, including Ariel Levy, Jennifer Senior, Robert Kolker, and Vanessa Grigoriadis. She also hired Michael Wolff, whose writing about media and politics became an extremely popular component of the magazine.

=== 2000s ===
The magazine's first website, under the url nymetro.com, appeared in 2001. In 2002 and 2003, Wolff, the media critic Miller had hired in 1998, won two National Magazine Awards for his columns. At the end of 2003, New York was sold again, to a family trust controlled by financier Bruce Wasserstein, for $55 million. Wasserstein, early in 2004, replaced Miller with Adam Moss, who had founded the short-lived New York weekly 7 Days and then edited The New York Times Magazine. That fall, Moss and his staff relaunched the magazine, most notably with two new sections: "The Strategist", devoted mostly to service, food, and shopping, and "The Culture Pages", covering the city's arts scene. Moss also rehired Kurt Andersen as a columnist. In early 2006, the company relaunched the magazine's website, previously nymetro.com, as nymag.com.

New York in this period won design awards at the National Magazine Awards and was named Magazine of the Year by the Society of Publication Designers (SPD) in 2006 and 2007. A 2008 cover about Eliot Spitzer's prostitution scandal, created by the artist Barbara Kruger and displaying the word "Brain" with an arrow pointed at Spitzer's crotch, was named Cover of the Year by the American Society of Magazine Editors (ASME) and Advertising Age. The next year, another cover, "Bernie Madoff, Monster", was named Best News & Business Cover by ASME. New York won back-to-back ASME Cover of the Year awards in 2012 and 2013, for "Is She Just Too Old for This?" and "The City and the Storm" respectively. Design director Chris Dixon and photography director Jody Quon were named "Design Team of the Year" by Adweek in 2008.

When Bruce Wasserstein died in 2009, David Carr of The New York Times wrote that "While previous owners had required constant features in the magazine about the best place to get a croissant or a beret, it was clear that Wasserstein wanted a publication that was the best place to learn about the complicated apparatus that is modern New York. In enabling as much, Mr. Wasserstein recaptured the original intent of the magazine's founder, Clay Felker." Wasserstein's children retained control of the magazine, which continued to be overseen by his deputy Anup Bagaria.

In 2006, New York's website, NYMag.com, underwent a year-long relaunch, transforming from a site that principally republished the magazine's content to an up-to-the-minute news- and- service destination. John Heilemann's reporting on the 2008 presidential election led to the best-selling book Game Change, co-authored with Mark Halperin. In 2008, the magazine's parent company New York Media also purchased the restaurant- and-menu site MenuPages as a complement to its own restaurant coverage, reselling it in 2011 to Seamless.

With the launch of Grub Street, devoted to food, and Daily Intelligencer (later renamed just "Intelligencer"), its politics site, both in 2006; Vulture, its culture site, in 2007; and The Cut, its fashion-and-women's-interest site, in 2008, New York began shifting significant resources toward digital-only publication. These sites were intended to adapt the urbane sensibility of the print magazine for a national and international audience, and attract readership that had been lost by print magazines in general, particularly fashion and entertainment outlets. In 2009, the Washington Post media critic Howard Kurtz wrote that "the nation's best and most-imitated city magazine is often not about the city—at least not in the overcrowded, traffic-clogged, five-boroughs sense," observing that it was more regularly publishing political and cultural stories of national and international import. By July 2010, digital ads accounted for one-third of the company's advertising revenue. David Carr noted in an August 2010 column, "In a way, New York magazine is fast becoming a digital enterprise with a magazine attached."

=== 2010s ===
On March 1, 2011, it was announced that Frank Rich would leave The New York Times to become an essayist and editor-at-large for New York.

New York's "Encyclopedia of 9/11", published on the tenth anniversary of the attacks, was described by Gizmodo as "heartbreaking, locked in the past, and entirely current"; the issue won a National Magazine Award for Single-Topic Issue.

In October 2012, New York's offices in lower Manhattan were without electricity in the week following Hurricane Sandy, so the editorial staff published an issue from a quickly constructed temporary newsroom in the midtown office of Wasserstein & Company. The issue's cover, shot by photographer Iwan Baan from a helicopter and showing Manhattan half in darkness, almost immediately became an iconic image of the storm; Time called it the magazine cover of the year. The image was republished as a poster by the Museum of Modern Art, with proceeds benefiting Hurricane Sandy relief efforts. The following spring, New York took the top honor at the National Magazine Awards, again receiving the Magazine of the Year award for its print and digital coverage.

In December 2013, as readership for its digital sites continued to build, the magazine announced plans to shift the print edition to biweekly publication the following March, reducing from 42 issues per year to 26 plus three special editions.

In April 2016, the magazine announced the launch of Select All, a new vertical dedicated to technology and innovation. In 2019, Select All was shuttered and folded into the broadened "Intelligencer" news site.

In the mid-2010s, New York launched several podcasts jointly produced with other outlets, all short-lived. Its first independently owned podcast, Good One: A Podcast About Jokes, hosted by Jesse David Fox, launched in February 2017. The magazine also expanded into television, collaborating with Michael Hirschorn's Ish Entertainment and Bravo to produce a pilot for a weekly. TV show based on its popular back-page feature, the Approval Matrix. New York's art critic Jerry Saltz appeared as a judge on Bravo's reality competition series Work of Art: The Next Great Artist in 2010 and 2011. Grub Street senior editor Alan Sytsma appeared as a guest on judge on three episodes of the third season of Top Chef Masters.

April 2018 was New York's 50th anniversary, marked with a book-length history of the magazine and its city, published by Simon & Schuster and titled Highbrow, Lowbrow, Brilliant, Despicable: 50 Years of New York. The magazine also produced a commemorative issue and celebrated with a party at Katz's Delicatessen. That year, The Cut introduced its podcast, "The Cut on Tuesdays", produced jointly with Gimlet Media and hosted by one of the site's writers, Molly Fischer.

In December 2018, New York's fashion and beauty destination site, The Cut, carried a piece titled "Is Priyanka Chopra and Nick Jonas's Love for Real?", that drew severe backlash from readers for accusing Chopra of trapping Jonas into a fraudulent relationship and calling her a "global scam artist". The publication removed the piece the following morning and issued an apology.

In January 2019, Moss announced that he was retiring from the editorship. David Haskell, one of his chief deputies, succeeded him as editor on April 1, 2019. That spring, the magazine laid off several staff members and temporary employees.

In his first few months in the role, Haskell published a cover story on a bizarre cult at Sarah Lawrence college that ultimately led to its leader Larry Ray's conviction on federal charges of extortion, sex trafficking, and racketeering conspiracy. The magazine also published an excerpt from E. Jean Carroll's book that accused then-president Donald Trump of sexual assault and would have ongoing legal ramifications for him.

On September 24, 2019, Vox Media announced that it had purchased the magazine's parent company, New York Media LLC. Pam Wasserstein, the CEO of New York Media, became Vox Media's president, working closely with its CEO, Jim Bankoff.

=== 2020s ===
After the merger with Vox Media, May 2020, Vox Media announced it was merging the real estate site Curbed into New York and refocusing the site on its roots in New York City. That year, New York also expanded its podcast business, adding Pivot, On With Kara Swisher, Where Should We Begin with Esther Perel, Switched on Pop, and Into It With Sam Sanders to its lineup. The company also saw an expansion of its intellectual property into television and movies, notably with Hustlers, a feature film adapted from a story by Jessica Pressler. In 2022, three television series adapted from New York properties appeared: Inventing Anna and The Watcher on Netflix, and Sex Diaries on HBO. The magazine also moved into publishing an array of digital newsletters, including "Are U Coming?", which documented the nightlife of city emerging from Covid lockdown; "The Year I Ate New York", written in 2022 by Tammie Taclamarian and in 2023 by E. Alex Jung; and a collection of limited-series newsletters devoted to Succession, …And Just Like That, and prominent New York City court cases.

Notable stories published by New York in this decade include Nicholson Baker's investigation of the possibility that a lab leak instigated the COVID-19 epidemic; a cover package, "Ten Years Since Trayvon," about the rise of the Black Lives Matter movement; "The Year of the Nepo Baby," a widely discussed feature about dynastic career advancement in Hollywood, that popularized the term and won a National Magazine Award; and "There Is No Safe Word," an in-depth look at sexual-assault allegations against Neil Gaiman, after which he was dropped by his publisher. Lindsay Peoples became the editor of The Cut in 2021, and New York hired book critic Andrea Long Chu, who subsequently won the Pulitzer Prize for Criticism.

In 2026, James Murdoch's Lupa Systems media and tech holding company acquired New York Magazine, the Vox Media Podcast Network and Vox.com, reportedly for over $300 million. Other Vox Media properties — Eater, Popsugar, SB Nation, The Dodo and The Verge — are not included in the transaction.

== Puzzles and competitions ==
New York magazine has long run literary competitions and distinctive crossword puzzles. For the first year of the magazine's existence, the composer and lyricist Stephen Sondheim contributed an extremely complex cryptic crossword to every third issue. Sondheim eventually ceded the job in order to write his next musical, and Richard Maltby, Jr. took over. For many years the magazine also syndicated The Times of London's cryptic crossword.

Beginning in early 1969, for two weeks out of every three, Sondheim's friend Mary Ann Madden edited an extremely popular witty literary competition calling for readers to send in humorous poetry or other bits of wordplay on a given theme that changed with each installment. (A typical entry, in a competition calling for humorous epitaphs, supplied this one for Geronimo: "Requiescat in Apache.") Altogether, Madden ran 973 installments of the competition, retiring in 2000. Hundreds, sometimes thousands, of entries were received each week, and winners included David Mamet, Herb Sargent, and Dan Greenburg. David Halberstam once claimed that he had submitted entries 137 times without winning. Madden published three volumes of Competition winners, titled Thank You for the Giant Sea Tortoise, Son of Giant Sea Tortoise, and Maybe He's Dead: And Other Hilarious Results of New York Magazine Competitions.

Beginning in 1980, the magazine ran an American-style crossword constructed by Maura B. Jacobson. Jacobson retired in April 2011, having created 1,400 puzzles for the magazine, after which the job passed to Cathy Allis Millhauser and then Matt Gaffney. In January 2020, Vulture began publishing daily 10x10 crosswords by two constructors, Malaika Handa and Stella Zawistowski. Vulture continued its expansion into games with the launch of Cinematrix, an addictive movie trivia game, in 2024, followed by Telematrix in 2025.

== Websites ==
=== Intelligencer ===
New York's news blog was introduced under the name Daily Intelligencer, expanding upon the weekly magazine's front-of-the-book Intelligencer section. Launched in 2006, it was initially written mostly by Jessica Pressler and Chris Rovzar, whose coverage focused on local politics, media, and Wall Street but also included extensive chatter about the television show Gossip Girl. Over its first half-decade, the site expanded in reach and became more focused on national politics, notably with the addition of columnist Jonathan Chait in 2011 and the longtime political blogger Ed Kilgore in 2015.

=== The Cut ===
The Cut launched on the New York website in 2008, edited by Amy Odell, to replace a previous fashion week blog, Show & Talk. In 2012 it became a standalone website, shifting focus from fashion to women's issues more generally. Stella Bugbee became editor-in-chief in 2017, and presided over a relaunch that appeared on August 21. The new site was designed for an enhanced mobile-first experience and to better reflect the topics covered. In January 2018, The Cut published Moira Donegan's essay revealing her as the creator of the controversial "Shitty Media Men" list, a viral but short-lived anonymous spreadsheet crowdsourcing unconfirmed reports of sexual misconduct by men in journalism. That August, the site also published "Everywhere and Nowhere," Lindsay Peoples's essay about the fashion industry's inhospitability to Black voices and points of view. In 2019, The Cut published an excerpt from E. Jean Carroll's book, What Do We Need Men For? A Modest Proposal, mostly about Donald Trump's sexual assault on her. In 2021, Peoples became the site's next editor-in-chief. The Cut also incorporates the pop-science rubric Science of Us, which previously existed as a standalone site.

=== Grub Street ===
Grub Street, covering food and restaurants, was expanded in 2009 to five additional cities served by former nymag.com sister site MenuPages.com. In 2013 Grub Street announced that it would close its city blogs outside New York and bring a more national focus to GrubStreet.com.

=== Vulture ===
Vulture was launched as a pop culture blog on NYMag.com in 2007. It moved to an independent web address, Vulture.com, in 2012. In 2018, New York Media acquired the comedy news blog Splitsider, folding the operation into the Vulture website.

=== The Strategist ===
In 2016, New York launched the Strategist, an expansion of a column from the print version of New York Magazine that aimed to help readers navigate shopping from the New York perspective. The site joined other product review sites focusing on providing free product reviews to readers, generating affiliate commissions when readers would purchase a product they recommended. The early editorial team included editors David Haskell and Alexis Swerdloff. Popular recurring franchises include the celebrity-shopping "What I Can't Live Without" series, "Strategist-Approved" gift guides, and beauty reviews by influencer Rio Viera-Newton. The Strategist does not publish branded content that is paid for by the subject of a story, but it earns revenue through affiliate advertising, including the Amazon Associates Program. In 2018, the Strategist experimented with a holiday pop-up shop called I Found It at the Strategist.

=== Curbed ===
In 2020, New York took over the Vox Media website Curbed, which had begun by covering New York City real estate and development since 2005 and had grown to cover urbanism and design news in many American cities. That October, Curbed relaunched as a New York vertical with a new design and a resharpened focus on New York City. Its prominent writers include the Pulitzer Prize–winner Justin Davidson, the magazine's architecture critic, and Wendy Goodman, its design editor.

== Books ==
Books published by New York include:

- The Underground Gourmet, by Milton Glaser and Jerome Snyder (Simon & Schuster, 1970)
- Best Bets, by Ellen Stern (Quick Fox Books, 1976)
- September 11, 2001: A Record of Tragedy, Heroism, and Hope (Abrams, 2001)
- New York Cooks: The 100 Best Recipes From New York Magazine, by Gillian Duffy (Abrams, 2003)
- New York Look Book: A Gallery of Street Fashion (Melcher Media, 2007)
- New York Stories: Landmark Writing from Four Decades of New York Magazine (Random House, 2008)
- My First New York: Early Adventures in the Big City (As Remembered by Actors, Artists, Athletes, Chefs, Comedians, Filmmakers, Mayors, Models, Moguls, Porn Stars, Rockers, Writers, and Others) (Ecco / HarperCollins, 2010)
- In Season: More Than 150 Fresh and Simple Recipes From New York Magazine Inspired by Farmers' Market Ingredients (Blue Rider Press, 2012)
- Highbrow, Lowbrow, Brilliant, Despicable: 50 Years of New York (Simon & Schuster, 2017)
- New York Crosswords: 50 Big Puzzles (Simon & Schuster, 2019)
- The Encyclopedia of New York (Simon & Schuster/Avid Reader Press, 2020)
- Take Up Space: The Unprecedented AOC (Simon & Schuster/Avid Reader Press, 2022)

== Film and television ==
Screen adaptations from stories published in New York include:

- Saturday Night Fever (film, 1977), from "Tribal Rites of the New Saturday Night", by Nik Cohn (June 7, 1976)
- Taxi (TV series, 1978–1983), from "Night-Shifting for the Hip Fleet", by Mark Jacobson (September 22, 1975)
- American Gangster (film, 2007), from "The Return of Superfly", by Mark Jacobson (August 14, 2000)
- Hustlers (film, 2019), from "The Hustlers at Scores" by Jessica Pressler (December 28, 2015)
- Inventing Anna (limited TV series, 2020), from "Maybe She Had So Much Money She Just Lost Track of It", by Jessica Pressler (May 28, 2018)
- Worst Roommate Ever (limited docuseries, 2022), from "Worst Roommate Ever", by William Brennan (February 19, 2018)
- "Four Seasons Total Documentary" (MSNBC short documentary, 2021), from "The Full(est) Possible Story of the Four Seasons Total Landscaping Press Conference", by Olivia Nuzzi (December 28, 2020)
- The Watcher (limited TV series, 2022), from "The Watcher", by Reeves Wiedeman (November 12, 2018)
- An Update on Our Family (limited TV series, 2025), from "Un-Adopted", by Caitlin Moscatello (August 18, 2020)
- Gold & Greed: The Hunt for Fenn's Treasure (Netflix series, 2025), from "Forest Fenn's Great 21st Century Treasure Hunt", by Benjamin Wallace (November 9, 2020)

== See also ==
- Media of New York City
