= Shitty Media Men =

Crowdsourced allegations of sexual misconduct in the media industry

Shitty Media Men was a crowdsourced Google spreadsheet created in October 2017 that collected allegations and rumors of sexual misconduct by about 70 men in the media industry, particularly in New York City. Moira Donegan, a former assistant editor at The New Republic, initially began the spreadsheet online anonymously.

In October 2018, writer Stephen Elliott sued Donegan for defamation over his inclusion in the list. The lawsuit was settled in March 2023, with Elliott receiving a six-figure settlement from Donegan.

== Initial creation ==
In October 2017, Donegan posted the spreadsheet, which allowed anonymous contributions to supplement existing "whisper networks" about allegations of sexual harassment and violence in the media industry. The list—in the form of a shared Google spreadsheet—was active for around 12 hours, during which time it quickly went viral within media circles. Upon learning that BuzzFeed intended to publish an article about it, Donegan took it down.

== Reactions ==
On October 16, 2017, social media personality Mike Cernovich tweeted that he was willing to pay $10,000 for a copy of the list. Cernovich later said that a source sent him the list but "was insistent on not accepting anything". On October 21, Cernovich promised to publish the listed names, but after identifying two journalists, he consulted his lawyer and withheld the rest.

On October 25, 2017, after obtaining a copy of the list, Politico contacted several publications with writers on the list. The New York Times said that since there had been no internal complaints about its employees on the list, it had not investigated them. New York magazine's publisher, New York Media, said that in the case of its employees on the list, "We have reviewed whether any type of action is appropriate and have acted accordingly. It is New York Media's policy not to disclose publicly any findings or actions taken as a result of this process so as to preserve the confidential and sensitive nature of these matters." One BuzzFeed staffer said the names were not a total surprise to many, and that the men's reputations preceded them.

The list also contained the names of multiple The New Republic and The New Yorker employees who had multiple accusations against them, as indicated by their entries in the list being highlighted in red. Constance Grady of Vox wrote, "none of the men who appear on the Shitty Media Men list, even those who were accused of multiple counts of rape, have faced criminal charges."

== Impact and fallout ==
On October 27, 2017, The Atlantic terminated the employment of prominent editor Leon Wieseltier, who was on the list, due to allegations of sexual harassment.

In November 2017, BuzzFeed began an investigation of its employees on the list, including its White House correspondent, Adrian Carrasquillo. In December 2017, following a new complaint of inappropriate comments sent to a coworker, BuzzFeed fired Carrasquillo for violating its code of conduct.

On December 6, 2017, Lorin Stein, the editor of The Paris Review, resigned amid an internal investigation into his behavior toward female employees and writers. He had informed board members that his name was on the list. He also resigned as editor at large of Farrar, Straus and Giroux.

== Purported Harper's article ==
In January 2018, while the list was still being discussed in the media, it was rumored that Harper's planned to publish the list's creator's name in an article by Katie Roiphe, which elicited concern about doxing and the list's creator's safety. The rumors prompted Donegan to preemptively come forward as the list's creator.

== Lawsuit ==
On October 10, 2018, Stephen Elliott, a New Orleans-based writer and founder of the literary site The Rumpus, filed a federal lawsuit in the Eastern District of New York against "Moira Donegan and Jane Does (1–30)" seeking $1.5 million in damages. Donegan was represented by Robbie Kaplan, a co-founder of the Time's Up Legal Defense Fund. Elliott was represented by Andrew Miltenberg, a sexual assault defense attorney. Elliott's lawsuit sought to make public the identities of those who contributed to the crowd-sourced Google spreadsheet.

Google reportedly told The Daily Beast that it would "oppose any attempt by Mr. Elliott to obtain information about this document from us."

Donegan attempted to get the lawsuit dismissed on multiple grounds, including that Elliott was a public figure who would need to show actual malice to prevail. In June 2020, New York federal judge LaShann DeArcy Hall denied Donegan's motion for dismissal. Hall ruled, "Plaintiff's degree of involvement in a controversy surrounding sexual assault, sexual harassment, and consent in the workplace, if any, is de minimis. [...] Defendant directed the Court to only a few tangential references to sexual harassment or lewd jokes in the workplace in Plaintiff's writing and interviews. And the Court is not willing to find that Plaintiff's more extensive writings and interviews about sex, BDSM, and sexual assault—unrelated to workplace issues—transforms him into a public figure with respect to the controversy here." Donegan then claimed she had immunity from liability under Section 230 of the Communications Decency Act, which affords providers and users of tech services fairly broad immunity for third-party content.

Hall preliminarily found that Donegan "qualifies as a provider of an interactive computer service", but added, "Conversely, the Court is unable to find that it is evident from the face of the complaint that the allegations against Plaintiff included in the List were provided to Defendant by another information content provider." Hall found it possible that Donegan created Elliott's entry herself, and allowed the case to move forward to discovery on this issue.

Elliott also argued that Donegan destroyed evidence related to the issue when she was advised she could face legal liability.

In March 2022, Donegan lost another effort to have the suit dismissed.

In March 2023, Donegan and Elliott settled the suit. According to The Daily Beast, the settlement included a six-figure payment from Donegan to Elliott. While Elliott said he did not know who added him to the list, he told The Daily Beast that the settlement was "enough money that it's basically an admission of guilt, and it feels like a victory".

In February 2026, an email between Michael Wolff and Jeffrey Epstein was released as part of the Epstein files indicating that Wolff sought assistance from Epstein in the leadup to the lawsuit, forwarding an email message already forwarded by Lorin Stein in which Stephen Elliott was seeking legal representation for the suit. There is no evidence, however, that Stephen Elliott knew of Epstein being contacted about the case. While Epstein's final response to Wolff's email reads "ill help anyway i can. if you like", there is no further evidence that Epstein materially aided in Elliott's lawsuit against Donegan.
