= JuicyCampus =

American website

JuicyCampus was a website focusing on gossip, rumors, and rants related to colleges and universities in the United States. As of February 5, 2009, it is out of business.

JuicyCampus described itself as an enabler of "online anonymous free speech on college campuses". Through strict privacy policies, it allowed users to post messages and comments without having to worry about identification. Readers were able to vote on which posts they found "juiciest", or most provocative. As of March 16, 2008 the site contained rumors for 59 colleges and universities. By October 2008, JuicyCampus had expanded to over 500 college campuses. Much of its content was related to fraternities and sororities.

The creator of JuicyCampus, identified in an article in The Chronicle of Higher Education as a Duke University alumnus named Matt Ivester, described the website as within a trend of "gossip 2.0", which he sees as "pretty entertaining". Timothy Chester, chief information officer of Pepperdine University, described the purpose of JuicyCampus in a letter written to Google as to create a "'virtual bathroom wall' for abusive, degrading, and hateful speech".

== History ==
The website began operation in August 2007, and was closed indefinitely on February 5, 2009 due to lack of revenue.

It was initially launched on just seven campuses (Duke University, Loyola Marymount University, UNC, USC, Pepperdine, UCLA and College of Charleston).

On December 8, 2007 from a computer at Loyola Marymount University, a student allegedly posted a threat to shoot random students on the campus' "Alumni Mall". The quote read, "I am going to shoot and kill as many people as I can until which time I am incapacitated or killed by the police." The Los Angeles Police Department apprehended the suspect. The police released the suspect without filing charges. The message was originally posted on the website 4chan.

=== Controversy ===
JuicyCampus has received much media attention for not censoring the content posted by its users. CNN released an article documenting the anonymous rumors on the website and the panic felt by students.

Matt Ivester, the site's creator, has done numerous interviews defending the website. Larry Moneta, the vice president for student affairs at Duke University said that when he asked Ivester to moderate the website Ivester refused and indicated that he believes moderation is an unnecessary step toward censorship. The Chronicle of Higher Education said that "the site revels in the publicity it gets" and that the website keeps a list of websites, including those that are critical of JuicyCampus in a blog. Ivester, a 2005 Duke graduate, said on his website's official blog that "Hate isn't juicy", encouraging users to think carefully about what they were writing and whether their posts were entertaining or just plain mean.

In December 2007, Randolph-Macon College blocked students from accessing juicy campus on the campus network claiming that the site had no intellectual contribution to society.

In January 2008 the undergraduate student government at Pepperdine University passed a resolution asking for a block on the site. The administration did not enact the block. Austin Maness, a Pepperdine senior who wrote the resolution, said that he felt that the move was "a mistake" as it increased awareness of the website. The administration of Pepperdine complained to Google; Daniel Rubin, a Google spokesman, said that Google removed JuicyCampus from its advertising network due to "excessive profanity". By January 2008, JuicyCampus moved to another advertising network. Texas Christian University students asked advertisers to not buy space on the website. In November 2008, officials at High Point University requested that the website remove the school from its servers. When JuicyCampus refused, the University blocked the site from its campus network. During the same month Tennessee State University (TSU) blocked JuicyCampus. Ivester criticized the decision and compared it to the People's Republic of China's censoring of the internet. The American Civil Liberties Union criticized the decision. JuicyCampus filed a lawsuit against TSU and asked students to join the suit.

In March 2008, the office of the Attorney General of New Jersey, Anne Milgram, started an investigation into the website. Milgram said that because the site promises to block offensive content, but does not have a mechanism for reporting such content, it may be in violation of the New Jersey Consumer Fraud Act. In March 2008 the office subpoenaed the website. JuicyCampus criticized the actions of the office, calling them "absurd."

In October 2008, The GW Patriot and "The Colonialist", two student-run publications at The George Washington University, called for students to spam the university's JuicyCampus page in order to fill the site with irrelevant material. Their goal was to reduce the forum's popularity on campus. The Purchase Independent, a student newspaper of the State University of New York at Purchase, published a pro-Juicy Campus editorial and an anti-Juicy Campus editorial. The pro-JC one argued that it helped contain "moronic" discussion and students to a single website.

Juicycampus ceased operations on February 5, 2009 because of financial problems, specifically an inability to turn a profit.

== See also ==
- College ACB
- Yik Yak
