= Are We Dating The Same Guy? =

Facebook groups

Are We Dating The Same Guy?, also abbreviated AWDTSG is a series of over 200 individual Facebook groups where women share dating profiles of men they matched with on dating networks to seek the opinion of other women who may have dated the same man in the past. The first group was created by Paola Sanchez and aimed at women living in the New York City environs. The groups have over 3.5 million members as of January 2024. The group's function is to post screenshots of a man's dating profile to that city's designated Facebook group, after which the poster asks "any tea?". Other users in the group will then share information about the man and share warnings. The groups are moderated by volunteers, and have been described as a feminist group.

The groups have rules saying that personal information such as addresses must not be included in the Facebook posts. Users attempting to join the group are also examined to prevent fake profiles. The group is mainly for straight women.

According to Vice, the men being posted about have no way to defend against accusations made about them, and on the other hand, posters cannot prove their stories unless backed up by others. Often times, members post pictures alongside personal information such as names, which may infringe on subjects' legal right to privacy. Lawyers have said these issues can lead to defamation lawsuits, and members can make false allegations and create fabricated stories. If members tell a man that he's been talked about on the group, the "snitch" will be banned and be "exposed to the whole group".

== History ==
The first Are We Dating The Same Guy group was created by Paola Sanchez. The first group was created in March 2022 in New York City.

A male counterpart, named "Are We Dating the Same Girl NYC" was created for New York, with mostly the same guidelines and rules to the original. When the original Are We Dating The Same Guy group found it, they denounced the new group.

== Operations ==
Administrators are told not to respond to men asking to have posts about them removed, and to not remove said posts. The people being posted about have reported being questioned by their employers about things they have not done.

Members of the groups sometimes criticise the physical appearance of the men being posted about. According to the Evening Standard, the groups "frequent[ly] mock" the appearance or dating profiles of the men who are posted about, despite being against the rules. For this behaviour, women are sometimes kicked out, or the group is disciplined en masse by admins. The groups have rules against hate towards men, but the rules can be difficult to enforce in large groups, with some having over 100,000 members. Some men have also been able to join the groups without being noticed.

== Reception ==
In October 2023, Sera Bozza of Body+Soul wrote that consistently using Are We Dating The Same Guy can "affect your real-world view". She wrote that "A few stories of cheating may persuade you to believe that all men are unfaithful".

Some lawyers and commentators have expressed concern that the groups fail to acknowledge the legal right to privacy and users can create false allegations and fabricated stories, and cyberbully men without them being able to defend themselves. This may lead to civil lawsuits against the author for defamation, harassment, and other related privacy torts. Netsafe, an online safety organisation in New Zealand, advises users of a similar group to familiarise themselves with the Harmful Digital Communications Act to ensure that posts do not lead to "harmful consequences".

The Independent reported that men who have been posted on the dating groups have felt violated, and that even if reviewed positively by potentially thousands of strangers, the men being discussed about may have their reputation slightly decreased due to the association with being on the groups. The Independent also reported that some men believe that the groups are created to spread lies or mock them.

Mashable reported that the growth of AWDTSG in recent years has led to the rise of a small industry of online reputation and content removal services, as increasing numbers of men seek assistance. A co-founder of Maximatic Media, one such agency offering these removal services, stated that many of the men contacting the firm do so in a state of panic after learning that allegations about them have circulated among tens of thousands of participants without their knowledge.

Mashable similarly reported that the growing visibility of AWDTSG and similar platforms has contributed to what commentators describe as a "public trial" dynamic, where subjective accounts about dating behavior are interpreted as factual assessments and can influence a person's reputation among large audiences within their locale.

The Oklahoman reported that anonymous, unverified claims in these groups have led some men to experience social and dating repercussions, although legal analysts argue that the benefits of community-based safety networks still outweigh these concerns in modern, app based dating environments.

UTV/ITV News reportedly spoke to a man who was posted who alleged he attempted suicide, was clinically dead for three minutes, and spent three weeks in a psychiatric hospital as a result of the posts made about him. Many other men have talked about malicious false claims made about them.

Self-described men’s rights activists have taken a dislike to these groups and have gotten multiple North American groups shut down by running campaigns, threatening lawsuits, and mass Facebook reporting. They also have Reddit communities dedicated to getting rid of such groups.

Women who have posted in the groups have felt that they have put their safety at risk, with some having been confronted by the men they posted about.

The group has been noted for exposing men who use dating apps while already in a relationship, misrepresent their ages, or repeatedly stand up the women they meet through apps, among other bad dating behaviors. For example, some members of the group had matched on a dating site with a man who had, several years prior, killed a stranger while having a mental break. After this information came to light, members of the group were warned. The group has also been noted to be complimentary of some men.

== Lawsuits ==
In 2023, a 41-year-old man sued the administrators of the London group for $35,000 under defamation, alleging that the group "called names, accused of sending lewd photos and of being a bad parent".

In January 2024 a man sued Meta, the owner of Facebook, along with Patreon, GoFundMe, and the AWDTSG website, as well as almost 30 group members due to alleged defamation, emotional distress, and invasion of privacy. Claiming that the groups violate anti-doxxing laws and do not fact check, seeking $75,000 in damages. He claims that the group shared fake images of him sending women texts containing harassment, his name and photo. His attorneys claim that if the images were real, they would fall under free speech in the First Amendment. By February, groups had raised $80,000. The Washington Post said that this case caused AWDTSG to "explode into public view". The case was dismissed in 2025 by the United States District Court for the Northern District of Illinois.

On May 15, 2026, the United States Court of Appeals for the Seventh Circuit declined to renew the case in D'Ambrosio v. Meta Platforms Inc., et al. The plaintiff and his attorneys, Marc Trent and Aaron Walner of Trent Law Firm, were sanctioned "for frivolously appealing the dismissal of the claims," "misrepresentations of law," in connection with falsified citations included in the plaintiff's brief, and " disputing at oral argument without any evidentiary basis that [the plaintiff] client sent the text message she attributed to him."

== Trademark disputes ==
In 2026, Sanchez faced criticism over intellectual-property complaints involving independently operated Facebook groups using names similar to “Are We Dating the Same Guy?”. Operators of some local groups alleged that the complaints resulted in their groups being removed or restricted, and said they believed Sanchez was using trademark enforcement to limit similar women-led community efforts.

== By country ==
=== Australia ===
In Australia, there are groups for multiple cities including Sydney, Melbourne, Adelaide, Perth, Brisbane and Rockhampton with many having several thousand members. The Sydney group has 30,000 members.

In March 2023, the Adelaide version of the group, which had 7,000 members, was shut down.

In 2024, groups titled "Sis, Are We Dating The Same Guy" stopped accepting new posts after an admin was sued for defamation and had to pay over AU$20,000 in legal fees. The case was settled out of court. The administrator announcing these closures cited a 2021 defamation High Court case involving detainee Dylan Voller, which led to the High Court saying that owners of Facebook groups can be held liable for defamatory comments, even if they did not know the comments had been made.

=== Canada ===
In 2023, a group was started for Ottawa. The founder previously was in a relationship full of "cheating and lies", which prompted her to creating the Facebook community.

In 2023, the group for Vancouver and British Columbia was shut down after concerns about men being unable to protect themselves against false allegations.

=== New Zealand ===
In New Zealand, the community is called "Do We Have The Same Boyfriend". The group gained 19,000 users in its first 24 hours. A few cheating men have been discovered on the group, however it is not common.

=== United Kingdom ===
The group for the United Kingdom was created in May 2022. There are groups for London, Nottingham and Swindon. The London group has over 86,000 members as of January 2024.

=== United States ===
There is a group for Hudson Valley which has 2,700 members as of July 2023. The New York group has over 136,000 members as of July 2023. There is also a Washington group which has over 11,000 members as of January 2024.

=== Ireland ===
There is a group for Dublin and Ireland, which had 7,900 members as of June 2023.

== See also ==
- Tea (app)
