= Ina Fried =

American journalist (born 1974)

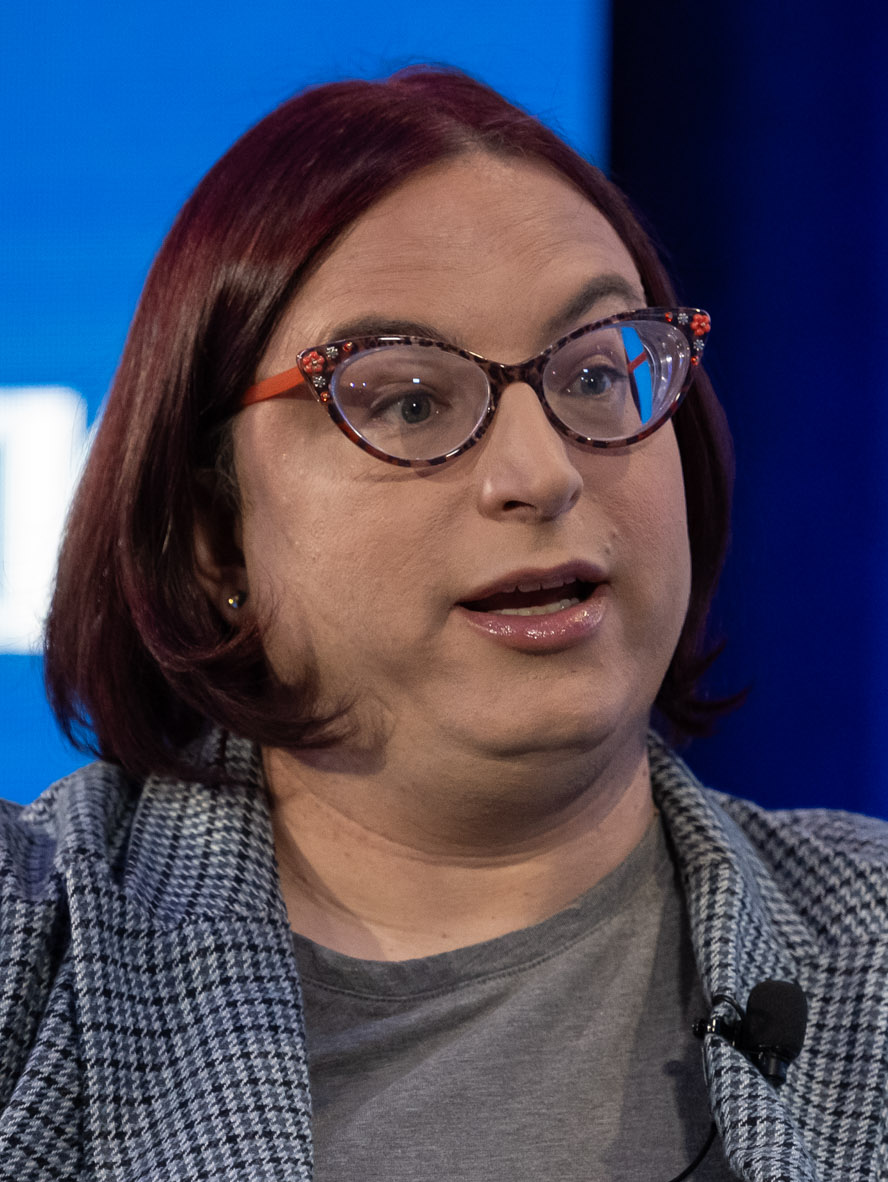
- Ina Fried in 2024
- Born: December 17, 1974 (age 51)
- Occupations: Broadcast journalist, writer
- Notable credit(s): All Things Digital, CNET Network's News.com, Orange County Business Journal, Orange County Register, Bridge News, frequent guest on National Public Radio
- Title: Chief technology correspondent at Axios
- Website: All Things Digital's Ina Fried page

Ina Fried (born December 17, 1974), formerly Ian Fried, is an American journalist for Axios. Prior to that, she was senior editor for All Things Digital and a senior staff writer for CNET Network's News.com, and worked for Re/code. She is a frequent commenter on technology news on National Public Radio and local television news, and for other print and broadcast outlets.

== Early life ==
Fried as a child actor was best known for her role as Rocky's son, Rocky Jr., in the 1982 movie Rocky III and also as the voice of the character Timothy in the 1982 movie The Secret of NIMH. After that she mainly appeared in guest roles portraying young boys on various television series including Cagney and Lacey, Silver Spoons, V, Alice, Diff'rent Strokes, Newhart, The Wonder Years, and a recurring role on St. Elsewhere.

== Professional ==
Fried is a personal technology writer and generally covered Microsoft related stories in the CNET blog Beyond Binary from 2000 until 2010. Late in 2010, she joined All Things Digital, where she covered the Mobile beat. In 2014, she joined Re/code, a tech and business site launched by Kara Swisher and Walt Mossberg. She joined Axios as chief technology correspondent in 2017.

Prior to CNET, Fried wrote for the Orange County Business Journal, the Orange County Register, and Bridge News. She has served as a board member, national secretary and national vice president for the National Lesbian and Gay Journalists Association (NLGJA). On April 27, 2011, Fried conducted an exclusive interview with CEO Steve Jobs and other Apple executives about the iPhone location tracking controversy. She now writes for Axios.

== Awards and honors ==
Upon retirement from the NLGJA National Board at the 2008 NLGJA national convention in Washington, DC, Fried was honored with both a Distinguished Service Award and a Women's Distinguished Service Award.

Journalism awards:

- Three-time winner of NewsBios/TJFR award: NewsBios/TJFR "30 Most Influential Business Journalists Under 30."
- Western Publications Association for Outstanding Editorial Content's Maggie Award.
- Society of Professional Journalists (Northern California Chapter) Excellence in Journalism Award Winner: 2005 Breaking News (shared), 2005 Feature Writing.
- Society of Professional Journalists' 2003 Sigma Delta Chi Awards for excellence in journalism: Deadline Reporting (Independent): Ina Fried, CNET News, (shared) for reporting about vulnerable technology and how the MSBlast virus spread.

Fried was featured in Advocate magazine's 2014 and 2017 lists of The 50 Most Influential LGBT People in Media.

== Personal ==
Prior to June 2003, Fried signed articles "Ian Fried". At that point, she transitioned from male to female and began using the byline "Ina Fried".
