= 2020 Webby Awards =

Virtual awards ceremony celebrating 2020's best web content

The 2020 Webby Awards ceremony was posted online on May 19, 2020, and was hosted by Patton Oswalt. Named Webbys From Home, it recognized the best of Internet content. Due to the COVID-19 pandemic, the award ceremony was held virtually at the organization's official website with pre-recorded material at remote locations. The ceremony included guest appearances from Michelle Obama, Kristen Bell, Tom Hanks, Demi Lovato, Anthony Fauci, Jill Scott and Questlove, among others. The awards were dedicated "to honoring individuals and organizations who are using the internet in response to the coronavirus pandemic".

Google and National Geographic won the most awards at 14 each.

== Winners ==
Category	Sub-Category	Award	Webby Winner	People's Voice Winner	Honorees
Websites and Mobile Sites	General Websites	Activism	The Third Strike Campaign (Granyon ApS)	*Privacy Not Included (Mozilla Foundation)	
Websites and Mobile Sites	General Websites	Architecture & Design	The Urban Village Microsite (SPACE10)	Architectural Digest (Architectural Digest, Conde Nast)	
Websites and Mobile Sites	General Websites	Art	What was Leonardo da Vinci doing at your age? (CNN)		
Websites and Mobile Sites	General Websites	Associations	World Press Photos: Connecting the world to the stories that matter (Emakina)	American Astronomical Society Website (Happy Cog)	
Websites and Mobile Sites	General Websites	Business Blog/Website	HBR.org (Havard Business Review)	Forbes.com (Forbes media)	
Websites and Mobile Sites	General Websites	Car Sites & Car Culture	100 years making history (HOY)		
Websites and Mobile Sites	General Websites	Charitable Organizations/Non-Profit	Our Stories Alzhelmer's Awareness Campaign (The Ad Council)	Equal Justice Initiative (Madeo Studio)	
Websites and Mobile Sites	General Websites	Community	Girlsclub Asia	Stack Overflow	
Websites and Mobile Sites	General Websites	Corporate Communications	Nike Purpose Website (Owen Jones and Partners)		
Websites and Mobile Sites	General Websites	Corporate Social Responsibility	Lyft - America Is An Idea, Not A Geography (Hello Monday and Even/Odd)	The Bear and his Scarf (Lucy Agency)	
Websites and Mobile Sites	General Websites	Cultural Blog/Website	It's Nice That	Becoming Prince (The Prince Estate / Base Design)	
Websites and Mobile Sites	General Websites	Cultural Institutions	Harvard Film Archive (Huncwot)	Rock & Roll Hall of Fame: RockHall.com (Media.Monks B.V)	
Websites and Mobile Sites	General Websites	Education	People Not Property: Stories of Slavery in the Colonial North (C&G Partners)	Pussypedia	
Websites and Mobile Sites	General Websites	Email Newsletters	Assembly, a digital publication by Malala Fund (Malala Fund)	The Washington Post's By The Way, Best newsletter (The Washington Post)	
Websites and Mobile Sites	General Websites	Employment	BASIC Culture Manual (BASIC/DEPT)	Fiverr: Creating Opportunities for Everyone, Everywhere (Fiverr)	
Websites and Mobile Sites	General Websites	Entertainment	YouTube Rewind 2019 (Hook)	Rotten Tomatoes	
Websites and Mobile Sites	General Websites	Fashion & Beauty	Good On You (Made Together)	Murad (BASIC/DEPT)	
Websites and Mobile Sites	General Websites	Financial Services/Banking	Happy Money	Wealthsimple Website (Wealthsimple)	
Websites and Mobile Sites	General Websites	Food & Drink	Bon Appétit		
Websites and Mobile Sites	General Websites	Government & Civil Innovation	USAFacts	VOTE411 - Election Information You Need (LookThink)	
Websites and Mobile Sites	General Websites	Health	BeThere.org (A.K.A New Media Inc)		
Websites and Mobile Sites	General Websites	Humor	Funny or Die	The Far Side (Andrews McMeel Universal)	
Websites and Mobile Sites	General Websites	Law	Knight First Amendment Institute Website (Tierra Innovation and Point Five)	Urban Justice Center (Superunion)	
Websites and Mobile Sites	General Websites	Lifestyle	HuffPost Life (HuffPost)		
Websites and Mobile Sites	General Websites	Magazine	National Geographic		
Websites and Mobile Sites	General Websites	Media Streaming	MasterClass	DC Universe (WB Digital Networks - DC Universe)	
Websites and Mobile Sites	General Websites	Music	Bastille - Doom Days Web AR (Powster)	Your 2019 Wrapped (Spotify In-House)	
Websites and Mobile Sites	General Websites	NetArt	150 years of Nature (MIT-IBM Watson Lab)		
Websites and Mobile Sites	General Websites	News & Politics	Reuters: Identifying and Tackling Manipulated Media (Reuters News Agency)	The Washington Post	
Websites and Mobile Sites	General Websites	Personal Blog/Website	The Kid Should See This		
Websites and Mobile Sites	General Websites	Professional Services & Self-Promotion	Zhenya Rynzhuk Folio (Individual)	Alan Menken (Hello Monday)	
Websites and Mobile Sites	General Websites	Real Estate	Urby (Kettle)	Compass	
Websites and Mobile Sites	General Websites	School/University	Pennsylvania Academy of Fine Arts by Message Agency (Message Agency)	Yale College (Fastspot)	
Websites and Mobile Sites	General Websites	Science	Lost Cities: A Sea of Coral (CaravanLab / Belle & Wissell Co.)	National Geographic Education Resource Library (National Geographic Society)	
Websites and Mobile Sites	General Websites	Shopping	GOOD TASTE (Six)	Bugaboo (Dept Holding BV)	
Websites and Mobile Sites	General Websites	Sports	1 / ST Website (DeepSleep Studio)	Every Body Has a Story (ESPN)	
Websites and Mobile Sites	General Websites	Sustainbility & Environment	Save Whales (Red Collar)	NASA's Global Climate Change Website (NASA/JPL-Caltech)	
Websites and Mobile Sites	General Websites	Television & Film	Give Her A Break - Oscars (Mojo Supermarket)	Our Planet (B-Reel)	
Websites and Mobile Sites	General Websites	Travel	Conde Nast Traveler's City Guides (Condé Nast Traveler)	Colombia Travel (Link)	
Websites and Mobile Sites	General Websites	Web Services & Applications	Paste by WeTransfer (WeTransfer)	Streamtime	
Websites and Mobile Sites	General Websites	Weird	Brand Name Pencils (Madison Ave. Collective)	Mental Floss (Minute Media)	
Websites and Mobile Sites	Features & Design	Best Data Visualization	Codex Atlanticus (The Visual Agency)	Your 2019 Wrapped (Spotify In-House)	
Websites and Mobile Sites	Features & Design	Best Home/Welcome Page	The Third Strike Campaign (Granyon ApS)	Nike Skateboarding Website (Owen Jones and Partners)	
Websites and Mobile Sites	Features & Design	Best Individual Editorial Feature - Ind/Brand/Org	Climate Science, Risk & Solutions by MIT (Massachusetts Institute of Technology)	Language Keepers - Emergence Magazine (Emergence Magazine)	
Websites and Mobile Sites	Features & Design	Best Individual Editorial Feature - Media Company	In El Salvador, violence is driving girls to kill themselves (Univision News Digital TIME and The Pulitzer Center on Crisis Reporting)	The Fact Checker's Guide to Manipulated Video (The Washington Post)	
Websites and Mobile Sites	Features & Design	Best Navigation/Structure	Pattern Radio (Google Creative Lab)	Wonderful Weekends (Active Theory)	
Websites and Mobile Sites	Features & Design	Best Practices	Human Interaction company		
Websites and Mobile Sites	Features & Design	Best Use Of Animation Or Motion Graphics	The Atlas of Moons (National Geographic)	DEMO - Design in Motion Festival (Studio Dumbar)	
Websites and Mobile Sites	Features & Design	Best Use Of Photography	Every Body Has a Story (ESPN)	2019: The year in pictures (CNN)	
Websites and Mobile Sites	Features & Design	Best Use Of Video Or Moving Image	Ending FGM - A piece of me (UNFPA)	When seeing is no longer believing: Inside the Pentagon's race against deepfake videos (CNN)	
Websites and Mobile Sites	Features & Design	Best User Experience	Roo - The AI Powered Sex Ed Chatbot you never know you needed (Planned Parenthood)	Your 2019 Wrapped (Spotify In-House)	
Websites and Mobile Sites	Features & Design	Best User Interface	Welcome to Bron Bron Land (ESPN)	Safe Cities 2019 (THE ECONOMIST GROUP)	
Websites and Mobile Sites	Features & Design	Best Visual Design - Aesthetic	Lusion (Lusion Ltd)	100 years making history (HOY)	
Websites and Mobile Sites	Features & Design	Best Visual Design - Function	Every Body Has a Story (ESPN)		
Websites and Mobile Sites	Features & Design	Best Writing (Editorial)	Writing on The New Yorker's Web Site (The New Yorker)	National Geographic Education Resource Library(National Geographic Society)	
Websites and Mobile Sites	Features & Design	Technical Achievement	Teachable Machine (Google Creative Lab)	Drone VR (Very Big Things)	
Video	Branded Entertainment	Animation (Branded)	Creativity for All (Goodby Silverstein & Partners)	The egg which doesn't kill the chicken (Brand Station)	
Video	Branded Entertainment	Comedy (Branded)	Make It with Idris Elba (Squarespace)	Now That's A Cardiac (Kovert Creative)	
Video	Branded Entertainment	Corporate Social Responsibility (Branded)	Detailed Voice Guidance Comes to Google Maps (Google)	Kindness Is Contagious (Klick Health)	
Video	Branded Entertainment	Diversity & Inclusion (Branded)	The Most Searched: A Celebration of Black History Makers (Google Brand Studio)		
Video	Branded Entertainment	Documentary (Branded)	A Surfer's Search (Rathaus Films)	"The Spirit of Conviction" (Complex Networks / Mindshare / Wild Turkey)	
Video	Branded Entertainment	Experimental & Weird (Branded)	Lynx 2 in 1 Shower & Shave Foam - THE BALLS (72andSunny Amsterdam)	Rick and Morty Adult Swim IDs (Titmouse)	
Video	Branded Entertainment	Fashion & Lifestyle (Branded)	Nails (Reebok)		
Video	Branded Entertainment	Integrated Campaign (Branded)	Dear Refugees (Big Spaceship)		
Video	Branded Entertainment	Live Experiences (Branded)	Parade Reimagined (Verizon)		
Video	Branded Entertainment	Long Form (Branded)	Bertha Benz (antoni garage GmbH & Co. KG)	Mars on Earth: Devon Island (Visual Lab at Google)	
Video	Branded Entertainment	Media & Entertainment (Branded)	Metro Exodus Artyom's Nightmare (Platige Image S.A.)	Play With Life (Hey Wonderful / EA)	
Video	Branded Entertainment	Music (Branded)	Artist Spotlight Stories (YouTube Music)	The Birth of Biggie: 25 Years of 'Ready To Die' (Amazon Music)	
Video	Branded Entertainment	Public Service & Activism (Branded)	Generation Lockdown (McCann New York)	Sandy Hook Promise - Back-To-School Essentials (BBDO New York)	
Video	Branded Entertainment	Scripted (Branded)	#MoviePosterMovie "In The Time It Takes To Get There" (RSA Films)	Oscar the Grouch (Squarespace)	
Video	Branded Entertainment	Series (Branded)	History of Memory (History of Memory)	The Star Wars Show (Lucasfilm)	
Video	Branded Entertainment	Short Form (Branded)	The Truth Is Worth It: Fearlessness (Furlined)		
Video	Branded Entertainment	Sports (Branded)	The Team That Wouldn't Be Here (McCann New York)	The Mind Behind - CS Santosh (Supari Studios)	
Video	Branded Entertainment	Unscripted (Branded)	Generation Lockdown (McCann New York)		
Video	Branded Entertainment	Viral (Branded)	The Lift (& Co. / NoA)	LEGO Droid Orchestra by Sam Battle (LEGO Company)	
Video	General Video	Animation	La Norla (Short Film) (NightWheel Pictures)	Lost & Found (Wabi Sabi Studios)	
Video	General Video	Art & Experimental	Epoch (Kevin McGloughlin)	Serious Klein - The Seed (Short Film) (ICONOCLAST Germany)	
Video	General Video	Comedy: Longform	Special (Stage 13)	Momsplaining with Kristen Bell (Ellen Digital)	
Video	General Video	Comedy: Shortform	The Daily Show with Trevor Noah - Trump's Best Words 2019 (Comedy Central Digital)		
Video	General Video	Diversity & Inclusion	In Her Shoes: India (Matador Network)	The Greatness of Girls (Mom.com)	
Video	General Video	Documentary: Longform	The Assassination of Jamal Khashoggi (The Washington Post)		
Video	General Video	Documentary: Shortform	Sponge Cities (WWF / World Economic Forum)	Cincuenta (Fifty) (Fenix Media USA)	
Video	General Video	Events & Live Streams	Greta Thunberg on the Climate Fight: "If We Can Save the Banks, The Can Save the World" (The Intercept)		
Video	General Video	Fashion & Beauty	Vogue Italia - Simone: A Survivor's Story (Good Company)	Shady: The Dark Secret Behind Your Favorite Makeup Products (Refinery29)	
Video	General Video	Food & Drink	First We Feast's "Hot Ones"		
Video	General Video	How-To, Explainer & DIY	The trick that made animation realistic (Vox)	Houseplant 101: Houseplant Home Makeover! (Homestead Brooklyn)	
Video	General Video	Music	The Sound of NYC's Underground Vogue Scene (feat. Qween Beat) (PBS Digital Studios)		
Video	General Video	Music Video	Cellophane (Object & Animal)	Earth - Lil Dicky (RYOT / SB Projects)	
Video	General Video	News & Politics	Sudan's Live Stream Massacre (BBC Africa Eye)	Hong Kong's huge protests, explained (Vox)	
Video	General Video	Public Service & Activism	#NatureNow (Gripping Films)		
Video	General Video	Reality	Drummers. Disruptors. for 'The Devi Project' (Cutting Chai Content)	BuzzFeed's "Mi Quinceanera Come True" - "We Gave This Girl Her Dream Quince" (BuzzFeed)	
Video	General Video	Science & Education	Timelapse of the Future: A Journey to the End of Time (Melodysheep)		
Video	General Video	Sports	No Limits: Wheelchair Basketball In South Sudan (International Committee of the Red Cross)		
Video	General Video	Student	WELCOME (Dyamant Pictures)	Rainbow Rodeo (University of Nevada, Reno - Reynolds School of Journalism)	
Video	General Video	Technology	Inside the traumatic life of a Facebook moderator (The Verge)	How your period is making other people rich (The Guardian)	
Video	General Video	Trailer	The Mustang (MOCEAN)	The Witcher - Main Trailer (Intermission Film)	
Video	General Video	Travel & Adventure	The Lonely Palm Tree (Zara Creative)	Rare Pant Survey on Thailand's Tiger's Nose (Homestead Brooklyn)	
Video	General Video	Variety	New Yorker Video - Annals of Obsession (The New Yorker)	Dressing Funny (Netflix Is A Joke)	
Video	General Video	Variety & Reality	The Late Show With Stephen Colbert: Stephen Has a Story (CBS Interactive)		
Video	General Video	Video Remixes/Mashups	Play That Funky Music Rammstein (DJ Cummerbund)	Marvel Cinematic Universe Phase Three Retrospective (Clark Zhu)	
Video	General Video	Viral	Motherly: I was going to fold the clothes but instead I held you (Motherly)	Best Ever Food Review Show	
Video	General Video	Weird	17 Small Ideas (Andrew Myers)	George Lucas reacts to Star Wars Trailer: Salty Celebrity Deepfake (Collider)	
Video	Performance & Craft	Best Art Direction	LIFE (The Unicorn)	Lil Nas X - Panini (Lord Danger)	
Video	Performance & Craft	Best Editing	#LifeChangingPlaces - Ethiopia (Kolle Rebbe GmbH)	That's My Jazz (Breakwater Studios)	
Video	Performance & Craft	Best Individual Performance	Cellophane (Object & Animal)	Stories From The Stage: Gastor's Lesson In Heavy, High & Far (WORLD Channel)	
Video	Performance & Craft	Best Web Personality/Host	The Daily Show with Trevor Noah - Desi Lydic Womansplains (Comedy Central Digital)	Joe La Puma - Complex's "Sneaker Shopping" (Complex Networks)	
Video	Performance & Craft	Best Writing	AFTERSHOT: An App to Help Cowardly Politicians Talk About Gun Control (Kelly&Kelly)	National Alliance on Mental Illness (NAMI) - Naughty Or... (Wieden+Kennedy)	
Video	Immersive And Mixed Reality	360-Video	12 seconds of gunfire: The true story of a school shooting (The Washington Post)	Infectious Disease Detectives (Chan Zuckerberg Initiative)	
Video	Immersive And Mixed Reality	360-Video: Branded	Training Empathy by Trading Ages (Primacy)	Reaction Time (WebMD)	
Video	Immersive And Mixed Reality	Animation (Immersive And Mixed Reality)	I'm Still Kenny (Coat of Arms)	Doctor Who: The Runaway (Passion Pictures / BBC)	
Video	Immersive And Mixed Reality	Best Use Of Augmented Reality	REWILD Our Planet (PHORIA)		
Video	Immersive And Mixed Reality	Documentary (Immersive And Mixed Reality)	Travelling While Black (Felix & Paul Studios)	Stealing Ur Feelings (Noah Levenson)	
Video	Immersive And Mixed Reality	Entertainment (Immersive And Mixed Reality)	Spacebuzz VR education programme for kids (Media.Monks B.V.)		
Video	Immersive And Mixed Reality	News (Immersive And Mixed Reality)	Venezuela, Stories of Crisis (The Washington Post)	Lessons of Auschwitz: Volumetric VR illustration tribute by school students (RT)	
Video	Immersive And Mixed Reality	Volumetric / 6-Degrees Of Freedom	Game of Thrones: The Dead Must Die Magic Leap Experience (HBO)	Lessons of Auschwitz: Volumetric VR illustration tribute by school students (RT)	
Video	Video Series & Channels	Animation (Video Series & Channels)	RSA Shorts - World-Changing Ideas (Royal Society for the encouragement of Arts, Manufactures and Commerce(RSA))	Tasty Truths (GALLEGOS United)	
Video	Video Series & Channels	Documentary (Video Series & Channels)	Great Big Story	What Can Be Saved? (The Associated Press)	
Video	Video Series & Channels	Entertainment (Video Series & Channels)	The Late Late Show YouTube Channel (CBS Interactive)	Honest Trailers (FANDOM)	
Video	Video Series & Channels	Food & Drink (Video Series & Channels)	Munchies (VICE Media)	Raphael Gomes	
Video	Video Series & Channels	How-To & DIY (Video Series & Channels)	Showcase (Tastemade)	Adam Savage's Tested One Day Builds (Whalerock Industries)	
Video	Video Series & Channels	Music (Video Series & Channels)	NPR Music Tiny Desk Concerts (NPR)		
Video	Video Series & Channels	News & Politics (Video Series & Channels)	Behind the Lines in Syria (Mother Jones)	"Because China" (Quartz)	
Video	Video Series & Channels	Public Service & Activism (Video Series & Channels)	The Culture of Pride - Pioneers of Love (Culture Trip)	A King's Place (G/O Media Group)	
Video	Video Series & Channels	Reality (Video Series & Channels)	My People, Our Stories: Los Angeles (AJ Contrast, Al Jazeera Digital)	Going From Broke (CracklePlus)	
Video	Video Series & Channels	Science & Education (Video Channels & Series)	BBC Ideas - short films for curious minds (BBC)	What If (Underknown)	
Video	Video Series & Channels	Sports (Video Series & Channels)	Stories of Ambition (The Precinct)	My Dream, Dani Alves (The Players' Tribune)	
Video	Video Series & Channels	Travel & Lifestyle (Video Series & Channels)	If Cities Could Dance (KQED)	Wildlife with Bertie Gregory: Season 3 (National Geographic Channels)	
Advertising, Media & PR	Individual	Augmented Reality	Escape the clown (Grabarz & Partner Werbeagentur GmbH)	JFK Moonshot (Digitas)	
Advertising, Media & PR	Individual	Branded Content	Apple - Bounce (TBWA\Media Arts Lab / Pulse Films / Framestore)	Listen to the Ocean (Africa)	
Advertising, Media & PR	Individual	Experience Marketing	Dalí Lives (Gooby Silverstein & Partners)	LEGO House Mini Chef (HiQ)	
Advertising, Media & PR	Individual	Game Or Application	Baskin-Robbins: Operation Scoop Scoop (22squared + m ss ng p eces)		
Advertising, Media & PR	Individual	Machine Learning And Bots	AI Versus (ISD Group)	The Algorithm of Life (Africa)	
Advertising, Media & PR	Individual	Online Guerrilla & Innovation	Give Her A Break - Oscars (Mojo Supermarket)	Lessons In Herstory (Goodby Silverstein & Partners)	
Advertising, Media & PR	Individual	Social Video	The Lift (& Co. / NoA)	It's All Coming Back To Instagram Now (Mother New York)	
Advertising, Media & PR	Individual	Student	The Forecast Emoji (Miami Ad School Europe GmbH)	Ikea - The Climate Change Collection (Miami Ad Hamburg)	
Advertising, Media & PR	Individual	Video Ad Longform	The Underdogs (division7)	We don't have balls (thjnk AG)	
Advertising, Media & PR	Individual	Video Ad Shortform	The Truth Is Worth It (Droga5)	The Most Searched: A Celebration of Black History Makers (Google Brand Studio)	
Advertising, Media & PR	Individual	Viral Marketing	Michelin Impossible (Ogilvy Sydney)	#SpotifyWrapped (Spotify In-House)	
Advertising, Media & PR	Craft	Best Art Direction	Smirnoff: Infamous Since 1864 (72andSunny New York)	Windows Into The Future (Cheil Germany GmbH)	
Advertising, Media & PR	Craft	Best Branded Editorial Experience	Google Year in Search 2019 (Google Brand Studio)	Watchmen x The Atlantic: The Massacre of Black Wall Street (HBO)	
Advertising, Media & PR	Craft	Best Copywriting	The Truth Is Worth It (Droga5)	Make with Idris Elba (Squarespace)	
Advertising, Media & PR	Craft	Best Use of Animation Or Motion Graphics	Cyberpunk 2077 (Goodbye Kansas Studios)		
Advertising, Media & PR	Craft	Best Use of Video Or Moving Image	Monica Lenwinsky - The Epidemic (BBDO New York)	Bacardi - Beat Machine (BBDO New York)	
Advertising, Media & PR	Branded Content	Auto & Auto Services	Abbey Road (NORD DDB Stockholm AB)	Visit the Road - California Stays (Belong Agency)	
Advertising, Media & PR	Branded Content	Fashion, Beauty & Lifestyle	The Non-Issue (McCann London)	Tom Ford International - New York Fashion Week - SS19 Runway Show (MOCEAN)	
Advertising, Media & PR	Branded Content	Food & Beverage	I'm Drinking It For You (Colenso BBDO)	Coors Light Art of Cold (Courageous Studios)	
Advertising, Media & PR	Branded Content	Health, Wellness & Pharmaceutical	The Tampon Book: a book against tax discrimination (Scholz & Friends Berlin GmbH)	GE - Don't Skip (BBDO New York)	
Advertising, Media & PR	Branded Content	Media & Entertainment	For The Throne (Droga5 / HBO)	Once Upon a Time in Hollywood Magazine (Watson Design Group, Inc.)	
Advertising, Media & PR	Branded Content	Products & Services	The Creative Types Personality Quiz (Adobe Create)	Oscar the Grouch (Squarespace)	
Advertising, Media & PR	Branded Content	Public Service & Activism	Generation Lockdown (McCann New York)		
Advertising, Media & PR	Branded Content	Tourism & Leisure	Go Back To Africa (FCB/SIX NY)	National Parks: Civilization Sucks (GREY NEW YORK)	
Advertising, Media & PR	Advertising Campaigns	Best Cause Related Campaign	The E.V.A. Initiative (Forsman & Bodenfors)	Flash Drives for Freedom (Human Rights Foundation)	
Advertising, Media & PR	Advertising Campaigns	Best Video Campaign	The Truth Is Worth It (Droga5)	Adidas Originals "Donald Glover Presents" (Mamag Studios)	
Advertising, Media & PR	Advertising Campaigns	Brand Strategy	The E.V.A. Initiative (Forsman & Bodenfors)	Tinder: Swipe Night (72andSunny Los Angeles)	
Advertising, Media & PR	Advertising Campaigns	Corporate Social Responsibility Campaign	Changing The Game (McCann New York)	Bracardi - The Future Doesn't Suck (BBDO New York)	
Advertising, Media & PR	Advertising Campaigns	Digital Campaign	Bonds Re-Loved (Lea Burnett Melbourne)	Bad Reviews (Kworq)	
Advertising, Media & PR	Advertising Campaigns	Integrated Campaign	Own the Controversy (LIDA/M&C Saatchi)	The Decade Wrapped (Spotify In-House)	
Advertising, Media & PR	Advertising Campaigns	Mobile Campaign	Monica Lewinsky - The Epidemic (BBDO New York)		
Advertising, Media & PR	Advertising Campaigns	Real-Time Response Campaign	Go Back To Africa (FCB/SIX NY)	Delivering Hope (MRM//McCann)	
Advertising, Media & PR	Advertising Campaigns	Social Media Campaign	Go Back To Africa (FCB/SIX NY)	Quest for The Throne (Droga5 / HBO)	
Advertising, Media & PR	Media	Best Media Strategy	Stage Your Driveway (FCB)	THINX - MENstruation (BBDO New York)	
Advertising, Media & PR	Media	Best Use of Data Driven Media	Febreze: The Most Undisruptive Radio Ads (Grey Midwest)	Web Companions (R/GA Austin)	
Advertising, Media & PR	Media	Best Use of Earned Media	Gillette: We Believe (GREY NEW YORK)	Born Free - The Bitter Bond (ENGINE)	
Advertising, Media & PR	Media	Best Use of Mobile Media	Maria's Message (Wunderman BA)	Spoiler WHOPPER (Grabarz & Partner Werbeagentur GmbH)	
Advertising, Media & PR	Media	Best Use of Native Advertising	Bacardi - Beat Machine (BBDO New York)	HBO - It's OK (Wieden+Kennedy)	
Advertising, Media & PR	Media	Best Use of Online Media	Face the hidden facts (NORD DDB Stockholm AB)	Spotify for Pets (Spotify In-House)	
Advertising, Media & PR	Media	Best Use of Social Media	Virtual Influencer Colonel Sanders (Wieden+Kennedy)	Unmasking a racist agenda (Hjaltelin Stahl)	
Advertising, Media & PR	PR	Best Cause Related Campaign (PR)	UNICEF Backpack Graveyard (UNICEF)		
Advertising, Media & PR	PR	Best Event Activation	Skittles Commercial: The Broadway Musical (division7)	Impossible Mascots (WMcCann)	
Advertising, Media & PR	PR	Best Influencer Endorsements	It's bubly! (Goodby Silverstein & Partners)		
Advertising, Media & PR	PR	Best Launch	The Tampon Book: a book against tax discrimination (Scholz & Friends Berlin GmbH)	Disney+'s 'Moving Day' (Disney+ and TBWA\Chiat\Day Los Angeles)	
Advertising, Media & PR	PR	Best Social Community Building And Engagement	Send Your Name to Mars (NASA's Jet Propulsion Laboratory)		
Advertising, Media & PR	PR	Best Viral PR Campaign	Sandy Hook Promise - Back to School Essentials (BBDO New York)		
Advertising, Media & PR	PR	Real-Time Response	Delivering Hope (MRM//McCann)		
Apps and Software	General Mobile & OTT Apps	Art, Culture, and Events	Urban Archive	London Art Studies (London Art Studies/the Academy)	
Apps and Software	General Mobile & OTT Apps	Education & Reference	Masterclass App (MasterClass)	NASA's Solar System Interactive Experience (NASA/JPL)	
Apps and Software	General Mobile & OTT Apps	Entertainment	The Star Wars App (Lucasfilm)		
Apps and Software	General Mobile & OTT Apps	Family & Kids	Toca Life: World (Toca Boca)	PBS KIDS Video App (PBS KIDS)	
Apps and Software	General Mobile & OTT Apps	Fashion, Beauty & Lifestyle	My Make Up Artist (Beamly (part of Coty Inc))	Macy's App - Redesign, AR, Style Quiz & Inspo (Macy's)	
Apps and Software	General Mobile & OTT Apps	Financial Services/Banking	Branch: Helping Hourly Workers Grow Financially (Branch)	State Farm Mobile App 2020 (State Farm Insurance Companies)	
Apps and Software	General Mobile & OTT Apps	Food & Drink	sweetgreen App (smallgreen)	Food Network Kitchen - Premium (Discovery, Inc.)	
Apps and Software	General Mobile & OTT Apps	Health & Fitness	St. Jude Children's Hospital Patient Care App (World Wide Technology)		
Apps and Software	General Mobile & OTT Apps	Machine Learning and Bots	Planned Parenthood's Roo (Work & Co)		
Apps and Software	General Mobile & OTT Apps	News & Magazine	National Geographic	Consumer Reports	
Apps and Software	General Mobile & OTT Apps	Public Services & Utilities	Global Citizen Mobile App (Global Citizen)		
Apps and Software	General Mobile & OTT Apps	Services & Utilities	State Farm Mobile App 2020 (State Farm Insurance Companies)		
Apps and Software	General Mobile & OTT Apps	Shopping	Warfair Mobile Shopping App (Wayfair)	Google Store (Google + BASIC)	
Apps and Software	General Mobile & OTT Apps	Sports	INEOS 1:59 Challenge (SOON)	The Bleacher Report App (Bleacher Report)	
Apps and Software	General Mobile & OTT Apps	Travel	Google Assistant's Interpreter Mode on Mobile (Google)	Expedia: Hotels, Flights & Car (Expedia)	
Apps and Software	General Mobile & OTT Apps	Work & Productivity	monday.com: Connecting 500K people to workplace processes (monday.com)	Trello	
Apps and Software	Mobile & OTT App Features	Best Practices	DeepL	Planned Parenthood's Roo (Work & Co)	
Apps and Software	Mobile & OTT App Features	Best Streaming Service	Pinna	PBS KIDS Video App (PBS KIDS)	
Apps and Software	Mobile & OTT App Features	Best User Experience	Night Sky (iCandi Apps Ltd.)		
Apps and Software	Mobile & OTT App Features	Best User Interface	Google Maps Live View (Google Maps)		
Apps and Software	Mobile & OTT App Features	Best Visual Design - Aesthetic	Sky: Children of the Light (thatgamecompany)		
Apps and Software	Mobile & OTT App Features	Best Visual Design - Function	Material Design - Dark Theme Guidelines & Article (Google)	Portal - Focus, Sleep, Escape (Portal Labs Ltd)	
Apps and Software	Mobile & OTT App Features	Connected Products & Wearables	Changing The Game (McCann New York)	Apple AirPods Pro (Apple)	
Apps and Software	Mobile & OTT App Features	Experimental & Innovation	SIGNS (McCann Worldgroup Germany)	Deaf 911 (Saatchi & Saatchi Wellness)	
Apps and Software	Mobile & OTT App Features	Integrated Mobile Experience	Lessons in Herstory (Goodby Silverstein & Partners)		
Apps and Software	Mobile & OTT App Features	Technical Achievement	DeepL (DeepL and denkwerk)	RoboKiller (Teltech)	
Apps and Software	General Voice	Education & Reference (Voice)	Paintings that speak (SCA)	1-2-3 Math (Sermo Labs)	
Apps and Software	General Voice	Games (Voice)	My Storytime (Google Creative Lab)	Drivetime	
Apps and Software	General Voice	Health, Fitness & Lifestyle (Voice)	Silent Whistle (Leo Burnett and MediaMonks)	Red Cross Blood Donation Voice Skill (American Red Cross)	
Apps and Software	General Voice	News (Voice)	NPR Visual Newscast (NPR)	The New York Times Briefing (The New York Times)	
Apps and Software	General Voice	Productivity (Voice)	SoundHound app (SoundHound Inc.)	Food Network Kitchen - Premium (Discovery, Inc.)	
Apps and Software	Voice Features	Best Branded Voice Experience	Pandora Voice Mode (Pandora)	Stories from Disney's Frozen 2 (Disney Parks, Experiences and Products)	
Apps and Software	Voice Features	Best User Experience	Google Assistant's Interpreter Mode on Mobile (Google)	WW App (WW)	
Apps and Software	Voice Features	Best Writing	The Voicebot Chronicles (KQED)	Amazon Alexa / Jimmy Fallon 'Tell Me A Joke' (NBC Entertainment Marketing & Digital)	
Apps and Software	Voice Features	Technical Achievement	SIGNS (McCann Worldgroup Germany)	Wait Wait Quiz from Wait Wait... Don't Tell Me! (NPR)	
Social	General Social	Animals	Duke Bush (Curiosity)	Dean the Basset	
Social	General Social	Art & Culture	BBC Culture	National Museum of Women in the Arts Instagram (National Museum of Women in the Arts)	
Social	General Social	Celebrity/Fan	The Tonight Show Starring Jimmy Fallon	Comments By Celebs	
Social	General Social	Corporate Communications	Women Will (Google)		
Social	General Social	Education & Discovery	Doctor Mike (DM Operations Inc.)	National Geographic Social Media (National Geographic)	
Social	General Social	Entertainment	#SpotifyWrapped (Spotify In-House)	Comments By Celebs	
Social	General Social	Events	2019 MTV Video Music Awards (MTV Entertainment Group)	2019 iHeartRadio Music Awards (iHeartRadio)	
Social	General Social	Fashion & Beauty	Glossier	Fenty Beauty Social Media (Fenty Beauty, Kendo Brands)	
Social	General Social	Food & Drink	Bon Appétit	America's Test Kitchen	
Social	General Social	Health, Wellness & Lifestyle	Doctor Mike		
Social	General Social	Lifestyle	Apartment Therapy Instagram (Apartment Therapy)		
Social	General Social	News & Politics	The Washington Post on Instagram (The Washington Post)	CNN	
Social	General Social	Public Service & Activism	#VaccinesWork (RPA)		
Social	General Social	Sports	NFL Tiktok (NFL)	Bleacher Report	
Social	General Social	Television & Film	Star Wars (Lucasfilm)		
Social	General Social	Travel	The Washington Post's By The Way, Best Social Media (travel) (The Washington Post)	Atlas Obscura	
Social	General Social	Weird	The Art Decider (Michael Tannenbaum)	Unnecessary Inventions	
Social	Social Content Series & Campaigns	Arts & Entertainment (Series & Campaigns)	@Sufferosa (Kissinger Twins Studio)	Today in Marvel History (Marvel Entertainment)	
Social	Social Content Series & Campaigns	Culture & Lifestyle (Series & Campaigns)	NASAMoonTunes (NASA Johnson Space Center)		
Social	Social Content Series & Campaigns	Diversity & Inclusion (Series & Campaigns)	Code Like a Girl - Losing Lena (Facebook Creative Shop)	RuPaul's #DragRacePrice (VH1)	
Social	Social Content Series & Campaigns	Education & Discovery (Series & Campaigns)	NASA Explores: Cryosphere (NASA GSFC/USRA)	Revealing a Black Hole (Havard Public Affairs & Communications)	
Social	Social Content Series & Campaigns	Fashion & Beauty (Series & Campaigns)	e.l.f. Cosmetics #eyeslipsface TikTok Campaign (e.l.f. Beauty)		
Social	Social Content Series & Campaigns	Food & Drink (Series & Campaigns)	Michelin Impossible (Ogilvy Sydney)	Sundays at Nana's (Tastemade)	
Social	Social Content Series & Campaigns	Health & Fitness (Series & Campaigns)	Roo High School (R/GA)	HBO - Inspiration Room - Diary Readings (Wieden+Kennedy)	
Social	Social Content Series & Campaigns	News & Politics (Series & Campaigns)	Election Confessions (NBC News Group)	Now This' "20 Questions for 2020," With the 2020 Presidential Candidates (NowThis | Group Nine Media)	
Social	Social Content Series & Campaigns	Public Service & Activism (Series & Campaigns)	Malaria Must Die Voice Petition (R/GA)	Wildlife Tourism Campaign (National Geographic)	
Social	Social Content Series & Campaigns	Sports (Series & Campaigns)	2019 FIFA Women's World Cup: FOX Sports Digital Coverage (FOX Sports)		
Social	Social Content Series & Campaigns	Television & Film (Series & Campaigns)	The End of the Fucking World (4creative)	The Addams Family (Revolve Agency)	
Social	Social Content Series & Campaigns	Travel (Series & Campaigns)	Only On Airbnb (Weber Shandwick)	JetBlue + RuPaul's "Shantay, Blue Stay" (Viacom Velocity)	
Social	Social Video	Arts & Entertainment (Video)	A Holiday Reunion (Goodby Silverstein & Partners)	#Nice Tweets with Tom Hanks (Twitter)	
Social	Social Video	Culture & Lifestyle (Video)	Adidas Originals Archive video series (Havas New York)	Culture Trip - America's First Cannabis Cafe (Culture Trip)	
Social	Social Video	Education & Discovery (Video)	Be Woke Presents: Black History in Two Minutes	Wild Life With Bertie Gregory: Season 3 (National Geographic)	
Social	Social Video	Events & Live Streaming (Video)	2019 MTV Video Awards - Stan Cam (MTV Entertainment Group)	JFK Moonshot (Digitas)	
Social	Social Video	Food & Drink (Video)	Popeyes — BYOB (GSD&M)	Tastemade	
Social	Social Video	How-To & DIY (Video)	DIY 'Game of Thrones' Party Snacks (eHow)	Self Defense Tips for Female Travelers (Tastemade)	
Social	Social Video	News & Politics (Video)	Selling Organs to Survive (CBS News)	Rohingya Crisis through the Eyes of Al Jazeera Journalists (Al Jazeera English Online (Newsfeed))	
Social	Social Video	Public Service & Activism (Video)	Generation Lockdown (McCann New York)	Be A Lady They Said (Girls Girls Girls Magazine)	
Social	Social Video	Sports (Video)	NFL 360: The LA Marathon: Nipsey Hussle (NFL Network)	"The Greatest Moment in US Soccer History, 20 Years Later: Brandi Chastain" (FOX Sports)	
Social	Social Video	Television & Film (Video)	Complaints Welcome (4creative)	The Ballad of the Peaky Blinders (BBC Wales Digital Drama / Casey Bailey)	
Social	Social Video	Travel (Video)	Igniting a Global Conspiracy to #GetNZonthemap (Augusto)	Disney Imagineer Executive Creative Director talks Star Wars Galaxy's Edge (In The Know)	
Social	Features	Best Influencer Endorsement	Nike - PLAYlist (R/GA)	US Open - Women Worth Watching (mcgarrybowen)	
Social	Features	Best Overall Social Presence - Brand	NASA Social Media (NASA)	Merriam-Webster: Defining the Times (Merriam-Webster)	
Social	Features	Best Overall Social Presence - Media/Entertainment	HBO Brand Social Media (ENGINE)	National Geographic Social Media (National Geographic)	
Social	Features	Best Photography & Design	National Geographic Social Media (National Geographic)	Nat Geo Wild's Instagram (National Geographic Channels)	
Social	Features	Best Social Video Series	60 Second Docs (indigenous)		TEENAGE DAD (season 3) The XY with Kirk Goldsberry; USA TODAY's Militarykind Facebook video series
Social	Features	Best Use Of Filters/Lenses	Sketch Me If You Can With PicsArt (PicsArt)		Fluid Face Filters: Pretty Kitten i am love | AR Book Cover; Robbie Conceptuel
Social	Features	Best Use Of Stories	Eva Stories (K's Galleries)	Saturday Night Live: Live Show Coverage (NBC Entertainment Marketing & Digital)	Frontline Negotiations Ghostwriters @SeedUniversity
Social	Features	Best Use Of Video	Apple - @apple UGC Video Edits (TBWA\Media Arts Lab)	Spies In Disguise: Music Video Series (Disney/Fullscreen)	
Social	Features	Experimental & Innovation	Baby Blocker (McCann Manchester)	Celine Dion: Album Scavenger Hunt across Instagram and Spotify (WMA)	Adweek's Super Bowl Bot ANIMATION DOMINATION SNAPCHAT MURAL; Close up #AmorLivre
Social	Features	Promotions & Contests	The New Yorker - Caption Contest (BBDO New York)		
Podcasts	General Series	Arts & Culture	Recording Artists: Radical Women (Getty)	Switched on Pop (Vox Media Podcast Network)	
Podcasts	General Series	Business	Pivot (Vox Media Podcast Network)		
Podcasts	General Series	Comedy	Judge John Hodgman (Maximum Fun)	The Trypod (Try Guys)	
Podcasts	General Series	Crime & Justice	Criminal (PRX's Radiotopia)		
Podcasts	General Series	Diversity & Inclusion	Pod Save the People (Crooked Media)	Dead Ass (Stitcher)	
Podcasts	General Series	Documentary	The Shrink Next Door (Wondery and Bloomberg)	Be Woke Presents: Black History in Two Minutes	
Podcasts	General Series	Family & Kids	The Story Pirates Podcast (Story Pirates)	Good Night Stories for Rebel Girls: The Podcast (Rebel Girls)	
Podcasts	General Series	Health & Wellness	Daily Breath with Deepak Chopra (Part2 Pictures)	Happier with Gretchen Rubin	
Podcasts	General Series	Interview/Talk Show	The Ezra Klein Show (Vox Media Podcast Network)		
Podcasts	General Series	Lifestyle	The Upgrade (Lifehacker)	Proof Podcast (America's Test Kitchen)	
Podcasts	General Series	Music	Mogul (Spotify)	Dissect (Spotify)	
Podcasts	General Series	News & Politics	Voting While Black (Color Of Change)	Stay Tuned with Preet (Some Spider)	
Podcasts	General Series	Science & Education	Overheard at National Geographic (National Geographic)	Science Rules! with Bill Nye (Stitcher)	
Podcasts	General Series	Scripted (Fiction)	Blackout (Endeavor Content and QCode)	Passenger List (PRX's Radiotopia)	
Podcasts	General Series	Sports	30 for 30 Podcasts: Season 6 (ESPN Films)	No Dunks (The Athletic)	
Podcasts	General Series	Technology	Recode Decode (Vox Media Podcast Network)	Darknet Diaries	
Podcasts	General Series	Television & Film	Behind The Scenes Netflix (Netflix)	Masterpiece Studio (MASTERPIECE)	
Podcasts	Individual Episodes, Mini-Series & Specials	Arts & Culture	The Sporkful: When White People Say Plantation (Sporkful Media & Stitcher)	American Masters Podcast (Thirteen)	
Podcasts	Individual Episodes, Mini-Series & Specials	Crime & Justice	Chasing Cosby (Herzog & Company)	To Live and Die in L.A. (Tenderfoot TV)	
Podcasts	Individual Episodes, Mini-Series & Specials	Documentary	Fiasco (Luminary)	This Land (Crooked Media)	
Podcasts	Individual Episodes, Mini-Series & Specials	Live Podcast Recording	#TellBlackStories: "Black Women & Girls" (Color Of Change)		
Podcasts	Individual Episodes, Mini-Series & Specials	News & Politics	The Trevor Noah Podcast (Luminary)		
Podcasts	Individual Episodes, Mini-Series & Specials	Science & Education	Twenty Thousand Hertz		
Podcasts	Individual Episodes, Mini-Series & Specials	Sports	The Lead (Wondery and The Athletic)	30 for 30 Podcasts: "The Sterling Affairs" (ESPN Films)	
Podcasts	Individual Episodes, Mini-Series & Specials	Television & Film	#TellBlackStories: "Black Women & Girls" (Color Of Change)	Behind The Irishman (Netflix)	
Podcasts	Features	Best Branded Podcast Or Segment	Recode Decode: "Silicon Valley" (HBO)		
Podcasts	Features	Best Host	ZigZag (Stable Genius Productions)	The Catch and Kill Podcast with Ronan Farrow (Pineapple Street Studios)	
Podcasts	Features	Best Individual Episode	The Chernobyl Podcast (HBO)		
Podcasts	Features	Best Limited Series	Dolly Parton's America (Osm Audio)		
Podcasts	Features	Best Original Music / Sound Design	13 Minutes to the Moon (BBC World Service/Hans Zimmer and Christian Lundberg for Bleeding Fingers Music)		
Podcasts	Features	Best Series	Spooked, presented by Snap Judgment (Luminary)	The Moth Radio Hour (The Moth)	
Podcasts	Features	Best Writing	Fiasco (Luminary)	The Dream (Little Everywhere)	
Games	General Games	Adventure	Arise: A Simple Story (Piccolo Studio and Techland Publishing)	Outer Wilds (Annapurna Interactive)	Borderlands 3; DERE EVIL EXE
Games	General Games	Family & Kids	Where on Google Earth is Carmen Sandiego (Ubilabs)		Block Party: Pattern Quest; Build-a-Squad
Games	General Games	Independent Creator	Astroneer (System Era Softworks)		ELOH; Enter the Reveries; Tick Tock: A Tale for Two
Games	General Games	Multiplayer/Competitive Game	Heads Up! (Ellen Digital)		
Games	General Games	Public Service, Activism, And Social Impact	STAX (McKinney)	Changing The Game (McCann New York)	
Games	General Games	Puzzle	Unheard (NExT Studios)	SongPop Live (Fresh Planet)	Overloot
Games	General Games	Strategy/Simulation	Planet Zoo (Frontier Development plc)	Cooking Diary Restaurant Game (MYTONA)	
Games	Features	Best Art Direction	Arise: A Simple Story (Piccolo Studio and Techland Publishing)	Borderlands 3 (Gearbox Software)	Remembrance Island; Where on Google Earth is Carmen Sandiego
Games	Features	Best Game Design	Sayonara Wild Hearts (Annapurna Interactive)	Borderlands 3 (Gearbox Software)	
Games	Features	Best Music/Sound Design	Days Gone (Sony Interactive Entertainment)	My Singing Monsters (Big Blue Bubble)	
Games	Features	Best User Experience	Telling Lies (Annapurna Interactive)	Borderlands 3 (Gearbox Software)	
Games	Features	Best Visual Design	The Best Inside (Illusion Ray)	Funexpected Math (Funexpected LTD)	
Games	Features	Technical Achievement	Changing The Game (McCan New York)	Harry Potter: Wizards Unite (Niantic, Inc. and Warner Bros. Interactive Entertainment)	
Special Achievement		Webby Agency of the Year	BBDO New York	N/A	
Special Achievement		Webby Artist of the Year	D-Nice	N/A	
Special Achievement		Webby Breakout of the Year	Houseparty	N/A	
Special Achievement		Webby Crush The Internet Award	Swizz Beats and Timbaland	N/A	
Special Achievement		Webby Media Company of the Year	National Geographic	N/A	
Special Achievement		Webby Network of the Year	McCann Worldgroup	N/A	
Special Achievement		Webby Person of the Year	Avi Schiffmann	N/A	
Special Achievement		Webby Production Company of the Year	m ss ng p eces	N/A	
Special Achievement		Webby Voice of the Year	The Daily	N/A	
Special Achievement		Webby Special Achievement	Kristen Bell; Black Fairy Godmother; Massimo Bottura; Miley Cyrus; Google Classroom; Invisible Hands; Nextstrain (Nextstrain.org); Tatiana Prowell, MD; Shopping Angels; Some Good News w/ John Krasinski; Swab Squad	N/A	
