= Katherine Boehret =

American journalist

- Born: 1980 (age 45–46); Allentown, Pennsylvania, U.S.
- Occupations: Internal Communications, Amazon
- Notable work: Former journalist and columnist, The Wall Street Journal (2002-2013)

Katherine A. Boehret (born 1980) works in internal communications for the Devices team at Amazon, an e-commerce and cloud-computing firm.

== Early life and education ==
A native of Allentown, Pennsylvania, Boehret is a graduate of the University of Delaware. In 2010, she was awarded that university's Presidential Citation for Outstanding Achievement.

== Career ==
From 2002 through 2013, Boehret was a journalist and columnist at The Wall Street Journal, where she worked with technology columnist Walter Mossberg. Boehret authored "The Digital Solution" column, which appeared weekly in the newspaper and online.

She was also a columnist and editor at the technology web sites All Things Digital and Recode, where she was deputy reviews editor and senior reviewer. She was an original staff member of both sites and also of the D Conference. After Recode was sold to Vox Media in June 2015, Boehret served as a reviews editor at The Verge, until July 2016.
