= NYC BigApps =

Annual software development competition

NYC BigApps is an annual competition sponsored by the New York City Economic Development Corporation. It provides programmers, developers, designers, and entrepreneurs with access to municipal data sets to build technological products that address civic issues affecting New York City. Through the NYC Open Data portal and other private and non-profit data sources, contestants have access to more than 1,000 data sets and APIs. Examples of available data include weekly traffic updates, schedules of citywide events, property sales records, catalogs of restaurant inspections, and geographic data about the location of school and voting districts. The contest is part of a broader New York City effort to increase government transparency and encourage entrepreneurship.

== Results & challenges ==
Year	Produced By	Number of Applicants	Winners
2009	ChallengePost	85	WayFinderNYC, Taxihack, Big Apple Ed, Trees Near You, NYC Way, PushPinWeb, UpNext 3D NYC, Actuatr, New York City Parks and Recreation Online, Bookzee
2010	ChallengePost	57	Roadify, Sportaneous, Parking Finder, Appetition, cultureNOW, Weels, NextStop, DontEat.at, NYC Data Web, NYCPlanIt
2011	ChallengePost	96	NYCFacets, Work+, The Funday Genie, Embark NYC, 596 Acres, Sage, TestFlip, ParkAlly, Uhpartments, New York Trip Builder, Scene Near Me
2013	CollabFinder	118	HealthyOut, Poncho, Hopscotch, SolarList, Hired in NY, Helping Hands, Child Care Desk
2014	HR&A Advisors	N/A	
2019	SecondMuse	N/A	

Some contest winners have gone on to become viable companies. For example, MyCityWay, was a contest winner in 2010. MyCityWay subsequently raised venture capital funding from FirstMark Capital and IA Ventures, as well as a strategic investment from BMW. Embark NYC, the mass transit application which won Best Mobility App in the NYC BigApps 3.0 competition, received investment from BMW i Ventures in 2012 and was acquired by Apple in 2013.

Yet like many app competitions driven by government data, many of the winning apps have not developed into viable companies. One challenge that civic hacking competitions face is that “they rely on programmers to define problems, instead of citizens or even government itself.” Hana Schank wrote of the 2011 contest that “the problem with the [2011] BigApps contest is that it leaves both user needs and likely user behavior out of the equation, instead beginning with an enormous data dump and asking developers to make something cool out of it”.

Recognizing these challenges, the 2013 BigApps competition introduced specific problem briefs organized around five “BigIssues” related to issues affecting New York City: Jobs and Economic Mobility, Cleanweb: Energy, Environment, and Resilience, Healthy Living, and Lifelong Learning. The competition also included events where organizations and City agencies versed in a “BigIssue” presented data sets and ideas to competitors.

== Contest judges ==
Judges for the contest have included: Dawn Barber, Co-founder, New York Tech Meetup; John Borthwick, CEO, Betaworks; Chris Dixon, CEO & Co-founder, Hunch; Jack Dorsey, CEO, Square, and Co-founder, Twitter; Esther Dyson, Chairman, EDventure; Lawrence Lenihan, Founder, CEO and Managing Director of FirstMark Capital; Naveen Selvadurai, Co-founder, Foursquare; Steven Strauss, Managing Director, NYCEDC; Kara Swisher, Co-Executive Director, All Things Digital; Fred Wilson, Managing Partner, Union Square Ventures.
