= How to Prepare for Climate Change =

2021 non-fiction book by David Pogue

How to Prepare for Climate Change: A Practical Guide to Surviving the Chaos
- First edition
- Author: David Pogue
- Language: English
- Genre: Non-fiction
- Publisher: Simon & Schuster
- Publication date: January 26, 2021
- Publication place: United States
- Media type: Print, e-book
- Pages: 624 pp.
- ISBN: 9781982134518

How to Prepare for Climate Change: A Practical Guide to Surviving the Chaos is a 2021 book by David Pogue, a science and technology writer best known for his work on CBS News Sunday Morning.

Pogue describes the impact of climate change in various locations, climate mitigation efforts by individuals and businesses, and practical topics such as the business and insurance aspects of climate resilience, personal disaster preparedness, and political and social participation in climate action.

== Reception ==
Positive reviews have appeared in Booklist, Kirkus Reviews, and The New York Times.

== See also ==
- How to Live a Low-Carbon Life
- Drawdown (book)
