= Earthscan =

British publishing house

- Parent company: Routledge
- Founded: 1982
- Founder: International Institute for Environment and Development
- Country of origin: United Kingdom
- Publication types: Books, academic journals
- Nonfiction topics: Climate change; Sustainable development; Environmental technology
- Official website: routledge.com/sustainability

Earthscan is an English-language publisher of books and journals on climate change, sustainable development and environmental technology for academic, professional and general readers.

== History ==
The Earthscan Publications imprint was founded by the International Institute for Environment and Development (IIED) in the 1980s and was run from 1987 by Neil Middleton. After making a loss, Earthscan became an independent publisher, moving initially to Kogan Page, although still printing many books emanating from IIED research. These included Desertification (ISBN 0-905347-37-4), by Alan Grainger, first published in 1982. Natural Disasters: Acts of God, or Acts of Man? (ISBN 0-905347-54-4) by Anders Wijkman and Lloyd Timberlake was published in 1984, and in May 1988 two titles were published: Women and Environment in the Third World (which discusses, among other topics, the Chipko movement) and The Greening of Aid.

In August 2009, Earthscan launched their Earthcasts series of free hour-long interactive Webcast sessions on sustainability, climate change and Corporate Social Responsibility. Notable figures who have participated in the series include Tim Jackson and Robert Costanza. In October of the same year, Earthscan acquired the publishing assets of RFF Press, the publishing imprint of Resources for the Future.

In March 2010, Earthscan won three Independent Publishing Awards, including the top prize of Independent Publisher of the Year, becoming only the second publishing company to win three Independent Publishing Awards in a single year.

In January 2011, Earthscan's name and the backlist was bought by one of the "big four" academic publishers, Taylor & Francis, for an undisclosed sum. The Earthscan imprint is still used, and sits under the Routledge imprint. Several staff lost their jobs and the London office was closed.

Earthscan authors include Lester Brown, Walt Patterson, Al Gore (Earth in the Balance), the IPCC, Tim Jackson (Prosperity Without Growth), Amory Lovins (Natural Capitalism), Molly Scott Cato, Jonathon Porritt, Felix Dodds, Chris Goodall (How to Live a Low-Carbon Life), Oliver Payne (Inspiring Sustainable Behaviour: 19 Ways to Ask for Change), Clive Hamilton (Requiem for a Species), and Sakiko Fukuda-Parr.
