= David Pogue =

Technology commentator (born 1963)

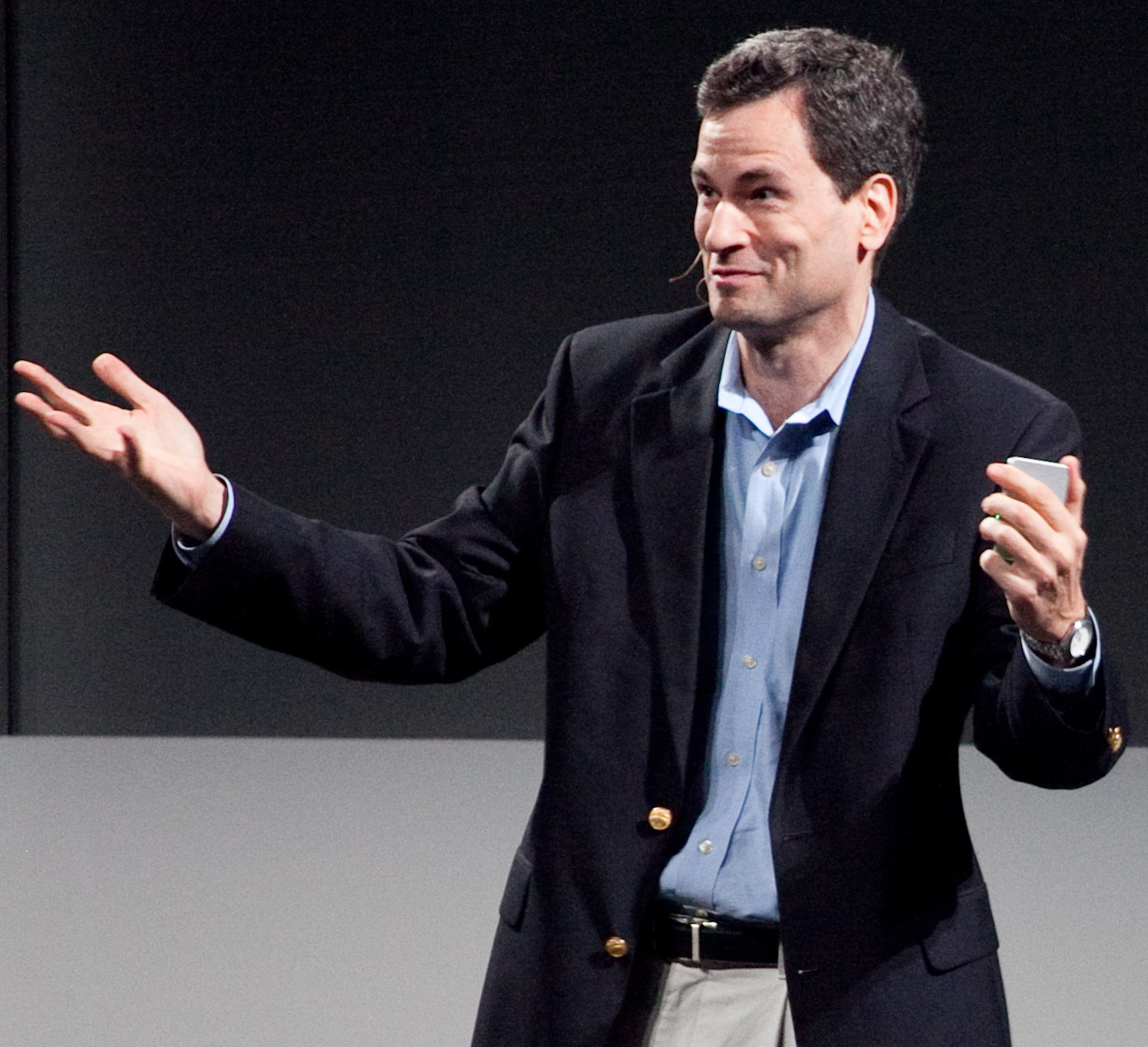
- Pogue in 2010
- Born: David Welch Pogue; March 9, 1963 (age 63); Shaker Heights, Ohio, U.S.
- Education: Yale University (BA)
- Spouse(s): Jennifer Letitia O'Sullivan (1995-2011); Nicole "Nicki" Dugan Pogue (2013– )
- Children: 3
- Website: davidpogue.com

David Welch Pogue (born March 9, 1963) is an American technology and science writer and TV presenter, and correspondent for CBS News Sunday Morning.

He has hosted 18 Nova specials on PBS, including Nova ScienceNow, the Making Stuff series in 2011 and 2013, and Hunting the Elements in 2012. Pogue has written or co-written seven books in the For Dummies series, and in 1999, he launched his own series of computer how-to books called the Missing Manual series, which now includes more than 100 titles. He also wrote The World According to Twitter (2009) and Pogue's Basics (2014), a New York Times bestseller.

In 2013, Pogue left The New York Times to join Yahoo!, where he created a new consumer-technology website. In 2018 he returned to the Times as the writer of the "Crowdwise" feature for the "Smarter Living" section.

== Early years ==
Pogue was born in Shaker Heights, Ohio, the son of Richard Welch Pogue, an attorney and former managing partner at Jones, Day, Reavis & Pogue, and Patricia Ruth Raney. Pogue graduated from Yale University in 1985 summa cum laude, earning a bachelor's degree in music. He spent ten years working in New York intermittently as a conductor and arranger in Broadway musicals.

== Career ==
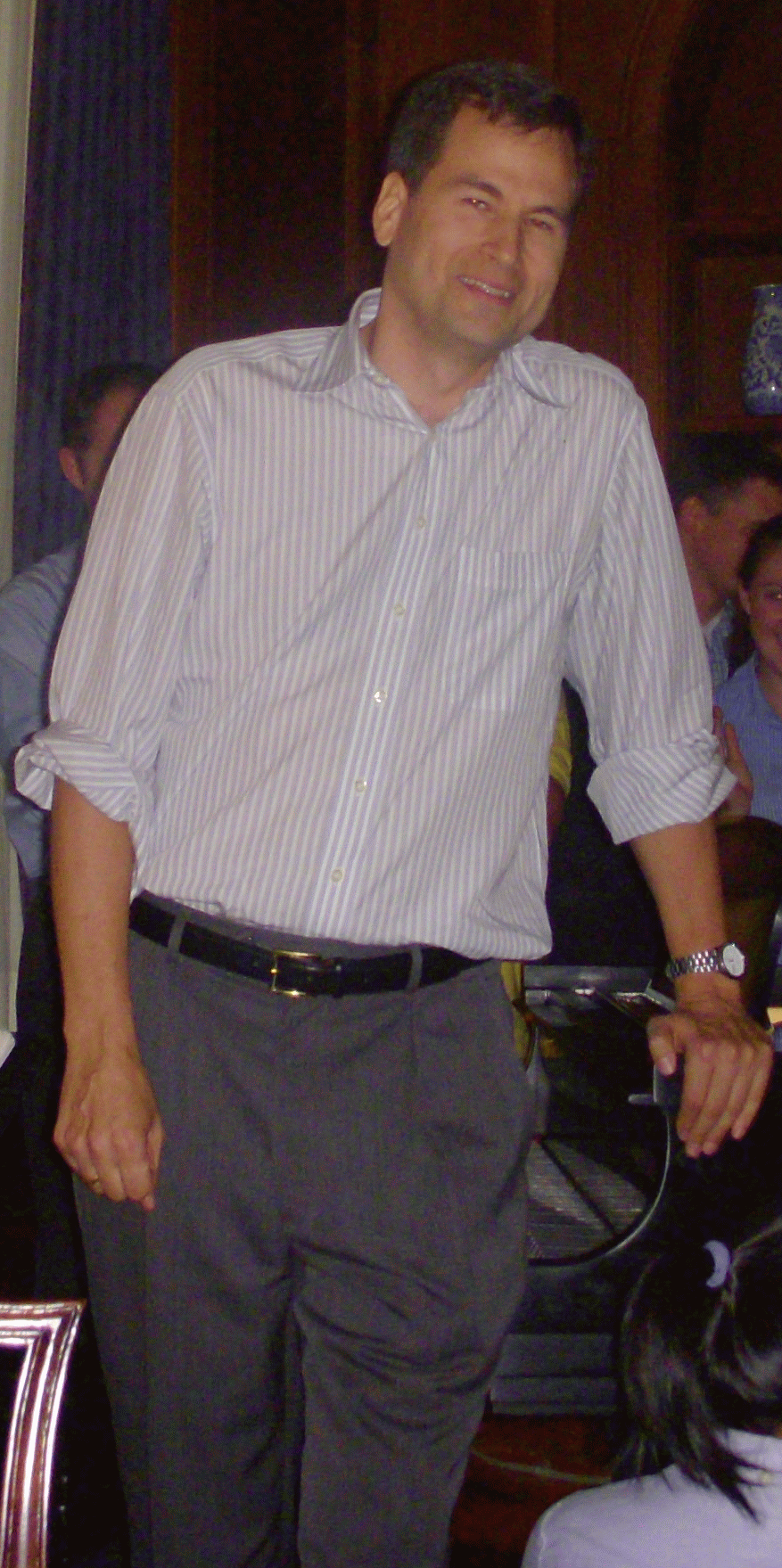
Pogue in 2007

Pogue wrote for Macworld magazine from 1988–2000. His back-page column was called The Desktop Critic. Pogue got his start writing books when Macworld owner IDG asked him to write Macs for Dummies to follow on the success of the first ...For Dummies book, DOS For Dummies, written by Dan Gookin.

Starting in November 2000, Pogue served as the personal-tech columnist The New York Times; his column, "State of the Art," appeared each Thursday on the front page of the Business section. He also wrote "From the Desk of David Pogue," a tech-related opinion column sent to readers by e-mail. He also maintained a blog at nytimes.com called Pogue's Posts.

Pogue joined CBS News Sunday Morning as a correspondent in 2002, writing and hosting stories on technology, science, the environment, and show business.

From 2007 to 2011, Pogue appeared on CNBC's Power Lunch in a taped, three minute comic tech review, which then appeared on The New York Times' website, nytimes.com, as well as iTunes, YouTube, TiVo, and JetBlue.

In 2007, Pogue was one of only four journalists (alongside Steven Levy, Ed Baig, and Walt Mossberg) provided with advance access to the first iPhone in order to review it. In the same year, the Discovery HD and Science channels aired his six-episode series, It's All Geek to Me, a how-to show about consumer technology.

From 2010 to 2019, Pogue wrote a monthly column for Scientific American called "Techno Files".

He hosted a four part PBS Nova miniseries about materials science called "Making Stuff," which aired on four consecutive Wednesdays from January 19, 2011. It was followed by a two-hour special about the periodic table, "Hunting the Elements," which aired April 4, 2012. He hosted a further series, "Making More Stuff," on Nova in 2013.

Taking up where "'Hunting the Elements' left off, Pogue hosted a three part PBS Nova series 'Beyond the Elements'," about how key molecules and chemical reactions paved the way for life on earth, including humans and their civilizations. The series aired on February 3, 2021.

Pogue's December 2022 report for CBS Sunday Morning, which questioned the safety of the Titan submersible, went viral on social media after the submersible went missing in June 2023 with five people on board.

Pogue is a frequent speaker at educational and government conferences, addressing such topics as disruptive technology, social media, digital photography, and why products fail. He has performed three times at TED conferences: in 2006, a 20-minute talk about simplicity; in 2007, a medley of high-tech song parodies at the piano (or, as Pogue joked, "a tedley,"); and in 2013, offering tips everyone should know ("a driver's ed for tech"). In 2008, he performed at the EG conference, also in Monterey, talking about cellphones, the tricks they can be made to do, and how the phones are often better than the companies that market them.

== Consumer advocacy ==
In July 2009, Pogue launched "Take Back the Beep." The campaign was designed to raise consumer awareness about American cellphone carriers’ mandatory 15-second voice mail instructions. Pogue wrote that the instructions are unnecessary, as most everyone knows "what to do at the beep". However, because consumers can not easily turn the instructions off (if at all), the instructions eat into consumers’ voice plan minutes. "I calculated that if Verizon’s 87 million customers leave or check messages twice each business day, that comes out to $750 million of air time a year — your money and your time, listening to pointless instructions over and over again." Pogue explained how consumers could bypass the voice mail instructions, encouraged readers to complain about the practice to their carriers, and provided links where they could file complaints. Other media outlets reported on the "Take Back the Beep" campaign, including radio stations and blogs such as Gizmodo, Engadget, The Consumerist, and Technologizer. As a result of the "Take Back the Beep" campaign, AT&T shortened its voicemail instructions to eight seconds down from 12 or 15, though no other carriers followed suit and Verizon Wireless did not respond to the campaign.

In November 2009, Pogue reported on a Verizon customer's complaint that the wireless carrier charged $1.99 for "bogus data downloads" every time an internet connection was established, even if the user did not intend to use the connection. The practice was validated by a reader who claimed to work for Verizon. The charge resulted whenever a Verizon customer touched the up-arrow key on some Verizon phones. The key is easy to hit accidentally and is preprogrammed by Verizon to launch the mobile Web, causing the consumer to incur a $1.99 data charge each time the key is pressed. As a result of Pogue's reportage, the Federal Communications Commission (FCC) asked Verizon to explain the data charge. In October 2010, in response to the FCC inquiry, Verizon agreed to pay up to $90 million in refunds to 15 million customers "wrongly charged for data sessions or Internet use," one of the largest refunds by a telecommunications company.

== Conflict of interest and other issues ==
In a 2005 New York Times review of a hard drive recovery service, Pogue noted that the service, which can cost from $500 to $2,700, was provided to him at no charge for the purposes of the review; but when describing the service for National Public Radio's Morning Edition program on September 12, 2005, he neglected to mention this. NPR's Vice President of News Bill Marimow later stated that NPR should have either not aired the review or paid for the services itself. Ultimately, the Times paid for the service.

In September 2009, Pogue's New York Times review of the Snow Leopard Macintosh operating system, a product for which he had also authored a Missing Manual book, was the subject of a column by The Times' Public Editor Clark Hoyt. Hoyt wrote that Pogue's "multiple interests and loyalties raise interesting ethical issues." Of three ethicists Hoyt consulted, each agreed Pogue's position created a "clear conflict of interest" and placed the paper on "tricky ethical terrain." In response, Pogue posted a statement of ethics on his Times Topics page and a disclosure was added to his Snow Leopard review on The Times' web site.

In June 2011, Pogue gave a presentation at the Media Relations Summit sponsored by Ragan Communications in which he offered advice to PR professionals on how to successfully pitch him. Arthur S. Brisbane, The New York Times' reader representative, subsequently wrote that the paper's ethics policy states staff members and freelancers on assignment "may not advise individuals or organizations how to deal successfully with the news media." Though Pogue is not a Times staff member and was not on assignment, an internal review determined that his presentation was not appropriate. In an email to Brisbane about the matter, Pogue wrote that in the future, "my speaking agent will now present every offer to my [Times] editor and me simultaneously."

== Awards ==
In 2004, Pogue won a Business Emmy as the correspondent for two CBS News Sunday Morning stories about Google and spam for taking "complex technological applications such as Google or Spam and [making] them comprehensible to the ordinary, non-technophile viewer."

Shenandoah Conservatory awarded Pogue an honorary doctorate in music in August 2007 for "his unique imagination of the boundary between music as a classical discipline and the computer of the future, and his artistic contributions".

In 2008, Pogue received a Society of Business Editors and Writers Best in Business Journalism award for his New York Times video, The iPhone Challenge: Keep it Quiet.

On May 5, 2009, Pogue won two Webby Awards. His New York Times online video series "was the only winner in multiple categories, earning nods for Best Reality/Variety Host and Technology."

His blog, "Pogue’s Posts" in The New York Times, received the 2010 Gerald Loeb Award for Online Commentary & Blogging.

In 2011, Pogue won the second "Golden Mouth Organ" award on The Late Late Show with Craig Ferguson for being the second person on the show who, when presented with a harmonica, could actually play it.

In 2013, Pogue was named an Honorary Fellow of the Society for Technical Communication.

== Works ==
=== Nonfiction ===
- Apple: The First 50 Years (ISBN 978-1982134594)
- Pogue, David; Scott Speck (1997). Classical Music for Dummies. Foster City, CA: IDG Books Worldwide. ISBN 9780764550096. Pogue, David; Speck, Scott (2015). 2nd edition. ISBN 9781119049753.
- Engst, Adam; David Pogue (1999). Crossing Platforms: A Macintosh/Windows Phrasebook. Sebastopol, California: O'Reilly.
- CSS: the Missing Manual (ISBN 978-0596802448)
- David Pogue's Digital Photography: The Missing Manual (ISBN 978-0596154035)
- The Flat-Screen iMac For Dummies (ISBN 978-0764516634)
- GarageBand: the Missing Manual (ISBN 978-0596006952)
- GarageBand 2: the Missing Manual (ISBN 978-0596100353)
- The Great Macintosh Easter Egg Hunt (ISBN 978-0425160060)
- How to Prepare for Climate Change: A Practical Guide to Surviving the Chaos (ISBN 978-1982134518)
- The iBook For Dummies (ISBN 978-0764506475)
- iLife '04: The Missing Manual (ISBN 978-0596006945)
- iLife '05: The Missing Manual (ISBN 978-0596100360)
- The iMac For Dummies (ISBN 0764504959)
- iMovie: The Missing Manual (ISBN 1565928598)
- iMovie 2: The Missing Manual (ISBN 978-0596001049)
- iMovie 3 & iDVD: The Missing Manual (ISBN 978-0596005078)
- iMovie 4 & iDVD: The Missing Manual (ISBN 978-0596006938)
- iMovie HD & iDVD 5: The Missing Manual (ISBN 978-0596100339)
- iMovie 6 & iDVD: The Missing Manual (ISBN 978-0596527266)
- iMovie '08 & iDVD: The Missing Manual (ISBN 978-0596516192)
- iMovie '09 & iDVD: The Missing Manual (ISBN 978-0596801410)
- iMovie '11 & iDVD: The Missing Manual (ISBN 978-1449393274)
- iPhoto: The Missing Manual (ISBN 978-0596003654)
- iPhoto 2: The Missing Manual (ISBN 978-0596005061)
- iPhoto 4: The Missing Manual (ISBN 978-0596006921)
- iPhoto 5: The Missing Manual (ISBN 978-0596100346)
- iPhoto 6: The Missing Manual (ISBN 978-0596527259)
- iPhoto '08: The Missing Manual (ISBN 978-0596516185)
- iPhoto '09: The Missing Manual (ISBN 978-0596801441)
- iPhoto '11: The Missing Manual (ISBN 978-1449393236)
- Mac OS 9: The Missing Manual (ISBN 978-1565928572)
- Mac OS X: The Missing Manual (ISBN 0596000820)
- Mac OS X Hints (with Rob Griffiths) (ISBN 978-0596004514)
- Macs For Dummies (ISBN 978-0764503986)
- Macworld Mac Secrets (6 total editions) (with Joseph Schorr) (ISBN 978-0764534157)
- Magic For Dummies (ISBN 978-0764551017)
- The Microsloth Joke Book: A Satire (editor) (ISBN 978-0425160541)
- More Macs For Dummies (ISBN 978-0764502675)
- Opera For Dummies (with Scott Speck) (ISBN 978-0764550102)
- PalmPilot: The Ultimate Guide (ISBN 1565926005)
- Switching to the Mac: The Missing Manual (ISBN 978-0596004521)
- Tales from the Tech Line: Hilarious Strange-But-True Stories from the Computer Industry's Technical-Support Hotlines (editor) (ISBN 978-0425163634)
- The Weird Wide Web (with Erfert Fenton) (ISBN 978-0614262995)
- Windows Me: The Missing Manual (ISBN 978-0596000097)
- Windows Vista: The Missing Manual (ISBN 978-0596528270)
- Windows Vista for Starters: The Missing Manual (ISBN 978-0596528263)
- Windows XP Home Edition: The Missing Manual (ISBN 978-0596008970)
- Windows XP Pro: The Missing Manual (ISBN 978-0596008987)
- The World According to Twitter (ISBN 978-1579128272)
- Windows 8.0: The Missing Manual (ISBN 978-1449314033)
- Windows 8.1: The Missing Manual (ISBN 978-1449371623)
- Windows 10: The Missing Manual (ISBN 978-1491947173)
- Windows 10 May 2019 Update: The Missing Manual (ISBN 978-1492057291)
- Pogue's Basics: Essential Tips and Shortcuts (That No One Bothers to Tell You) for Simplifying the Technology in Your Life (ISBN 9781250053480)
- Pogue's Basics: Life: Essential Tips and Shortcuts (That No One Bothers to Tell You) for Simplifying Your Day (ISBN 9781250080431)

=== Fiction ===
- Pogue, David (1993). Hard Drive: A Novel By David Pogue. New York: Berkeley. Reprint 1995: Ace (ISBN 9780441002559). Mass market paperback edition: Diamond Books
- Abby Carnelia's One and Only Magical Power (2010, novel for middle-schoolers) (ISBN 978-1596433847)
