= Charlotte Brewer =

English medievalist and literary scholar

Charlotte Brewer (born 1956) is professor of English language and literature at Hertford College, Oxford. Before joining Hertford in 1990, she was a thesis fellow at All Souls College, Oxford. She has also taught at the University of Leeds and Lady Margaret Hall, Oxford. Her teaching covers Old and Middle English literature and the history of the English language.

Brewer began her research career as a medievalist, with publications on the late Middle English poem Piers Plowman and its textual and editing history. The poet appears to have produced several versions of Piers Plowman at different times. Brewer's book Piers Plowman: the Z version (edited with A.G. Rigg, Toronto 1983) advanced the view that a disregarded manuscript in Oxford's Bodley Library (Bodley 851) might be an early, or even first, iteration of the poem rather than a conflation of two other versions. In a later book, Piers Plowman: the Evolution of the Poem (Cambridge University Press, 1996; reprinted 2006), Brewer looked at how editors producing single printed texts of the poem over the last five centuries assessed the evidence of the poet's original intent from the numerous and lexically varied scribal manuscripts available for scholarly interpretation.

Brewer later shifted her research focus to the Oxford English Dictionary (OED). Brewer's recent research interest has attempted to understand how the OED has chosen quotations. Her 2007 book Treasure House of the Language: the Living OED covered the history of the second Supplement to the OED. In 2009, Brewer held a Leverhulme Research Fellowship to explore the OED's treatment of female-authored quotation sources of the eighteenth century. As of 2025 she is working with Dr Stephen Turton on an edition of James Murray's papers and correspondence, a pilot version of which forms the Murray Scriptorium website.

== Personal life ==
Brewer is married to the environmental writer Chris Goodall and has three daughters.

== Selected publications ==
- Brewer, Charlotte (March 2014). "The Society's Dictionary: articles and excerpts on the OED" (PDF). Transactions of the Philological Society (Virtual issue).
- Brewer, Charlotte (2007). Treasure-house of the language: the living OED. Yale UP. ISBN 9780300209556.
- Brewer, Charlotte; Rigg, A. G., eds. (1994). Piers Plowman : a facsimile of the Z-text in Bodleian Library, Oxford, MS Bodley 851. D S Brewer. ISBN 9780859913966.
- Rigg, Arthur G.; Brewer, Charlotte, eds. (2000). Piers Plowman: The Z Version. Toronto: Pontifical Institute for Medieval Studies. ISBN 9780888440594.
- Brewer, Charlotte (1996). Editing "Piers Plowman": the evolution of the text. Cambridge University Press. ISBN 0521342503.
