= It's All Geek to Me =

- Created by: David Pogue
- Country of origin: United States
- No. of seasons: 1
- No. of episodes: 12

Production
- Running time: 30 minutes

Original release
- Network: The Science Channel
- Release: May 18 – July 20, 2007

It's All Geek to Me is a television program created and hosted by David Pogue that was broadcast on HD Theater and Science Channel. It first aired on May 18, 2007.

To describe it, Pogue writes in his blog, "What is it? Think 'funny cooking show'—except instead of whipping up food, I'll be whipping up technology projects!"

== Episodes ==
- "Digital Cameras" — May 18, 2007
- "Cell Phones" — May 18, 2007
- "iPods" — May 25, 2007
- "Laptops" — June 1, 2007
- "Saving Past Data" — June 8, 2007
- "Camcorders" — June 15, 2007
- "Editing Digital Photos" — July 6, 2007
- "Freak 411" — July 20, 2007
- "iPod: More Than Music" — July 20, 2007
- "Laptop Battery Life" — July 20, 2007
- "Megapixel Myth" — July 20, 2007
- "Restoring Old Floppy Disks" — July 20, 2007
