= Chris Goodall =

English businessman, author and expert on new energy technologies

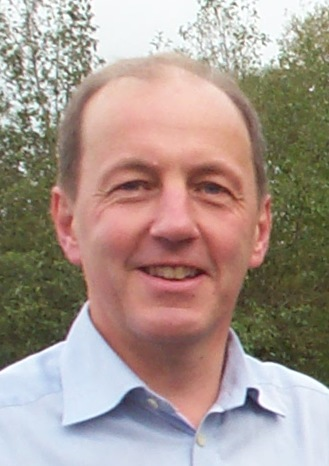
Chris Goodall, in 2006.

Christopher Frank William Goodall (born 29 December 1955) is an English businessman, author and expert on new energy technologies. He was the Green Party candidate for Oxford West and Abingdon in the 2024 general election, having run in the same constituency in 2010. He writes Carbon Commentary, a newsletter on global advances in clean energy. His latest book, Possible: Ways to Net Zero, was published by Profile Books in March 2024.

== Education ==
Goodall attended St Dunstan's College, University of Cambridge, and Harvard Business School (MBA).

== Writing ==
Goodall's first book How to Live a Low-Carbon Life, won the 2007 Clarion Award for non-fiction. His second book, Ten Technologies to Fix Energy and Climate, was one of the Financial Times' Books of the Year. First published in 2008, it was revised and updated in 2010. His third book, The Green Guide For Business, was published in 2010 by Profile Books. Goodall also wrote Sustainability: All That Matters, which was published in 2012 by Hodder & Stoughton.

In July 2016, The Switch was published by Profile Books, focusing on solar, storage and new energy technologies.

Goodall's What We Need To Do Now: For a Zero Carbon Future (2020, Profile Books: ISBN 978-1788164719) was short-listed for the 2020 Wainwright Prize for writing on global conservation.

Goodall has written for The Guardian, the Independent, and The Ecologist among others. He has spoken at literary festivals around the UK, at the British Library, the Science Museum and many universities.

== Stance on nuclear energy ==
On the issue of UK's energy mix, Goodall used to consider that nuclear power had a role in reducing greenhouse gas emissions. Goodall said "Including nuclear power in this mix will make a low-carbon and energy-secure future easier to achieve". However, he opposed the construction of the Hinkley Point C nuclear power station.

More recently, Goodall has changed his position on nuclear and his analysis has focused on how the UK can move to a future powered by 100% renewables. This is evident from his Carbon Commentary blog and his 2020 book, What we Need to Do Now.

== Trusteeships and advisory roles ==
Goodall helped develop the UK's first employee-owned solar PV installation in 2011 at the Eden Project.

== Personal life ==
Goodall is married to the academic Charlotte Brewer; they live in Oxford and have three children. Goodall is a Christian.

== Books ==
- How to Live a Low-Carbon Life (2007, Earthscan, ISBN 9781844074266)
- Ten Technologies to Save the Planet (2008, Profile Books, ISBN 9781846688683)
- The Green Guide For Business (2010, Profile Books, ISBN 9781846688744)
- Sustainability: All That Matters (2012, Hodder & Stoughton/Hachette, ISBN 9781444174427)
- The Switch (2016, Profile Books, ISBN 9781782832485)
- What We Need To Do Now: For a Zero Carbon Future (2020, Profile Books, ISBN 9781788164719)
- Possible: Ways to Net Zero (2024, Profile Books, ISBN 978-1-80081-896-5)
