= Arise: A Simple Story =

2019 video game

- Developer: Piccolo Studio
- Publishers: Untold Tales; Techland
- Engine: Unreal Engine 4
- Platforms: PlayStation 4; Windows; Xbox One; Nintendo Switch
- Release: PS4, Windows, Xbox One; December 3, 2019; Nintendo Switch; April 28, 2022
- Genre: Puzzle-platform
- Mode: Single-player

Arise: A Simple Story is a puzzle-platform game developed by Piccolo Studio and published by Untold Tales and Techland. Players guide a recently deceased man through the afterlife as he relives memories of his life.

== Plot ==
After an older tribesman dies and is placed on a funeral pyre, he relives his memories in the afterlife. Players guide him through various puzzles representing his good and bad memories.

== Development ==
The game's art style was influenced by Studio Ghibli and early Disney animated films, especially Fantasia. The artists used Clint Eastwood's minimalist acting as a model for their character and attempted to convey as much emotion as possible through body language. The puzzles were designed to be reminiscent of the protagonist's mental state and age. When reliving youth-oriented memories, the puzzles were made more active and exciting, while memories from older age took into account the challenges of performing ordinary tasks. Similarly, the art style is vivid during good memories and bleak during bad memories.

It was released on Microsoft Windows, PlayStation 4, and Xbox One on December 3, 2019. The Nintendo Switch version was released on April 28, 2022. The game sold well in its first week on the Switch store. The publisher, Untold Tales, attributed this to positive reviews from professional reviewers, being featured on Nintendo's official social media, opening with a discount, and positive word of mouth from players, who made connections between Arise and other games that sold well.

== Reception ==
Arise: A Simple Story received positive reviews on the review aggregation website Metacritic. Fellow review aggregator OpenCritic assessed that the game received strong approval, being recommended by 81% of critics. Reviewing the Xbox One version, Polygon and Game Informer criticized the platform puzzles as frustrating, though they both praised the game. Matt Miller wrote for Game Informer, "Even with some stumbles, Arise is a game that knows what it wants to communicate, and does so with delicacy and sensitivity." Liam Croft of Push Square called the PlayStation 4 version "an experience that delights every sense imaginable". Will Aickman reviewed the Windows version for Adventure Gamers and wrote, "A few presentation issues aside, it's a moving, thought-provoking experience that tells a complete story with scarcely a word."

It won best adventure game and best art direction at the 2020 Webby Awards. Arise received a nomination for Outstanding Achievement in Original Music Composition during the 23rd Annual D.I.C.E. Awards.
