= How to Live a Low-Carbon Life =

2007 book by Chris Goodall

- First edition
- Author: Chris Goodall
- Publication date: 2007
- ISBN: 9781844074266
- OCLC: 76937408
- Dewey Decimal: 363.738/7 22
- LC Class: QC879.8 .G62 2007

How to Live a Low-Carbon Life: The Individual's Guide to Stopping Climate Change is a 2007 book by Chris Goodall, published by Earthscan/Routledge.

According to New Scientist, this book provides "the definitive guide to reducing your carbon footprint". Goodall explains how consumers can cut carbon usage by 75 percent without making drastic lifestyle changes.

How to Live a Low-Carbon Life has been reviewed in the Journal of Environmental Health Research, The Guardian, and The Times.

How to Live a Low-carbon Life won the 2007 Clarion award for non-fiction.

A second edition was published in 2010.

== See also ==
- Ten Technologies to Save the Planet
- How to Prepare for Climate Change: A Practical Guide to Surviving the Chaos
