= Ed Baig =

American journalist

- Occupation: Columnist
- Website: Baig's personal website

Edward C. Baig is an American technology columnist. He was a Personal Tech writer for USA Today where he reviewed gadgets and consumer technology trends. Baig was also responsible for writing on the future of robotics.

== Education ==
Baig obtained his bachelor's degree in political science from York College and in 1982 received his MBA from Adelphi University.

== Career ==
Baig has worked at Business Week, U.S. News & World Report and Fortune Magazine. From 1978 to 1990, he worked for Fortune Magazine. Here he covered leisure industries and created Fortune's Products to Watch column. In 1990, Baig decided to work for U.S. News & World Report in Washington, D.C., as an associate editor where he was responsible for covering personal technology. He then worked for Business Week in New York, New York, and Washington, D.C., from 1993 to 1999. Here he was department editor and covered personal technology and personal finance. He left USA Today in 2019.

In 2007, Baig was one of only four journalists (alongside Steven Levy, Walt Mossberg, and David Pogue) provided with advance access to the first iPhone in order to review it. Baig currently serves as a tech writer for the AARP website and magazine.

== Publications ==
He has written a software book called Mac for Dummies. Baig and his colleague Paul McFedries co-wrote a 2022 edition of "iPad and iPad Pro : For Dummies.
