= DJ Cummerbund =

American musical artist

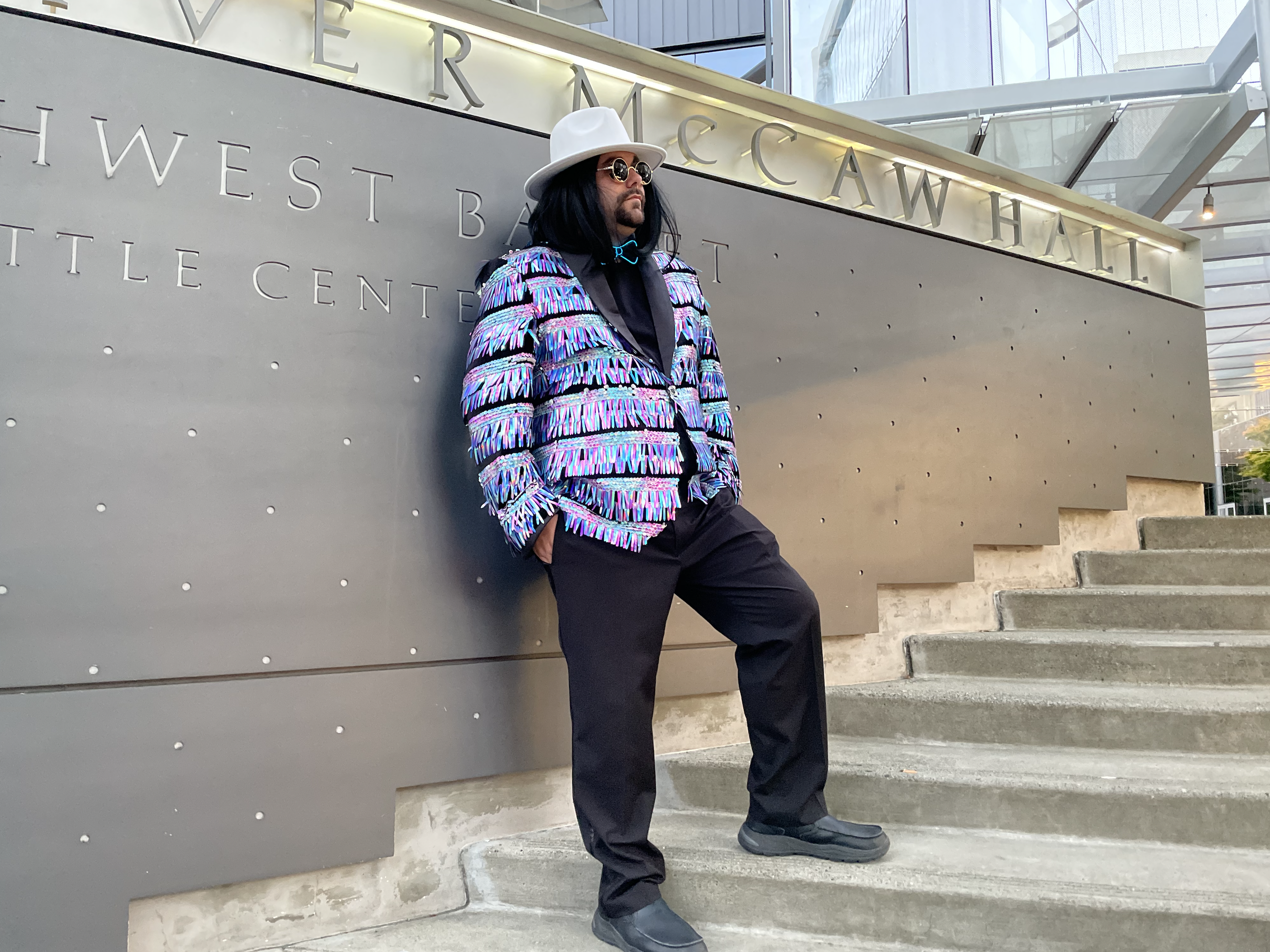
- DJ Cummerbund posing outside of McCaw Hall in Seattle, 2022

Background information
- Origin: Long Island, New York, U.S.
- Genres: Mashup, remix
- Occupations: DJ, producer
- Years active: 2014–present

DJ Cummerbund is an American mashup artist, DJ, and producer from Long Island, New York. Since 2014, he has released mashup songs that have attracted mainstream media attention, praise from musicians he's sampled, and hundreds of millions of views online. He is the recipient of a Webby Award and an MTV Video Music Award, and he performed as an opening act for the B-52s during their farewell tour and Las Vegas residencies.

== Career ==
DJ Cummerbund began uploading mashups to YouTube in 2014. His 2016 mashup Freaktender – combining Foo Fighters' "The Pretender" with Rick James' "Super Freak" – was praised by Foo Fighters, who briefly incorporated elements of it into live performances. Another widely circulated mashup blended Ozzy Osbourne's "Crazy Train" with Earth, Wind & Fire's "September." It was covered by several music outlets.

In 2020, Cummerbund won a Webby Award in the Video Remixes/Mashups category for "Play That Funky Music Rammstein", which combined Rammstein's "Du Hast" with Wild Cherry's "Play That Funky Music." His acceptance speech referenced professional wrestler Randy Savage, whose audio and video clips often appear in his work.

=== Notable collaborations ===
- With The B-52s: In 2021, Cummerbund's mashup "Shaxicula", a mix of the B-52s' "Love Shack," Britney Spears' "Toxic", and Rob Zombie's "Dragula" went viral on TikTok and won an MTV Video Music Award for Best Audio Mashup. Later that year, he collaborated with the B-52s, Recognition Music Group, and Frtyfve Records to release an officially licensed version of "Love Shack (DJ Cummerbund Tik Toxic Remix)". He subsequently joined the B-52s on their farewell tour as an opening act along with KC and The Sunshine Band and The Tubes, and he performed during their Las Vegas residencies between 2023 and 2025.
- With Alanis Morissette: In 2024, to promote her Triple Moon Tour with Joan Jett, DJ Cummerbund produced the mashup "Hate Myself for Loving You Oughta Know," combining Morissette's "You Oughta Know" with Joan Jett's "I Hate Myself for Loving You," and including a snippet of "I Love Rock 'n' Roll."

== Awards and nominations ==
List of awards and nominations received by DJ Cummerbund
Award	Year	Work	Category	Result	Ref.
2020 Webby Awards	2020	Play That Funky Music Rammstein	Video Remixes/Mashups	Won	
2021 MTV Video Music Awards	2021	Shaxicula	Best Audio Mashup	Won	
