= NewsBios =

Internet business

NewsBios is an Internet-based service that provides unauthorized biographies on business and financial reporters, editors, writers, producers, anchors, freelancers, and other journalists.

The Sunday New York Times described the service on October 5, 2014, comparing and contrasting the methods of NewsBios with the methods of professional journalists: “NewsBios employs techniques that journalists use: Doing web searches of people's backgrounds, reading their social media posts to learn more about them and drawing conclusions. The difference is that journalists generally notify and seek interviews with the subjects of profiles, whereas NewsBios promises to ‘never contact the journalists directly.”

The Columbia Journalism Review noted that NewsBios "compiles dossiers on journalists, scouring obituaries, social media, real-estate records, and past stories, and claims to turn up worldview-shaping experiences. The rub is in a disclaimer: NewsBios doesn’t verify the information found online."

== History ==
Among those journalists whose bios are sold most frequently are members of NewsBios's annual list of the 100 Most Influential Business and Financial Journalists, winners of its Business News Luminary Awards (NewsBios) and the 30 Under 30 list of successful young business journalists.

NewsBios aggregates and sifts information from more than 60 sources of public information and combines that research with its own analytics and proprietary databases. Among the core advantages of a NewsBio when compared with an authorized profile is the inclusion of biographical information that journalists do not wish the public to know.

This unauthorized information may include previous jobs that did not work out well, complaints pertaining to a journalist's reporting, personal life developments that may influence a reporter's news judgment and opinions writers and editors have expressed that reveal a bias.

In addition, because NewsBios has prepared more than 15,000 reporter dossiers over a period of two-and-a-half decades, NewsBios is able to put individual bios in perspective with professional standards in general.

NewsBios was founded in 1987 as FaxProfiles in Ridgewood, New Jersey. Its parent company, TJFR Group, Inc., was publisher of the TJFR Business News Reporter, a twice monthly print newsletter that tracked the activities of key financial journalists. The newsletter was published from 1987 to 2002. TJFR stands for The Journalist & Financial Reporting. Dean Rotbart, a former reporter and columnist with The Wall Street Journal, is the founder and executive editor.
