= Kara Swisher =

American technology business journalist (born 1962)

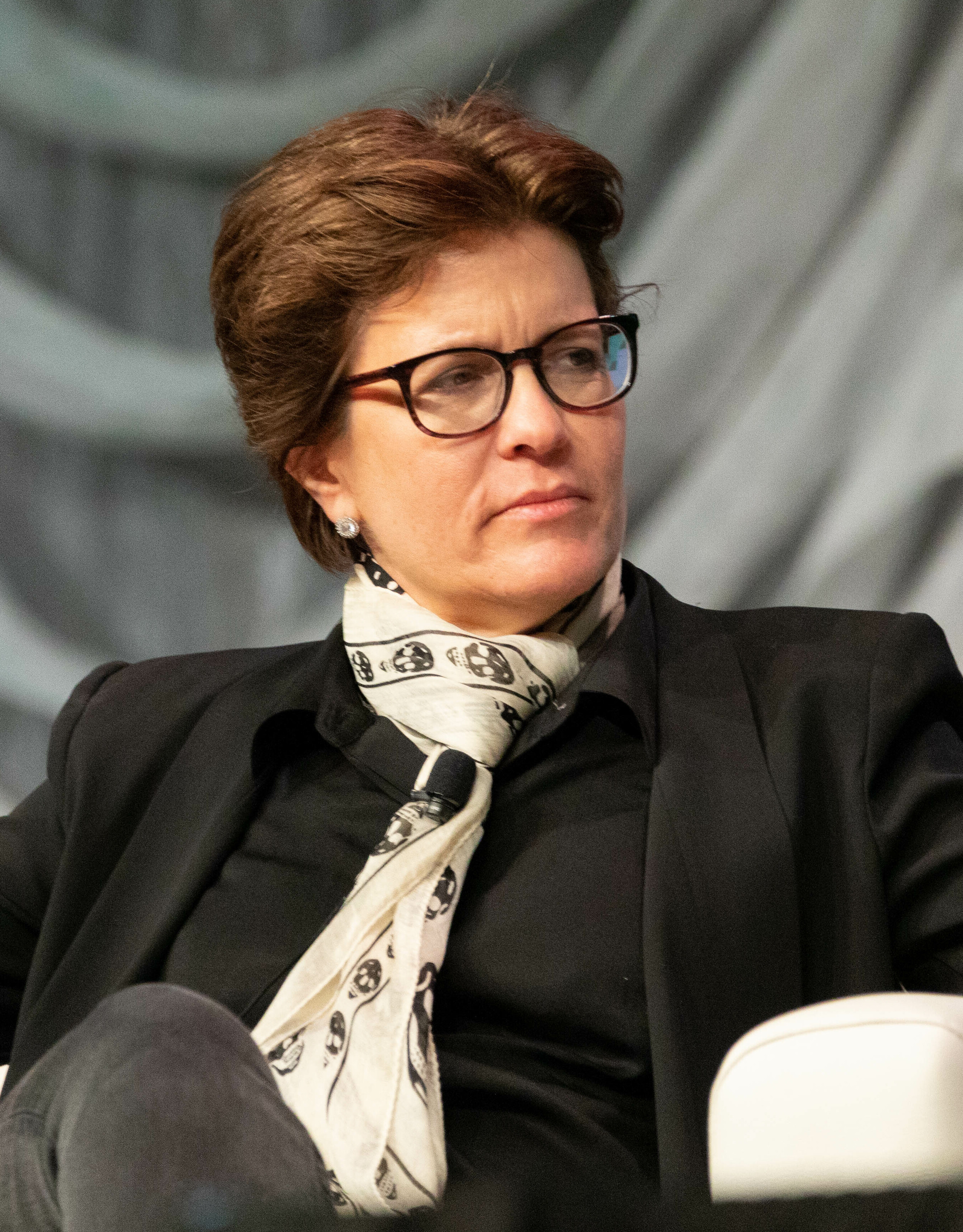
- Swisher at South by Southwest 2019
- Born: December 11, 1962 (age 63)
- Education: Georgetown University (BS); Columbia University (MS)
- Occupation: Journalist
- Years active: 1994–present
- Notable work: Co-founder of Recode
- Political party: Democratic
- Spouses: Megan Smith (m. 1999; div. 2017) Amanda Katz (m. 2020)
- Children: 4

Kara Anne Swisher (/ˈkɛərə/ KAIR-ə; born December 11, 1962) is an American journalist. She has covered the business of the internet since 1994. As of 2023, Swisher was a contributing editor at New York Magazine, the host of On with Kara Swisher, and co-host of the Pivot podcast.

In fall of 2026, she announced that she would be co-hosting a new podcast with politician Hillary Clinton on the 2026 midterm elections.

In 2014, she co-founded Vox Media's Recode with Walt Mossberg. From 2018 to 2022, she served as an opinion writer for The New York Times before returning to Vox Media. Her previous work includes reporting for The Wall Street Journal and The Washington Post, as well as co-creating All Things Digital and its conference.

== Early life and education ==
Swisher was born on December 11, 1962, and lived in Roslyn Harbor, Long Island, New York, until her father died when she was five years old. Her family then moved to Princeton, New Jersey, and she grew up there. In a 2021 interview with Bryan Elliott for Inc.'s Behind The Brand, Swisher said that as a child, she always wanted to work either in the military, with military intelligence, or with the CIA.

Swisher attended the Walsh School of Foreign Service (SFS) at Georgetown University in Washington, D.C. At Georgetown, she wrote for The Hoya, Georgetown's school newspaper, and then for the school's news magazine, The Georgetown Voice. During her sophomore and junior years, she interned at The Washington Post, which solidified her career in journalism. She obtained her undergraduate degree in 1984. In 1985, she graduated from Columbia University Graduate School of Journalism with an MS in journalism. She "spent some time" at Duke University studying misinformation and propaganda, which Swisher said were "always her area of study". Her studies helped Swisher gain an appreciation for: (1) how susceptible the Worldwide Web was to manipulation by bad actors; and (2) the need for safeguards, including government regulation, to prevent such manipulation.

== Early career ==
After graduating, Swisher first worked at the Washington City Paper in Washington, D.C.

== The Washington Post ==
Swisher returned to The Washington Post in 1986 as a news aide for the Style desk before becoming a reporter covering the local retail beat.

Swisher identifies her tenure at the Post as the period when she began extensively using technology, noting that she carried a "suitcase" cell phone during that time. She received national attention for covering AOL and the beginning of the dot-com era in the 1990s. While working for the business section of the paper, Swisher decided to leave to devote time to writing her first book, AOL.com: How Steve Case Beat Bill Gates, Nailed the Netheads, and Made Millions in the War for the Web, published in 1998. It was during this time that she first met Walt Mossberg, a veteran tech journalist who would become a close friend and co-owner of the AllThingsD blog.

== The Wall Street Journal ==
Swisher joined The Wall Street Journal in 1997, working from its bureau in San Francisco. She created and wrote Boom Town, a column devoted to the companies, personalities, and culture of Silicon Valley, which appeared on the front page of the Wall Street Journal's Marketplace section and online. During that time, she was cited as being the most influential reporter covering the internet by Industry Standard magazine.

In 2003, with her colleague Walt Mossberg, she launched the All Things Digital conference and later expanded it into a daily blog called AllThingsD.com. The conference featured interviews by Swisher and Mossberg of top technology executives including Bill Gates, Steve Jobs, and Larry Ellison.

== Recode ==
On January 1, 2014, Swisher and Mossberg struck out on their own with the Recode website, based in San Francisco. In the spring of 2014, they held the inaugural Code Conference near Los Angeles. Vox Media acquired the website in May 2015. A month later in June 2015, they launched Recode Decode, a weekly podcast in which Swisher interviews prominent figures in the technology space with Stewart Butterfield featured as the first guest.

In September 2018, Recode and Vox Media launched Pivot, a semi-weekly news commentary podcast co-hosted by Swisher and Scott Galloway. In April 2020, New York Magazine announced Pivot would be joining the magazine's properties, dropping the Recode branding, and Swisher would also join as editor-at-large. In May 2020, Swisher wrote on Twitter that she had not been involved in editing or assigning stories on Recode for many years.

== The New York Times ==
Swisher became a contributing Opinion writer at The New York Times in 2018, her writing being based on a career of "cover[ing] of the technology industry". She has written on topics that include Elon Musk, Kevin Systrom's departure from Instagram, when Google considered layers of censorship in order to reenter the Chinese market, and Ro Khanna's 10 principles in 2018 that were the origins for an internet Bill of Rights.

On September 21, 2020, the Times premiered Sway, a Salesforce-sponsored podcast, hosted by Swisher, to "bring listeners smart, substantive, ... revealing conversations... exposing the nitty-gritty of how power and influence really work...", a program in a semi-weekly format. The New York Times podcast webpage tagline for the program was, "A new podcast about power: who has it, who's been denied it and who dares defy it." Nancy Pelosi, then Speaker of the United States House of Representatives, was the first guest on the podcast. Subsequent guests included Jason Kilar, Jon Stewart, Samantha Bee, Monica Lewinsky, Elon Musk, Stacey Abrams, Bill Gates, and Brené Brown, among various others.

In June 2022, Joe Pompeo reported in Vanity Fair that Swisher would be ending her activities at The New York Times—Opinion writing, Sway podcast, and weekly newsletter—to "pursue a new project" with Vox Media, where she had already been splitting time (writing for their New York magazine, and cohosting the Pivot podcast with Scott Galloway).

== Vox Media ==
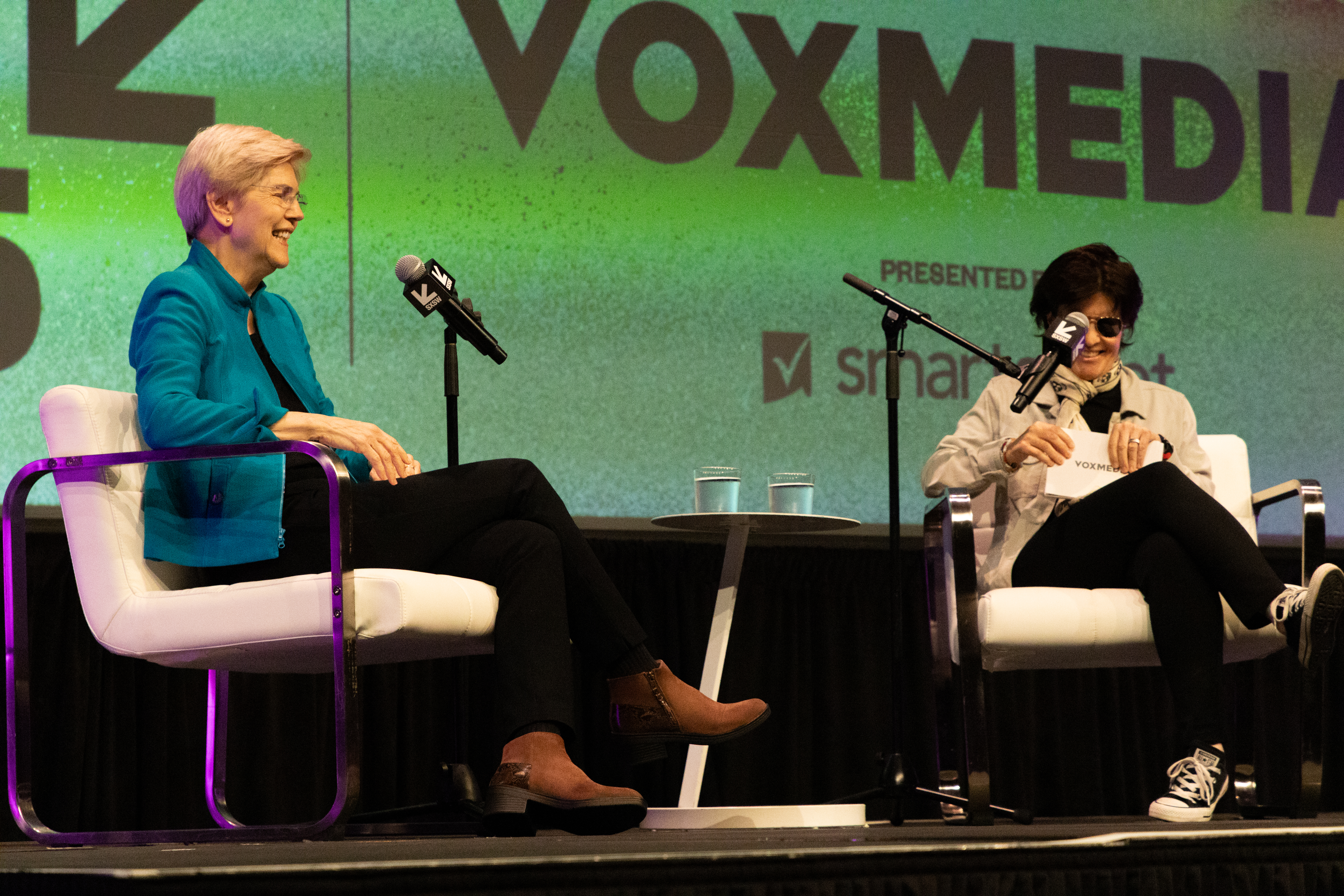
Swisher with Senator Elizabeth Warren at SXSW 2025

Swisher became an editor-at-large at New York Magazine and the host of On with Kara Swisher in September 2022. The first episode of 'On' premiered September 26.

== Other activities ==
Swisher was a judge in Mayor Michael Bloomberg's NYC BigApps competition in New York. She told Rolling Stone writer Claire Hoffman: "A lot of these people I cover are babies," Swisher said. "I always call them papier-mâché–they just wilt."

Swisher appeared as herself in a 2015 episode of the HBO show Silicon Valley.

Swisher wrote of her experiences working for The McLaughlin Group in a 2018 Slate article, in which she alleged that host John McLaughlin abused staff and sexually harassed women. Reflecting on his death from prostate cancer in 2016, she wrote, "I'm so glad he's dead. Seriously, I'm glad he's dead. He was a jackass. He deserved it."

In January 2019, Swisher told people who disapproved of a Gillette advertisement after the January 2019 Lincoln Memorial confrontation, "... to all you aggrieved folks who thought this Gillette ad was too much bad-men-shaming, after we just saw it come to life with those awful kids and their fetid smirking harassing that elderly man on the Mall: Go __ yourselves." Citing Swisher's comment as an example of how inaccurate many media accounts of the story had been, Caitlin Flanagan of The Atlantic Monthly observed, "You know the left has really changed in this country when you find its denizens... lionizing the social attitudes of the corporate monolith Procter & Gamble." Swisher apologized in a tweet two days later.

In 2021 and 2023, Swisher hosted the official companion podcast for the third and fourth seasons of HBO's TV series Succession. In 2024, she received criticism for her book "Burn Book: A Tech Love Story," with critics saying that it was "anti-worker."

In 2025, she played herself in the Apple TV program, The Morning Show.

In 2026, she played herself in the film The Devil Wears Prada 2.

=== Plan to run for Mayor of San Francisco ===
In 2016, she announced that she planned to run for mayor of San Francisco as a Democrat in 2023. She was seen as likely to run on a "highly progressive" platform with a focus on more housing, legalizing marijuana, and new labor laws for the "on-demand" workforce that dominated (and still dominates) San Francisco.

We all yammer about politicians and how bad things are, and I think it important that we stop bellyaching and act if we want change. Also this whole election cycle has struck a chord in me that I have always thought about, related to professional politicians and how we need to shift thinking about who should serve and the duty of citizens to be, you know, citizens. There is an important and necessary role for good government and I hate this wholesale tearing down of it. Also the increasing divide between tech sector and the city is something that I think a lot about. Not that I have solutions as yet.

== Personal life ==
Swisher married engineer and technology executive Megan Smith in Marin County in 1999 at a time when same-sex marriage was not legal in California. They had an additional legal wedding ceremony in 2003 in Niagara Falls, Canada, in 2004 as part of the San Francisco 2004 same-sex weddings, and another in San Francisco in November 2008 in advance of California Proposition 8, which declared same-sex marriages invalid in California. Swisher and Smith had two sons, Louis and Alexander. They separated in 2014, and were divorced as of 2017.

Swisher married Amanda Katz on October 3, 2020, with whom she had two children.

In 2011, Swisher suffered a "mini-stroke" while on a flight to Hong Kong, where she was soon hospitalized and put on anticoagulant medication. She wrote about the experience in a remembrance of Luke Perry, after a stroke led to his death in 2019.

Swisher is known for wearing dark aviator sunglasses even while indoors, explaining "I have light sensitivity a little; I just don't like bright lights. She grew up Catholic and identifies as agnostic.

== Bibliography ==
She is the author of several books. In 2021, it was announced that she signed a two-book memoir deal with Simon & Schuster. The first, Burn Book: A Tech Love Story, was released in February 2024.

- aol.com: How Steve Case Beat Bill Gates, Nailed the Netheads, and Made Millions in the War for the Web. New York, NY: Random House International, 1999. ISBN 9780812931914, OCLC 313499003
- With Lisa Dickey, There Must Be a Pony in Here Somewhere: The AOL Time Warner Debacle and the Quest for the Digital Future New York, NY: Three Rivers Press, 2003. ISBN 9781400049646, OCLC 58726021
- Burn Book: A Tech Love Story. New York, NY: Simon & Schuster, 2024. ISBN 9781982163891, OCLC 1393241009

== Awards and recognition ==
- 2011 Gerald Loeb Award for Blogging for "Liveblogging Yahoo Earnings Calls in 2010 (They're Funny!)"
- 2020 Fast Company Queer 50
- 2021 Fast Company Queer 50
- 2021 American Academy of Arts and Sciences Elected member
