= All Things Digital =

Technology news website

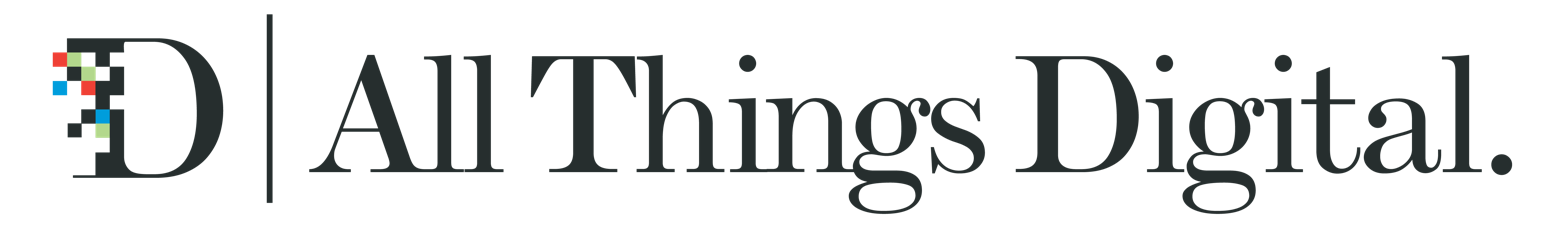
- Website type: Technology news and analysis
- Dissolved: December 31, 2013
- Headquarters: San Francisco, California, U.S.
- Owner: Dow Jones
- Creators: Kara Swisher; Walt Mossberg
- Website: allthingsd.com
- Commercial: Yes
- Launched: April 16, 2007
- Current status: Inactive

All Things Digital (also known as AllThingsD.com) was an American online publication that specialized in technology and startup company news, analysis and coverage. It was founded in 2007 by Kara Swisher and Walt Mossberg, as an extension of the annual meetings D: All Things Digital Conference.

All Things Digital was a wholly owned subsidiary of Dow Jones & Company, and was a member of The Wall Street Journal's Digital Network, which includes WSJ.com, MarketWatch, Barron's, and SmartMoney.

In September 2013, Swisher and Mossberg failed to renew their agreement with Dow Jones. On January 1, 2014, Swisher and Mossberg introduced their own site, Re/code, based in San Francisco, California.

== Site content ==
AllThingsD.com expanded upon the All Things Digital conference, which was launched in 2003 by Swisher and Mossberg. While the conference quickly became popular and prestigious among the business and technology communities, the number of attendees was limited to approximately 500 people. The web site was set up to "open the conversation to everyone." Although the site operates year-round, during each "D" Conference it offers comprehensive and direct coverage of all events and presentations

AllThingsD.com focused on news, analysis and opinion on technology, the Internet and media, but considered itself a fusion of diverse media styles, different topics, formats and sources. Initially, the two main features of the site were Kara Swisher's BoomTown blog, and Walt Mossberg's technology product review columns from the Wall Street Journal. Since then, the site had expanded greatly in personnel and focus. Although most of the staff were based in San Francisco, many contributors, including Mossberg, worked primarily in other parts of the United States.

All Things Digital utilized Livefyre to permit readers to comment on news stories.

In September 2022, Swisher stated that most of All Things Digital's content (including video interviews with Mark Zuckerberg and Peter Thiel early in their careers) had become unavailable, despite an agreement with the WSJ and News Corp to preserve it after her and Mossberg's departure.

=== Featured writers ===
AllThingsD.com featured nine different writers at the time of closure, where each had their own section of the site, as well as a separate category for other featured writers, both within and outside of the publication:

- Kara Swisher's BoomTown: Swisher's coverage of digital issues which originally appeared under the same title in the Wall Street Journal, before being published in AllThingsD.com.
- Walt Mossberg's reviews and personal technology column, also originally run in The Wall Street Journal.
- Katherine Boehret's Digital Solution: a review of consumer technology.
- Peter Kafka's MediaMemo: media and technology coverage.
- Liz Gannes' NetworkEffect: reporting with a focus on social networking and the intersection of entertainment and technology.
- Ina Fried's Mobilized: coverage of wireless issues and devices.
- Tricia Duryee's eMoney: reportage on earnings, transactions and financial statistics that move the technology industry.
- Arik Hesseldahl's NewEnterprise: articles and entries concerning the online business world, covering both hardware and software.
- Voices: a portion of AllThingsD.com which featured posts by the site's staff writers, pieces from other Dow Jones properties, and reporters and bloggers from all over the web.

== Conferences ==
AllThingsD.com also hosted content concerning its D Conferences; besides the annual main event in late Spring, in December 2010 they hosted D: Dive Into Mobile, the first brand extension of the conference in which representatives from leading mobile device and software producers were interviewed by members of AllThingsD.

== In popular culture ==
The AllThingsD logo can be spotted during the Season 2 opening credits of the HBO series Silicon Valley, before being taken down and replaced by the Re/code logo as the intro animation progresses.
