= Walt Mossberg =

American technology journalist (born 1947)

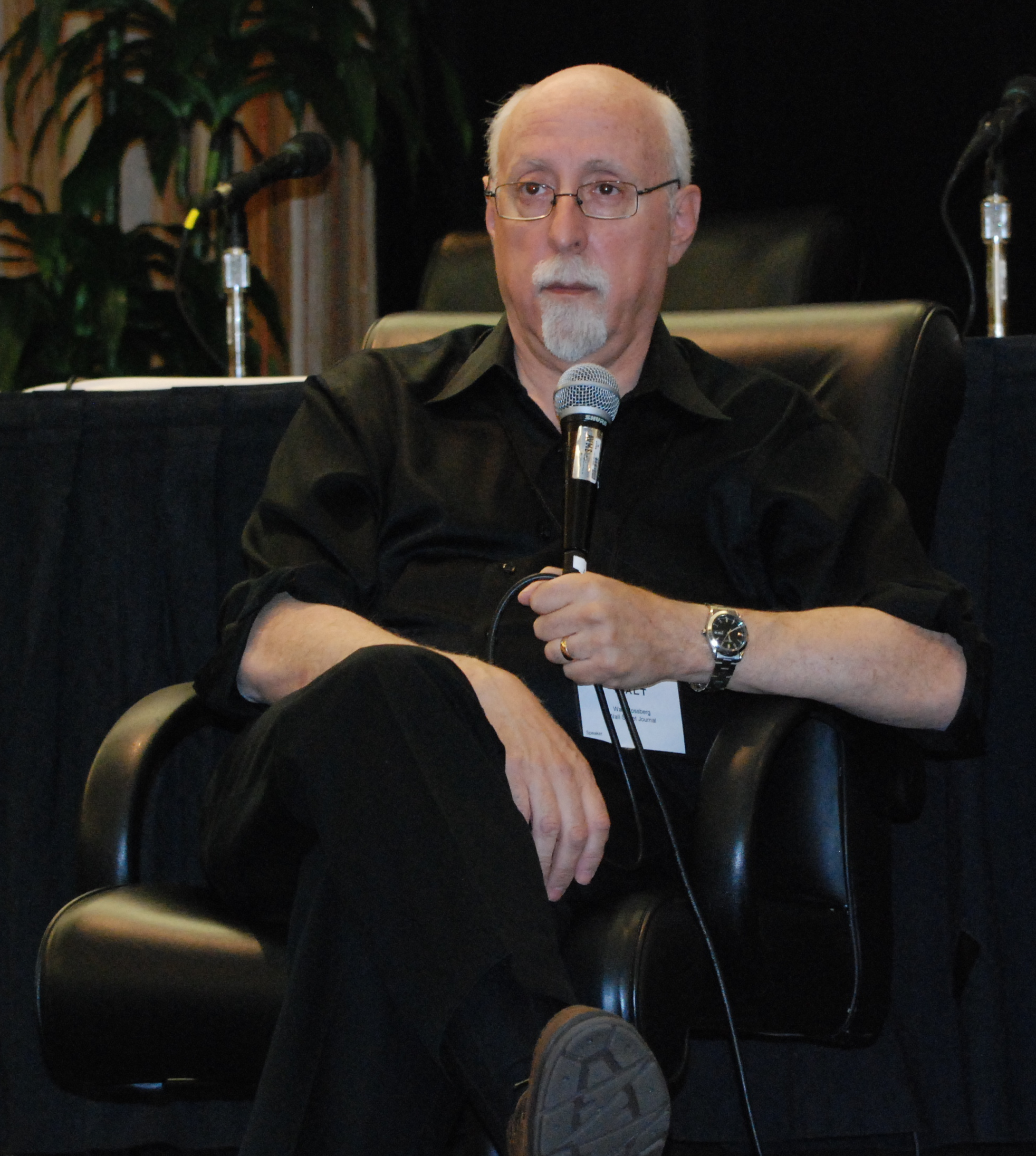
- Mossberg in 2009
- Born: March 27, 1947 (age 79); Warwick, Rhode Island, U.S.
- Education: Brandeis University; Columbia University
- Occupations: Columnist, journalist
- Website: www.theverge.com/users/WaltMossberg/posts

Walter S. Mossberg (born March 27, 1947) is an American retired technology journalist and moderator.

From 1991 through 2013, he was the principal technology columnist for The Wall Street Journal. He also co-founded AllThingsD, Recode and the D and Code Conferences. From 2015 to 2017, Mossberg was Executive Editor of The Verge and Editor-at-Large of Recode, web sites owned by Vox Media. Mossberg wrote a weekly column for both and also had a weekly podcast, Ctrl-Walt-Delete. Mossberg was also co-executive producer of the annual Code Conference. He retired in July 2017.

Dow Jones announced on September 19, 2013, that Mossberg would leave The Wall Street Journal as part of the breakup with AllThingsD by the end of the year. AllThingsD was a technology conference and web site owned by Dow Jones but created and operated by Mossberg and Kara Swisher. Along with other reporters from AllThingsD, Mossberg and Swisher started a new media site called Recode in 2014, which was acquired by Vox Media in 2015.

In April 2017, Mossberg announced his plans to retire. He is on the board of The News Literacy Project.

== Early life and education ==
Mossberg, a native of Warwick, Rhode Island, is a graduate of Pilgrim High School, Brandeis University and the Columbia University Graduate School of Journalism.

== Career ==
Mossberg was a reporter and editor at The Wall Street Journal from 1970 until the end of 2013. He was based in the Journal's Washington, D.C., office, where he spent 18 years covering national and international affairs before turning his attention to technology. Mossberg's Personal Technology column appeared every Thursday from 1991 through 2013. He also edited the Digital Solution column each Wednesday (authored by his colleague, Katherine Boehret), and wrote the Mossberg's Mailbox column on Thursdays. He appeared weekly on CNBC, and in web videos, and was on numerous times a guest on the Charlie Rose Show, airing on PBS stations.

In 1999, Mossberg became the first technology writer to receive the Loeb award for Commentary. In 2001, he won the World Technology Award for Media and Journalism and received an honorary Doctorate of Law from the University of Rhode Island. Mossberg is widely regarded as one of the most influential writers on information technology. In 2004, in a lengthy profile, Wired called him "The Kingmaker", saying "few reviewers have held so much power to shape an industry's successes and failures." A 2007 profile in the New Yorker was entitled "Everyone Listens to Walter Mossberg" and declared him "someone whose judgment can ratify years of effort or sink the show."

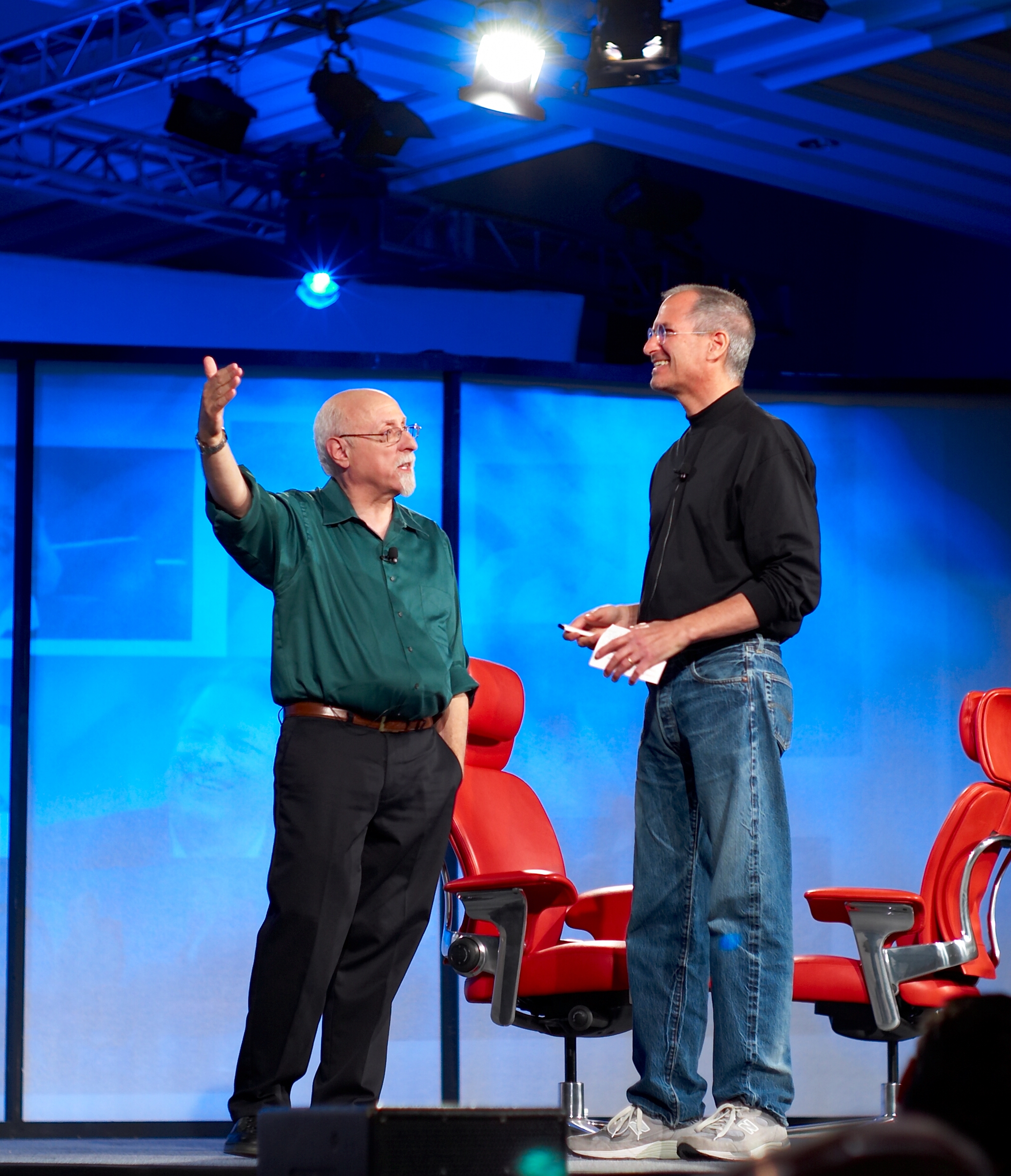
Mossberg (left) with Steve Jobs at All Things Digital 5 in 2007

In 2017, he received the Loeb Award's Lifetime Achievement Award.

In partnership with his fellow Journal columnist Kara Swisher, Mossberg created, produced and hosted the Journal's annual All Things Digital conference in Carlsbad, California, in which well-known technology leaders, such as Bill Gates, Steve Jobs and Elon Musk, appeared on stage without prepared remarks, or slides, and were interviewed by the two columnists. That conference concept continues today in the form of their Code Conference. Mossberg and Swisher also co-edited the All Things Digital web site, which included his columns, her blog and other posts.

On May 30, 2007, Mossberg and Swisher conducted a historic, unrehearsed, joint onstage interview with Steve Jobs and Bill Gates. Mossberg was one of only four journalists (alongside Steven Levy, Ed Baig, and David Pogue) provided with advance access to the first iPhone in order to review it.

In September 2013, by mutual agreement, Dow Jones & Co. and Mossberg and Swisher announced they would not renew the contract with AllThingsD, and that Mossberg would be leaving The Wall Street Journal by the end of the year.

On January 2, 2014, Mossberg and Swisher launched Recode, a tech website. The website was acquired by Vox Media in May 2015 in an all-stock deal.

On April 7, 2017, Mossberg announced his planned retirement, which occurred on July 3 of that year. "It just seems like the right time to step away", Mossberg wrote in Recode. "I'm ready for something new." His final column was published on May 25, 2017. His final Code Conference was May 30 – June 1, and his retirement podcast, performed live in New York, was on June 9.
