= Pivot (podcast) =

Hosted by Kara Swisher and Scott Galloway

Pivot is an American podcast hosted by technology journalist Kara Swisher and Professor Scott Galloway. Together they discuss popular culture, business, politics, media, and technology.

The podcast was created in 2018 by New York magazine and Vox, and releases content every Tuesday and Friday.

The hosts have done two national tours of the podcast.

They have discussed the medium of podcasting as critical independent journalism, and regularly comment on the commercial side of podcasting.

In fall of 2026 Swisher announced she would be doing a mini-series offshoot podcast on the midterm elections with Hillary Clinton.

== Rankings and awards ==
The podcast was ranked #2 by Rephonic in US podcasts for news commentary, and was included in the 2025 TIME 100 "Best Podcasts" list.

The pod won a 2026 Webby award for best news and tech podcast.
