= Dere Evil Exe =

2018 video game

DERE EVIL EXE
- Developer: Darius Immanuel Guerrero
- Publisher: AppSir Games
- Platforms: Android, iOS, Windows
- Release: May 29, 2018
- Genres: Masocore platform, horror game
- Mode: Single-player

Dere Evil Exe (stylized as DERE EVIL EXE) is a platform horror video game developed by Darius Immanuel Guerrero and published by AppSir Games. It was released on May 29, 2018, on iOS, where it is adware with the option for an ad-free purchase, July 2, 2018, for Android and on July 3, 2018, for Windows as a paid game. A standalone sequel to previous indie games Sorority Rites and The Last Yandere, and a remake of the freeware game DERE EXE, the game is based on creepypasta stories about retro games, and has a self-aware story that breaks the fourth wall. Nominally a masocore fantasy platformer in which the player controls a knight character, Knightly, on a quest to save a princess, the game's rules are skewed, and the player is soon warned not to trust the game's developer messages or its assistant AI, AIDE (Artificial Intelligence for Dere Exe). The game received mixed reviews from critics, who praised the story, but were split on whether the gameplay was of high quality. A sequel to the game DERE Vengeance was released on September 19th, 2023.

== Development ==
Developer Darius Guerrero is based in the Philippines. initially became a video game developer because his girlfriend, Daphne Ayala, enjoyed games and he wanted to surprise her with a game in which she was the main character. They began making games together, deciding to make a series of interconnected games with a deep story based on conspiracy theories, but simple gameplay, one of which was DERE EVIL EXE. The inspiration for the game came from the Polybius urban legend about a 1981 arcade game used for government experiments, as well as an obscure website, Annie's Road.

The game's difficulty emerged from the desire to troll people who were playtesting. Guerrero called the biggest challenge testing the game himself due to its high difficulty. He said that he was pleased at the game's reception and expected to continue developing games for "decades".

== Reception ==
Sarah Saunders of TouchArcade gave the game a perfect score in her review, calling it her "go-to" for weeks despite the game's difficulty. Describing it as an "excellent and challenging 2D platformer", she noted the game was not for easily frustrated players, and that she had died hundreds of times. She stated her desire for the developer's previous games to be playable on iOS, but recommended it to players who enjoyed meta-humor or meta-horror. Jon Mundy of Pocket Gamer rated the game lower, calling it "bizarre, frustrating, sinister, and faintly exhausting". Describing it as "Super Meat Boy meets Portal", he criticized its story as "perhaps a little too smart and knowing for its own good", calling it akin to a snarky teen and saying it had too many red herrings. He also called the platforming itself "something of a mixed bag", criticizing its virtual controls and ultimately describing it as "interesting rather than irresistible".

Iain Harris of Rock Paper Shotgun said that DERE EVIL EXE had a "sense of meta-horror and fun", saying that it was at its best "when it subverts the hero and damsel in distress archetypes", citing AIDE's praise of the player early on in the game, which shifts to being a helpless outsider. He summed up the game's "subversion and reflection on the genre" as "thrilling".

The game received an honorable mention at the 2020 Webby Awards.

== Sequel ==
In 2020, DERE EVIL EXE received an endless runner sequel, HopBound, set in the same universe.
