= Recode =

American technology news website

- Website type: Technology news
- Owner: Vox Media
- Creators: Kara Swisher; Walt Mossberg
- Key people: Kara Swisher (editor-at-large); Peter Kafka (executive editor)
- Website: www.vox.com/recode
- Commercial: Yes
- Launched: January 2, 2014; 12 years ago
- Current status: Redirects to vox.com/technology

Recode (stylized as recode; formerly Re/code) was a technology news website that focused on the business of Silicon Valley. Walt Mossberg and Kara Swisher founded it in January 2014, after they left Dow Jones and the similar website they had previously co-founded, All Things Digital. Vox Media acquired Recode in May 2015 and, in May 2019, the Recode website was integrated into Vox. On March 6, 2023, Vox media announced that in order to make the various Vox sub brands less confusing to its readers, it was retiring the Recode brand but would continue its mission to explain complex issues around technology to its readers under the unified Vox brand.

== History ==
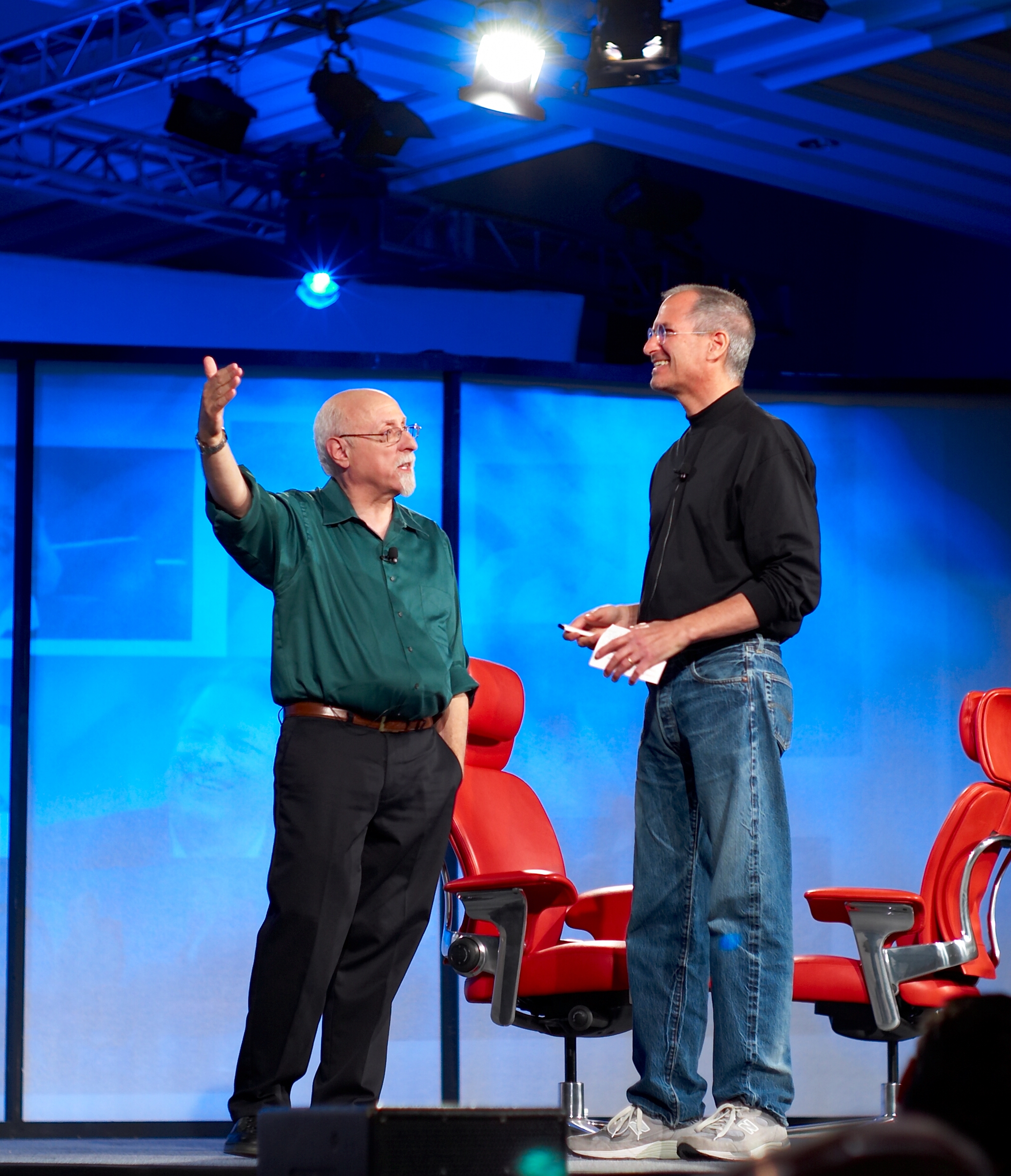
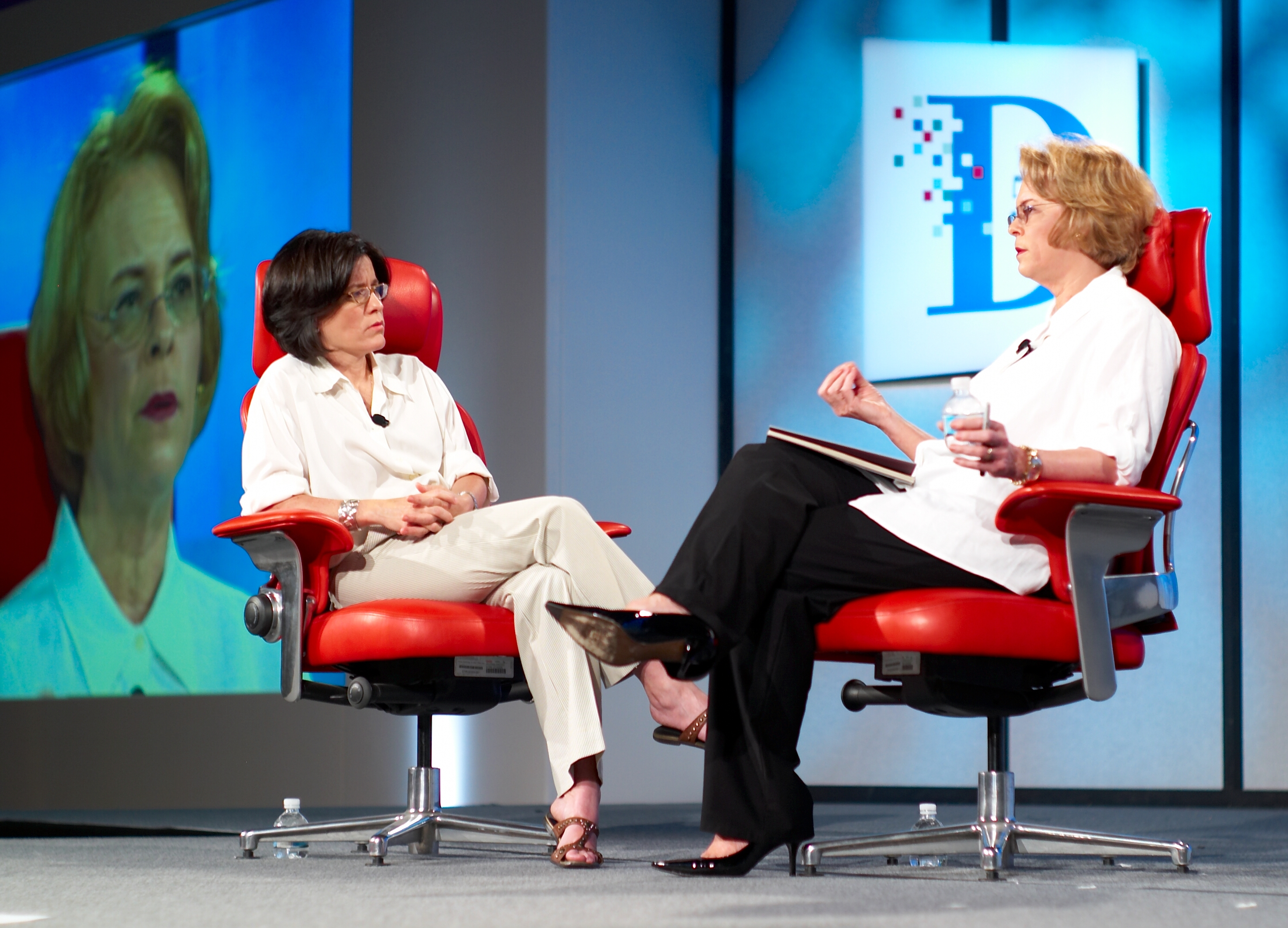
Left: Mossberg with Steve Jobs, 2007
Right: Swisher interviews Ann Moore, 2007

In September 2013, technology journalists Walt Mossberg and Kara Swisher left All Things Digital, the technology news site they had founded and developed for Dow Jones and News Corp. Mossberg left The Wall Street Journal at the end of the year, leaving behind a popular, weekly technology column. The two launched their new, independent technology news website, Recode, on January 2, 2014. Its holding company, Revere Digital, received minority investments from NBCUniversal and Terry Semel's Windsor Media. The total investment was estimated between US$10 and 15 million. Mossberg and Swisher held the company's majority stake and noted its comfortable financial stance. Recode also provided breaking technology coverage for NBCUniversal, and received video resources and exposure in return via a formal partnership. Mossberg saw the investment as an opportunity to implement new ways of covering the technology field, and planned to add six employees on technology policy and mobile beats. The CNBC partnership also explored new advertising efforts and shared office space. At launch, the 23-person team included all former members of All Things Digital. The staff also received equity in the company.

Mossberg and Swisher planned to continue their prominent, annual All Things Digital conference, which they renamed the "Code" conference and scheduled for the same time and location: late May at Terranea Resort in Rancho Palos Verdes, California. Recode also kept plans to continue their separate mobile and media conferences. CNBC became a partner in these conferences. A part-time team of 12 employees runs the conferences.

The site developed a reputation for breaking tech industry news but ultimately did not reach the level of popularity it expected, with just 1.5 million regular monthly visitors. Vox Media acquired the website in May 2015 in a move that The New York Times described as a reflection of tumult in online technology journalism. Vox purchased all of the company's stock, but the details of the transaction were not released. At the time of the acquisition, Recode had 44 employees and three additional employees by contract. They were expected to join Vox. Mossberg and Swisher planned to stay with the website. The two were impressed with Vox Media's audience reach. Vox's technology news website, The Verge, had eight times the traffic, in comparison. The scopes of the two sites were not expected to overlap with Recode's emphasis on technology industry business and The Verge's on "being a new kind of culture publication". An internal study found a three percent overlap in content between the two sites. Recode started publishing a podcast in July 2015 called Recode Decode. The podcast won "Tech Podcast of the Year" as well as "Podcast of the Year" at the 2019 Adweek Podcast Awards.

On May 8, 2016, Recode relaunched with a new design under editor-in-chief Dan Frommer. In May 2019, Recode was integrated into Vox Media's flagship website, Vox, becoming the column Recode by Vox.

== Content ==
As continued from All Things Digital, Recode focuses on technology and digital media news, particularly pertaining to the business of Silicon Valley. The site also reviews new enterprises, and consumer hardware and software, and conducts original reports.
