= Dodo (disambiguation) =

The dodo is an extinct flightless bird that was endemic to the island of Mauritius.

Dodo or Dodos may also refer to:

== Publications ==
- The Dodo (magazine), a satirical humor magazine published by cadets at the United States Air Force Academy
- The Dodo (website), an American online publisher focused on animals and animal rights issues
- Dodo, an 1893 novel by E. F. Benson
- A secret American government agency in The Rise and Fall of D.O.D.O., a 2017 novel by Neal Stephenson and Nicole Galland

== Music ==
=== Bands ===
- The Dodos, an American indie rock band
- Dodo and the Dodos, a Danish pop band

=== Songs ===
- "Dodo" a song by David Bowie from the 1974 album Diamond Dogs
- "Dodo", a song by Genesis from the 1981 album Abacab
- "Dodo", a song by Dave Matthews from the 2003 album Some Devil
- "Dodo 1", a song by Stromae from the 2010 album Cheese
- "The Dodo", a song by Bad Religion from the 2002 album Punk Rock Songs

== Film and television ==
- DoDo, The Kid from Outer Space, a 1960s animated series
- Dodo, a 2022 film directed by Panos H. Koutras

== People ==
- Dodoth people, an ethnic group in Uganda also known as Dodos
- Dodo (name), a list of people with the given name or surname
- Dodo (nickname), a list
- Dodo (painter), German painter Dörte Clara Wolff (1907–1998)
- Carol Cheng, Hong Kong actress and host nicknamed "Do Do"
- Dodo Marmarosa, American musician from Pennsylvania

== Fictional characters ==
- Dodo (Alice's Adventures in Wonderland)
- Gogo Dodo, in the animated series Tiny Toon Adventures
- Dodo Chaplet, from the TV series Doctor Who
- Yoyo Dodo, in the 1938 animated short film Porky in Wackyland

== Other uses ==
- Dodo (Biblical name), three individuals mentioned in the Bible
- Dodo, Ohio, a community in the United States
- Mount Dodo, or Mount Dodogamine, Japan
- Dodo Services, an Australian telecommunications, energy and insurance company
- A beer produced by Brasseries de Bourbon on Réunion Island
- Dodo (automobile company), an American manufacturer of the DODO cyclecar in 1912
- Fried plantain, called "dodo" in Nigeria
- Dodo Pizza, a Russian pizzeria chain

== See also ==
- Dodo Club, children's wing of the Durrell Wildlife Conservation Trust
- Do-Do ChestEze, an over-the-counter pharmaceutical
- Fais do-do, a Cajun dance party
- Widodo
