= Vox Media =

American digital media company

Vox Media Group, LLC
- Formerly: Vox Media, LLC
- Type: Subsidiary
- Industry: Mass media
- Predecessors: SportsBlogs, Inc.; Group Nine Media, Inc.; Vox Media, Inc.
- Founded: November 1, 2011; 15 years ago
- Founders: Jim Bankoff; Trei Brundrett
- Successor: NowThis Media Group, LLC; VM Publishing, LLC
- Headquarters: 85 Broad Street; New York, NY 10004; U.S.
- Key people: Jim Bankoff (CEO)
- Brands: Grub Street; Intelligencer; New York; The Cut; The Strategist; Vox; Vulture
- Owner: James Murdoch
- Parent: Lupa Systems, LLC
- Divisions: New York magazine; Vox website; Vox Media podcast network
- Website: voxmedia.com

Vox Media Group, LLC (VM Group) is an American mass media company founded in Washington, D.C. with operational headquarters in Lower Manhattan, New York City. The company was established in November, 2011 by CEO Jim Bankoff and Trei Brundrett to encompass SB Nation (a sports blog network founded in 2003 by Tyler Bleszinski, Markos Moulitsas, and Jerome Armstrong) and The Verge (a technology news website launched alongside Vox Media). Bankoff had been the CEO for SB Nation since 2009.

Vox Media has owned numerous editorial brands, most prominently The Verge, Polygon, SB Nation, Eater, and Vox. With the acquisition of New York Media in September 2019, New York joined the company with its further incorporates the websites Intelligencer, The Cut, Vulture, The Strategist, Curbed, and Grub Street. After the acquisition of Group Nine Media in February 2022, the company gained The Dodo, NowThis, PopSugar, Thrillist, and Seeker. Recode was integrated into Vox, Seeker into The Verge, while Racked was shut down, and NowThis was spun off.

The company's lines of business has included Concert, Vox Creative, Vox Entertainment, Vox Media Studios, and the Vox Media Podcast Network. As of 2020, the company operated additional offices in San Francisco, Chicago, Los Angeles, Austin, and London. In June 2010, the network featured over 300 sites with over 400 paid writers. As of November 2023, Comscore ranks Vox Media 35th-most popular media company among users from the United States. Vox Media's brands are built on Concert, a marketplace for advertising, and WordPress.

In May 2025, Vox Media sold the gaming website Polygon to Valnet. In May 2026, James Murdoch's Lupa Systems acquired the Vox website, the New York magazine, and Vox Media's podcast network. A month later in June 2026, Penske Media Corporation (PMC), which previously owned 20% of Vox Media, acquired the remaining assets of the company. PMC then combined its Vox Media publishing brands with their existing publishing portfolio as a new subsidiary called PMX. In July 2026, it was announced that the Vox Media brand would be retained for the part of the company purchased by Lupa Systems as a subsidiary.

== History ==
=== Background in sports media ===
Tyler Bleszinski, a freelance writer, established Athletics Nation in 2003 as a sports blog that sought to cover the baseball team Oakland Athletics from a fan's perspective. The blog quickly became popular, becoming the second-most popular site on the Blogads network, after Daily Kos. Bleszinski, together with Daily Kos creator Markos Moulitsas and political strategist Jerome Armstrong, then established the sports blog network SB Nation around Athletics Nation in 2005. The popularity of the site led to other sports blogs being incorporated. SB Nation hired former AOL executive Jim Bankoff as an advisor in 2008 to assist in its growth. He was promoted to chief executive officer (CEO) in January 2009. He showed interest in SB Nation's goal of building a network of niche-oriented sports websites. By February 2009, the SB Nation network contained 185 blogs, and in November 2010, Comscore estimated that the site had attracted 5.8 million unique visitors. The 208% increase in unique visitors over November 2009 made SB Nation the fastest-growing sports website the company tracked at the time.

=== Continued growth and expansion into other content areas ===
Former logo, used until November 2019

In 2011, Bankoff hired a number of former writers from AOL's technology blog Engadget, including former editor-in-chief Joshua Topolsky, to build a new technology-oriented website in the same network as SB Nation. These writers had originally left AOL following a series of conflicts between Topolsky and Michael Arrington, the author of TechCrunch (which AOL had previously acquired), and the leak of an internal training document that outlined a content strategy for AOL's blogs that prioritized profitability. Bankoff felt that a technology-oriented website would complement SB Nation due to their overlapping demographics. The Verge was launched on November 1, 2011, with Topolsky as editor-in-chief. Alongside this launch, Bankoff and Trei Brundrett created Vox Media as the parent company for both SB Nation and The Verge. The previous parent shell to SB Nation, SportsBlogs, Inc., was converted into Vox Media, Inc. for this purpose. Brundrett, who had been with SB Nation since 2006, became Vox Media's vice president of products and technology, and later chief product officer.

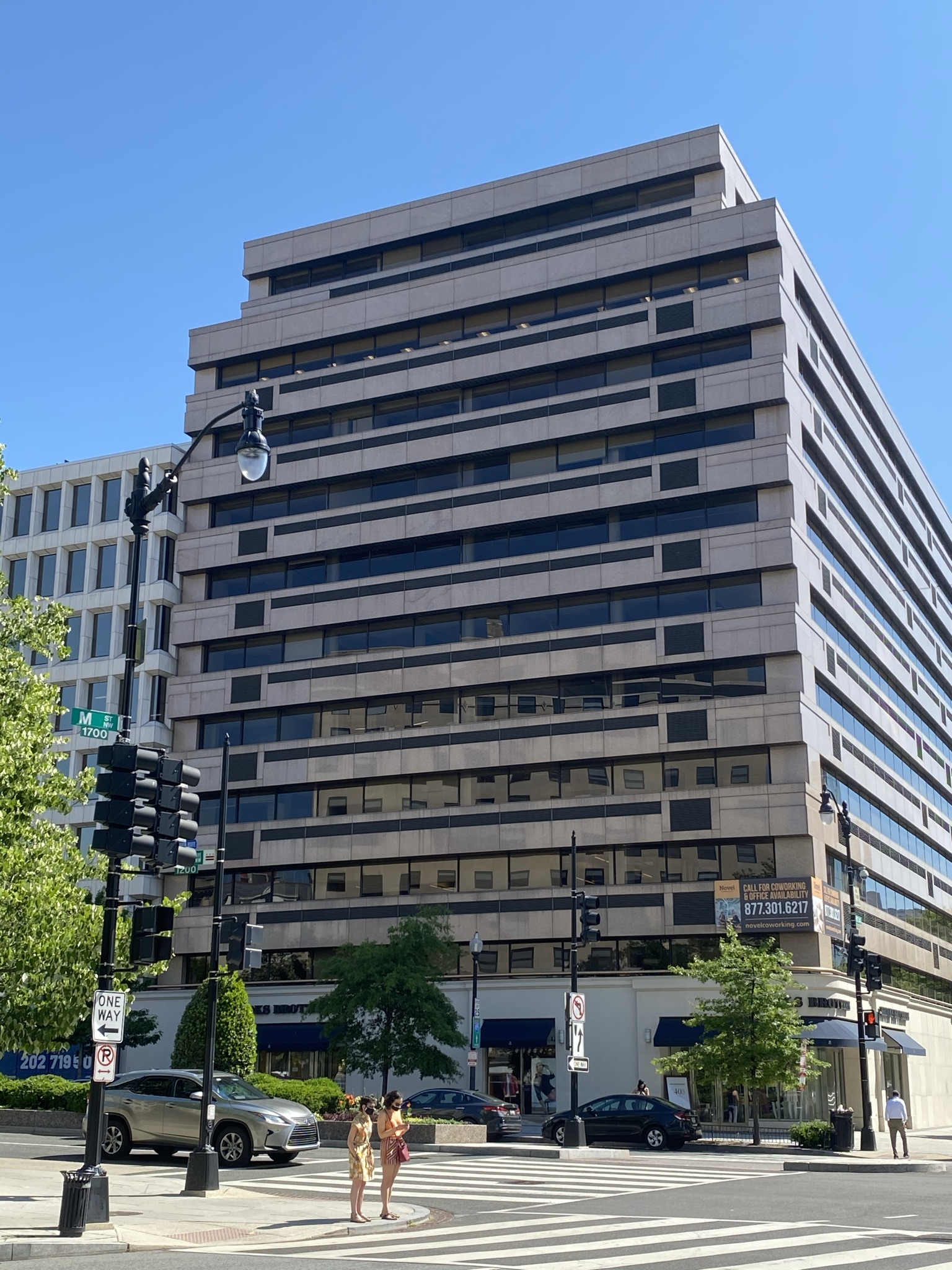
Office building 1201 Connecticut Avenue in Washington, D.C.

In 2012, Vox Media launched a video gaming website, Polygon, led by former Joystiq editor Christopher Grant. In November 2013, Vox Media acquired Curbed Network, which consisted of the real-estate blog network Curbed, the food blog Eater, and the fashion blog Racked.

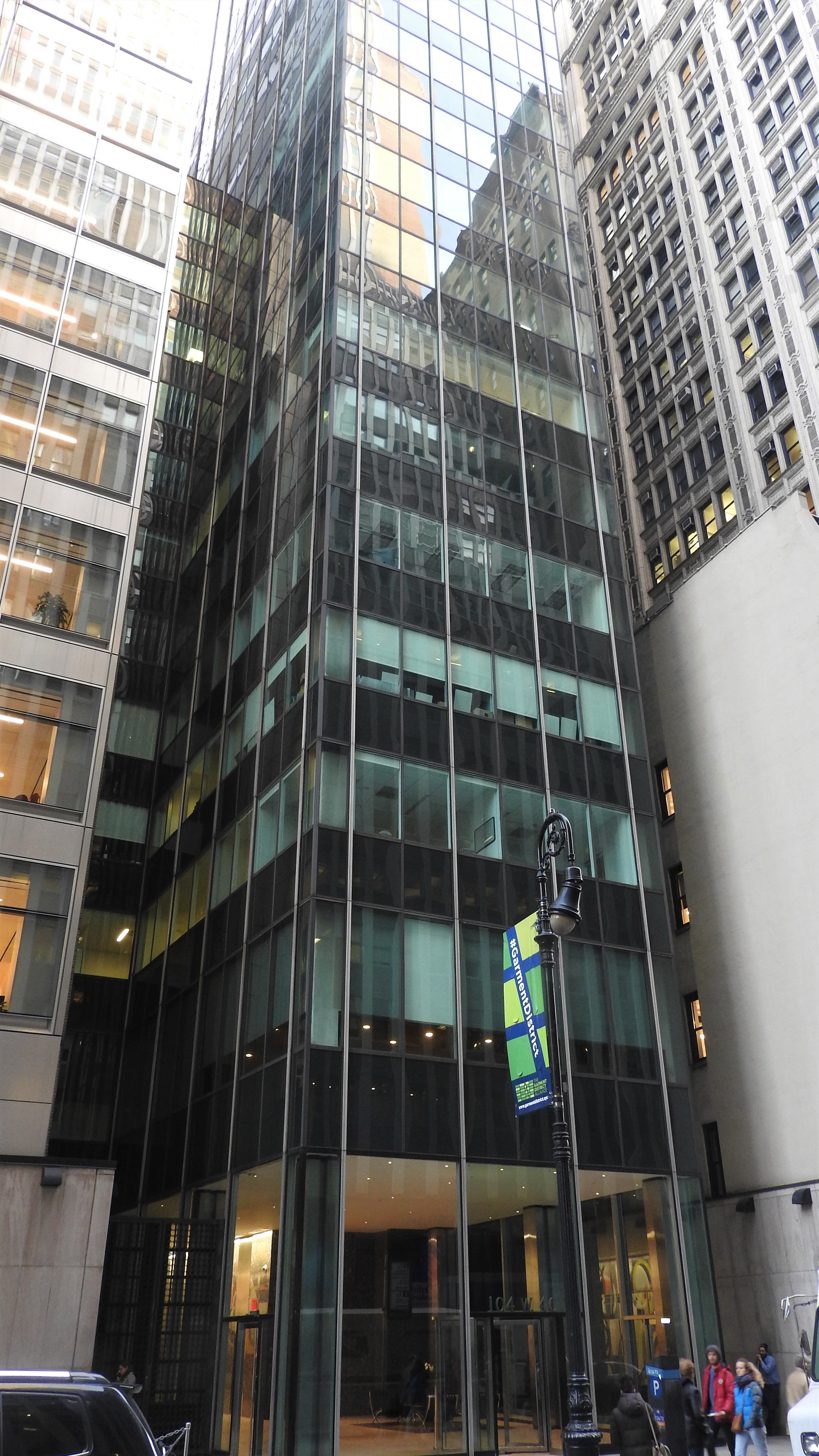
The company's former offices in New York were located at 104 West 40th Street

In April 2014, the company launched a news website, Vox. Led by former Washington Post columnist Ezra Klein, Melissa Bell and Matthew Yglesias, Vox was positioned as a general interest news service with a focus on providing additional context to recurring subjects within its articles.

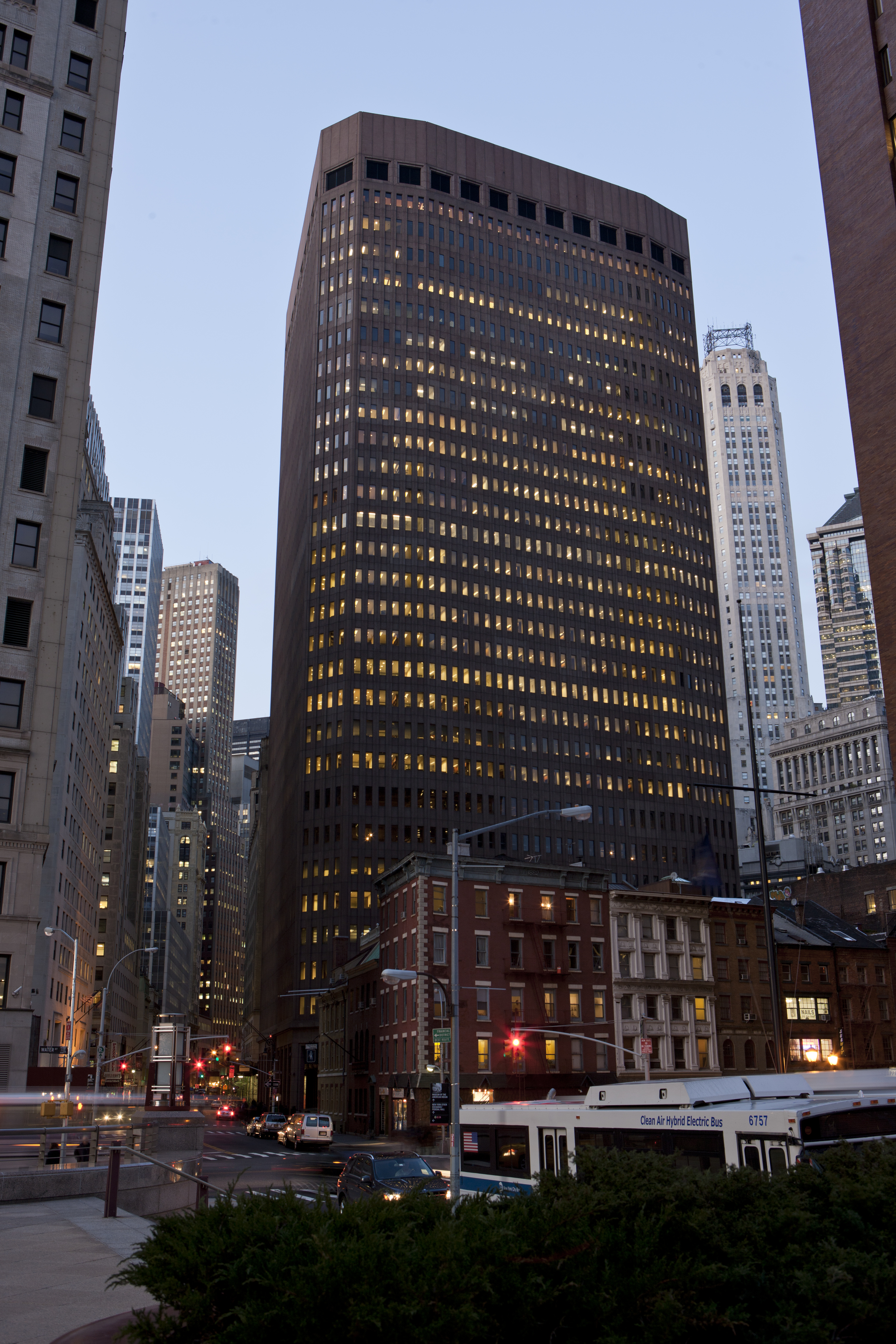
The company's headquarters are at 85 Broad Street in New York City since 2016

In May 2015, Vox Media acquired Recode, a technology industry news website that was founded by Walt Mossberg and Kara Swisher, the former editors of The Wall Street Journal's All Things Digital. In February 2017, Vox Media promoted Brundrett as its chief operating officer. In May 2017, Vox Media announced that it had entered into an agreement to provide technology and advertising sales for Bill Simmons' sports website The Ringer, as part of a revenue sharing agreement.

In February 2018, it was reported that Vox Media would be laying off around 50 employees, particularly surrounding video production. CEO Jim Bankoff stated previously that the company planned to exit native video for Facebook due to "unreliable monetization and promotion". The memo announcing the layoffs argued that despite its success, native video "won't be viable audience or revenue growth drivers for us relative to other investments we are making", and that the company wanted to focus more on podcasting and Vox Entertainment. The layoffs represented around 5% of Vox's workforce.

In April 2019, Vox Media acquired Epic magazine, which would become part of a new division called Vox Media Studios, which had also absorbed Vox Entertainment and the Vox Media Podcast Network. In September 2019, Vox Media agreed to acquire and merge with New York Media, the parent company of New York magazine.

The California Assembly Bill 5 was passed in September 2019, and the bill aimed at improving the working conditions for contract workers. In response to this bill, Vox Media announced in December 2019 that it would terminate more than 200 contracts of California-based freelance writers for SB Nation, and replace these writers with 20 full-time staff writers.

On April 17, 2020, Vox Media announced it would furlough 9% of its workforce from May 1 to July 31, 2020 due to the COVID-19 pandemic.

In January 2021, Lindsay Peoples Wagner was hired to be the new editor-in-chief of The Cut. At the same time, Vox Media also banned fossil fuel advertising to tackle climate change. In February 2021, Swati Sharma—former managing editor of The Atlantic—was hired to be the new editor-in-chief of Vox. Vox Media purchased Cafe Studios, the publisher of Preet Bharara's podcast Stay Tuned with Preet, in April 2021, making it part of the Vox Media Podcast Network.

In August 2021, Vox Media announced its purchase of Punch, a mixology website established by Bertelsmann-owned Random House, to undisclosed terms. Punch is to assist the expansion of Vox Media's Eater website.

On December 13, 2021, it was announced that Vox Media would acquire Group Nine Media. The acquisition was completed on February 22, 2022 for an undisclosed price. Investors in Group Nine, including Warner Bros. Discovery, now own 25 percent of Vox. In February 2023, Penske Media Corporation became the largest shareholder in Vox Media, acquiring a 20% stake in the company, and Jay Penske joined Vox's board.

In April 2023, it was announced that NowThis would be spun off as a separate company from Vox Media. The deal was backed by Accelerate Change.

In May 2025, Vox Media sold Polygon to Valnet, while also laying off most of their staff including Editor-in-Chief Christopher Plante. Aftermath reported they were informed by a "former employee" that "at least 25 people have been let go" and noted many of the laid off staff "were union members". The Vox Media Union was negotiating a new contract with Vox Media at the time, and the Writers Guild of America East (who represents the union) condemned the sale as union busting. Group Publisher for Polygon & The Verge Chris Grant shared his frustrations on Bluesky, stating that Valnet had refused to meet with him or answer questions during the process.

=== Split between Lupa Systems and Penske Media Corporation ===
In 2026, it was announced that James Murdoch's Lupa Systems would be acquiring roughly half Vox Media, including its podcast network, the New York magazine, and the Vox website. While the cost was undisclosed, people familiar with the deal said it cost more than $300 million, according to The New York Times. Websites which were not acquired were announced to begin operating under an unnamed, independent company, overseen by Ryan Pauley.

On June 18, 2026, the part of Vox Media not acquired by Lupa Systems was fully acquired by Penske Media Corporation. Before this, PMC was a shareholder of Vox, having 20% of shares. Pauley was announced as the president of a new subsidiary, PMX, which combines Vox Media and its publishing brands with "PMC's existing publishing portfolio". On July 8, 2026, the Lupa Systems acquisition of the Vox website, the Vox Media podcast network, and the New York magazine was completed. Vox Media announced that these divisions "will operate as a new subsidiary of Lupa Systems under the Vox Media name" with Jim Bankoff as the CEO.

== Corporate affairs ==
=== Funding ===
In December 2014, Vox Media raised a US$46.5 million round led by the growth equity firm General Atlantic, estimating the media company's value at around $380 million. Participants in Vox Media's previous rounds include Accel Partners, Comcast Ventures, and Khosla Ventures. Other funders are Allen & Company, Providence Equity Partners, and various angel investors, including Ted Leonsis, Dan Rosensweig, Jeff Weiner, and Brent Jones. According to sources, the Series C in May 2012, valued Vox Media at $140 million. A Series D valued the company north of $200 million, raising an additional $40 million.

In August 2015, NBCUniversal made a $200 million investment in Vox Media, valuing the company at more than $1 billion. Comcast, which owns NBCU, additionally already owned 14% of Vox through other subsidiaries.

=== Union ===
In January 2018, Vox Media agreed to recognize a labor union, the Vox Media Union, which had been formed by its editorial staff with help from the Writers Guild of America, East. On June 6, 2019, more than 300 employees under the Vox Media Union staged a walkout over failed labor agreements between the union and Vox Media, leading to most Vox Media websites temporarily ceasing operation.

The Vox Media Union negotiated with management during the widespread furloughs caused by the COVID-19 pandemic in the spring of 2020. The union "won a guarantee of no layoffs, no additional furloughs, and no additional pay cuts through July 31, along with enhanced severance for any layoffs that occur in August–December." Staffers at New York Magazine are represented by a separate union, under Newsguild.

=== Litigation ===
In September 2017, Vox Media was sued by Cheryl Bradley, a former manager of the "Mile High Hockey" site for SB Nation, which covered the Colorado Avalanche team. The suit alleged that Vox Media had only paid Bradley a $125 stipend per month, despite her being an employee of the company working 30–40 hours (and sometimes up to 50 hours) a week, and had therefore failed to reach obligatory wage and hour protections. Fellow former site managers John Wakefield and Maija Varda were later added to the suit as plaintiffs, and Vox Media unsuccessfully tried to have the case dismissed. The suit was granted class action status by the United States District Court for the District of Columbia in March 2019.

A second labor suit was filed as a class action lawsuit in California in September 2018, citing the Fair Labor Standards Act. Because this lawsuit could have covered 258 plaintiffs and damages of up to $6.3 million, Vox Media had the suit moved to the United States federal court under the Class Action Fairness Act.

In several cases, plaintiffs represented by the attorney Richard Liebowitz sued Vox Media over copyright infringement claims.

== Properties ==
Currently, Vox Media is made up of two media brands: Vox (general interest news), and New York Magazine, which includes the affiliated verticals Intelligencer (daily news), The Cut (women's issues), Vulture (pop culture), The Strategist (shopping), Curbed (real estate), and Grub Street (food and restaurants).

In 2026, the remaining Vox Media properties were split between two acquisitions: James Murdoch's Lupa Systems acquired the Vox Media podcast network, the New York magazine, and the Vox website; and Penske Media Corporation (PMC) acquired Vox Media itself and its remaining brands Eater (food and restaurants), The Verge (technology), SB Nation (sports), Popsugar (health and wellness), The Dodo (animals and pets), Punch (beverages and cocktails), and Thrillist (travel and experiences). As part of this acquisition, PMC created a new subsidiary PMX "which will combine PMC's existing publishing portfolio" with the Vox Media brands it purchased. Vox Media has previously owned or operated the online publications Racked (retail and shopping), Recode (technology news), NowThis (short-form content), and Polygon (gaming).

=== Current ===
==== Vox ====
Vox was launched in April 2014; it is a news website that employs explanatory journalism. The site's editor-in-chief is Swati Sharma.

Vox Media acquired technology industry news website Recode in May 2015. Recode also hosted the annual invite-only Code Conference, at which editors of the site interview prominent figures of the technology industry. Recode was integrated into Vox in May 2019 under the name Recode by Vox.

==== New York magazine ====
New York is an American biweekly magazine concerned with life, culture, politics, and style generally, and with a particular emphasis on New York City. On September 24, 2019, it was announced that the magazine's parent company, New York Media, was acquired by Vox Media.

The magazine's website, NYMag.com, was a companion to the print magazine until it was relaunched as a news site in 2006. It further includes several branded sites:

- Intelligencer: news and technology
- The Cut: women's issues
- Grub Street: food and restaurants
- The Strategist: internet shopping companion
- Vulture: pop culture
- Curbed: real-estate

Curbed originated as a standalone real-estate and home website that reached beyond New York City to publish in 32 markets across the U.S. It was founded in 2004 as a side project by Lockhart Steele, managing editor of Gawker Media. Vox Media would later acquire Curbed's parent company, Curbed Network, in November 2013 for $20–30 million in cash and stock, accumulating sister brands Eater and Racked as well. In May 2020, Vox Media announced it was merging Curbed into New York magazine's website, NYMag.com as a vertical.

=== Former ===
==== SB Nation ====
SB Nation (originally known as Sports Blog Nation) is a sports blogging network, founded by Tyler Bleszinski and Markos Moulitsas in 2005. The blog from which the network formed was started by Bleszinski as Athletics Nation in 2003, and focused solely on the Oakland Athletics. It has since expanded to cover sports franchises on a national scale, including all Major League Baseball, National Basketball Association, National Football League, and National Hockey League teams, as well as college and soccer teams, totaling over 300 community sites. In 2011, the network expanded into technology content with The Verge, leading to the parent company Sports Blogs Inc. being rebranded as Vox Media. Vox Media's chief executive, Jim Bankoff, has been SB Nation's CEO since 2009. The network expanded into radio programming in mid-2016 with SB Nation Radio, in partnership with Gow Media.

==== The Verge ====
The Verge is a technology news site, which launched on November 1, 2011; it was originally staffed by former employees of Engadget, including former editor Joshua Topolsky and the new site's editor-in-chief Nilay Patel. While Topolsky and his team were developing the new site, a "placeholder" site called This Is My Next was created to allow them to continue writing articles and producing podcasts. Topolsky described the site as being an "evolved version of what we [had] been doing [at AOL]."

In February 2014, The Verge had 7.9 million unique visitors according to ComScore.

==== Eater ====
Eater is a food and dining network of sites, offering reviews and news about the restaurant industry. The network was founded by Lockhart Steele and Ben Leventhal in 2005, and originally focused on dining and nightlife in New York City. Eater launched a national site in 2009, and covered nearly 20 cities by 2012. Vox Media acquired Eater, along with two others comprising the Curbed Network, in late 2013. In 2017, Eater had 25 local sites in the United States in Canada, and launched its first international site in London. The site has been recognized four times by the James Beard Foundation Awards. Eater is led by editor-in-chief Amanda Kludt.

==== Polygon ====
The video game website Polygon launched in 2012 as Vox Media's third property, and publishes news, culture, reviews, and videos. The site's founding staff included the editors-in-chief of the gaming sites Joystiq, Kotaku (Brian Crecente), and The Escapist. Staff published on The Verge as "Vox Games" beginning in February 2012, and launched as Polygon in October. The network features long-form journalism that focuses on the people making and playing the games rather than the games alone, and uses a "direct content sponsorship" model of online advertising. Chris Grant was the Editor-in-Chief (EIC) from 2012 to 2019; Grant was elevated to the position of Senior Vice President of Polygon and The Verge by Vox Media in July 2019. He was replaced by Christopher Plante who was the EIC from 2019 to 2025. Vox Media sold the website to Valnet in May 2025.

==== Racked ====
Racked was a retail and shopping website which covered style. It was acquired by Vox Media when the company acquired Curbed Network in November 2013. In December 2014, the site had 11.2 million page views and 8 million unique visitors. In addition to the national site, Racked had local sites for Los Angeles, New York City, Miami, and San Francisco. The editor-in-chief was Britt Aboutaleb. Racked was folded into Vox in September 2018.

==== NowThis ====
NowThis is a social media-focused media organization founded in 2012. The company specializes in creating short-form videos targeting Gen Z and Millennial audiences.

In 2016, NowThis joined with The Dodo, Thrillist, and Seeker to form Group Nine Media. Vox Media acquired Group Nine in February 2022. In April 2023, NowThis was spun off as a separate company from Vox Media in a deal backed by Accelerate Change, a nonprofit dedicated to increasing civic engagement among underrepresented groups. During its time as part of Vox Media, NowThis was ranked as the top news publisher in the United States in 2022 by the Reuters Institute, with more than 8.5 million followers for its news and politics accounts.

== Businesses ==
=== Vox Media Studios ===
In March 2015, Vox Media formed a new division known as Vox Entertainment. The division was created to expand the company's presence in developing unscripted online video programming. Vox Entertainment announced new shows in 2018, including American Style on CNN, Explained on Netflix, No Passport Required (hosted by chef Marcus Samuelsson) on PBS, and another named "Glad You Asked" series on YouTube. Vox Entertainment is helmed by Vox Media president Marty Moe. In 2016, vice president of Vox Entertainment, Chad Mumm, was named to the Forbes 30 Under 30 and Variety's "30 Execs to Watch" list.

In April 2019, Vox Media opened an expanded operation unit known as Vox Media Studios, run by company president Marty Moe. It serves as an umbrella for Vox Entertainment and the recently acquired Epic production and publishing unit. Vox Media Studios soon announced a new show, Retro Tech, hosted by Marques Brownlee on YouTube. In 2026, the company signed a first look deal with 20th Television to develop scripted programming.

=== Vox Media Podcast Network ===
The Vox Media Podcast Network is Vox Media's non-fiction audio programming business and has a broad portfolio of audio programming across business, technology, news and policy, sports, and dining. Shows include Stay Tuned with Preet by Preet Bharara, Recode Media with Peter Kafka, Lemonade Stand, and Recode Daily; The Verge's The Vergecast; and Vox's The Weeds, Vox Conversations, Today, Explained, Switched on Pop, Impeachment, Explained, Unexplainable, Pivot by Kara Swisher and Scott Galloway, Celebrity Memoir Book Club, and Vox Quick Hits. Vox Media acquired Criminal Productions in 2021, which includes the podcasts Criminal, This Is Love and Phoebe Reads a Mystery. The network won "Podcast Network of the Year" at the 2020 Adweek Podcast Awards. In 2026, the podcast network was acquired by Lupa Systems and became a division of its new subsidiary under the Vox Media name.

=== Former ===
==== Vox Creative ====
Vox Creative was Vox Media's branded entertainment business. In October 2017, Vox Creative expanded to launch The Explainer Studio to bring the explainer format to brand partners. In 2016, Vox Creative's ad for "Applebee's Taste Test" won the Digiday Video Award for Best Video Ad.

In August 2026, Penske Media Corporation announced the formation of DCP Studios under Dick Clark Productions, absorbing the former Vox Creative unit which was acquired in their purchase of the remaining Vox Media business.

==== Chorus ====
Conceived in 2008, Chorus was built to be a "next-generation" publishing platform. Developed specifically for SB Nation, it facilitates content creation, and implemented commenting and forums, which allowed for company growth, later evolving to analyze viewership and distribute content via various multimedia platforms. In 2014, Ezra Klein and Melissa Bell left The Washington Post to join Vox Media, in part because of the publishing platform. Additionally, the founders of Curbed, Eater, and The Verge said Chorus was a key reason for partnering with Vox Media. In 2018, Vox Media began to license Chorus as a software as a service (SaaS) business to other publishers, including Funny or Die and The Ringer. The Chicago Sun-Times signed on as the first traditional newspaper to launch on the platform in October 2018. Vox announced it would "wind down" Chorus in December 2022 amid a slump in advertising demand, stating that no new customers would be added and that existing customers had 18 months to depart the platform. Vox moved its own publications off Chorus onto WordPress VIP in 2023.

==== Concert ====
In April 2016, Vox Media and NBCUniversal launched Concert as a "premium, brand-friendly ad network" to reach more than 150 million people across their digital properties. New York Media, PopSugar, Quartz and Rolling Stone joined the marketplace in May 2018. In May 2018, Comscore estimated the network reaches almost 90 percent of all internet users. With the new partners, Concert launched C-Suite to reach executives among brands such as CNBC, Recode, The Verge, and Vox. In 2026, it was acquired by Penske Media Corporation.

==== Forte ====
In December 2019, Vox Media announced a first-party marketing platform named Forte, in order to offer marketers access to Vox Media's direct-to-consumer relationships. In 2026, it was acquired by Penske Media Corporation.

== Reception ==
In 2016, business magazine Inc. nominated Vox Media for "Company of the Year", citing that the company generated approximately $100 million in revenue in 2015, and was attracting 170 million unique users and 800 million content views monthly by 2016. Vox Media was named one of the world's "most innovative" media companies in 2017 by Fast Company for "doubling down on quality content while expanding". Vox Media was also named one of the "50 Great Places to Work" in Washington, D.C., by magazine Washingtonian. The company gained a rating of 95 out of 100 on the Human Rights Campaign's Corporate Equality Index, which rates businesses on their treatment of LGBT personnel.
