= Eater (website) =

Food website operated by Vox Media

- Website type: Food
- Available in: English
- Owners: Curbed.com LLC (2005–2013); Vox Media Inc. (2013–2026); PMX Global, LLC (since 2026)
- Website: eater.com
- Launched: July 2005; 21 years ago

Eater is a food website owned by PMX Global, LLC, unit of Penske Media Corporation. It was co-founded by Lockhart Steele and Ben Leventhal in 2005, and originally focused on dining and nightlife in New York City. Eater launched a national site in 2009, and covered nearly 20 cities by 2012. Vox Media acquired Eater, along with two others comprising the Curbed Network, in late 2013. In 2025, Eater operates sites in 23 American cities, as well as its national site. The site has been recognized twelve times by the James Beard Foundation Awards.

In 2026, PMC, the largest shareholder of Vox Media, agreed to acquire a number of the company's brands, consolidating its existing publishing portfolio into a new subsidiary, PMX, comprising over 25 titles, thereby strengthening its position as the largest digital media publisher.

== Description and history ==
The food and dining site Eater was founded as a brand of the digital media company Curbed.com LLC. It serves as a local restaurant guide, offering reviews as well as news about the restaurant industry. The property earns revenue via advertising, sometimes displaying content generated by Vox Creative.

Eater was co-founded by Lockhart Steele and Ben Leventhal in July 2005, and initially focused on New York City's dining and nightlife scenes. The blog was one of three comprising the Curbed Network, founded by Steele in 2004, along with the real estate and fashion networks called Curbed and Racked, respectively. By 2007, Eater was receiving tens of thousands of readers per day. After expanding into Los Angeles and San Francisco, the network went national in 2009, and covered approximately 20 cities and one U.S. state (Maine) by mid 2012.

Vox Media purchased the Curbed Network for approximately US$30 million in November 2013. Traffic to Eater increased by 250 percent following the acquisition. In early 2014, Business Insider reported that Eater was generating approximately 2 million of Vox Media's 45 million unique monthly visitors, according to the analytics company comScore. The site began using Vox Media's content management system, Chorus, and producing more video content. Steele said he sold Eater partly to observe Chorus' influence on the site. The platform allows Eater to enhance map, journalistic, and visual features, and improves user engagement via forums.

Eater Maine was shut down at the beginning of 2016. In mid 2017, Eater launched a London site, the network's first outside North America. Eater hosted 23 sites for cities in the United States and Canada at the time. It has since closed its London and Montreal sites.

In 2021, Vox Media acquired drinks website Punch as a brand within Eater.

In 2025, Eater laid off 15 employees.

== Programming ==
Eater may be best known for its maps, which serve as guides to readers on where to eat in specific cities. In 2022, Eater launched their Eater 38 maps, which share 38 essential restaurants in each Eater cities. Other Eater maps include Eater heatmaps which spotlight the newest restaurants in cities; as well as maps focused on certain cuisines or certain neighborhoods. The majority of Eater maps showcase restaurants across the 23 US cities for which it has dedicated sites, but there are also maps identifying the best restaurants in popular national and international destinations including St. Louis, Honolulu, Kansas City, Barcelona, Rome, Paris, Tokyo, and Florence.

In addition to written content, Eater has a team devoted to video. The site produced a web series called Savvy, which featured chefs, restaurateurs, and sommeliers discussing dishes and cooking techniques. The program's second season aired in 2015. In 2017, Vox Media greenlit the series Cult Following and You Can Do This for Eater.Eater’s video program is currently focused on mid-form docu-style video, with series such as Mise en Place, The Experts, Smoke Point, and Vendors. The program has earned five New York Emmy awards, including two for Vendors (one in 2022, another in 2021), and four Daytime Emmy nominations.

Eater and PBS collaborated on a six-episode documentary television show about the cuisine of immigrant neighborhoods throughout the U.S., hosted by chef and restaurateur Marcus Samuelsson. The show, No Passport Required, marked Eater's first television production project. Vox Entertainment produced the show, which premiered in July 2018. Vox Media executives Jim Bankoff and Marty Moe serve as two of several executive producers.

In January 2018, Eater and SB Nation aired an online three-episode celebrity cooking competition series sponsored by PepsiCo. The show featured National Football League players Greg Jennings, Rashad Jennings, and Nick Mangold as competitors, as well as chefs Anne Burrell and Josh Capon.

In 2020, Eater debuted its first TV series in partnership with Hulu, Eater’s Guide to the World. The seven-episode show was hosted by Maya Rudolph and explored unique dining experiences across the world, with episodes spotlighting Los Angeles, Costa Rica, Casablanca, and more.

In 2022, Eater announced its first book deal in partnership with Abrams publishing. In 2023, Eater released its first cookbook featuring restaurant recipes, edited by former Eater restaurant editor Hillary Dixler Canavan. In 2024, travel guides to New York City and Los Angeles.

In 2024, Eater launched the Eater app for iOS, featuring all of the maps from all 23 of the website's cities and Eater.com—in total 10,000 maps from over 100 cities worldwide.

== Leadership ==
Eater was initially led by co-founders Leventhal and Steele, who also served as president of the Curbed Network, ranked number 34 in The Daily Meal's 2011 list of "America's 50 Most Powerful People in Food", for his role as a founder of Eater.

In 2014, Amanda Kludt was named Eater's first editor-in-chief, and Robert Sietsema was hired to be a New York-based food writer.

In March 2022, Stephanie Wu became Eater’s second-ever editor-in-chief, succeeding Amanda Kludt. In 2024, Jill Dehnert, Eater's former GM, was named the group publisher of the lifestyle publications at Vox Media, comprising Eater, PS, Punch, and Thrillist.

== Reception ==
Food & Wine has called Eater "required reading". In 2006, the magazine included Steele and Leventhal in their "Tastemaker Awards" list, recognizing fifteen people who had significant impact on the food and wine industries by age 35, for their "ingenious" posts.

The network's content has been recognized twelve times by the James Beard Foundation Awards, established to honor excellence in cuisine, food writing, and culinary education in the United States. Eater has also won six awards from American Society of Magazine Editors (ASME) and five Emmys. On the local level, various Eater cities have been recognized by local chapters of the Society of Professional Journalists including the SPJ Northwest, SPJ Chicago, and SPJ DC as well as the New York Press Club and Los Angeles Press Club.

== See also ==
- List of websites about food and drink
