= Marty Moe =

American business executive

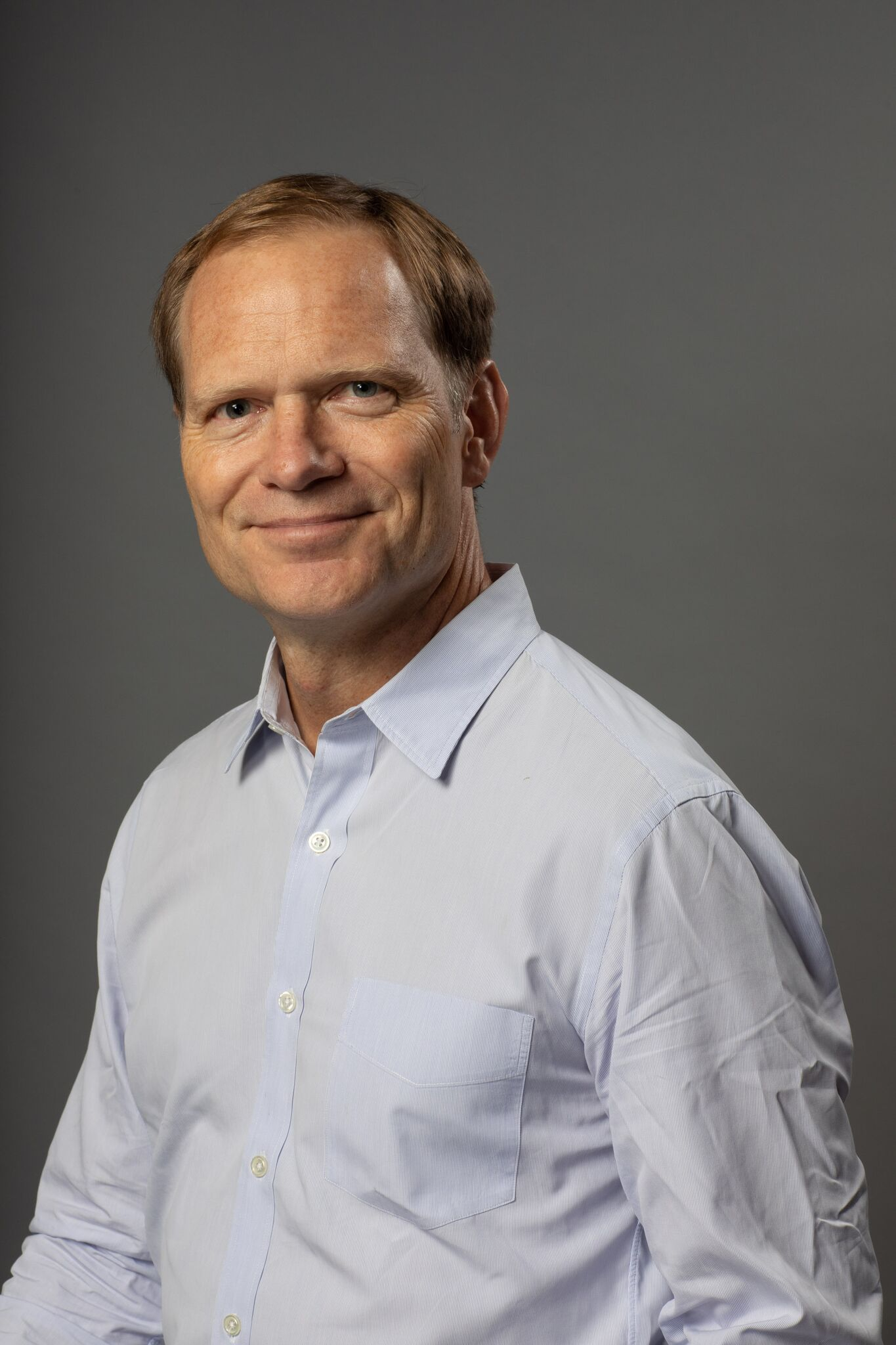
- Moe in September 2018
- Born: Martin Troen Moe; 1964 or 1965 (age 61–62)
- Citizenship: American
- Education: Oberlin College; New York University School of Law
- Occupation: President of Vox Media
- Employer: Vox Media
- Parents: Daniel Moe (father); Doris M. Tanner (mother)

Martin Troen Moe (born 1965 or 1966) is an American business executive, and the president of Vox Media. Early in his career, he was an associate at Skadden, Arps, Slate, Meagher & Flom and an adviser to Lawrence Summers, United States Secretary of the Treasury. He later worked for AOL before joining SportsBlogs Inc, which rebranded as Vox Media in 2011. He is credited as a co-founder of the technology news website The Verge. He was the site's publisher, then Vox Media's chief content officer, before being promoted to the role of president.

== Early life and education ==
Martin Troen Moe is the son of Daniel Moe, a former choral music professor at the Oberlin Conservatory of Music, and Doris M. Tanner, a psychotherapist. He attended Oberlin College and the New York University School of Law.

== Career ==
In the late 1990s, Moe was an associate at the Washington, D.C. office of Skadden, Arps, Slate, Meagher & Flom, a law firm based in New York City. He was appointed to serve as an adviser to Lawrence Summers, United States Secretary of the Treasury, during the presidency of Bill Clinton.

Moe joined AOL in November 2001, and served as senior vice-president of the money and finance group, and news and information group, in the company's content division. Media coverage has credited him with developing the company's content brands, including DailyFinance, Engadget, and WalletPop. He resigned in 2010, effective that October.

Moe joined former AOL executive Jim Bankoff at SB Nation in April 2011, initially serving as chief content officer. In November 2011, SB Nation rebranded as Vox Media and launched the technology news website The Verge. Business Insider ranked Moe and Joshua Topolsky number 73 on its 2011 list of "The 100 Coolest People in New York Tech", recognizing their work in launching The Verge. Moe co-founded and served as publisher of the site, along with the video game news website Polygon, which launched as another Vox Media brand in October 2012. Business Insider ranked Moe and Topolsky number 14 on their 2012 "Silicon Alley" list of "The Coolest People in New York Tech This Year", again recognizing their work on The Verge.

Moe was named chief operating officer of Vox Media in January 2013, and became the company's president by 2015. He also oversees Vox Entertainment in this role. Moe served as executive producer for Foul Play, a documentary series developed by the business in conjunction with SB Nation and Verizon Communications' go90 platform, premiering in 2018. He is also executive producer for No Passport Required, a PBS cuisine and travel television series that premiered in 2018, as well as the American Style series, which was slated to air on CNN in 2019.

== Personal life ==
In June 1998, Moe married Lisel Loy, who served as a special counsel in the Secretary of the Interior's office at the United States Department of the Interior, and later as Staff Secretary in the White House under President Bill Clinton. They have two children together.
