= Lora Kolodny =

American journalist

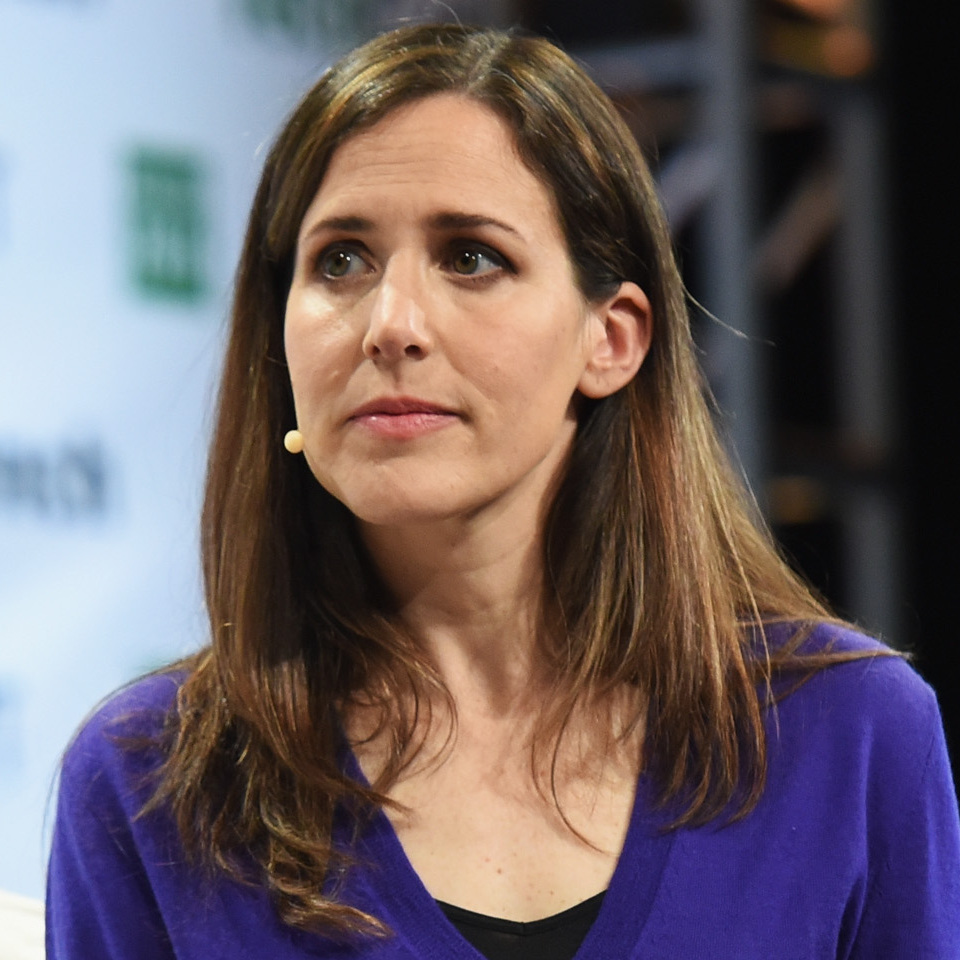
- Kolodny in 2016
- Education: Williams College (BA)
- Occupation: Journalist
- Employer: CNBC.com

Lora Kolodny is an American technology journalist who has written over 2000 articles for CNBC.com, TechCrunch, and other publications. Kolodny is best known for her work on electric vehicle companies and climate technology, specifically for her coverage of Tesla. She is one of the journalists Elon Musk intentionally blocked on Twitter.

== Career ==
Kolodny's early journalism career involved writing for Inc. magazine, The Hollywood Reporter, and FastCompany. During this period, Kolodny also wrote for TechCrunch in New York as a cleantech writer and trends editor. She then handled the venture capital beat for the Dow Jones VentureWire and The Wall Street Journal for four years, starting in 2012. While at The Wall Street Journal, Kolodny broke stories about the Thiel Fellowship and celebrities investing in startups.

In 2016, Lora Kolodny rejoined TechCrunch as the publication's emerging technologies editor and video host, and served as a moderator during TechCrunch Disrupt SF 2016. She joined CNBC.com in 2017 and continues to operate from San Francisco.
