= Tomi Jazz =

Jazz club in Manhattan, New York

- Interactive map of the Tomi Jazz area

General information
- Location: 239 East 53rd Street, Manhattan, New York, United States
- Coordinates: 40.75731°N 73.96779°W

Tomi Jazz is a jazz club, bar, and izakaya in Manhattan, New York City.

== History ==
The first Tomi Jazz location was in the Little Tokyo area near East 9th Street. In 2000, it relocated to Midtown Manhattan, where many Japanese people lived and worked at the time "following a surge in Japan's economy" starting in the 1980s.

Originally, Tomi Jazz was a "membership club that only served Japanese patrons." However, it was eventually bought in 2010 by Ken Mukohata, who opened it to the public and "established a nightly jazz calendar."

== Critical reception ==
The Infatuation gave Tomi Jazz an eight out of ten and called it one of the sixteen best jazz clubs in New York City.

Time Out also called it one of the best jazz clubs in the city.

Tammie Teclemariam, writing for Grub Street, called it "one of the coolest places I've been to this year" in 2022.
