= The Real Deal (magazine) =

Magazine

- Editor: Stuart Elliott
- Categories: News
- Frequency: Daily
- Publisher: Amir Korangy
- Founder: Amir Korangy
- First issue: July 2003
- Company: Korangy Publishing
- Country: United States
- Based in: New York City
- Language: English
- Website: therealdeal.com
- OCLC: 53151043

The Real Deal is a media company with a focus on New York City, South Florida and Los Angeles. The news outlet was started in 2003 by Amir Korangy, and focuses on both commercial and residential real estate. The online and print publication, which serves as a source for other periodicals, was self-proclaimed "the must-read news source for real estate news," in a profile in the Los Angeles Times in 2009, and "the hot sheet for NYC real estate professionals," by the New York Post.

== History ==
Korangy's Korangy Publishing founded The Real Deal in April 2003. It was Korangy's third venture into publishing, the first being the Gringo Gazette, a weekly newspaper in Baja, Mexico targeted at expatriates, and the second being the Washington Free Press, a weekly tabloid in Washington, D.C. Korangy was named one of the 100 most powerful figures in New York City real estate by the New York Observer in 2009. The magazine's editor-in-chief since its first year is Stuart W. Elliott, who previously worked for The New York Times.

The Real Deal launched a South Florida website in February 2008, and a Los Angeles website in 2016.

In 2012, The Real Deal made its first foray into filmmaking, with the documentary "Building Stories", as part of the PBS series "Treasures of New York." The film focuses on the prolific architect Costas Kondylis, who has helped shape the New York skyline with 86 towers, but is relatively unknown to the general public. Examining Kondylis' work, which has received mixed reviews, the film looks at the balance between art and commerce in getting a building built in the city, and how the city gets shaped. In 2015, The Real Deal published its first book, "The Closing: Interviews with New York City's Titans of Real Estate."

== Events, publications and awards ==
The Real Deal has hosted annual real estate forums in New York for more than a decade, with some events drawing more than 4,000 people. For several years, the event was held at Lincoln Center. The events typically feature panels of industry experts and leaders who explore current trends and critical issues facing the real estate industry; in 2011, the event was instead structured as a series of debates featuring an array of real estate professionals from around New York City including Stewart Saft, Harry B. Macklowe, Adam Leitman Bailey, John Catsimatidis, Frederick Peters, Lockhart Steele, Nancy Ruddy, John Centra, Andrew Barrocas, and Faith Hope Consolo. As of 2017, The Real Deal holds regular events in New York, Miami, Los Angeles and Shanghai in China. The publication held its first ever comedy roast in February 2018.

In addition to the monthly New York magazine, The Real Deal now publishes quarterly publications in Los Angeles and Miami. It also publishes special issues once a year for the Hamptons, Long Island, New Jersey, Westchester and Fairfield counties, as well as an annual retail issue distributed each May at ICSC's Recon, the largest global event for retail real estate.

The company also publishes an annual Data Book reference guide for real estate professionals, which includes current and historical looks at the city's real estate market, divided into coverage of residential and commercial real estate, plus a section on development projects.

In early 2017, the company launched TRData, a research section that offers comprehensive biographical information on real estate professionals and companies in New York City, as well as information on properties, including new developments. The site also includes a database of completed real estate deals in the city, market reports and industry rankings. TRData also sells custom research reports.

In mid-2017, TheRealDeal.com was named the website with the wealthiest audience by Quantcast, beating out sites including CNBC, Crunchbase, Nasdaq, MarketWatch, and hundreds of others. Quantcast looked at the top 500 websites in the U.S. that use Quantcast Measure, based on monthly pageviews. TRD also made the top 25 on Quantcast's list of websites with the most educated audience. Just under 80 percent of TheRealDeal.com's readers have at least an undergraduate degree.

Since 2011, The Real Deal has won dozens of awards from the National Association of Real Estate Editors, the Society of Professional Journalists, the Newswomen's Club of New York and other journalism organizations. These awards range from everything to best residential/commercial magazine to best investigative work to best breaking news stories.

The Real Deal was recognized with 2 NAREE awards in 2011 and 5 NAREE awards in 2012; in 2013, it was recognized with SABEW's General Excellence award, as well as four NAREE awards in the same year; in 2014, it was awarded three NAREE awards. Throughout 2015, The Real Deal received a Newswomen's Club Front Page Award, a gold-prize NAREE award and a SABEW runner-up prize. In 2016, The Real Deal nabbed 12 NAREE awards, a Deadline Club award and a financial journalism award from the NY State Society of CPAs. Most recently, in 2017, TRD was awarded a combined 14 awards from NAREE and SABEW, including one for an investigative collaboration with ProPublica.
