= The Verge =

American technology news and media website

- Screenshot of the website in December 2024
- Website type: Technology News Science, Entertainment
- Headquarters: 85 Broad Street; New York City, NY 10004; U.S.
- Owners: Vox Media Inc. (2011–2026); PMX Global, LLC (since 2026)
- Creators: Joshua Topolsky; Jim Bankoff; Marty Moe
- Editor: Nilay Patel
- Website: theverge.com
- Commercial: Yes
- Registration: Required to subscribe for access
- Launched: November 1, 2011; 15 years ago
- Current status: Online
- OCLC number: 867048487

The Verge is an online American technology news publication headquartered in Lower Manhattan, New York City, and operated by PMX Global, LLC, unit of Penske Media Corporation. The website publishes news, feature stories, guidebooks, product reviews, consumer electronics news, and podcasts.

The website was launched on November 1, 2011, and used Vox Media's proprietary multimedia publishing platform Chorus until January 28, 2025, when it switched to WordPress. In 2014, Nilay Patel was named editor-in-chief and Dieter Bohn executive editor; Helen Havlak was named editorial director in 2017. The Verge won five Webby Awards for the year 2012 including awards for Best Writing (Editorial), Best Podcast for The Vergecast, Best Visual Design, Best Consumer Electronics Site, and Best Mobile News App.

== History ==
Original wordmark (2011–2016)

Second wordmark (2016–2022)

=== Origins ===
Between March and April 2011, up to nine of Engadget's writers, editors, and product developers, including editor-in-chief Joshua Topolsky, left AOL, the company behind that website, to start a new gadget site. The other departing editors included managing editor Nilay Patel and staffers Paul Miller, Ross Miller, Joanna Stern, Chris Ziegler, as well as product developers Justin Glow and Dan Chilton. In early April 2011, Topolsky announced that their unnamed new site would be produced in partnership with sports news website SB Nation, debuting some time in the fall. Topolsky lauded SB Nation's similar interest in the future of publishing, including what he described as their beliefs in independent journalism and in-house development of their own content delivery tools. SB Nation's Jim Bankoff saw an overlap in the demographics of the two sites and an opportunity to expand SB Nation's model. Bankoff previously worked at AOL in 2005, where he led their Engadget acquisition. Other news outlets viewed the partnership as positive for both SB Nation and Topolsky's staff, and negative for AOL's outlook.

Bankoff, chairman and CEO of Vox Media (owner of SB Nation), said in a 2011 interview that though the company had started out with a focus on sports, other categories including consumer technology had growth potential for the company. Development of Vox Media's content management system (CMS), Chorus, was led by Trei Brundrett, who later became the chief operating officer for the company.

=== This Is My Next ===
Following news of his untitled partnership with SB Nation in April 2011, Topolsky announced that the Engadget podcast hosted by Patel, Paul Miller, and himself would continue at an interim site called This Is My Next. By August 2011, the site had reached 1 million unique visitors and 3.4 million page views. By October 2011, the site had 3 million unique views per month and 10 million total page views. Time listed the site in its Best Blogs of 2011. The site closed upon The Verge's launch on November 1, 2011.

On June 11, 2014, The Verge launched a new section called "This Is My Next", edited by former editor David Pierce, as a buyer's guide for consumer electronics. By 2022, this section had been retitled simply "Buying Guide".

=== Launch ===
The Verge launched November 1, 2011, along with an announcement of a new parent company: Vox Media. According to the company, the site launched with 4 million unique visitors and 20 million pageviews. At the time of Topolsky's departure, Engadget had 14 million unique visitors. Vox Media overall doubled its unique visitors to about 15 million during the last half of 2012. The Verge had 12 former Engadget staffers working with Topolsky at the time of launch. It hired Tom Warren, former Neowin editor-in-chief and WinRumors blogger, as their new United Kingdom based senior editor. In 2013, The Verge launched a new science section, Verge Science, with former Wired editor Katie Drummond leading the effort. Patel replaced Topolsky as editor-in-chief in mid-2014. Journalist Walt Mossberg joined The Verge's editing team after Vox Media acquired Recode in 2015. By 2016, the website's advertising had shifted from display advertisements, matched with articles' contents, to partnerships and advertisements adjusted to the user.

=== 2016–present ===
2016–2022 logo

Vox Media revamped The Verge's visual design for its fifth anniversary in November 2016. Its logo featured a modified Penrose triangle, an impossible object. On November 1, The Verge launched version 3.0 of its news platform, offering a redesigned website along with the new logo.

In September 2016, The Verge fired deputy editor Chris Ziegler after it learned that he had been working for Apple since July. Helen Havlak was promoted to editorial director in mid-2017. In 2017, The Verge launched "Guidebook" to host technology product reviews. In May 2018, Verge Science launched a YouTube channel, which had more than 638,000 subscribers and 30 million views by January 2019. The channel received more than 5.3 million views in November 2018 alone. As of August 2023, the channel has over 100 million views and 1.15 million subscribers.

In March 2022, Dieter Bohn announced his resignation from The Verge in his position of Executive Editor, and that he would be moving to a new position at Google.

The Verge rebranded and redesigned its website in September 2022 with a sharper, more simplistic logo, more colorful visual design, and new typefaces. Its new home page format resembled a news feed, incorporating external conversations from social media and reporting from other publications. The new format will, in part, reduce aggregation reporting.

In December 2024, The Verge began to paywall some content behind a subscription service; this offering covers "premium" reports, newsletters, and reviews, as well as fewer advertisements and other features. In a blog post, Patel announced the initial subscription rate as $7 per month or $50 per year. Patel also writes in the post that the reason for moving to a subscription model was for the site to survive an increasingly difficult market for "the kind of rigorous, independent journalism we want to do."

In June 2026, Penske Media Corporation, the largest shareholder of Vox Media, agreed to acquire a number of the company's brands, including The Verge, consolidating its existing publishing portfolio into a new subsidiary, PMX, which encompasses over 25 publications.

== Content ==
=== Podcasts ===
Podcasts associated with The Verge	Host(s)	Released from	To	Awards / Notes
The Vergecast	David Pierce	4 November 2011	Present day	2013 Webby People's Voice, 2026 Webby Nominee
The Verge Mobile Show	The Verge Editors	8 November 2011	25 March 2014	
Verge Extras	Various	February 2015	Present day	One-off special events
The Verge What's Tech	Chris Plante	12 February 2015	6 December 2016	Among iTunes's best of 2015
Decoder with Nilay Patel	Nilay Patel	8 July 2015	Present day	2024 Signal Gold
Ctrl-Walt-Delete	Walt Mossberg	24 September 2015	11 May 2018	
Why'd You Push That Button?	Ashley Carman & Kaitlyn Tiffany	17 October 2017	15 July 2020	2018 Podcast Award
Version History	David Pierce	5 October 2025	Present day	

The Verge broadcasts a daily podcast, The Vergecast, which serves as the publication's primary anchor for technology criticism and news analysis. The inaugural episode was November 4, 2011, and included a video stream of the hosts. While originally weekly, the show expanded to a bi-weekly release schedule in early 2024 to cover both macro tech news and consumer electronics, with The Verge increasing frequency a second time in 2026, now publishing every weekday. The show has maintained long-standing industry recognition, winning a Webby People's Voice award in 2013 and securing a Webby nomination in 2026. In October 2025, The Vergecast launched a dedicated ad-free feed for The Verge subscribers. On June 1, 2026, The Verge released the first episode of its new daily schedule on The Vergecast.

A second weekly podcast was introduced on November 8, 2011. Unlike The Vergecast, The Verge Mobile Show was primarily focused on mobile phones, with its last episode airing on March 25, 2014. The Verge also launched the weekly podcast Ctrl-Walt-Delete, hosted by Walt Mossberg, in September 2015. Mossberg concluded his standard podcast in June 2017 but released a special edition episode for the 20-year anniversary of the iMac on May 11, 2018.

The Verge's What's Tech podcast, hosted by Chris Plante, was aimed at making technology more accessible and was named among iTunes's best of 2015. The podcast Why'd You Push That Button?, launched in 2017 and co-hosted by Ashley Carman and Kaitlyn Tiffany, investigated the social impact of technological decisions and received a Podcast Award in the "This Week in Tech Technology Category" in 2018.

Editor-in-chief Nilay Patel hosts an executive interview podcast called Decoder, structured around big questions concerning corporate power and decision-making. The show won a Signal Award Gold for Technology in 2024. On February 8, 2024, Patel announced Decoder would start to release two episodes per week, with the Thursday episode "explain[ing] big topics in the news with Verge reporters, experts, and other friends of the show."

On September 22, 2025, David Pierce announced a new documentary-style show named Version History, with its goal being to "tell the stories behind the most interesting tech products ever." The premiere date was set for October 5, 2025, and was to gain a new episode every Sunday. Focusing heavily on product archeology, the show aired the finale of its third season on April 12, 2026, examining the AT&T Western Electric 500 telephone. Without an official trailer, The Verge released the first episode of the fourth season on June 14, 2026.

=== Video content ===
==== On The Verge ====
On August 6, 2011, in an interview with the firm Edelman, The Verge co-founder Marty Moe announced it was launching The Verge Show, a web television series. After its launch, the show was named On The Verge. The first episode was recorded on Monday, November 14, 2011, with guest Matias Duarte. The show is a technology news entertainment show, and its format is similar to that of a late-night talk show, but it is broadcast over the Internet, not on television. The show's first episode was released on November 15, 2011.

Ten episodes of On The Verge were broadcast, with the most recent episode going out on November 10, 2012. On May 24, 2013, it was announced that the show would return under a new weekly format, alongside a new logo and theme tune.

==== Other video content ====
On May 8, 2013, editor-in-chief Topolsky announced Verge Video, a website that contains the video backlog from The Verge.

Circuit Breaker, a gadget blog, launched in 2016, has amassed nearly one million Facebook followers and debuted a live show on Twitter in October 2017. The blog's videos average more than 465,000 views, and Jake Kastrenakes serves as editor-in-chief, as of 2017. Also in 2016, USA Network and The Verge partnered on Mr. Robot Digital After Show, a digital aftershow for the television series Mr. Robot. In December, Twitter and Vox Media announced a live streaming partnership for The Verge's programs covering the Consumer Electronics Show.

The series Next Level, hosted and produced by Lauren Goode, debuted in 2017 and was recognized in the "Technology" category at the 47th annual San Francisco / Northern California Emmy Awards (2018). In August 2017, The Verge launched the web series Space Craft, hosted by science reporter Loren Grush.

In 2022, The Verge produced the show The Future Of for Netflix.

== PC build guide controversy ==
In September 2018, The Verge published the article "How to Build a Custom PC for Editing, Gaming or Coding" with a companion YouTube video entitled "How we Built a $2000 Custom Gaming PC". The video was criticized for containing errors on almost every step presented by its host, Stefan Etienne, such as applying an unnecessary amount of thermal paste onto the processor as opposed to a small amount. An online harassment campaign against Etienne ensued.

In February 2019, lawyers from The Verge's parent company Vox Media filed a DMCA takedown notice, requesting that YouTube remove videos critical of The Verge's video, alleging copyright infringement. YouTube took down two of the videos, uploaded by YouTube channels BitWit and ReviewTechUSA, while applying a copyright "strike" to these two channels. YouTube later reinstated the two videos and retracted the copyright "strikes" after a request from Verge editor Nilay Patel, although Patel acknowledged that he agreed with the legal argument that led to their removal. Timothy B. Lee of Ars Technica described this controversy as an example of the Streisand effect, saying that while law regarding fair use is unclear regarding this type of situation, "the one legal precedent ... suggests ... that this kind of video is solidly within the bounds of copyright's fair use doctrine."

Nearly three years after the erroneous build, PC builder and YouTuber Linus Sebastian collaborated with Etienne in a video entitled "Fixing the Verge PC build". In the video, Etienne admits not being an experienced builder when he assembled the PC, having built only four computers at that point, with The Verge build being his first on camera. Etienne said before the video went live, The Verge was unwilling to hear from him to address what he saw were editing issues, insisting that the video be uploaded regardless.
