= Ben Uri Gallery & Museum =

Art museum in London

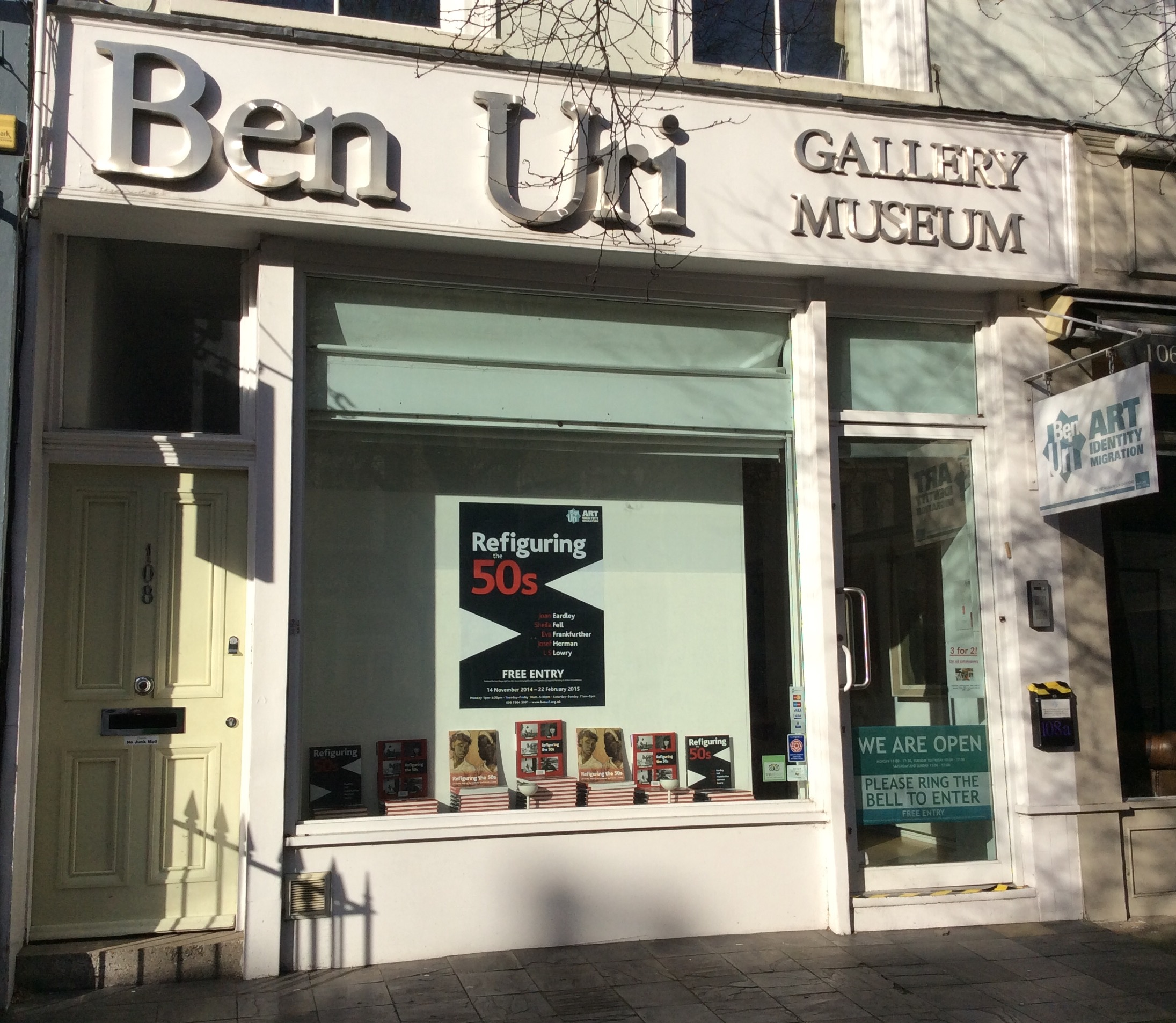

- Location within London
- Established: 1915
- Location: Boundary Road; London, NW8
- Coordinates: 51.5375°N 0.1854°W
- Public transit access: Kilburn High Road
- Website: www.benuri.org.uk

The Ben Uri Gallery & Museum is a registered museum and charity based at 108a Boundary Road, off Abbey Road in St John's Wood, London, England. It features the work and lives of émigré artists in London, and describes itself as "The Art Museum for Everyone".

Its website includes the museum's collection, reflecting the Jewish and immigrant contribution to British art since 1900, including an itemised exhibition list from 1925 onwards, a digitised archive and catalogue of its art reference library. It also includes online exhibitions, podcasts and audio material.

== History ==
The Ben Uri Art Society was founded in the East End of London in 1915 by the Russian emigre artist Lazar Berson to provide an art venue for Jewish immigrant craftsmen and artists then unable to gain access to mainstream artistic societies, due to traditional obstacles faced by all migrant minorities. Ben Uri was founded along the lines of the Bezalel School, created nine years earlier in 1906 in Jerusalem. It was named after Bezalel Ben Uri, the craftsman who designed and built the Ark of the Covenant. From 1926 to 1933, the president of the Ben Uri Art Society was the Polish painter Leopold Pilichowski (1869–1934).

After electing a new board of trustees in October 2000, led by David Glasser, the charity was relaunched in 2001 with a new name, Ben Uri Gallery and Museum. For many years based in Soho, since June 2002 the charity has moved to the St. John's Wood gallery in north London.

== Permanent collection ==
Its permanent collection has about 1,300 artworks, and is seeking a site in central London to display them, as its present location is only large enough for temporary exhibitions including the series on the Whitechapel Boys; Cross Purposes, tracing the use of the Crucifixion motif during the 20th century and recent contemporary art; in June 2012 Dodo, re-discovering an artist from Berlin in the Weimar 1920s and 30s; followed in October by a survey of 40 years work by the American artist Judy Chicago.

== Recent exhibitions ==
In June 2017, Art Out of the Bloodlands: A Century of Polish Artists in Britain opened.
