= Jojol =

French YouTuber

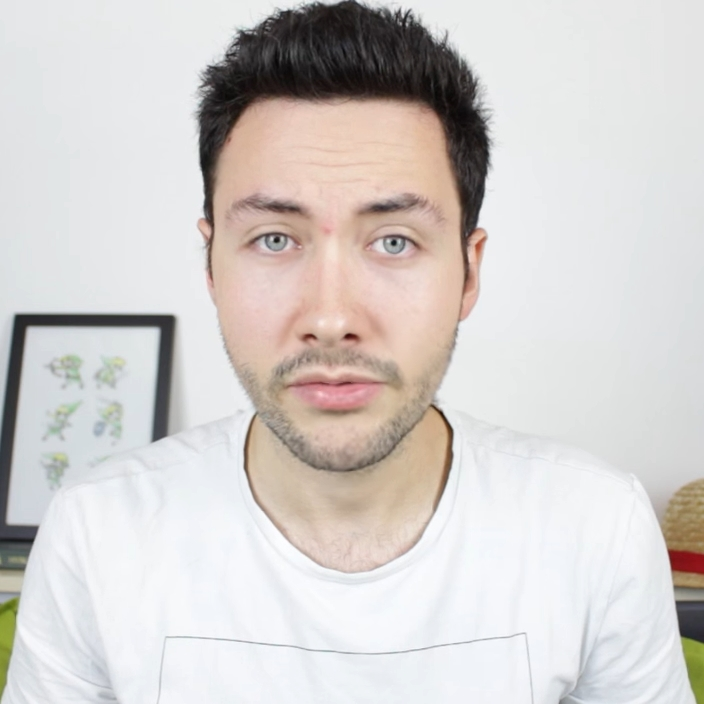
- Born: November 21, 1992 (age 33); Strasbourg
- Occupations: YouTuber; Tech blogger

YouTube information
- Channel: Jojol
- Years active: 2009–present
- Subscribers: 2.65 million
- Views: 589 million
- Last updated: July 10, 2025

Johan Lelièvre, known by his pseudonym Jojol, is a French YouTuber specializing in high-tech.

As of July 2025, he owns the most followed French YouTube channel in the high-tech field.

== Education ==
Johan Lelièvre graduated from France's Baccalauréat S with honors. He completed a diploma in technological studies in marketing techniques.

== Career ==
He launched his YouTube channel in 2009, "out of passion and a desire to share ".

In 2019, he launches Appy, an app offering one contest a day.

In 2023, his YouTube channel ranks 46th most followed in France.

== Controversy ==
In October 2018, he published a video in which he presented an iPhone XS bought new for €429 (sold from €859 by Apple) on the site named Jupry. After the video was published, he received a lot of criticism on Twitter accusing him of promoting a site based on Ponzi pyramid schemes. Following the controversy, he quickly put the video in private.
