= Curbed =

News website covering housing and urban design

- Website type: Online newspaper
- Available in: English
- Owner: Vox Media
- Website: curbed.com
- Commercial: Yes
- Registration: Optional
- Launched: 2006; 20 years ago
- Current status: Active

Curbed is an American real estate and urban design website published by New York magazine. Founded as a blog by Lockhart Steele in 2006 to cover New York City real estate, it grew by 2010 to feature sub-pages dedicated to specific real estate markets and metropolitan areas across the United States. Steele once described Curbed.com as an "Architectural Digest after a three-martini lunch". The site hosted an annual contest, the Curbed Cup, to pick the best neighborhood in each city.

In November 2013, Vox Media purchased the Curbed Network, which, apart from Curbed, also included dining website Eater and fashion website Racked. The New York Times reported that the cash-and-stock deal was worth between $20 million and $30 million. In 2018, the Curbed critic Alexandra Lange won a New York Press Club award for her story "No Loitering, No Skateboarding, No Baggy Pants."

Curbed had expanded to include area-specific editions for Atlanta, Austin, Boston, Chicago, Detroit, Los Angeles, New Orleans, New York City, Philadelphia, San Francisco, Seattle, and Washington, D.C. In 2020, however, as a part of a downward trend of layoffs and restructuring of many venture capital-funded sites, and the effects of the COVID-19 pandemic, many of Curbed's area-specific sites closed, leaving New York City as the site's sole remaining metropolitan focus.

In October 2020, Curbed was integrated into New York magazine's suite of digital publications, where it was redesigned and focused more tightly on New York City's built environment, design, architecture, real estate, and urbanism. Its prominent contributors include New York's Pulitzer Prize–winning architecture and music critic Justin Davidson and the magazine's acclaimed design writer Wendy Goodman.

In 2026, The Architect's Newspaper reported that "since December 2025, a significant portion of the [Curbed's] national coverage and vast network of city-specific beats has been taken offline, the latest in a string of digital publications, alternative weeklies, and local media sites that remain difficult or impossible to access due to ownership decisions". Vox Media stated a content management system transition led to older articles no longer being accessible and that they do not "have a solution for publicly maintaining the Curbed archive".
