= Joshua Ozersky =

American food writer (1967–2015)

- Born: August 22, 1967; Miami, Florida, U.S.
- Died: May 4, 2015 (aged 47); Chicago, Illinois, U.S.
- Education: Rutgers University; New York University
- Spouses: Cynthia Kachelmyer (m. 1997–2001); Danit Lidor (m. 2010)
- Writing career
- Notable awards: James Beard Award for New York Magazine's Grub Street blog
- Website: Official website

Joshua Ozersky (August 22, 1967 – May 4, 2015) was an American food writer and historian. He first came to prominence as a founding editor of New York magazine's food blog, Grub Street, for which he received a James Beard Foundation Award (with co-editor Daniel Maurer) in 2008. He was the author of several books, including The Hamburger: A History (2008 ISBN 0-300-11758-2), Colonel Sanders and the American Dream (2003 ISBN 0292723822) and Archie Bunker's America: TV in an Era of Change, 1968–1978 (March 2003 ISBN 0-8093-2507-1). He was Editor-at-Large for Esquire, writing about food and restaurants. He also wrote frequently for The Wall Street Journal, Food & Wine, and The New York Observer, among other places. Although read primarily as a food writer, he has said in numerous public appearances that he disliked "food writing" as such, and that his strongest influences were G. K. Chesterton, Thomas Babington Macaulay and A. J. Liebling.

== Early life and background ==
Ozersky was born in Miami in 1967. He moved to Atlantic City, New Jersey, in 1979 when his father, the painter David Ozersky, got a job as a stage technician in the first of the area's casino-hotels, Resorts International. He attended Atlantic City High School and Rutgers University. His mother, Anita Ozersky, died suddenly when he was 14 years of age. Of his interest in food, he has said in interviews, "I was a friendless child, and a solitary and celibate teenager ... my father and I only spoke about movies and food, and food far more than movies. He was a great gastronome and taught me to self-medicate my loneliness with steaks and sausages." He later attended New York University's School of Journalism and started work towards a doctoral degree at the University of Notre Dame, where he eventually received a master's degree in American history.

== Career ==
After graduating from Rutgers University in 1989, Ozersky wrote for several publications on media and cultural history topics, most frequently in Tikkun. The first articles he was paid to write appeared in a short-lived satirical weekly called "The Hoboken Review," based in Hoboken, NJ, where Ozersky lived at the time. Among his earliest works for The Hoboken Review was an article titled, "I like it greasy," in which he celebrates his disdain for overly-health-conscious eating—a recurring theme in his future food writing. From 1990 to 1993 he wrote two weekly columns for the West Side Spirit, a free weekly newspaper in New York City: a semi-humorous "TV Picks" column and a cheap-eats column called "The Impoverished Gourmand" under the name "Casper Gutman." Many consider this guise, which was loosely based on the character from The Maltese Falcon, as a forerunner of "Mr. Cutlets," his later fictive persona. In the mid-1990s, he wrote for Suck.com under the name "The Boob", as well as for Newsday, where he frequently contributed essays on culture and media. His book "Archie Bunker's America: TV in an Era of Change" (2003 ISBN 0-8093-2507-1), a cultural history of television programming, received a disappointing critical reception. Although his ambition at this time was to establish himself as a public intellectual after the example of his mentors, Neil Postman and Mark Crispin Miller, he eventually turned to food writing full-time with the publication of his 2003 book "Meat Me in Manhattan" (ISBN 0-9703125-7-1). 2008's "The Hamburger: A History" (ISBN 0-300-11758-2) was a critical success, receiving positive reviews in publications on both sides of the Atlantic, including The Economist, The Times, The Observer and Forbes.

Subsequent to "Meat Me in Manhattan"'s publication, Ozersky was a contributing restaurant critic for Newsday (2004–2006), and wrote regularly for the website Slashfood and the New York Law Journal. He became the founding editor of New York Magazine food blog Grub Street, a position he held until 2008, when he moved over to Citysearch as National Restaurant Editor. There he ran a daily food blog based on the model of Grub Street called The Feedbag, along with his regular Citysearch duties. He left in 2009 to start Ozersky.TV, a venture with Eater founder Ben Leventhal, featuring short films about restaurants and cooking, which debuted in July 2010. He wrote the "Taste of America" column for Time from 2010 to 2012. Both Ozersky TV, "Taste of America," and his work in The Wall Street Journal was nominated for James Beard Awards. Essays by Ozersky were also included in "The Best Food Writing" anthologies of 2009, 2012 and 2014.

In 2010, Ozersky was criticized by Robert Sietsema for writing about his wedding in Time without disclosing that the chefs who participated donated the food as wedding gifts. Ozersky defended himself, saying that the chefs involved were among his closest friends, and that the most prominent of them, Michael White, had his daughter in the wedding party as a flower girl.

== Death ==
Ozersky was found and pronounced dead in his Conrad Chicago hotel room on May 4, 2015, while in the city for the James Beard Foundation Awards. Officials said the autopsy reveals he died after suffering a seizure in the hotel shower and drowned.

== Meatopia ==
Ozersky was the founder of Meatopia, a large meat-centric outdoor culinary event, which has been held in New York City for the past ten years. In 2013 Meatopia events were held in London, England and San Antonio, Texas, with more cities planned for 2014. Meatopia held a very small event in 2013 in New York City while focusing the majority of its efforts on the London and Texas events. Each year has had a different theme such as "Slaughter of the Innocent" (baby animals); "Lamb Bam Thank You M'aam" (whole lambs); "City Meat," (NYC 2012) in which the festival was divided up into multiple "neighborhoods" such as Offalwood, Carcass Hill, and Beaktown; and most recently (NYC 2014) The Carnivore's Ball, a celebration of the 10th annual Meatopia which was hosted by Michael Symon. Meatopia has been called "a glorious city of meat" by The Huffington Post and "a bacchanal of pork, beef, lamb, chicken, duck, turkey and quail" by The New York Times.

== Bibliography ==
- Colonel Sanders and the American Dream May 2013 (ISBN 0292723822)
- The Hamburger: A History May 2009 (ISBN 0-300-11758-2)
- Meat Me in Manhattan: A Carnivore's Guide to New York October 2003 (ISBN 0-9703125-7-1)
- Zagat Long Island Restaurants 2005–06 May 2005 (ISBN 978-1-57006-714-3)
- Readings for the 21st Century: Tomorrow's Issue for Today's Students / Edition 3 August 1996 (ISBN 978-0-205-19803-0)
- Aquarius Super Day-by-Day Horoscope 1990
- Archie Bunker's America: TV in an Era of Change 1968–1978 March 2003 (ISBN 0-8093-2507-1)
