= Lockhart Steele =

American blogger and journalist

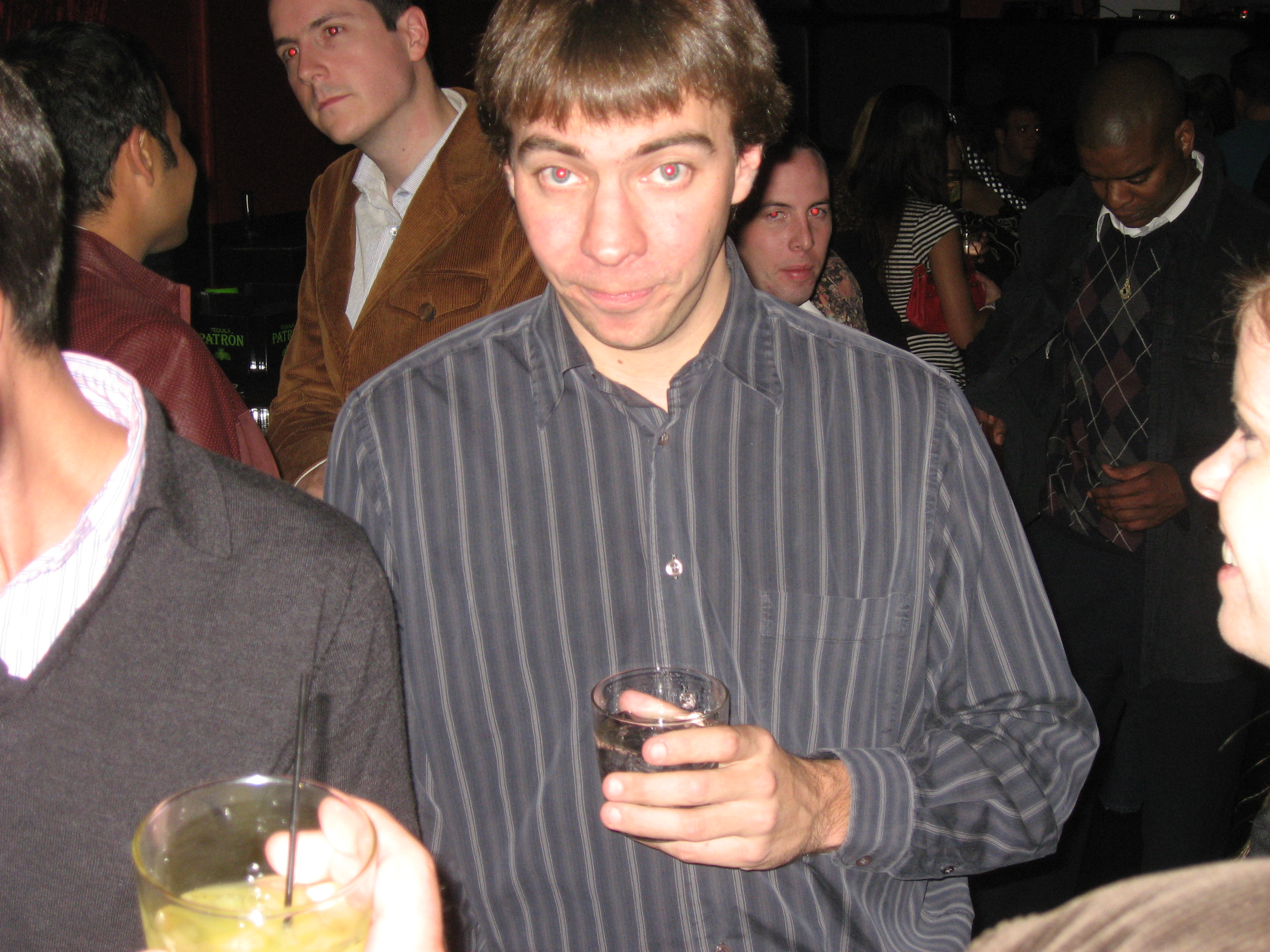
- Steele in 2006
- Born: 1973 or 1974 (age 51–52); Beverly, Massachusetts, U.S.
- Occupation(s): Blogger, journalist
- Known for: Curbed

Lockhart Steele is an American blogger best known for the Curbed family of real estate, restaurant, and shopping news sites.

== Early life and career ==
Lockhart Steele was raised in Manchester-by-the-Sea, Massachusetts. He graduated from St. Paul's School in 1992 and later, from Brown University. In his senior year, he self-published a compendium of the band Phish—The Pharmer's Almanac—with a classmate. It became a bible for the band's international followers and printed five editions before selling to Penguin Press.

Steele moved to the Lower East Side of Manhattan in February 2001 and built a personal blog with short news on New York's social scene. Within three years, his site was popular mainly for its New York real estate posts on apartments and restaurants, with 3,000 daily page views. He moved these posts to Curbed.com in May 2004 and by early next year, left his job at the real estate magazine Cottages & Gardens, where he was an editor, to pursue blogging. He became managing editor at Gawker Media, which was known for its successful blogging business model, and managed its 11 blogs, including its New York and Washington media gossip sites. Steele eventually split Curbed's restaurant posts to Eater.com (2005) and shopping posts to Racked.com (2007). Vox Media purchased Steele's sites in late 2013 for an undisclosed price between $20 and 30 million in cash and stock.

== Sexual harassment allegations ==
Steele was fired from his job as Vox Media's Editorial Director in October 2017, over allegations of sexual harassment. The firing occurred several days after former Vox Media employee Eden Rohatensky published a post on Medium.com describing being sexually harassed by a supervisor. Although Rohatensky did not name the company or the people involved in the post, Vox Media CEO Jim Bankoff referred specifically to "issues raised by a former employee in a post on Medium" in a statement to employees announcing Steele's termination. Bankoff also stated that Steele had "admitted engaging in conduct that is inconsistent with our core values and is not tolerated at Vox Media."
