= ChestEze =

Pharmaceutical product

ChestEze (or Do-Do ChestEze) is a British over-the-counter pharmaceutical product manufactured by Novartis for "relief of bronchial cough, wheezing, breathlessness and other symptoms of asthmatic bronchitis and to clear the chest of mucus following upper respiratory tract infection." It contains 30 mg caffeine, 18.31 mg ephedrine hydrochloride and 100 mg anhydrous theophylline.

It comes in a fawn brown tablet. Recommended doses are: Adults: not more than 1 tablet in 4 hours. Maximum 4 tablets in 24 hours. Young persons over 12 years: 1 tablet and no more than 3 tablets daily with an interval of at least 4 hours between each tablet.

Because ChestEze contains ephedrine, it is sometimes used illicitly in large doses by bodybuilders. This use can be dangerous, however, since theophylline can be toxic at relatively low doses.

In 2008, changes in the law regarding supply of ephedrine and pseudoephedrine-containing medicines resulted in ChestEze being withdrawn from pharmacies in the bulk 30 pack size. It is still available without prescription in the 9 pack size at the pharmacist's discretion from most UK Pharmacies.

On 15 August 2015 ChestEze became discontinued and is no longer available to purchase.
