= The Strategist =

American shopping advice website

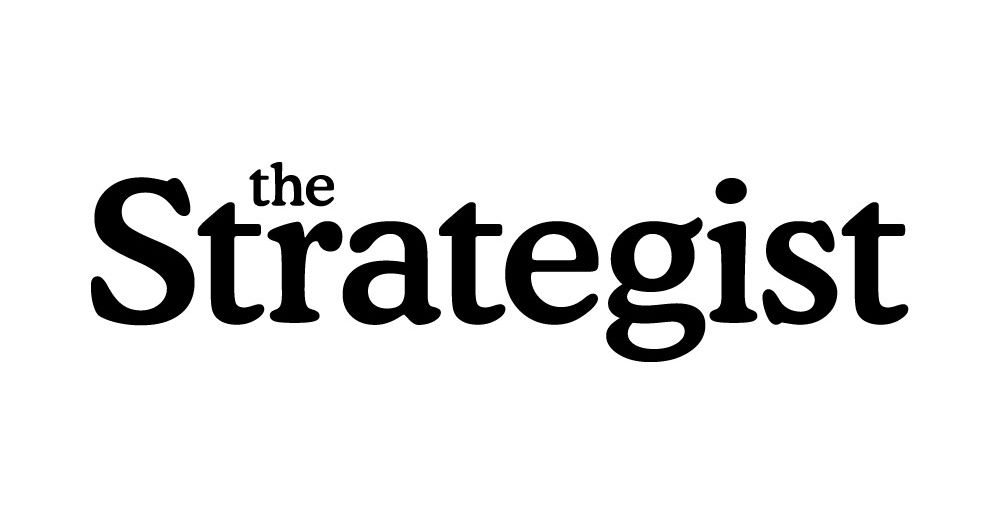
- Owner: Vox Media
- Founded: 2016; 10 years ago
- Website: https://nymag.com/strategist

The Strategist is a product review website published by New York Magazine. Launched online in 2016, the site takes its name from New York's six-time National Magazine Award–winning print service section.

== History ==
The Strategist first appeared as a 22-page print section of New York Magazine in 2004, as "a section that mixes utility and fantasy, dizzyingly high prices and dirt-cheap bargains, hard information and guilty pleasures." In 2016, the Strategist launched online as a standalone e-commerce site that "includes testimonials from editors at The Strategist and sibling New York sites on their favorite products from e-tailers across the web." Early stories included a review of Charleston Shoe Co.'s Monterey Sandal, which led to over $40,000 in sales in two days for the South Carolina-based company.

In October 2018, the Strategist experimented with a holiday pop-up store in New York's SoHo neighborhood, called "I Found It at The Strategist." In September 2019, the Strategist's website was redesigned "to better showcase the breadth of the site by highlighting our columnists, lifting up packages and themes, and elevating time-sensitive pieces like sales." Also in 2019, the Strategist's then-parent company, New York Media, merged with Vox Media. In July 2020, the Strategist launched its annual Two-Day (Actually-Good) Sale, with dozens of exclusive discounts on products the site has previously covered. In 2021, the Strategist launched Best in Class, its series of carefully chosen, rigorously vetted flagship shopping guides. Other popular columns include What I Can't Live Without, in which celebrities share the handful of products they rely on daily, and This Thing's Incredible, which are "odes" from writers to specific items they love, including details on how they discovered them. The Strategist is well known for its gift guides. In 2022 and 2023, the Strategist published a holiday gift catalog on the flip side of New York Magazine's own biweekly edition.

As of 2024, the site covers year-round gifting, sales, beauty, home, kitchen and dining, kids and babies, style, tech and electronics, travel, and wellness, with a staff of 29 writers and editors. It has three weekly newsletters, including the Secret Strategist, launched in July 2023, and the Strategist Beauty Brief, launched in September 2023. The website has had a number of well-known columnists over the years, including beauty columnist Rio Viera-Newton, men's beauty columnist Buzz Bissinger, columnist Chris Black, and gifting columnist Amy Sedaris.

== Approach ==
The Strategist has been described as having "influence on a certain type of metropolitan shopper," with product recommendations that are "deeply rooted in voice-driven reporting." It has also been called "Consumer Reports for the young and savvy, with advice both from NYMag's editors and from experts they deem worthy."

The Strategist's business model is built around affiliate revenue, but editorial decisions are made without influence from the business side. A representative of New York told Vox's The Goods, "If a brand sends The Strategist an unsolicited product and we choose to cover it, the piece will disclose it was a gift ... Sending The Strategist products doesn't guarantee coverage. When writers are reviewing products, they either buy them and expense them, call in items for review (which the review itself will always disclose), or get loaners from brands. If the loaner is an item that can't be returned, the post will disclose it was a gift to New York Media."

== Awards ==
The Strategist was named Hottest in E-commerce on Adweek's 2021 Hot List, which noted, "Clever, stylish and with just a touch of lip, The Strategist has elevated the tedious world of product recommendations into high art." The Strategist has won seven Commerce Awards for Publishers from Skimlinks, including Best Editorial Brand in 2019 and Best BIPOC-Owned Business Article in 2021.
