= The Dodo (magazine) =

American military humor newspaper

- Founded: 1957
- Country: United States
- Language: English

The Dodo was a satirical, sometimes underground military humor magazine published by cadets at the United States Air Force Academy. It poked fun at Air Force and Academy policies and leadership, and was often very cynical in nature. The magazine's name is a play on the Academy's official mascot, the falcon.

Since its founding in 1957, The Dodo went through cycles of legitimacy. At times it has been sanctioned and censored by Academy leadership. Other times, the attitude of the magazine has led to it being banned outright—usually driving publication underground.

== eDodo ==
In the mid-90s, censorship of The Dodo drove the development of an online version of the magazine called eDodo, run by graduates who were no longer subject to the military authority at the Academy. The eDodo bulletin boards were frequented by Academy graduates, cadets, and at least a handful of non-graduates, but Academy officials publicly distanced themselves from the eDodo.

Access to eDodo was eventually blocked at the Academy by the 10th Communications Squadron.
