= Widodo =

Widodo is an Indonesian surname and may refer to:

== Surname ==
- Christian Widodo, Indonesian politician
- Eugenia Diva Widodo, Indonesian wushu practitioner
- Iriana Joko Widodo, former first lady of Indonesia
- Joko Widodo (born 1961), President of Indonesia (2014–2024), Governor of Jakarta (2012–2014), Mayor of Surakarta (2005–2012)
- Makmur Widodo (born 1945), Indonesian diplomat
- Kalimanto Tulus Widodo (1965–2025), Indonesian cyclist
- Rudi Widodo (born 1983), Indonesian football player

== Given name ==
- Widodo Budidarmo, Indonesian National Police chief
- Widodo Adi Sutjipto (born 1944), Indonesian admiral
- Widodo Cahyono Putro (born 1970), Indonesian football player
