= Dodo (automobile company) =

Automobile manufacturer

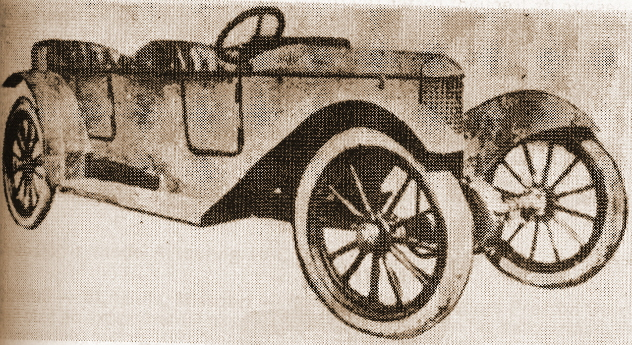
1912 DODO Cyclecar

The DODO (spelled all caps.) was a cyclecar built in 1912, in Detroit, Michigan.

== History ==
The DODO was designed by a young engineer named Karl Probst. It was a two-seater tandem cyclecar. The prototype had a 56" tread, but Probst wanted to slim it to 32". However, a production vehicle never was made. Later, Probst became one of the principal engineers in development of the World War II Jeep while working at the American Bantam company.

=== Model ===
| Year | Engine | HP | Wheelbase | Layout |
|---|---|---|---|---|
| 1912 | two-cylinder | 9 | 100 in (2,540 mm) | FF |
