= Dodo (name) =

Dodo is a given name and a surname. It may refer to:

Given name:

- Dodo Bin Khafef Soomro III, ruler of Sindh
- Dodo Chichinadze (1924–2009), Georgian film and theater actress
- Dodo of Cons, medieval nobleman and crusader
- Dodo Dokou, Beninese footballer
- Dodo zu Innhausen und Knyphausen (1583–1636), Field Marshal of Sweden
- Dodo von Knyphausen (1641–1698), official of Brandenburg-Prussia
- Dodo, Prince Yu (1614–1649), Manchu prince and general
- Dodo Maheri, Pakistani politician

Surname:

- Asako Dodo (born 1967), Japanese voice actress
- Big John Dodo (c. 1910–2003), Indigenous Australian artist
- Gabriel Dodo Ndoke, Cameroonian tax auditor and politician
- George Jonathan Dodo, Nigerian Roman Catholic prelate
- Ibrahim Muhammad Dodo, American rapper known as Hunxho
- Dodo Kuranosuke (died 1560), Japanese samurai
- Mor Dodo (died 609), Syriac Orthodox bishop
- Shunji Dodo (born 1947), Japanese photographer
