= Grub Street (website) =

Food blog published by New York magazine

- Website type: Blog
- Founded: September 18, 2006
- Headquarters: {{{location_country}}}
- Owner: New York Media
- Creator: New York
- Founders: Josh Ozersky, Daniel Maurer
- Website: www.grubstreet.com

Grub Street is a blog about food and restaurants in the United States. It was launched by New York magazine in September 2006 and was led by food writer Josh Ozersky.

Created as a New York-centric blog, Grub Street expanded in January 2009 and covered food in Los Angeles, San Francisco, Boston, Philadelphia and Chicago. In 2013, Grub Street shut down all of its food blogs outside New York and expanded its coverage nationally.

== History ==
To expand its online presence, New York magazine launched Grub Street on September 18, 2006, as a blog about food. The blog was led by Josh Ozersky and featured daily food content, reader commentary, service journalism, and writings of food critic Adam Platt. One of the blog's founders was journalist Daniel Maurer, who wrote 7,500 posts for Grub Street in a span of five years, significantly increasing its traffic. In 2008, Ozersky together with Maurer won James Beard Foundation Award for multimedia writing on food in Grub Street. He left Grub Street the same year.

In January 2009, Grub Street expanded by hiring new bloggers and launching blogs for Los Angeles, San Francisco, Boston, Philadelphia and Chicago. In addition, Grub Street launched its own website; grubstreet.com. The city blogs were formerly known as the food blog network MenuPages before being acquired by New York Media in 2008 and made part of Grub Street brand.

In September 2010, two editors departured from Grub Street, including food writer Helen Rosner. In May 2013, Grub Street announced it was shutting down of all of its food blogs outside of New York and redirecting their websites to grubstreet.com. The blog said it would begin covering stories nationally while continuing to cover New York-specific content due to their offices being located there. On May 4, 2015, Josh Ozersky died due to an accident. In September 2018, as part of New York's expansion of its literature coverage, Grub Street began publishing new content, such as lists of cookbooks and excerpts from chef and restaurant memoirs.

== Reception ==
In March 2008, Benji Lanyado of The Guardian called Grub Street an "arch rival to Eater". In April 2010, Grub Street was described by Westchester Magazine as a "foodie blog". In May 2013, Josh Ozersky wrote in Observer.com: "I have never felt the kind of pressure I did when I was helming Grub Street". He also praised editor Daniel Maurer because he "picked up the slack and never missed a beat" as the blog competed with Eater and Serious Eats for post frequency.

In October 2017, Nabeel Chollampat of The Michigan Daily, called Grub Street Diet, a weekly feature in Grub Street which republishes culinary diaries of various people, the "best thing to read on the internet". However, he noted that some of the stories were "bland" and written by people who weren't food writers. In June 2019, Leah Finnegan of The Outline criticized Grub Street for covering Los Angeles, even though most readers of the blog, including her, are living in New York. She called it an "insult to its base" and "totally nonsensical".

In August 2026, Rachel O'Donoghue of Algemeiner Journal criticized Grub Street editor Madeline Leung Coleman for writing an article discussing the politics of Arab and Israeli restaurants in New York City. O'Donoghue criticized her for saying that Israel is committing genocide without explaining what happened during October 7 attacks and referring to Israel as “the land mass currently called Israel”.

== Awards ==
In May 2011, Grub Street won James Beard Foundation Award for Group Food Blog. In March 2015, James Beard Foundation nominated Grub Street for Group Food Blog award. The blog won the award in April 2015.
