= Native video =

Video delivery format

Native video is video that is uploaded to or created on social networks and played in-feed, as opposed to links to videos hosted on other sites.

Native video formats are specific to each social platform and are designed to maximize video engagement (i.e. number of views), discovery and distribution. For instance, Facebook native videos are distributed directly onto user feeds. YouTube videos, while also shown within a user feed, may be searched through the use of keywords.

The most widely used native video platforms include TikTok and YouTube.
