= Dodo (painter) =

German painter (1907–1998)

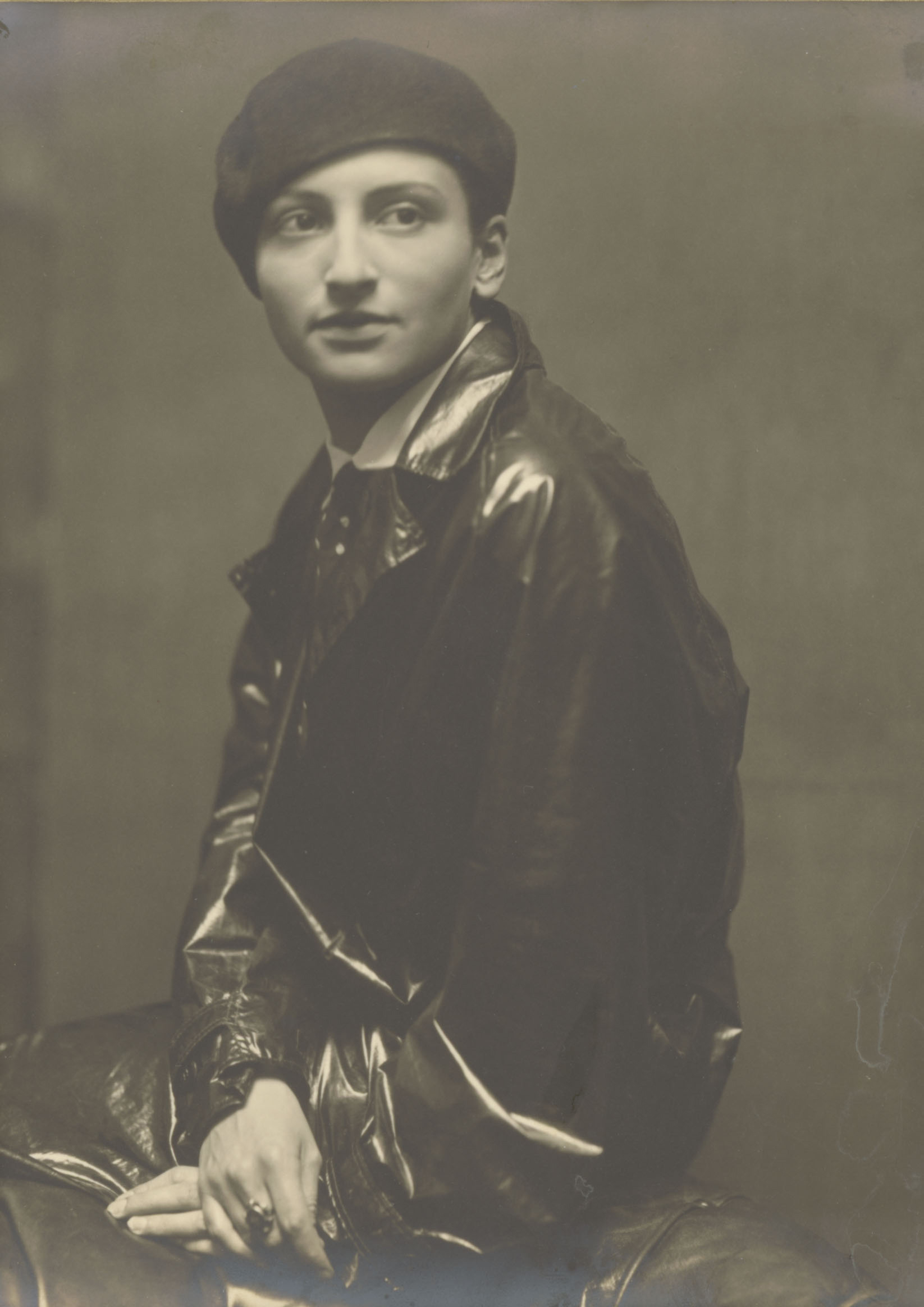
Dodo 1928.jpg

Dodo, born as Dörte Clara Wolff (10 February 1907 – 22 December 1998), was a German painter and illustrator of the New Objectivity.

== Life and work ==
Dörte Wolff was brought up in a comfortable upper middle-class Jewish environment in Berlin. From 1923 to 1926, she studied art and fashion illustration at the prestigious Schule Reimann for artists and designers. She initially worked mainly as a fashion illustrator and also designed costumes for Marlene Dietrich and Diseuse Margo Lion in Mischa Spoliansky's Revue Es liegt in der Luft (text by Marcellus Schiffer), which premiered in 1928. From early on, she used to sign her works as DODO or DoDo. Dodo reached the peak of her artistic career between 1927 and 1930 with caustic genre scenes of Weimar Republic's glamorous high society. More than 60 of her intensely colourful gouaches, narrating the sophisticated life of the modern urbanite and the increasing estrangement of the sexes, were published in the German satirical magazine ULK.

In 1929, Dodo married the Jewish lawyer and notary Hans Bürgner (1882–1974); the couple had two children, Anja and Thomas Ulrich. 1933 she met Carl Gustav Jung-disciple Gerhard Adler (1904–1988) with whom she fell in love. She followed him to Zürich, where she was analyzed by Toni Wolff (1888–1953), Jung's close companion, at the Psychiatrische Universitätsklinik Zürich, also known as Burghölzli Klinik. Dodo expressed her dreams in her works, a sequence of watercolours which she characterized as "unconscious paintings". From 1934, Dodo could only work for Jewish publications, such as the Jüdische Rundschau, who frequently published her Bible illustrations, theatre scenes or drawings for children.

In 1936, Dodo emigrated to London, where she married Gerhard Adler after having been divorced from Bürgner. Her divorce from Adler followed in 1938 and Dodo and Hans Bürgner remarried in 1945. In her exile, Dodo illustrated children's books, designed greeting cards for Raphael Tuck & Sons and worked for Paris House London. Post war, she drew still lives, landscapes and nude studies. In addition, she completed a range of tapestries according to her own design.

Dodo's work had almost faded into obscurity; its art historic significance was discovered in the autumn of 2009 by Renate Krümmer, art collector and art dealer. In co-operation with Dodo's estate and Krümmer, Adelheid Rasche from the National Museums of Berlin, curated the first monographic exhibition Dodo (1907-1998) - A Life in Pictures.

== Book illustrations ==
- Max Samter: Die Versuchung. Eine Erzählung. Textzeichnungen von Dodo Bürgner. Vortrupp-Verlag, Berlin 1934.
- Frieda Mehler: Feiertags-Märchen. Zeichnungen von Dodo Bürgner. Levy, Berlin 1935.
- Gertrude M. Salinger: Keep-Fit Singing Games. Illustrated by Dodo Adler. Evans Brothers, London 1938.
- Joan Haslip: Fairy Tales from the Balkans. Pictures by Dodo Adler. Collins, London & Glasgow 1943.
- Gladys Malvern: The Dancing Star. Illustrated by Dodo Adler. Collins, London 1944.
- Gertrude M. Salinger: Good Fun Singing Games. Illustrated by Dodo Adler. Ed. J. Burrow & Co., London 1947.

== Exhibitions ==
The first exhibition of Dodo's works took place 1 March 2012 to 28 May 2012 in the Staatliche Museen zu Berlin / Kulturforum.

Her works were shown 22 June 2012 to 9 September 2012 in London in the exhibition The Inspiration of Decadence. Dodo Rediscovered: Berlin to London 1907-1998 at the Ben Uri Gallery, The London Jewish Museum of Art.

== Literature ==
- Renate Krümmer (Ed.): Dodo: Life and Work 1907–1998, Hatje Cantz, Ostfildern 2012. ISBN 978-3-7757-3275-8.
