= Jim Bankoff =

American media executive

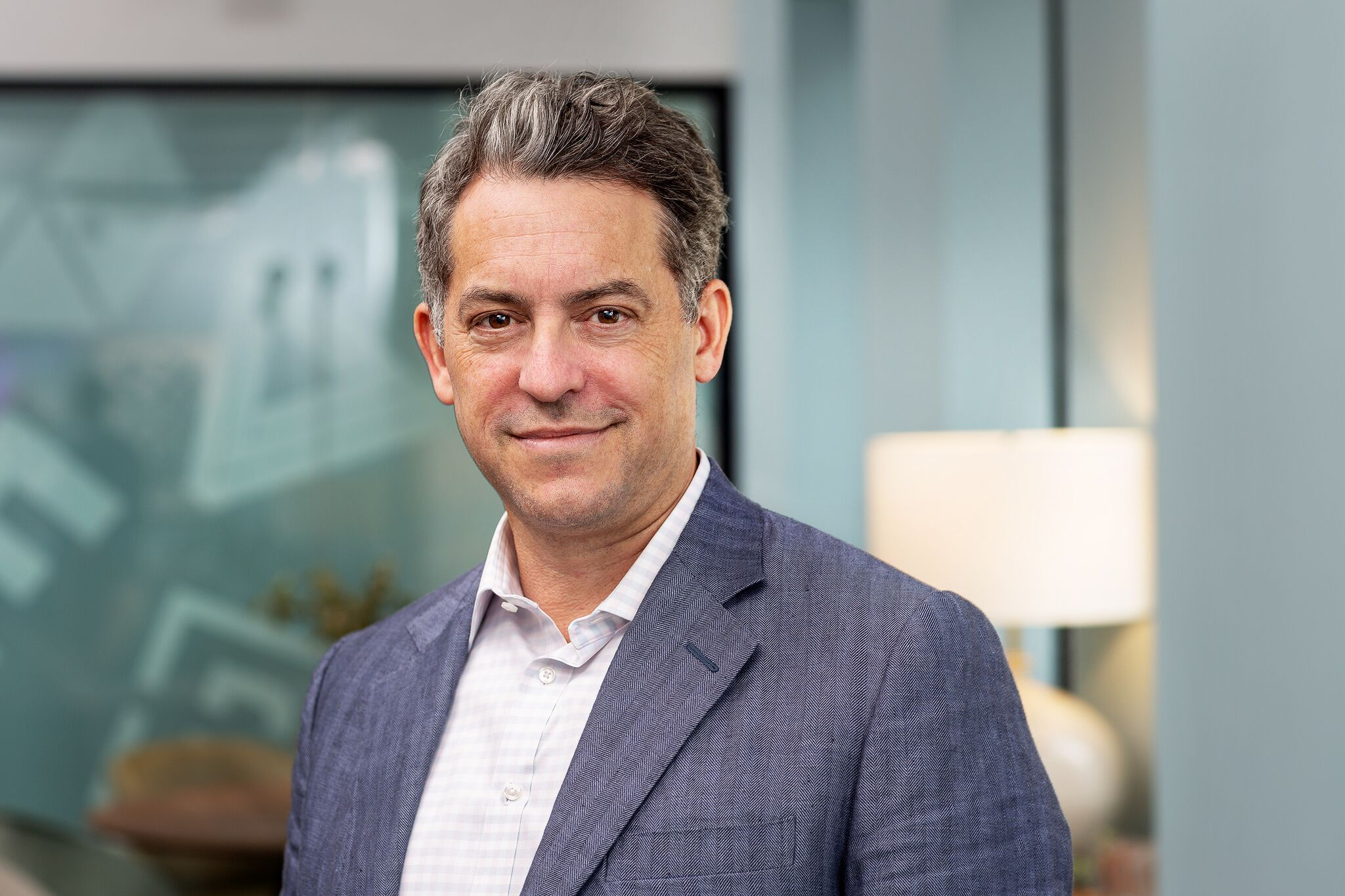
- Bankoff in July 2018
- Born: James Philip Bankoff; December 23, 1969 (age 56); United States
- Education: Emory University (BA); University of Pennsylvania (MBA)
- Occupations: Chairman and CEO of Vox Media
- Spouse: Diane Elson (m. 2003)

James Philip Bankoff (born December 23, 1969) is an American media executive who is the co-founder, chairman, and chief executive officer (CEO) of Vox Media. He previously worked for AOL and joined Vox Media's predecessor, SB Nation, in 2009.

== Early life and education ==
Bankoff was born to Marvin and Adrienne Bankoff on December 23, 1969, and raised in Upper Saddle River, New Jersey, a primarily Jewish neighborhood. His father owned a jewelry business and his mother worked as an editor. Bankoff developed an interest in media at an early age. He obtained a bachelor's degree in international studies from Emory University. During his senior year, he interned at CNN. Bankoff earned his Master of Business Administration degree at the Wharton School of the University of Pennsylvania.

== Career ==
=== Early career and AOL ===
Bankoff initially worked as a production assistant for the WETA-TV series Washington Week. He also worked at Ruder Finn's Global Public Affairs group, where he became an account supervisor in 1991. After graduating from Wharton, he declined job offers from The New York Times, The Walt Disney Company, and a record company to join AOL in 1995. In various roles, he worked on projects including AIM, AOL.com, AOL Music, FanHouse, MapQuest, Moviefone, and Netscape. He focused on the company's digital content business, helped the company acquire Engadget, and was involved in the creation of TMZ.

Bankoff became director of business development for AOL Greenhouse in 1996. He was named vice-president of strategy and operations for the AOL brand in 1998, and oversaw business strategy, category management, and content acquisition. He also directed AOL Music and AOL Plus. Following the merger of AOL and Netscape, Bankoff became president of Netscape in 2001. He was responsible for business operations and the growth of Netscape.com and Netbusiness. He then served as president of AOL Web Properties, managing AIM, CompuServe, ICQ, MapQuest, Moviefone, and Netscape.

Bankoff held the role of executive vice-president of programming and products from 2002. Bankoff left AOL in late 2006, working as a consultant for The Huffington Post and SB Nation, starting in 2008.

=== SB Nation and Vox Media ===
As an angel investor for SB Nation, Bankoff led the company's first round of financing. He became its chairman and chief executive officer (CEO) in January 2009. He expanded SB Nation's network and number of writers. In November 2011, Bankoff co-founded Vox Media as the parent company for SB Nation and The Verge. As Vox Media's chairman and CEO, Bankoff pursued growing the company through acquisitions. He oversees the company's media brands.

== Accolades ==
In 2015, Bankoff was included in Washingtonian's list of the "100 Top Tech Leaders" in Washington, D.C., and ranked number 18 on Business Insider's "Silicon Alley 100" list of the "coolest, most inspiring people in the New York tech industry". He was also included in The Hollywood Reporter's list of "The 35 Most Powerful People in New York Media" in 2016. Bankoff ranked number 67 on Mediaite's list of the most influential figures in media in 2017.

== Personal life ==
Bankoff and his wife Diane Elson (founder the rug design company Elson&Company in 1998), married at the Wesleyan Methodist Church at Harbour Island on April 26, 2003. Bankoff is a fan of the New York Yankees.
