= Technology journalism =

Journalism genre

Technology journalism is the genre of reporting that concerns the development, marketing, and application of technology. The field covers a wide variety of topics, including communications, artificial intelligence, the Internet, social media, the IT industry, scientific research, robotics, and laws and policies regarding the digital world. Many news organizations feature prominent coverage of technology, especially as pertains to the economic, political, and cultural role of Big Tech companies and products.

== History ==
Early developments in the Information Age were often covered by established news organizations under the umbrella of science journalism. The MIT Technology Review, first published in 1899 as the Massachusetts Institute of Technology's alumni magazine, began pivoting toward objective reporting on the technology industry in the late 1920s.

As inventions such as personal computers and data storage devices became more ubiquitous and commercially accessible, some journalists began focusing on the nascent computer industry. Early tech reporters included John Battelle, John Markoff, Kara Swisher, Walt Mossberg, and Steven Levy. In the 1980s and 1990s, some magazines were founded to report specifically on technology, often from a consumer orientation; these included PCMag, Wired, and Sound & Vision, which focused specifically on digital television. Some early exclusively digital publications focused on technology, such as Gizmodo and TechCrunch.

Technology journalism has grown in prominence in the 21st century. Most major news organizations have a desk dedicated to technology, and some operate bureaus based in Silicon Valley, where many technology companies are headquartered. Tech journalists have broken major stories that shaped public perception of the industry and led to significant court cases, including John Carreyrou's investigation into the medical startup Theranos and CoinDesk's reporting on fraud at the cryptocurrency exchange FTX.

== Subgenres ==
The increasing market power of technology companies, especially in the United States and China, has meant modern technology journalism often falls under the umbrella of business journalism, including as pertains to tech companies' treatment of workers, marketing strategies, and involvement in the political sphere. Some tech journalists investigate tech companies' activities, revealing undisclosed details on topics such as information privacy protocols, data security, and the right to repair.

Because many hardware and software products are oriented toward consumers, general-audience tech publications often combine reporting with service journalism, offering readers insights on new tech products and sometimes recommendations on which to purchase. Beginning as a cable television channel and ultimately a website, CNET has long focused on offering perspective on new technology products. Broader product review websites such as Wirecutter and The Strategist offer independent recommendations funded by affiliate links, which offer publications a commission when they refer a consumer who ultimately makes a purchase. Close relationships between tech journalists and the companies they cover have sometimes led to concerns about uncritical reporting on industry claims.

Some technology journalists also cover culture, especially those focusing on digital communities and social media. The "internet culture" beat often overlaps with celebrity and entertainment coverage, especially as pertains to reporting on influencers and other prominent figures who are predominantly known for their online presence. Video game journalism incorporates a synthesis of business reporting on game companies and games' reception in popular culture.

== See also ==
- Business journalism
- Environmental journalism
- Public awareness of science
- Science journalism
- Video game journalism
