= Dude (disambiguation) =

Dude is an American slang term for an individual, usually male.

Dude or Dudes may also refer to:

== People ==
- Chester A. Arthur (1829–1886), President of the United States nicknamed the "Dude President"
- Dan the Dude (fl. c. 1905–1915), New York City criminal and cafe owner
- Devin the Dude (born 1970), American musician
- Gustavo Dudamel (born 1981), Venezuelan musician nicknamed "the Dude"
- Dude Esterbrook (1857–1901), American Major League Baseball player
- Dude Harlino (born 1980), Indonesian actor
- Dude Mowrey (born 1972), American country music singer
- Dude Love (born 1965), ring name for former American professional wrestler Mick Foley

== Fictional characters ==
- Dan the Dude, played by Arthur Stone in the 1928 silent film Me, Gangster based on the actual Dan the Dude
- Dude Lester, in the 1932 novel Tobacco Road and the 1941 film adaptation
- Dave the Dude, hero of the film Lady for a Day (1933) and its remake, Pocketful of Miracles (1961)
- The Dude, in the Western film Rio Bravo, played by Dean Martin
- Dr. Dude, from the pinball machine Dr. Dude and His Excellent Ray (1990)
- Jeffrey "the Dude" Lebowski, protagonist of the film The Big Lebowski (1998)
- Dude, a character in the 2021 film Free Guy

== Music ==
- The Dudes, a Canadian band
- Th' Dudes, a New Zealand band
- Dude (musical), 1972
- The Dude (Quincy Jones album), 1981
- The Dude (Devin the Dude album), 1998
- Dudes (David Mead album), 2011
- "Dude (Looks Like a Lady)", a 1987 song by Aerosmith
- "Dude" (Beenie Man song), 2004
- "Dude" (Lethal Bizzle and Stormzy song), 2015
- Dude (soundtrack), soundtrack album by Sai Abhyankkar to the 2025 film of the same name

== Other uses ==
- Dodge D Series, a 1970s line of pickup trucks known as the Dude
- Dude River, Romania
- Dude (2018 film), an American film
- Dude (2025 film), an Indian Tamil-language film
- Dudes (film), a 1987 punk rock Western film
- The Dude (magazine), a men's magazine of the 1950s
- "The Dude", former branding of North Carolina radio station WYAY (FM)
- Discrete Universal Denoiser (DUDE), a denoising scheme in information theory and signal processing
- Baxter Street Dudes, an 1870s New York City teenage street gang

== See also ==
- Dudesy, a comedy podcast
