= Haim Permuter =

Israeli electrical engineering scientist

- חיים פרמוטר
- Education: Ben Gurion University, Stanford
- Awards: IEEE fellow, the Luck-Hille chair in electrical engineering
- Scientific career
- Fields: Electrical Engineering
- Workplaces: Ben Gurion University
- Thesis: (2008)
- Doctoral advisor: Tsachy Weissman and Thomas Cover

Haim Henry Permuter (Hebrew: חיים הנרי פרמוטר; born 1975) is an Israeli electrical engineering scientist. He is a professor in the School of Electrical and Computer Engineering at Ben-Gurion University of the Negev (BGU), where he holds the Luck-Hille chair in electrical engineering.

Permuter's research investigates the limits of data transfer in communication systems using information theory, machine learning and optimization. He is an IEEE fellow.

== Early life and education ==
Haim Permuter was born in Romania and immigrated to Israel with his family in 1982.

Permuter received B.Sc (summa cum laude) and M.Sc degrees in electrical engineering from Ben‑Gurion University. He earned his Ph.D degree from Stanford University in 2008 under the supervision of Prof. Tsachy Weissman and Prof. Thomas Cover.

== Academic career ==
Permuter joined the Electrical Engineering department at Ben-Gurion University in 2008 as a tenure-track department member. He became an associate professor in 2013 and a full professor in 2017.

From 2012, Permuter has served as the head of the communication, cyber and information track in the department.

Permuter was also an associate editor of IEEE Transactions on Information Theory (2013-2016 and 2022-2025).

Permuter has supervised several graduate students who subsequently pursued academic careers, including Ziv Goldfeld, an associate professor at Cornell University; Oron Sabag, a senior lecturer at the Hebrew University of Jerusalem; Ziv Aharoni, a postdoctoral associate at Duke University and Ohad Elishco, an assistant professor at Ben-Gurion University of the Negev.

Permuter authored over 200 scientific publications in journals and conferences.

== Research ==
Permuter’s theoretical work focuses on characterizing the fundamental limits of communication, particularly for channels with memory, feedback, cooperation, and secrecy, while developing tools to model complex real-world systems.

In recent years, he has applied machine learning to estimate information-theoretic quantities and solve problems in channel capacity.

== Selected articles ==
- R. Hirsch, Z. Aharoni, H. D. Pfister, H. H. Permuter (2026). "Neural Polar Decoders for Receivers in Wireless Communication". IEEE Transactions on Communications 74, 6889-6903
- Z. Aharoni, B. Huleihel, H. D. Pfister, H. H. Permuter (2024). "Data-driven neural polar decoders for unknown channels with and without memory". IEEE Transactions on Information Theory 70 (12), 8495-8510
- D. Tsur, Z. Aharoni, Z. Goldfeld, H. H. Permuter (2023). "Neural estimation and optimization of directed information over continuous spaces". IEEE Transactions on Information Theory 69 (8), 4777-4798
- P. W. Cuff, H. H. Permuter, T.M. Cover (2010). "Coordination capacity". IEEE Transactions on Information Theory 56 (9), 4181-4206
- H. H. Permuter, P. Cuff, B. Van Roy, T. Weissman (2008). "Capacity of the trapdoor channel with feedback". IEEE Transactions on Information Theory 54 (7), 3150-3165
- H. H. Permuter, Y. H. Kim, T. Weissman (2011). "Interpretations of directed information in portfolio theory, data compression, and hypothesis testing". IEEE Transactions on Information Theory 57 (6), 3248-3259
- H. H. Permuter, J. Francos, I. Jermyn (2006 ). "A study of Gaussian mixture models of color and texture features for image classification and segmentation". Pattern recognition 39 (4), 695-706

== Honors and awards ==
Permuter received several awards, including a Fulbright Fellowship, a U.S.-Israel Binational Science Foundation Bergmann Memorial Award and a European Research Council (ERC) grant.

In 2018 he became the incumbent of the Luck-Hille Chair in Electrical Engineering in BGU. In 2026 he was elevated to an IEEE fellow “for contributions to understanding the capacity of channels with feedback and multi-user information theory”.
