= Silicon Valley (TV series) =

2014–2019 American television series

- Genre: Comedy
- Created by: Mike Judge; John Altschuler; Dave Krinsky
- Starring: Thomas Middleditch; T.J. Miller; Josh Brener; Martin Starr; Kumail Nanjiani; Christopher Evan Welch; Amanda Crew; Zach Woods; Matt Ross; Suzanne Cryer; Jimmy O. Yang; Stephen Tobolowsky; Chris Diamantopoulos
- Opening theme: "Stretch Your Face" by Tobacco
- Composer: Jeff Cardoni
- Country of origin: United States
- Original language: English
- No. of seasons: 6
- No. of episodes: 53 (list of episodes)

Production
- Executive producers: Mike Judge; Alec Berg; John Altschuler; Dave Krinsky; Michael Rotenberg; Tom Lassally; Clay Tarver; Jim Kleverweis; Jamie Babbit; Lew Morton
- Producers: Jim Kleverweis; Carrie Kemper; Adam Countee; Alonzo Nevarez; Amy Solomon
- Cinematography: Jim Denault; Tim Suhrstedt
- Editors: Tim Roche; Brian Merken; Al Levine
- Camera setup: Single-camera
- Running time: 28–47 minutes
- Production companies: Judgmental Films; Altschuler Krinsky Works; Alec Berg Inc.; 3 Arts Entertainment; HBO Entertainment

Original release
- Network: HBO
- Release: April 6, 2014 – December 8, 2019

Silicon Valley is an American comedy television series created by Mike Judge, John Altschuler and Dave Krinsky. It premiered on HBO on April 6, 2014, and concluded on December 8, 2019, running for six seasons for a total of 53 episodes. Parodying the culture of the technology industry in Silicon Valley, the series focuses on Richard Hendricks (Thomas Middleditch), a programmer who founds a startup company called Pied Piper, and chronicles his struggles to maintain his company while facing competition from larger entities. Co-stars include T.J. Miller, Josh Brener, Martin Starr, Kumail Nanjiani, Zach Woods, Amanda Crew, Matt Ross, and Jimmy O. Yang.

The series received critical acclaim, with praise for its writing and humor. It was nominated for numerous accolades, including five consecutive Primetime Emmy Award nominations for Outstanding Comedy Series.

== Plot ==
Season	Episodes	Originally released	
Season	Episodes	First released	Last released
1	8	April 6, 2014	June 1, 2014
2	10	April 12, 2015	June 14, 2015
3	10	April 24, 2016	June 26, 2016
4	10	April 23, 2017	June 25, 2017
5	8	March 25, 2018	May 13, 2018
6	7	October 27, 2019	December 8, 2019

=== Season 1 ===
Richard Hendricks, an employee of a tech company named Hooli, creates an app called Pied Piper in his spare time that contains a revolutionary data compression algorithm. Peter Gregory acquires a stake in Pied Piper, and Richard hires the residents of Erlich Bachman's business incubator, including Bertram Gilfoyle and Dinesh Chugtai, along with Jared Dunn, who also defected from Hooli. Meanwhile Richard's best friend, Nelson "Big Head" Bighetti, chooses to accept a substantial promotion at Hooli instead, despite his lack of merit for the job.

Gavin Belson instructs his Hooli employees to reverse engineer Pied Piper and develop a similar product called Nucleus. Both companies are scheduled to present at TechCrunch Disrupt. Pied Piper rushes to produce a feature-rich cloud storage platform based on their compression technology. At the TechCrunch event, Belson presents Nucleus, which is integrated with all of Hooli's services and has compression performance equal to Pied Piper. However, Richard has a new idea and spends the entire night coding. The next morning, he makes Pied Piper's final presentation and demonstrates a product that strongly outperforms Nucleus; he is mobbed by eager investors.

=== Season 2 ===
In the immediate aftermath of their TechCrunch Disrupt victory, multiple venture capital firms offer to finance Pied Piper's Series A round. Peter Gregory has died and is replaced by Laurie Bream to run Raviga Capital. Richard finds out that Hooli is suing Pied Piper for copyright infringement, falsely claiming that Richard developed Pied Piper's compression algorithm on Hooli time using company equipment. As a result, Raviga and all the other VC firms retract their offers. Richard turns down Hooli's buyout and accepts funding from controversial billionaire Russ Hanneman, though Richard quickly begins questioning his decision after learning about Hanneman's mercurial reputation and his excessive interference in day-to-day operations.

Belson promotes Big Head to Hooli [xyz], to make people think he created the compression algorithm and that Richard stole it to create Pied Piper. Belson agrees to drop the lawsuit in favor of binding arbitration to prevent the press from finding out about how bad Nucleus is. Due to a clause in Richard's Hooli contract, the lawsuit is ruled in Pied Piper's favor. Raviga buys out Hanneman's stake in Pied Piper, securing three of Pied Piper's five board seats. However, they decide to remove Richard from the CEO position due to previous incidents.

=== Season 3 ===
After a failed stint with Jack Barker as CEO of Pied Piper, Richard eventually regains his CEO position. Due to Jack wasting all their money on offices and useless marketing, a cash strapped Richard hires contract engineers from around the world to help construct their application platform. Big Head receives a $20 million severance package from Hooli in exchange for non-disclosure and non-disparagement agreements. Big Head uses his money to set up his own incubator and Erlich partners with him. However, because of their spending habits, they declare bankruptcy, and Erlich is forced to sell his stake in Pied Piper to repay the debts. Gavin Belson hires Jack Barker as the new head of development at Hooli.

After release, their platform is positively reviewed by members of the industry. However, only a small fraction of the people installing the platform remain as daily active users due to its complex interface design. Meanwhile, Jared secretly employs a click farm to artificially inflate usage statistics. An anxious Richard reveals the source of the uptick at a Series B funding signing meeting, leading to the deal being scrapped. Laurie no longer wishes for Raviga to be associated with Pied Piper and moves to sell majority control to any investor. Erlich and Big Head are able to buy control of the company after an unexpected windfall from the sale of a blog they bought. Pied Piper now prepares to pivot again, this time to become a video chat company, based on the sudden popularity of Dinesh's video chat application which he included on the platform.

=== Season 4 ===
Richard steps down as CEO of Pied Piper, and instead begins working on a new project: a decentralized, peer-to-peer internet, that would be powered by a network of cell phones without any firewalls, viruses, or government regulations. Gavin Belson is removed as CEO of Hooli after an incident involving COPPA violations from when he seized PiperChat. Jack Barker takes his place as CEO. Gavin temporarily works with Richard, until he has an existential crisis and leaves Palo Alto for Tibet.

Laurie and Monica form their own VC company, Bream-Hall. Big Head becomes a lecturer at Stanford University's Department of Computer Science. Erlich gets into business with Keenan Feldspar, whose VR headset is the Valley's latest sensation. However, Erlich is left out of a signing deal and is abandoned by Feldspar, leaving Erlich disillusioned. Erlich then goes to Tibet to meet with Gavin. Belson eventually returns home, while Erlich stays behind.

Richard gets into business with FGI, an insurance company, who uses Pied Piper for their data storage needs. After a crisis involving FGI's data storage, the team discovers that the decentralized internet is a working concept after the data from their Pied Piper server had backed itself up to Jian-Yang's smart refrigerator, as Gilfoyle used some of the Pied Piper code when he was trying to hack it, which in turn connected itself to a network of other refrigerators like it and distributing the data. Gavin ousts Jack from Hooli and regains his position as CEO. He offers a very generous acquisition deal to Richard, who turns it down and decides to be funded by Bream-Hall.

=== Season 5 ===
The Pied Piper team gets new offices and hires a large team of coders to help work on Richard's new internet. Meanwhile, Jian-Yang manages to convince a judge that Erlich is dead so that he can inherit Erlich's estate, including the idea incubator and the 10% share of Pied Piper. Richard promotes Jared to be the new chief operating officer for Pied Piper, and Jian-Yang goes to China to build a knock-off version of Pied Piper.

Bream-Hall forces Richard to team up with Eklow, an AI team, and Pied Piper puts together a group of developers. When Eklow's CEO almost destroys Pied Piper's credibility, Richard becomes fed up with Laurie and considers using Gilfoyle's idea to create a cryptocurrency for Pied Piper as a way to secure an independent source of funding. After initially opposing the idea, Monica realizes that Laurie plans to make Richard sell ads for his decentralized internet, and warns him. In gratitude, Richard offers her the newly vacated role of CFO at Pied Piper, and she accepts, finally cutting ties with Laurie.

After unimpressive results from their cryptocurrency, Pied Piper is distraught when Laurie teams up with a wealthy Chinese manufacturer, Yao, who had been working with Belson to steal Jian-Yang's Pied Piper patent. Yao and Laurie add users to Pied Piper's network via a large number of newly manufactured phones, and prepare for a 51% attack against Pied Piper's network in order to take control of developing it. Richard asks Belson to put their software onto Hooli's Signature Box 3 network in order to stop Yao and Laurie, and Belson does so, but betrays Richard by teaming up with Laurie and Yao to delete Pied Piper. At the last minute, Pied Piper recruits Colin, another developer betrayed by Laurie, to run his popular video game Gates of Galloo on the Pied Piper network, adding users and allowing Pied Piper to maintain control of enough of the network to block Yao's and Hooli's machines from accessing it. Meanwhile, due to the losses incurred in launching the unsuccessful Signature Box 3, Hooli's board of directors announce plans that force Belson to sell the company to Amazon and Jeff Bezos. PiedPiperCoin gains traction, and the season ends with the Pied Piper team moving into a huge new office space vacated by Hooli.

=== Season 6 ===
Pied Piper has become a large company of 500 employees with Richard speaking before Congress on his ideology of a new internet that does not collect user data. He is shocked to learn that Colin's online game Gates of Galloo, part of the Pied Piper family, has been collecting user data the entire time. Colin refuses to stop, but Pied Piper depends on his game's revenue, so Richard seeks new investment in order to cut Colin loose. He finds shady Chilean billionaire Maximo Reyes, who offers Richard $1 billion. When Richard turns him down, Maximo begins staging a hostile takeover of Pied Piper. Meanwhile, Richard's right-hand man Jared has left Pied Piper to seek new up-and-coming talent in need of his support. Hooli, once a tech giant headed by Richard's rival Gavin Belson, downsizes drastically after most of the company is sold to Amazon. Pied Piper purchases what remains of Hooli, including its subsidiary FoxHole. CFIUS judges foreign ownership of FoxHole to be a threat to national security, and Maximo is forced to sell all of his shares of Pied Piper. Gavin, free from his Hooli position, launches a new campaign for "Tethics" (tech ethics) which leads to an investigation that would tie up Pied Piper's business dealings. Richard is able to maneuver out of this with the help of Russ Hanneman. However, Pied Piper must now help Russ with his music festival RussFest. At RussFest, Richard suspects Laurie may be sabotaging their software as it is failing. It turns out neither Yao Net USA nor Pied Piper scale. Instead of quitting, Richard integrates Gilfoyle's AI (with some edits from Dinesh) into PiperNet and it works better than anyone could have expected, allowing Pied Piper to close a deal with AT&T. However, the team soon realizes that in this effort to maximize compression and efficiency, PiperNet's AI has found a way to bypass all encryption, causing a potential global threat if launched. Thus Pied Piper is forced to intentionally fail in order to save the world from their own creation. They are successful in crashing the launch, sabotaging it in such a way as to discourage future attempts. There is a 10-year flash forward to see where everyone is, ending with Richard misplacing a flash drive with the potential world security-threatening code on it.

== Cast and characters ==
- Thomas Middleditch as Richard Hendricks, a coder and founder/CEO of Pied Piper.
- T.J. Miller as Erlich Bachman (seasons 1–4), an entrepreneur who runs an innovation incubator in his house and owns 10% of Pied Piper.
- Josh Brener as Nelson "Big Head" Bighetti, Richard's best friend who works at Hooli. Despite possessing few skills as a programmer, he often finds himself being promoted and achieving success.
- Martin Starr as Bertram Gilfoyle, the Canadian network engineer of Pied Piper who is known for his stolid and sardonic personality. He is a LaVeyan Satanist.
- Kumail Nanjiani as Dinesh Chugtai, a programmer specializing in Java and member of Pied Piper. He is often the victim of Gilfoyle's ridicule, pranks, and racist slurs and also delivers them in kind as he becomes obsessed with one-upmanship.
- Christopher Evan Welch as Peter Gregory (season 1), the socially awkward billionaire founder and CEO of Raviga Capital as well as a 5% equity owner of Pied Piper after his $200,000 participating interests.
- Amanda Crew as Monica Hall, an employee of Raviga Capital and associate partner.
- Zach Woods as Donald "Jared" Dunn, an ex-VP of Hooli who quits the company in order to join the Pied Piper team as its COO and business advisor.
- Matt Ross as Gavin Belson (seasons 2–6; recurring season 1), the CEO and founder of Hooli and the series' main antagonist.
- Suzanne Cryer as Laurie Bream (seasons 2–6), the replacement for Peter Gregory as CEO of Raviga Capital, and later co-founder of Bream Hall Capital with Monica. Like her predecessor, she is highly intelligent and socially inept.
- Jimmy O. Yang as Jian-Yang (seasons 2–6; recurring season 1), another tenant of Erlich's incubator. While he has no involvement with Pied Piper, he and Erlich have frequent disagreements, and he interacts with the other characters in odd ways.
- Stephen Tobolowsky as "Action" Jack Barker (season 4; recurring season 3), briefly CEO of Pied Piper and later Hooli.
- Chris Diamantopoulos as Russ Hanneman (seasons 4 & 6; recurring season 2–3; guest season 5), a brash, loud and fiery billionaire investor who provides Pied Piper with their Series A.

== Production ==
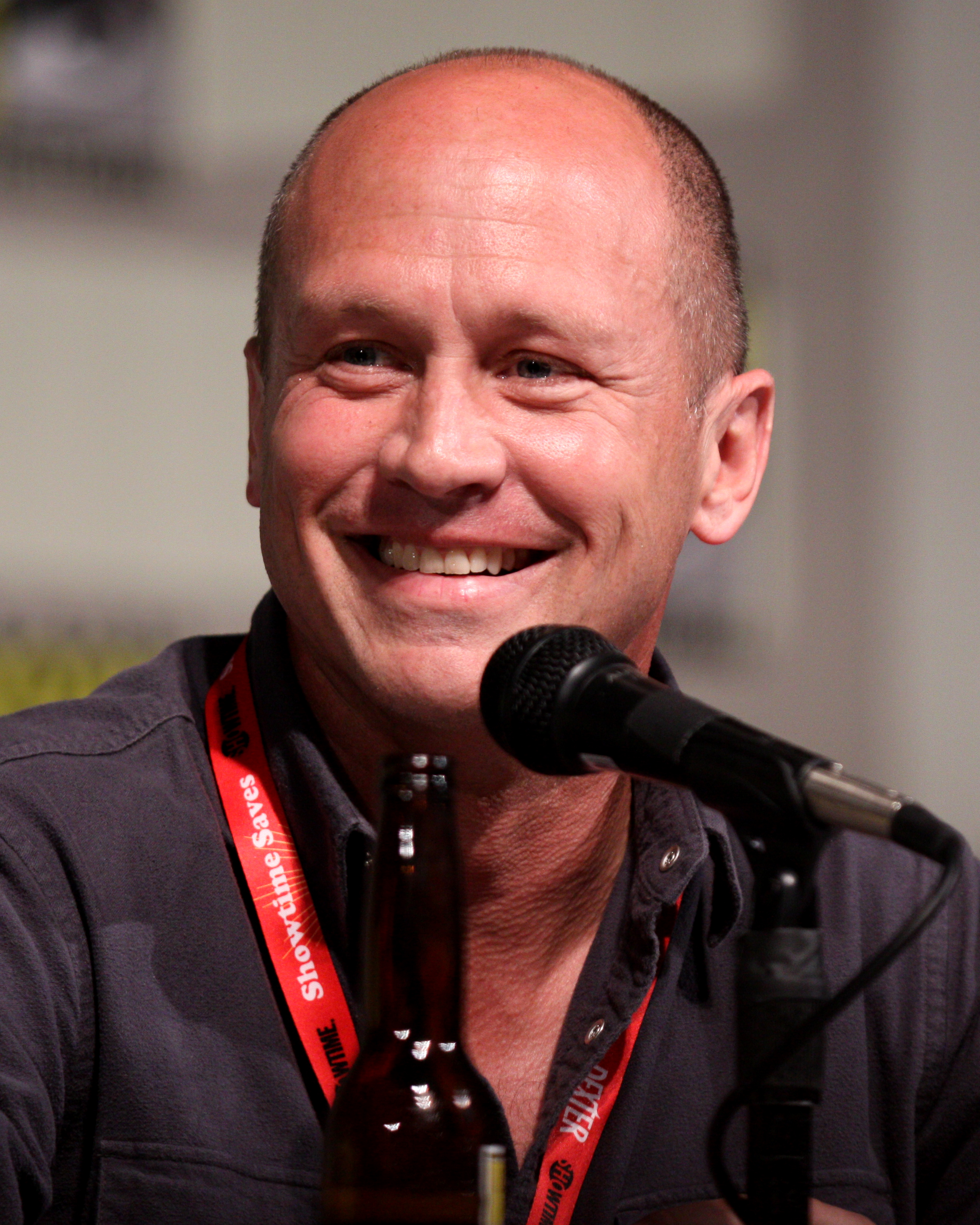
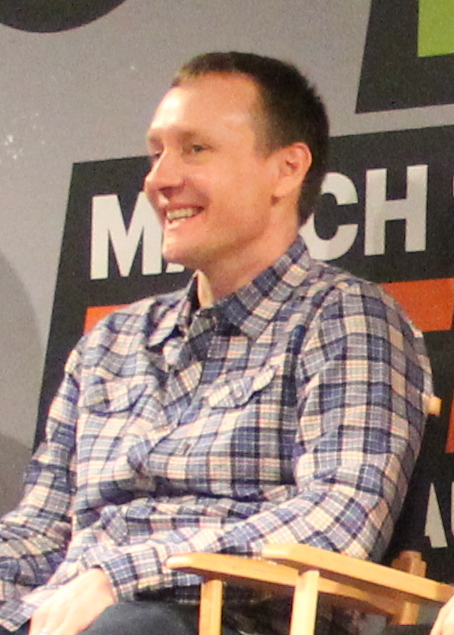
Series co-creator Mike Judge (left) and co-showrunner Alec Berg (right)

Co-creator and executive producer Mike Judge had worked in a Silicon Valley startup early in his career. In 1987, he was a programmer at Parallax Graphics, a company with about 40 employees. Judge disliked the company's culture and his colleagues ("The people I met were like Stepford Wives. They were true believers in something and I don't know what it was") and quit after less than three months, but the experience gave him the background to later create a show about the region's people and companies. He recollects also how startup companies pitched to him to make a Flash-based animation in the past as material for the first episode: "It was one person after another going, 'In two years, you will not own a TV set!' I had a meeting that was like a gathering of acolytes around a cult leader. 'Has he met Bill?' 'Oh, I'm the VP and I only get to see Bill once a month.' And then another guy chimed in, 'For 10 minutes, but the 10 minutes is amazing!'"

The idea of Pied Piper is inspired by real attempts for creating a decentralized web by a company called MaidSafe. Several of its team members served as advisors and consulted on the series.

Filming for the pilot of Silicon Valley began on March 12, 2013, in Palo Alto, California. HBO green-lit the series on May 16, 2013.

Christopher Evan Welch, who played billionaire Peter Gregory, died in December 2013 of lung cancer, having finished his scenes for the first five episodes. The production team decided against recasting the role and reshooting his scenes; on his death, Judge commented: "The brilliance of Chris' performance is irreplaceable, and inspired us in our writing of the series." He went on to say, "The entire ordeal was heartbreaking. But we are incredibly grateful to have worked with him in the brief time we had together. Our show and our lives are vastly richer for his having been in them." In the eighth episode of season 1, a memoriam is made in his honor at the end of the credits roll. The character of Peter Gregory was not killed off until the premiere of Season 2.

The show refers to a metric in comparing the compression rates of applications called the Weissman score, which did not exist before the show's run. It was created by Stanford Professor Tsachy Weissman and graduate student Vinith Misra at the request of the show's producers.

Clay Tarver was named co-showrunner in April 2017 alongside Mike Judge and Alec Berg, also serving as an executive producer.

=== Departure of T.J. Miller ===
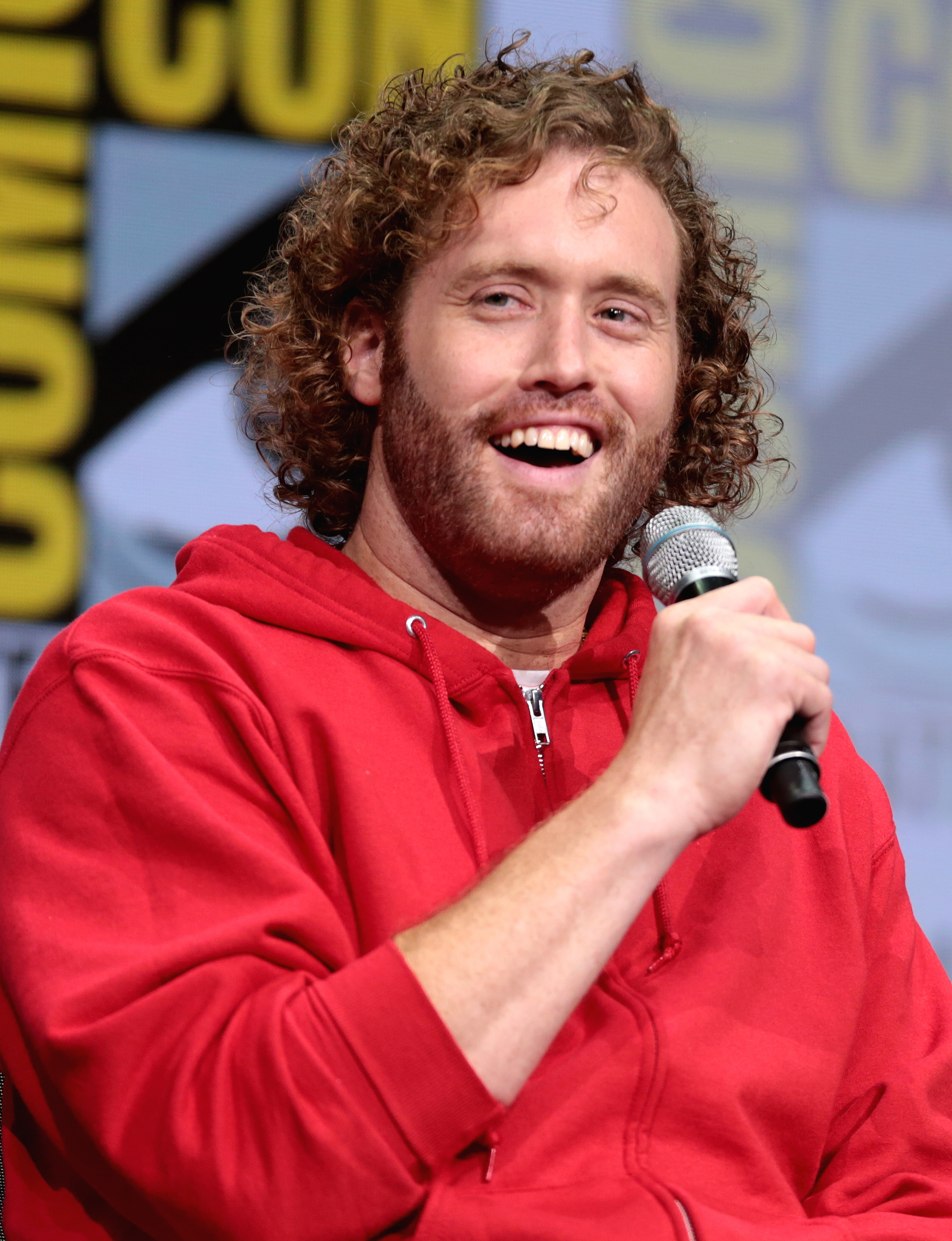
T.J. Miller departed the series after the fourth season.

In May 2017, it was announced that T.J. Miller would be exiting the series after the fourth season. Shortly after, in an interview with The Hollywood Reporter, co-showrunner Mike Judge stated that Miller was written out of the story because "It was kind of becoming clear that he didn't want to do the show anymore" and that the departure was initiated by Miller to "move on." In a separate interview with The Hollywood Reporter, Miller stated that while the departure was mutual, it was not initiated by him. Miller stated that he was offered a contract for a fifth season, albeit in a reduced role by only appearing in three of the ten episodes, stating that the executives told him this would let him "have more time to do all of the things you're doing." Miller retorted that he would rather be completely written off, and that "the best way for me to be involved in the show is by no longer being on it." The project that Miller was working on, that the executives wanted to make more time for him was The Emoji Movie, which Miller said made American culture "worse", and that, in retrospect, he thought the best decision for his career would be to return to stand-up and abandon acting altogether.

Miller also said that his character no longer had a role in the story the show was trying to tell, because of the approach the new showrunners were taking. He said that they had simply copied the story that Alec Berg had created in the first two seasons, following the basic premise that "If they fail, then they succeed, and then if they succeed, they fail. It's over and over. That's an old type of sitcom." However, when asked if Judge had reached out about writing him out or if he inquired about reducing his load prior to being offered his season five contract, Miller said he did not, and that the idea was first broached entirely at that meeting. As part of his departure, Miller was allowed to determine how he was written out, and came up with the idea of abandoning his character in Tibet, never to be seen or heard of again, himself.

Miller's departure from the show galvanized the internet discourse both for and against its showrunners, who in turn gave another interview with The Hollywood Reporter where they criticized Miller's handling of himself on set. Judge said that Miller was abusing alcohol and other substances, and that he would sometimes not show up to set. The show runners defended the repetitive plot, stating that it was the show's "magic". Judge also celebrated bringing on actual tech CEOs to help in the writer's room for season five and onward, including Twitter CEO Dick Costolo, but that they also felt there was no way forward for Miller's character. Judge said "I think there was only one time in the room where it was like, 'Oh, that would've been a good thing for [Miller].'"

Shortly after, Miller was accused of sexual assault, and in an interview with Vanity Fair where he denied these allegations, he also denied allegations from Judge that he would arrive on set intoxicated. He responded to Judge comparing Silicon Valley to a basketball team full of star players, and that Miller "wasn't LeBron" by simply laughing, and saying Judge was "good at being an asshole."

=== Title sequence ===
The series' title sequence is a pan over an animated city of isometric-style buildings with famous technology brands. Its composition changed each season, with visuals being added or replaced in reference to real-life developments in the technology industry. Wired called it "by far the most efficiently entertaining thing on television".

The first season's title sequence featured references to Apple, Netscape, SGI, Intel, eBay, PayPal, LinkedIn, Zynga, MySpace, Twitter, Napster, YouTube, Pets.com, Energy Pod, Google (including Chrome and Android), AOL, Facebook, Blogger, Adobe, Yahoo!, Oracle, and Hewlett-Packard.

In season 2, references were added for Anybots, AllThingsD.com, Uber, 23andMe, Clinkle, Appcelerator, Oculus VR, WhatsApp, Recode, and Alibaba.

In season 3, references were added for Amazon, Tesla, Alphabet, Lyft, and Soylent.

In season 4, references were added for Reddit, Snapchat, Pinterest, Airbnb, Yelp, KIND Financial, Dropbox, Twitch, Nest, Vine, Theranos, Slack, DiDi, Samsung, and Waymo.

In season 5, references were added for Whole Foods Market, Coinbase, and Juicero.

In season 6, references were added for Impossible Foods, Instagram, Eaze, Postmates, Instacart, and DoorDash.

The title music for each season is a sample of "Stretch Your Face" by Tobacco.

== Reception ==
=== Critical response ===
Critical response of Silicon Valley
Season	Rotten Tomatoes	Metacritic
1	95% (57 reviews)	84 (36 reviews)
2	96% (23 reviews)	86 (9 reviews)
3	100% (24 reviews)	90 (15 reviews)
4	94% (36 reviews)	85 (10 reviews)
5	89% (28 reviews)	73 (5 reviews)
6	94% (18 reviews)	78 (4 reviews)

Rotten Tomatoes presented the first season with a 95% rating and an average score of 7.9 out of 10 based on 57 reviews, with the critical consensus "Silicon Valley is a relevant, often hilarious take on contemporary technology and the geeks who create it that benefits from co-creator Mike Judge's real-life experience in the industry." Metacritic, a website that gathers critics' reviews, gives the first season an 84 out of 100 score based on 36 reviews.

Tim Goodman of The Hollywood Reporter said "HBO finds its best and funniest full-on comedy in years with this Mike Judge creation, and it may even tap into that most elusive thing, a wide audience." Matt Roush of TV Guide said "The deft, resonant satire that helped make Judge's Office Space a cult hit takes on farcical new dimension in Silicon Valley, which introduces a socially maladroit posse of computer misfits every bit the comic equal of The Big Bang Theory's science nerds." Emily VanDerWerff of The A.V. Club said "It feels weirdly like a tech-world Entourage—and that's meant as more of a compliment than it seems." Brian Tallerico of RogerEbert.com praised the jokes of the series but commented on the slow progression of the character development in the first two episodes and the reliance on common stereotypes in technology, including "the nerd who can't even look at a girl much less talk to her or touch her, the young businessman who literally shakes when faced with career potential". He went on to say that the lack of depth to the characters creates "this odd push and pull; I want the show to be more realistic but I don't care about these characters enough when it chooses to be so".

David Auerbach of Slate stated that the show did not go far enough to be called risky or a biting commentary of the tech industry. "Because I'm a software engineer, Silicon Valley might portray me with my pants up to my armpits, nerdily and nasally complaining that Thomas' compression algorithm is impossible or that nine times F in hexadecimal is 87, not 'fleventy five' (as Erlich says), but I would forgive such slips in a second if the show were funny." Auerbach claimed that he used to work for Google, and that his wife also worked for them at the time of the review.

On Metacritic, the second season has a score of 86 out of 100 based on nine reviews. On Rotten Tomatoes, the season holds a 96% approval rating with an average rating of 8.5 out of 10 based on 23 reviews. The site's consensus reads, "Silicon Valley re-ups its comedy quotient with an episode that smooths out the rough edges left behind by the loss of a beloved cast member."

On Rotten Tomatoes, the third season has a 100% approval rating with an average rating of 8.8 out of 10 based on 24 reviews. The site's consensus reads, "Silicon Valley's satirical take on the follies of the tech industry is sharper than ever in this very funny third season." On Metacritic, the season has a score of 90 out of 100 based on 15 reviews.

The series continued to receive critical acclaim in its fourth season. On Rotten Tomatoes, the season's approval rating is 94%, with an average rating of 7.6 out of 10 based on 36 reviews. The site's consensus reads, "Silicon Valley's fourth season advances the veteran comedy's overall arc while adding enough new wrinkles – and delivering more than enough laughs – to stay fresh." On Metacritic, the season has a score of 85 out of 100 based on 10 reviews.

The fifth season received generally positive reviews. On Rotten Tomatoes, the season's approval rating dipped to 89%, with an average rating of 7.3 out of 10 based on 28 reviews. The site's consensus reads, "Five seasons in, Silicon Valley finds a new way to up the ante with tighter, less predictable plots, while still maintaining its clever brand of comedic commentary." On Metacritic, the season has a score of 73 out of 100 based on five reviews.

The sixth and final season received very positive reviews. On Rotten Tomatoes, the season's approval is 94%, with an average rating of 7 out of 10 based on 18 reviews. The site's consensus reads, "Though the strangeness of reality threatens to one-up it, Silicon Valley's final season is funny, fearless, and still playing by its own rules to the very end." On Metacritic, the season has a score of 78 out of 100 based on four reviews.

=== Other reactions ===
Elon Musk, after viewing the first episode of the show, said: "I really feel like Mike Judge has never been to Burning Man, which is Silicon Valley [...] If you haven't been, you just don't get it. You could take the craziest L.A. party and multiply it by a thousand, and it doesn't even get close to what's in Silicon Valley. The show didn't have any of that." In response to Musk's comments, actor T.J. Miller, who plays Erlich on the show, pointed out that "if the billionaire power players don't get the joke, it's because they're not comfortable being satirized...I'm sorry, but you could tell everything was true. You guys do have bike meetings, motherfucker." Other software engineers who also attended the same premiere stated that they felt like they were watching their "reflection". Musk later changed his mind on the show. He said "It starts to get very accurate around episode 4...so it took a few episodes to kinda get grounded. The first episodes struck me as Hollywood making fun of Hollywood's idea of Silicon Valley...which is not on point. But by about the 4th or 5th episode of Season 1 it starts to get good, and by Season 2, it's amazing."

In January 2017, in an audience interaction by Bill Gates and Warren Buffett, Gates recounted the episode in Silicon Valley in which the protagonists try to pitch their product to various venture capitalists, saying it reminded him of his own experiences. Gates would later go on to have a cameo in the series finale.

In conference talks, Douglas Crockford has called Silicon Valley "the best show ever made about programming", citing the episode "Bachmanity Insanity" to illustrate the absurdity of the tabs versus spaces argument.

=== Accolades ===
Year	Ceremony	Category	Recipients	Result
2014	SXSW Audience Award	Episodic	Mike Judge	Won
2014	4th Critics' Choice Television Awards	Best Comedy Series	Silicon Valley	Nominated
2014	4th Critics' Choice Television Awards	Best Actor in a Comedy Series	Thomas Middleditch	Nominated
2014	4th Critics' Choice Television Awards	Best Supporting Actor in a Comedy Series	Christopher Evan Welch	Nominated
2014	66th Primetime Emmy Awards	Outstanding Comedy Series	Silicon Valley	Nominated
2014	66th Primetime Emmy Awards	Outstanding Directing for a Comedy Series	Mike Judge for "Minimum Viable Product"	Nominated
2014	66th Primetime Emmy Awards	Outstanding Writing for a Comedy Series	Alec Berg for "Optimal Tip-to-Tip Efficiency"	Nominated
2014	66th Primetime Emmy Awards	Outstanding Art Direction for a Contemporary Program (Half-Hour or Less)	Richard Toyon (production designer), L.J. Houdyshell (art director) and Cynthia Slagter (set decorator) for "Articles of Incorporation"	Nominated
2014	66th Primetime Emmy Awards	Outstanding Main Title Design	Garson Yu (creative director) and Mehmet Kizilay (designer/lead animator)	Nominated
2015	72nd Golden Globe Awards	Best Television Series – Musical or Comedy	Silicon Valley	Nominated
2015	67th Writers Guild of America Awards	Comedy Series	Silicon Valley	Nominated
2015	67th Writers Guild of America Awards	New Series	Silicon Valley	Nominated
2015	19th Satellite Awards	Best Musical or Comedy Series	Silicon Valley	Nominated
2015	19th Satellite Awards	Best Actor in a Musical or Comedy Series	Thomas Middleditch	Nominated
2015	67th Directors Guild of America Awards	Outstanding Directing – Comedy Series	Mike Judge for "Minimum Viable Product"	Nominated
2015	5th Critics' Choice Television Awards	Best Comedy Series	Silicon Valley	Won
2015	5th Critics' Choice Television Awards	Best Actor in a Comedy Series	Thomas Middleditch	Nominated
2015	5th Critics' Choice Television Awards	Best Supporting Actor in a Comedy Series	T.J. Miller	Won
2015	1st Golden Maple Awards	Best Actress in a TV Series Broadcast in the U.S.	Amanda Crew	Won
2015	67th Primetime Emmy Awards	Outstanding Comedy Series	Silicon Valley	Nominated
2015	67th Primetime Emmy Awards	Outstanding Directing for a Comedy Series	Mike Judge for "Sand Hill Shuffle"	Nominated
2015	67th Primetime Emmy Awards	Outstanding Writing for a Comedy Series	Alec Berg for "Two Days of the Condor"	Nominated
2015	67th Primetime Emmy Awards	Outstanding Single-Camera Picture Editing for a Comedy Series	Brian Merken for "Two Days of the Condor"	Won
2015	67th Primetime Emmy Awards	Outstanding Single-Camera Picture Editing for a Comedy Series	Tim Roche for "Sand Hill Shuffle"	Nominated
2015	67th Primetime Emmy Awards	Outstanding Art Direction for a Contemporary Program (Half hour or less)	Richard Toyon (production designer), L.J. Houdyshell (art director) and Jenny Mueller (set decorator) for "Sand Hill Shuffle"	Won
2015	67th Primetime Emmy Awards	Outstanding Sound Mixing for a Comedy or Drama Series (Half-Hour) and Animation	Ben Patrick (production mixer), Elmo Ponsdomenech (re-recording Mixer) and Todd Beckett (re-recording mixer) for "Server Space"	Nominated
2016	73rd Golden Globe Awards	Best Television Series – Musical or Comedy	Silicon Valley	Nominated
2016	68th Directors Guild of America Awards	Outstanding Directing – Comedy Series	Mike Judge for "Binding Arbitration"	Nominated
2016	20th Satellite Awards	Best Musical or Comedy Series	Silicon Valley	Won
2016	20th Satellite Awards	Best Actor in a Musical or Comedy Series	Thomas Middleditch	Nominated
2016	68th Writers Guild of America Awards	Comedy Series	Silicon Valley	Nominated
2016	68th Writers Guild of America Awards	Episodic Comedy	Clay Tarver for "Sand Hill Shuffle"	Won
2016	2nd Golden Maple Awards	Best Actress in a TV Series Broadcast in the U.S.	Amanda Crew	Nominated
2016	2nd Golden Maple Awards	Newcomer of the Year in a TV Series Broadcast in the U.S.	Amanda Crew	Won
2016	68th Primetime Emmy Awards	Outstanding Comedy Series	Silicon Valley	Nominated
2016	68th Primetime Emmy Awards	Outstanding Lead Actor in a Comedy Series	Thomas Middleditch for "The Empty Chair"	Nominated
2016	68th Primetime Emmy Awards	Outstanding Directing for a Comedy Series	Mike Judge for "Founder Friendly"	Nominated
2016	68th Primetime Emmy Awards	Outstanding Directing for a Comedy Series	Alec Berg for "Daily Active Users"	Nominated
2016	68th Primetime Emmy Awards	Outstanding Writing for a Comedy Series	Dan O'Keefe for "Founder Friendly"	Nominated
2016	68th Primetime Emmy Awards	Outstanding Writing for a Comedy Series	Alec Berg for "The Uptick"	Nominated
2016	68th Primetime Emmy Awards	Outstanding Production Design for a Narrative Program (Half Hour or Less)	Richard Toyon (production designer), Oana Bogdan (art director) and Jennifer Mueller (set decorator) for "Two in the Box", "Bachmanity Insanity" and "Daily Active Users"	Nominated
2016	68th Primetime Emmy Awards	Outstanding Single-Camera Picture Editing for a Comedy Series	Tim Roche for "Daily Active Users"	Nominated
2016	68th Primetime Emmy Awards	Outstanding Single-Camera Picture Editing for a Comedy Series	Brian Merken for "The Uptick"	Nominated
2016	68th Primetime Emmy Awards	Outstanding Sound Mixing for a Comedy or Drama Series (Half Hour) and Animation	Todd Becket (re-recording mixer), Elmo Ponsdomenech (re-recording mixer) and Ben Patrick (production mixer) for "Bachmanity Insanity"	Nominated
2016	68th Primetime Emmy Awards	Outstanding Casting for a Comedy Series	Jeanne McCarthy, Nicole Abellera Hallman and Leslie Woo	Nominated
2016	7th Critics' Choice Television Awards	Best Comedy Series	Silicon Valley	Won
2016	7th Critics' Choice Television Awards	Best Supporting Actor in a Comedy Series	T.J. Miller	Nominated
2016	Television Critics Association Awards	Outstanding Achievement in Comedy	Silicon Valley	Nominated
2017	21st Satellite Awards	Best Musical or Comedy Series	Silicon Valley	Won
2017	21st Satellite Awards	Best Actor in a Musical or Comedy Series	Thomas Middleditch	Nominated
2017	69th Primetime Emmy Awards	Outstanding Comedy Series	Silicon Valley	Nominated
2017	69th Primetime Emmy Awards	Outstanding Directing for a Comedy Series	Jamie Babbit for "Intellectual Property"	Nominated
2017	69th Primetime Emmy Awards	Outstanding Directing for a Comedy Series	Mike Judge for "Server Error"	Nominated
2017	69th Primetime Emmy Awards	Outstanding Writing for a Comedy Series	Alec Berg for "Success Failure"	Nominated
2017	69th Primetime Emmy Awards	Outstanding Casting for a Comedy Series	Jeanne McCarthy, Nicole Abellera Hallman, Leslie Woo	Nominated
2017	69th Primetime Emmy Awards	Outstanding Cinematography for a Single-Camera Series (Half-Hour)	Tim Suhrstedt for "Success Failure"	Nominated
2017	69th Primetime Emmy Awards	Outstanding Single-Camera Picture Editing for a Comedy Series	Brian Merken for "Server Error"	Nominated
2017	69th Primetime Emmy Awards	Outstanding Single-Camera Picture Editing for a Comedy Series	Tim Roche for "Success Failure"	Nominated
2017	69th Primetime Emmy Awards	Outstanding Production Design for a Narrative Program (Half Hour or Less)	Richard Toyon (production designer), Jaclyn Hauser (art director), Jennifer Mueller (set decorator) for "Success Failure", "Terms of Service", "Hooli-Con"	Nominated
2017	69th Primetime Emmy Awards	Outstanding Sound Mixing for a Comedy or Drama Series (Half Hour) or Animation	Elmo Ponsdomenech (re-recording mixer), Todd Beckett (re-recording mixer), Ben Patrick (production mixer) for "Intellectual Property"	Nominated
2018	70th Primetime Emmy Awards	Outstanding Comedy Series	Silicon Valley	Nominated
2018	70th Primetime Emmy Awards	Outstanding Directing for a Comedy Series	Mike Judge for "Initial Coin Offering"	Nominated
2018	70th Primetime Emmy Awards	Outstanding Writing for a Comedy Series	Alec Berg for "Fifty-One Percent"	Nominated
2019	23rd Satellite Awards	Best Actor in a Musical or Comedy Series	Thomas Middleditch	Nominated
2019	17th Visual Effects Society Awards	Outstanding Compositing in a Photoreal Episode	Tim Carras, Michael Eng, Shiying Li, Bill Parker for "Artificial Emotional Intelligence" – Fiona	Nominated
2020	24th Satellite Awards	Best Actor in a Musical or Comedy Series	Thomas Middleditch	Won
2020	72nd Primetime Emmy Awards	Outstanding Sound Editing for a Comedy or Drama Series (Half-Hour) and Animation	Bobby Mackston (sound supervisor), Sean Garnhart (sound effects editor), Ryan Gierke (dialogue editor), Joe Deveau (music editor) and Vincent Guisetti (Foley artist) for "Exit Event"	Nominated

== Home media ==
The complete first season was released on DVD and Blu-ray on March 31, 2015; bonus features include audio commentaries and behind-the-scenes featurettes. The second season was released on DVD and Blu-ray on April 19, 2016; bonus features include six audio commentaries, a behind-the-scenes featurette, and deleted scenes. The third season was released on DVD and Blu-ray on April 11, 2017; bonus features include deleted scenes. The fourth season was released on DVD and Blu-ray on September 12, 2017; bonus features include deleted scenes. The fifth season was released on DVD on September 4, 2018.

== International broadcast ==
In Australia, the series premiered on April 9, 2014, and aired on The Comedy Channel. In the United Kingdom, it premiered on July 16, 2014, airing on Sky Atlantic, while also being available on internet view-on-demand services such as Blinkbox. In New Zealand, the series airs on SoHo (owned by Sky Network Television Limited) and the series is available for streaming on Sky GO and NEON. In India, the series is available for streaming on JioCinema.
