= List of Silicon Valley episodes =

Silicon Valley is an American comedy television series created by Mike Judge, John Altschuler and Dave Krinsky. The series focuses on five young men who found a startup company in Silicon Valley. The series premiered on April 6, 2014, on HBO.

In April 2018, HBO renewed the series for a sixth season. In May 2019, HBO confirmed that season six would be the final season and consist of seven episodes. It premiered on October 27, 2019. During the course of the series, 53 episodes of Silicon Valley aired, between April 6, 2014, and December 8, 2019.

== Series overview ==
Season	Episodes	Originally released	
Season	Episodes	First released	Last released
1	8	April 6, 2014	June 1, 2014
2	10	April 12, 2015	June 14, 2015
3	10	April 24, 2016	June 26, 2016
4	10	April 23, 2017	June 25, 2017
5	8	March 25, 2018	May 13, 2018
6	7	October 27, 2019	December 8, 2019

== Episodes ==
=== Season 1 (2014) ===
No. overall	No. in season	Title	Directed by	Written by	Original release date	U.S. viewers (millions)
1	1	"Minimum Viable Product"	Mike Judge	Mike Judge & John Altschuler & Dave Krinsky	April 6, 2014	1.98
2	2	"The Cap Table"	Mike Judge	Carson Mell	April 13, 2014	1.69
3	3	"Articles of Incorporation"	Tricia Brock	Matteo Borghese & Rob Turbovsky	April 20, 2014	1.62
4	4	"Fiduciary Duties"	Maggie Carey	Ron Weiner	April 27, 2014	1.55
5	5	"Signaling Risk"	Alec Berg	Jessica Gao	May 4, 2014	1.82
6	6	"Third Party Insourcing"	Alec Berg	Dan O'Keefe	May 11, 2014	1.69
7	7	"Proof of Concept"	Mike Judge	Clay Tarver	May 18, 2014	1.68
8	8	"Optimal Tip-to-Tip Efficiency"	Mike Judge	Alec Berg	June 1, 2014	1.74

=== Season 2 (2015) ===
No. overall	No. in season	Title	Directed by	Written by	Original release date	U.S. viewers (millions)
9	1	"Sand Hill Shuffle"	Mike Judge	Clay Tarver	April 12, 2015	2.13
10	2	"Runaway Devaluation"	Mike Judge	Ron Weiner	April 19, 2015	1.73
11	3	"Bad Money"	Alec Berg	Alec Berg	April 26, 2015	1.94
12	4	"The Lady"	Alec Berg	Carson Mell	May 3, 2015	1.75
13	5	"Server Space"	Mike Judge	Sonny Lee	May 10, 2015	1.53
14	6	"Homicide"	Mike Judge	Carrie Kemper	May 17, 2015	1.54
15	7	"Adult Content"	Alec Berg	Amy Aniobi	May 24, 2015	1.60
16	8	"White Hat/Black Hat"	Alec Berg	Daniel Lyons	May 31, 2015	1.78
17	9	"Binding Arbitration"	Mike Judge	Dan O'Keefe	June 7, 2015	1.87
18	10	"Two Days of the Condor"	Alec Berg	Alec Berg	June 14, 2015	2.11

=== Season 3 (2016) ===
No. overall	No. in season	Title	Directed by	Written by	Original release date	U.S. viewers (millions)
19	1	"Founder Friendly"	Mike Judge	Dan O'Keefe	April 24, 2016	1.86
20	2	"Two in the Box"	Mike Judge	Ron Weiner	May 1, 2016	1.72
21	3	"Meinertzhagen's Haversack"	Charlie McDowell	Adam Countee	May 8, 2016	1.69
22	4	"Maleant Data Systems Solutions"	Charlie McDowell	Donick Cary	May 15, 2016	1.89
23	5	"The Empty Chair"	Eric Appel	Megan Amram	May 22, 2016	1.71
24	6	"Bachmanity Insanity"	Eric Appel	Carson Mell	May 29, 2016	1.62
25	7	"To Build a Better Beta"	Jamie Babbit	John Levenstein	June 5, 2016	1.70
26	8	"Bachman's Earnings Over-Ride"	Jamie Babbit	Carrie Kemper	June 12, 2016	1.64
27	9	"Daily Active Users"	Alec Berg	Clay Tarver	June 19, 2016	1.63
28	10	"The Uptick"	Alec Berg	Alec Berg	June 26, 2016	2.04

=== Season 4 (2017) ===
No. overall	No. in season	Title	Directed by	Written by	Original release date	U.S. viewers (millions)
29	1	"Success Failure"	Mike Judge	Alec Berg	April 23, 2017	0.867
30	2	"Terms of Service"	Mike Judge	Clay Tarver	April 30, 2017	0.762
31	3	"Intellectual Property"	Jamie Babbit	Carrie Kemper	May 7, 2017	0.774
32	4	"Teambuilding Exercise"	Jamie Babbit	Meghan Pleticha	May 14, 2017	0.859
33	5	"The Blood Boy"	Tim Roche	Adam Countee	May 21, 2017	0.844
34	6	"Customer Service"	Clay Tarver	Graham Wagner & Shawn Boxe	May 28, 2017	0.728
35	7	"The Patent Troll"	Jamie Babbit	Andrew Law	June 4, 2017	0.862
36	8	"The Keenan Vortex"	Jamie Babbit	Graham Wagner & Rachele Lynn	June 11, 2017	0.798
37	9	"Hooli-Con"	Mike Judge	Chris Provenzano	June 18, 2017	0.840
38	10	"Server Error"	Mike Judge	Dan O'Keefe	June 25, 2017	0.790

=== Season 5 (2018) ===
No. overall	No. in season	Title	Directed by	Written by	Original release date	U.S. viewers (millions)
39	1	"Grow Fast or Die Slow"	Mike Judge	Ron Weiner	March 25, 2018	0.698
40	2	"Reorientation"	Mike Judge	Carson Mell	April 1, 2018	0.592
41	3	"Chief Operating Officer"	Jamie Babbit	Carrie Kemper	April 8, 2018	0.624
42	4	"Tech Evangelist"	Jamie Babbit	Josh Lieb	April 15, 2018	0.610
43	5	"Facial Recognition"	Gillian Robespierre	Graham Wagner	April 22, 2018	0.858
44	6	"Artificial Emotional Intelligence"	Matt Ross	Anthony King	April 29, 2018	1.02
45	7	"Initial Coin Offering"	Mike Judge	Clay Tarver	May 6, 2018	0.853
46	8	"Fifty-One Percent"	Alec Berg	Alec Berg	May 13, 2018	0.707

=== Season 6 (2019) ===
No. overall	No. in season	Title	Directed by	Written by	Original release date	U.S. viewers (millions)
47	1	"Artificial Lack of Intelligence"	Mike Judge	Ron Weiner	October 27, 2019	0.448
48	2	"Blood Money"	Mike Judge	Carson Mell	November 3, 2019	0.383
49	3	"Hooli Smokes!"	Liza Johnson	Sarah Walker	November 10, 2019	0.459
50	4	"Maximizing Alphaness"	Liza Johnson	Daisy Gardner	November 17, 2019	0.452
51	5	"Tethics"	Pete Chatmon	Lew Morton	November 24, 2019	0.311
52	6	"RussFest"	Matt Ross	Carrie Kemper	December 1, 2019	0.414
53	7	"Exit Event"	Alec Berg	Alec Berg	December 8, 2019	0.454

== Ratings ==
Silicon Valley : U.S. viewers per episode (millions)

Season	Episode number										Average
Season	1	2	3	4	5	6	7	8	9	10	Average
1	1.98	1.69	1.62	1.55	1.82	1.69	1.68	1.74	–		1.72
2	2.13	1.73	1.94	1.75	1.53	1.54	1.60	1.78	1.87	2.11	1.80
3	1.86	1.72	1.69	1.89	1.71	1.62	1.70	1.64	1.63	2.04	1.75
4	0.867	0.762	0.774	0.859	0.844	0.728	0.862	0.798	0.840	0.790	0.812
5	0.698	0.592	0.624	0.610	0.858	1.02	0.853	0.707	–		0.745
6	0.448	0.383	0.459	0.452	0.311	0.414	0.454	–			0.417

Audience measurement performed by Nielsen Media Research
