= Weissman score =

Performance metric for lossless compression

The Weissman score is a performance metric for lossless compression applications. It was developed by Tsachy Weissman, a professor at Stanford University, and Vinith Misra, a graduate student, at the request of producers for HBO's television series Silicon Valley, a television show about a fictional tech start-up working on a data compression algorithm. It compares both required time and compression ratio of measured applications, with those of a de facto standard according to the data type.

The formula is the following; where r is the compression ratio, T is the time required to compress, the overlined ones are the same metrics for a standard compressor, and alpha is a scaling constant.
$$W = \alpha {r \over \overline{r}} {\log{\overline{T}} \over \log{T}}$$

The Weissman score has been used by Daniel Reiter Horn and Mehant Baid of Dropbox to explain real-world work on lossless compression. According to the authors it "favors compression speed over ratio in most cases."

== Example ==
This example shows the score for the data of the Hutter Prize, using the paq8f as a standard and 1 as the scaling constant.

Application	Compression ratio	Compression time [min]	Weissman score
paq8f	5.467600	300	1.000000
raq8g	5.514990	420	0.952480
paq8hkcc	5.682593	300	1.039321
paq8hp1	5.692566	300	1.041145
paq8hp2	5.750279	300	1.051701
paq8hp3	5.800033	300	1.060801
paq8hp4	5.868829	300	1.073826
paq8hp5	5.917719	300	1.082325
paq8hp6	5.976643	300	1.093102
paq8hp12	6.104276	540	1.012142
decomp8	6.261574	540	1.038223
decomp8	6.276295	540	1.040664

== Limitations ==
Although the value is relative to the standards against which it is compared, the unit used to measure the times changes the score (see examples 1 and 2). This is a consequence of the requirement that the argument of the logarithmic function must be dimensionless. The multiplier also can't have a numeric value of 1 or less, because the logarithm of 1 is 0 (examples 3 and 4), and the logarithm of any value less than 1 is negative (examples 5 and 6); that would result in scores of value 0 (even with changes), undefined, or negative (even if better than positive).

#	Standard compressor			Scored compressor			Weissman score	Observations
#	Compression ratio	Compression time	Log (compression time)	Compression ratio	Compression time	Log (compression time)	Weissman score	Observations
1	2.1	2 min	0.30103	3.4	3 min	0.477121	1×3.4/2.1×0.30103/0.477121=1.021506	Change in unit or scale, changes the result.
2	2.1	120 sec	2.079181	3.4	180 sec	2.255273	1×3.4/2.1×2.079181/2.255273=1.492632	Change in unit or scale, changes the result.
3	2.2	1 min	0	3.3	1.5 min	0.176091	1×3.3/2.2×0/0.176091=0	If time is 1, its log is 0; then the score can be 0 or ±∞.
4	2.2	0.667 min	−0.176091	3.3	1 min	0	1×3.3/2.2×(−0.176091)/0=−∞	If time is 1, its log is 0; then the score can be 0 or ±∞.
5	1.6	0.5 h	−0.30103	2.9	1.1 h	0.041393	1×2.9/1.6×(−0.30103)/0.041393=−13.18138	If time is less than 1, its log is negative; then the score can be negative.
6	1.6	1.1 h	0.041393	1.6	0.9 h	−0.045757	1×1.6/1.6×0.041393/(−0.045757)=−0.904627	If time is less than 1, its log is negative; then the score can be negative.

== See also ==
- Benchmark
- Coding theory
- Information theory
- Phred quality score
