= David Dinenberg =

American business executive

David Dinenberg is an American business executive best known as the founder and former CEO of KIND Financial.

== Career ==
=== Real Chef ===
Dinenberg was the co-founder and executive vice president of Real Chef, which developed its own proprietary brand of cooking tools and foods, as well as the nationally known Flavor Magic.

=== Tycoon Entertainment ===
After leaving Real Chef, Dinenberg was the chief operating officer and a partner at Tycoon Entertainment, a full-service film finance and production company. His responsibilities included the day-to-day operations of the company, deal structure, sourcing debt for the projects as well as budget oversight. He worked with agents, lawyers, producers and distributors, both foreign and domestic.

=== Grasso Holdings ===
Dinenberg was Chief Operations Officer of Grasso Holdings in Philadelphia, a full-service real estate development company, where he ran day-to-day operations for the 45 person organization managing an asset portfolio valued in excess of $400 million. Dinenberg was recognized as one of the Top 20 people to Watch in the Philadelphia Area by Philadelphia Magazine.

=== KIND Financial ===
Dinenberg founded and was the CEO of KIND Financial, a financial technology company providing software solutions to businesses within the cannabis industry transact securely and in compliance with laws and regulations. He has been interviewed or quoted by several media outlets including CNBC, Inc., Forbes, Philadelphia magazine, The Deal, and LA Business Journal. Dinenberg was forced to step down and turnover his company-issued shares of KIND Financial in September of 2023 as investors lost financial visibility of the company and accused him of breach of fiduciary duty and misuse of company funds.

==== Fraud investigation and charges ====
On September 29 2026, the US Attorney's Office for the Eastern District of Pennsylvania announced that Dinenberg was being charged with security fraud and four counts of wire fraud related to his activities with KIND in Pennsylvania and Rhode Island. The charges accuse Dinenberg of using investor funds to pay for personal expenses including rent, his children's tuition and social club memberships. The charge

== Board positions ==
Dinenburg co-founded the Philadelphia Retail Advisory Board. In 2012, he was named the president and member of the board of directors for the Philadelphia Chapter of the Jewish National Fund, the youngest ever president of any Jewish foundation in the United States.

== Personal life and education ==
David Dinenberg was born in Philadelphia and graduated from Pennsylvania State University.
