= Tsachy Weissman =

Israeli-American academic

Itschak (Tsachy) Weissman
- Education: Technion – Israel Institute of Technology
- Known for: Information Theory and Communications, Statistical Signal Processing, Weissman score
- Scientific career
- Fields: Information Theory, Digital Communications, Statistical Signal Processing, Applications
- Workplaces: Stanford University

Tsachy (Itschak) Weissman is a professor of electrical engineering at Stanford University. He is the founding director of the Stanford Compression Forum. His research interests include information theory, statistical signal processing, their applications, with recent emphasis on biological applications, in genomics in particular, lossless compression, lossy compression, delay-constrained and complexity-constrained compression and communication, network information theory, feedback communications, directed information, the interplay between estimation theory and information theory, entropy, noise reduction (denoising), filtering, prediction, sequential decision making, learning, and connections with probability, statistics, and computer science.

He was the senior technical advisor to HBO's Silicon Valley, and namesake of the Weissman score therein.

On his personal website, Weissman has spoken out against intimidation and sexual harassment in the information theory community.

== Education ==
Weissman received his Bachelor of Science in electrical engineering (summa cum laude) in 1997, and his Ph.D. (2001) from Technion – Israel Institute of Technology.

== Career ==
In 2002, Weissman joined Hewlett-Packard (HP) laboratories as a researcher; in 2003, he became a visiting scientist at HP. At HP, he was co-inventor of a denoising algorithm named the Discrete Universal Denoiser (DUDE).

Weissman became assistant professor of electrical engineering at Stanford University in 2003. He was promoted to associate professor in 2010, and professor in 2015. He was named Fellow of the Institute of Electrical and Electronics Engineers IEEE in 2013 for contributions to information theory and its applications in signal processing.

== Publications ==
- B. Marcus, K. Petersen and T. Weissman (eds.), Entropy of Hidden Markov Processes and Connections to Dynamical Systems, Cambridge University Press, July 2011.
