= KIND Financial =

American financial technology company

- Type: Private
- Industry: Financial technology
- Founded: 2013
- Headquarters: Los Angeles
- Key people: David Dinenberg, Founder
- Website: KIND Financial

KIND Financial is an American start-up focused on providing financial technology services for the cannabis industry. KIND would fail to launch, with CEO and founder David Dinenberg departing the company on May 4, 2023.

== History ==
In 2013, David Dinenberg founded Kind Banking to be the "Wells Fargo of the marijuana banking industry" before changing the name of the company to Kind Financial in late 2014. Dinenberg also is CEO of KIND, which has its headquarters in Los Angeles, California.

KIND's technology platform seeks to provide tools focused on cannabis tracking and compliance for cultivators, dispensaries, and regulatory agencies in the cannabis industry. These tools are said to manage the entire cannabis business life-cycle and keep transactions safe, secure and compliant with rules, regulations, laws and guidelines with the federal guidelines set forth by FinCEN.

KIND's seed-to-sale tracking and compliance platform, Agrisoft Seed to Sale, integrates with KIND's cash-management and order-taking kiosk as well as KIND Pay. Together, the KIND platform should provide a way to close the loop between marijuana-related businesses and financial institutions.

KIND quickly grew a prestigious investor portfolio, mostly from Dinenberg's native Philadelphia, consisting of venture capitalist Wayne Kimmel, singer-songwriter John Legend, film producer Mike Jackson, Eagles running back Brian Westbrook, the heiress of Ed Snider's, the original owner of the Philadelphia Flyers, fortune Lindy Snider, tennis player Andy Roddick, 76ers manager Billy King, Philadelphia Inquirer executive Greg Liss, and model and actress Brooklyn Decker.

=== Microsoft partnership ===
On June 17, 2016, Microsoft announced its partnership with KIND. Namely that KIND was going to seek government clients in states where marijuana sales were legal.

Despite cash support from a Texan bank, Oklahoman investment fund, and several cannabis companies, KIND stalled namely due to the extra costs required to overcome federal bureaucracy. KIND stopped updating its investors on its financial statements and tax records, and on May 4, 2023, founder and CEO David Dinenberg left the company.

Dinenberg blamed the failure of KIND to launch due to the lack of word of mouth advertising from its investors, his own legal troubles and $700,000 in court ordered restitution, and the 2008 Great Recession. KIND's investors retorted that Dinenberg failed to disclose his legal troubles and was mismanaging company funds.

=== Relaunch attempt ===
Despite the departure of Dinenberg the company's investors attempted to re-launch as an app where users can purchase cannabis products. This effort to relaunch is being headed by Snider and Liss, who announced that they were actively looking for a new CEO as of September 28, 2023. Since Dinenberg's departure, KIND's website has been "down for maintenance" with the text "Don't be sad that it's gone, be happy that it happened" displayed across their homepage.
