= Clay Tarver =

American guitarist and writer (born 1965)

Clay Tarver (born November 8, 1965, in San Antonio, Texas) is an American guitarist and writer. He was the co-showrunner and an executive producer of Silicon Valley.

== Biography ==
=== Music career ===
Tarver—who graduated from Harvard University in 1988—first came to prominence as the co-founder and lead guitarist of the Boston hard rock/punk band Bullet LaVolta in the late 1980s. They recorded a few records for Taang!, RCA, and Matador Records before disbanding in 1991. He then formed Chavez with Matt Sweeney, Scott Marshall and James Lo.

=== Movie career ===
Tarver has also worked as a screenwriter for television and film. He created the "Jimmy the Cabdriver"(Donal Logue) interstitials for MTV in the mid 1990s with friends from college. He has also written the screenplay for films such as Joy Ride, with J. J. Abrams, and other projects with Mike Judge.

Tarver won the 2016 Writers Guild of America Award for Episodic Comedy with "Sand Hill Shuffle," an episode of HBO's Silicon Valley.
