= Dude (Lethal Bizzle and Stormzy song) =

Single by Lethal Bizzle & Stormzy
- Released: 30 October 2015
- Length: 3:43
- Label: Stay Dench Records

Lethal Bizzle singles chronology
"Playground" (2015)	"Dude" (2015)	"Going to the Gym" (2015)

Stormzy singles chronology
"WickedSkengMan 4" (2015)	"Dude" (2015)	"Hear Dis" (2015)

Music video
- "Dude" on YouTube

"Dude" is a song by British rapper, actor Lethal Bizzle and English rapper Stormzy. It was released as a single on 30 October 2015 by Stay Dench Records. The song peaked at number 49 on the UK Singles Chart.

== Music video ==
A music video to accompany the release of "Dude" was first released onto YouTube on 19 October 2015. The music video was directed by Matthew Walker.

== Charts ==
Chart (2015)	Peak position
UK Singles Downloads (OCC)	24
UK Indie (OCC)	7
UK Hip Hop/R&B (OCC)	7
UK Singles (OCC)	49

== Release history ==
Region	Date	Format	Label
United Kingdom	30 October 2015	Digital download	Stay Dench Records
