= The Disruption (Succession) =

- Succession episode
- Episode no.: Season 3 Episode 3
- Directed by: Cathy Yan
- Written by: Ted Cohen; Georgia Pritchett
- Cinematography by: Christopher Norr
- Original air date: October 31, 2021
- Running time: 59 minutes

Guest appearances
- Hiam Abbass as Marcia Roy; Linda Emond as Michelle-Anne Vanderhoven; Sanaa Lathan (voice) as Lisa Arthur; Scott Nicholson as Colin; Juliana Canfield as Jess Jordan; Annabelle Dexter-Jones as Naomi Pierce; Zoë Winters as Kerry; Ashley Zukerman as Nate Sofrelli; Zack Robidas as Mark Ravenhead; Jihae as Berry Schneider; Dasha Nekrasova as Comfry; KeiLyn Durrel Jones as Remi; Patch Darragh as Ray; Ziwe as Sophie Iwobi; Will Tracy as Dylan

Episode chronology
← Previous "Mass in Time of War"	Next → "Lion in the Meadow"
- Succession season 3

"The Disruption" is the third episode of the third season of the American satirical comedy-drama television series Succession, and the 23rd episode overall. It was written by Ted Cohen and Georgia Pritchett and directed by Cathy Yan, and originally aired on HBO on October 31, 2021.

The episode follows Kendall and Logan working to improve their respective public profiles as a Department of Justice investigation looms over Waystar.

== Plot ==
Kendall becomes increasingly self-conscious about his public image, giving various interviews to the press and vigilantly monitoring his social media presence. Logan and Waystar plan their own PR strategy, with Hugo and Karolina fielding employee complaints for an upcoming town hall event and Roman giving an interview praising Logan's parenting. Logan refuses to cooperate with the Department of Justice's ongoing investigation into the company, despite Gerri asserting that they should cooperate to prevent damage to Waystar's image.

Kendall gives a speech at a charity dinner, which Shiv (now Waystar's President of Domestic Operations) attends on Logan's behalf. Kendall apologizes to Shiv for his outburst at Rava's apartment, but refuses to back down from his media campaign. At an after-party, Kendall and his associates watch a newly aired segment from The Disruption, a late-night talk show whose host Sophie Iwobi frequently disparages him. Kendall decides to make an appearance on the show.

Shiv meets Logan at his apartment after the gala. Logan unconvincingly claims that nothing in the stolen cruises documents incriminates him for serious wrongdoing and that he was only protecting his children, but Shiv warns that law enforcement has the power to implicate him in the cover-up. She returns home to find a drunken Tom, who informs her that his lawyers believe he will likely spend time in prison. Tom suggests that he volunteer himself to Logan as a candidate for incarceration, which Shiv agrees could have a tactical advantage. Tom broaches the idea to Logan the next day during the taping of an ATN interview with White House aide Michelle-Anne Vanderhoven. Logan assures Tom that he will not face such dire consequences, but is appreciative of the gesture. Tom privately contacts a lawyer.

Logan catches Michelle-Anne after the interview and asks for assurances that his refusal to cooperate with the DOJ investigation will not have political blowback, but Michelle-Anne warns that Logan's close relationship with the President could prove problematic. She agrees to negotiate with the President if Logan moderates ATN's White House coverage. Meanwhile, Kendall defies Lisa's advice and decides to barge into Waystar's offices despite his security privileges being revoked; Logan asks that Kendall be fired and orders his security to keep Kendall away from him, but Gerri warns that firing Kendall would reflect negatively on the company. Tom greets Kendall on the executive floor, and Kendall extends him an offer to join his side.

Logan, Shiv, Roman, and the others decide to ignore Kendall and proceed to Waystar's town hall event, which Shiv is hosting. However, Kendall sabotages the event by having his assistants purchase speakers and blast Nirvana's "Rape Me" at full volume in the middle of Shiv's speech. An irate Shiv drafts an open letter attacking Kendall and asks Roman and Connor to sign it, but they both object out of discomfort with the personal details Shiv chose to include in the statement, such as Kendall's substance abuse and failed relationships. Shiv decides to publish the letter herself.

Kendall prepares to make an appearance on The Disruption, but learns backstage that Shiv's letter has gone online. He unsuccessfully negotiates with the show's producer to omit mention of the letter from his interview, and decides to back out of his appearance 15 minutes before broadcast. Deeply shaken by the letter's contents, Kendall hides out in a server room while Iwobi's segment airs. Meanwhile, Gerri informs Logan that the FBI has arrived to raid Waystar's offices, with his attempts to extract favors from the President through Michelle-Anne likely having tipped off the DOJ; Logan is forced to cooperate. Shiv and Kendall separately watch live broadcasts breaking the news of the FBI's raid.

== Production ==
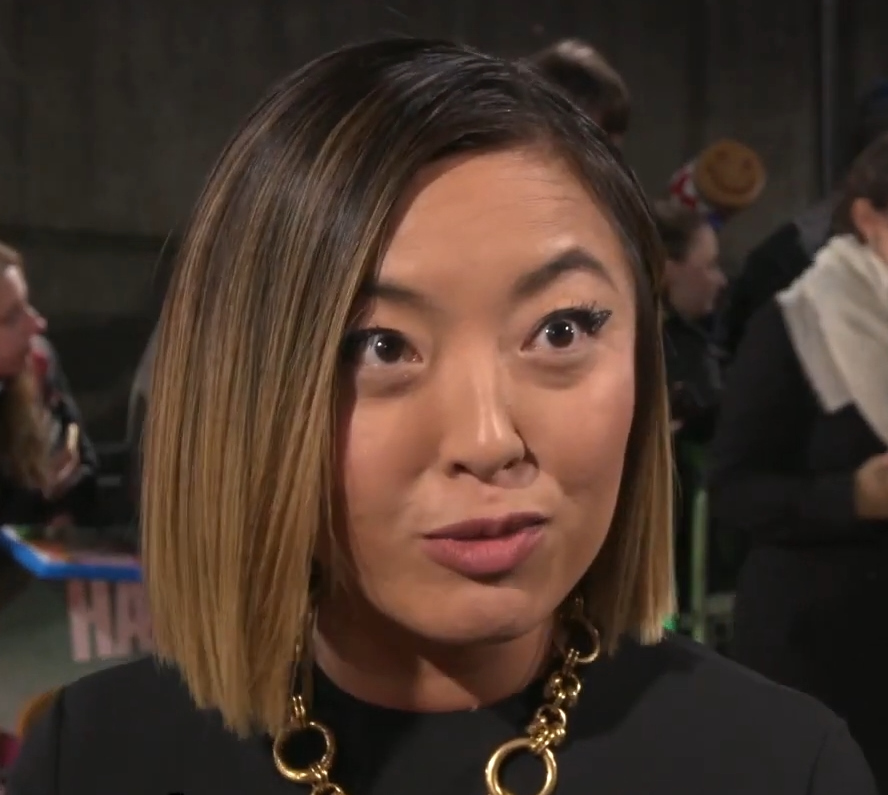
Cathy Yan directed "The Disruption".

"The Disruption" was written by Ted Cohen and Georgia Pritchett (marking the first Succession episode to share writing credit) and directed by filmmaker Cathy Yan, known for directing the films Dead Pigs and Birds of Prey. Comedian Ziwe Fumudoh makes a guest appearance as Sophie Iwobi, host of the titular late-night talk show on which Kendall nearly makes an appearance. The character was initially written as a parody of Samantha Bee, but was reworked by showrunner Jesse Armstrong to fit Fumudoh's personality after she successfully auditioned for the role. The fictional series The Disruption bears similarities to both Bee's Full Frontal and Fumudoh's own late-night talk show Ziwe.

The episode became notable for the use of Nirvana's "Rape Me", which Kendall has his assistants play on a loudspeaker to sabotage Shiv's company town hall event. Courtney Love, widow of Nirvana frontman Kurt Cobain, personally approved the song's usage in the series, feeling that the writers "truly understood" Cobain's intentions with the song.

=== Filming ===
Kendall's gala event for the fictional Committee for the Protection and Welfare of Journalists (CPWJ) was filmed at the New York Public Library. According to co-star Jihae, who plays Berry Schneider, the scenes were filmed during reshoots at the tail end of production on the third season.

== Reception ==
=== Ratings ===
Upon airing, the episode was watched by 0.405 million viewers, with an 18-49 rating of 0.08.

=== Critical reception ===
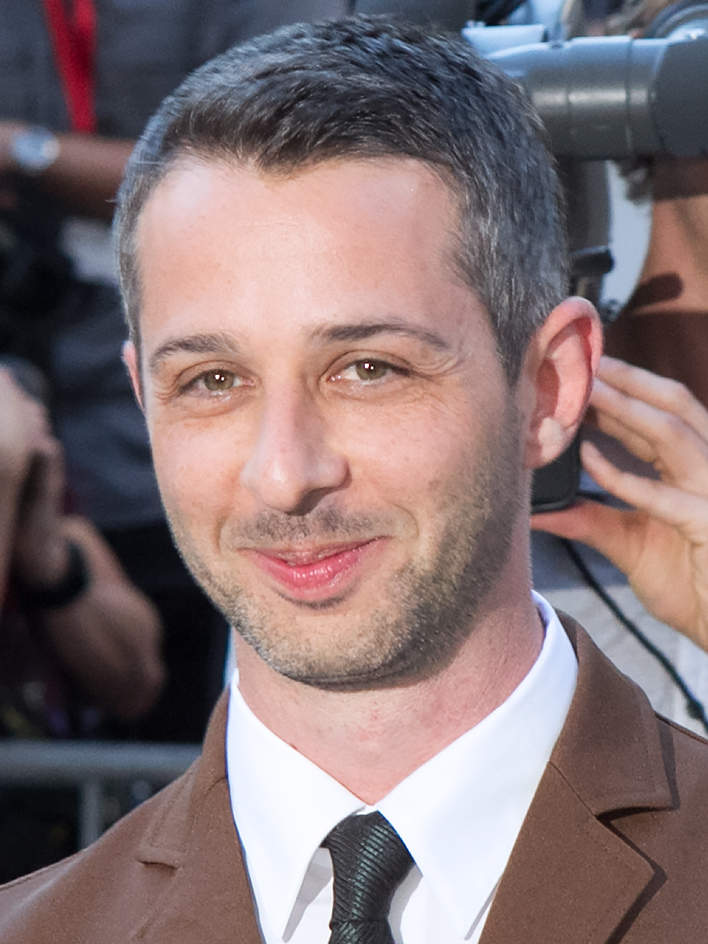
Jeremy Strong's performance in the episode was widely praised by critics.

"The Disruption" received critical acclaim, with reviewers praising the performances, Yan's direction, and the episode's heightened stakes. Roxana Hadadi of The A.V. Club gave the episode a B+, writing that the episode "both visually and narratively builds on the intimacy and familiarity between the siblings in "Mass in Time of War," and then explodes it all outward." Hadadi highlighted how the episode drew Kendall and Shiv's personal conflicts to the forefront, and praised Yan's direction for "tempering" the series's typical visual style, writing: "Less-aggressive zooms, fewer round-robin-style edits to capture everyone’s reactions, and a longer hold on certain compositions that purposefully mirrored their subjects helped slow down the episode in scenes that needed a certain sense of melancholy." Scott Tobias of Vulture gave the episode 4 out of 5 stars, praising Jeremy Strong's depiction of Kendall as "a complex fusion of strategy, egotism, and childlike neediness and vulnerability that’s simultaneously pathetic and heartbreaking."

Ben Travers of IndieWire gave the episode an A−, praising the script for balancing the "twisted backstabbing" with "an onslaught of incredible jokes," calling the episode "far funnier than it has any right to be." Travers also reserved praise for Yan's direction and the episode's cinematography, highlighting the "striking" usage of the Manhattan skyline. Caroline Framke of Variety felt "The Disruption" was the season's "tensest" episode, calling the town hall scene "one of the series’s most jaw-dropping moments to date" and praising Matthew Macfadyen for giving the series's "strangest and possibly outright best performance." Framke also praised the way the episode charted Shiv's pivot against Kendall, praising Sarah Snook and the writers for "[crafting] a character that’s sharp but impulsive, proud to a fault and reactionary in the moment." Alan Sepinwall of Rolling Stone praised both Strong and Macfadyen's performances, as well as singling out the episode's examination of Kendall's festering conflict with his siblings, writing: "Last week’s episode was all about Kendall trying to bring his siblings together, only to be rejected. So 'The Disruption' is appropriately about him lashing out at them, and the other members of the family debating how, or whether, to fight back."

Conversely, at the conclusion of the series Stuart Heritage of The Guardian ranked "The Disruption" as the worst episode of Succession. Heritage described the episode as "a largely pointless episode of ping pong between Kendall and the rest of the Roys", "uncharacteristically heavy-handed", and "a bewildering outlier for such a good series".

=== Accolades ===
TVLine named Jeremy Strong "Performer of the Week" for the week of November 6, 2021. The site wrote, "All season long on HBO's riveting prestige drama, Kendall Roy has been on a crusade to take down his father Logan, confidently charging forward at a breathless pace and rattling off dense torrents of corporate buzzwords. But behind all that bravado, there's a scared, vulnerable soul, and Strong gave us a devastating glimpse at that soul this week when Kendall was floored by a betrayal from his own sister Shiv [...] His reaction to that gut punch was Strong's best work so far this season: Kendall tried to bow out of his late-night appearance, but a producer convinced him to stay, and as he walked away from her, Strong's easygoing smile slowly faded, step by step, into a concerned frown as Kendall made his way down a long hallway [...] Strong is great at playing Kendall's brash, entitled side, but this week — and that walk down the hallway — reminded us he's also great at playing the fragile, wounded side of Kendall that he works so hard to hide."

At the 74th Primetime Emmy Awards, Cathy Yan was nominated for the Primetime Emmy Award for Outstanding Directing for a Drama Series for this episode. In addition, J. Smith-Cameron was nominated the Primetime Emmy Awards for Outstanding Supporting Actress in a Drama Series.
