= Lion in the Meadow (Succession) =

- Succession episode
- Episode no.: Season 3 Episode 4
- Directed by: Robert Pulcini & Shari Springer Berman
- Written by: Jon Brown
- Cinematography by: Patrick Capone
- Original air date: November 7, 2021
- Running time: 59 minutes

Guest appearances
- Arian Moayed as Stewy Hosseini; Adrien Brody as Josh Aaronson; Scott Nicholson as Colin; Zoë Winters as Kerry; Juliana Canfield as Jess Jordan; Jihae as Berry Schneider; Dasha Nekrasova as Comfry; Zack Robidas as Mark Ravenhead; Quentin Morales as Iverson Roy; Swayam Bhatia as Sophie Roy; KeiLyn Durrel Jones as Remi

Episode chronology
← Previous "The Disruption"	Next → "Retired Janitors of Idaho"
- Succession season 3

"Lion in the Meadow" is the fourth episode of the third season of the American satirical comedy-drama television series Succession, and the 24th episode overall. It was written by Jon Brown and directed by Robert Pulcini and Shari Springer Berman, and originally aired on HBO on November 7, 2021.

The episode primarily follows Kendall and Logan reuniting to meet jointly with Josh Aaronson, a major Waystar shareholder concerned about their family feud.

At the 74th Primetime Emmy Awards, Adrien Brody, who played Aaronson, was nominated for Outstanding Guest Actor in a Drama Series for his performance in the episode.

== Plot ==
Four days before the annual shareholder meeting, Kendall is informed by Waystar senior management that investor Josh Aaronson, who owns 4% of the company's shares, is losing trust in its leadership amid the family feud and DOJ investigation, and may join Sandy and Stewy. Josh requests that Kendall and Logan meet with him jointly; Kendall initially refuses, but is convinced to go by Frank, unaware that Logan is listening in.

Logan has Shiv direct ATN to be more critical in their coverage of the presidential administration, hoping it will pressure the White House into finally granting him legal and political favors. Shiv passes the order onto Tom, who has become mournfully fixated on the possibility of spending time in prison and feels emasculated taking orders from his wife. Shiv then meets with Connor, who has decided to push his presidential campaign four years down the road, and is seeking a role at the company in the interim to improve his perceived credibility.

Logan, meanwhile, presents Greg with a joint defense agreement with Waystar, offering that he use his existing leverage to negotiate a better position at the company. Tom visits Greg at his office to pressure him into siding with the company, but learns that Greg has already agreed to sign the agreement with Logan and is now seeking an executive position at the parks department.

In an attempt to discredit Kendall, Roman tracks down a formerly homeless man that he and Kendall convinced to tattoo Kendall's initials on his forehead years prior, but learns that the man has since had the tattoo removed. Roman and Hugo reach a $1 million settlement with the man to obtain photos of the tattoo, but Gerri talks Roman out of publicizing the pictures, given that he too was involved in the incident.

Kendall and Logan separately fly out to Josh's private island residence. Both remain pensive and standoffish; Josh decides that the three take a walk through the surrounding property. Josh informs them that their blood feud has already lost him $350 million, roughly 10 percent of his holdings. He attempts to talk Kendall down from his whistleblower campaign, arguing that father-son unity would restore company stability and unburden the shareholders, but Kendall becomes paranoid that Josh and Logan are attempting to sabotage him.

Upon reaching the coastline, Logan gives a call to Shiv warning her not to overstep after hearing from Karl that she has become too assertive in her position at the company. Shiv, afraid of being undermined, decides to personally confront ATN anchor Mark Ravenhead after he refuses Tom's request to shift his editorial position on the President, and strongarms him into complying with Logan's orders.

Kendall and Logan sit down for lunch with Josh, who demands to know whether the family rift can be mended in time; Logan reassures him that it can, giving a speech praising Kendall and even suggesting that he is a worthy successor. However, on the walk back to the house, Logan and Kendall exchange threats, with the former revealing Greg's shift in allegiance and making it clear that Kendall will never lead Waystar. Logan begins to suffer the effects of heat exhaustion, but attempts to trudge on, refusing to be seen in a weakened state before Josh. Kendall neglects to help until Logan collapses, forcing Kendall and Josh to help him up. Kendall attempts to continue negotiating with Josh, but Josh asks him to focus on his father's wellbeing.

In his private jet, Logan receives a furious call from the President over ATN's critical coverage, which Logan promises to temper if the DOJ's Waystar investigation is relaxed. Kendall receives a call from Roman informing him that Josh has lost confidence in Waystar's leadership after witnessing Kendall and Logan's fractured relationship for himself. Moments later, Kendall sees Stewy arriving by helicopter to greet Josh.

== Production ==
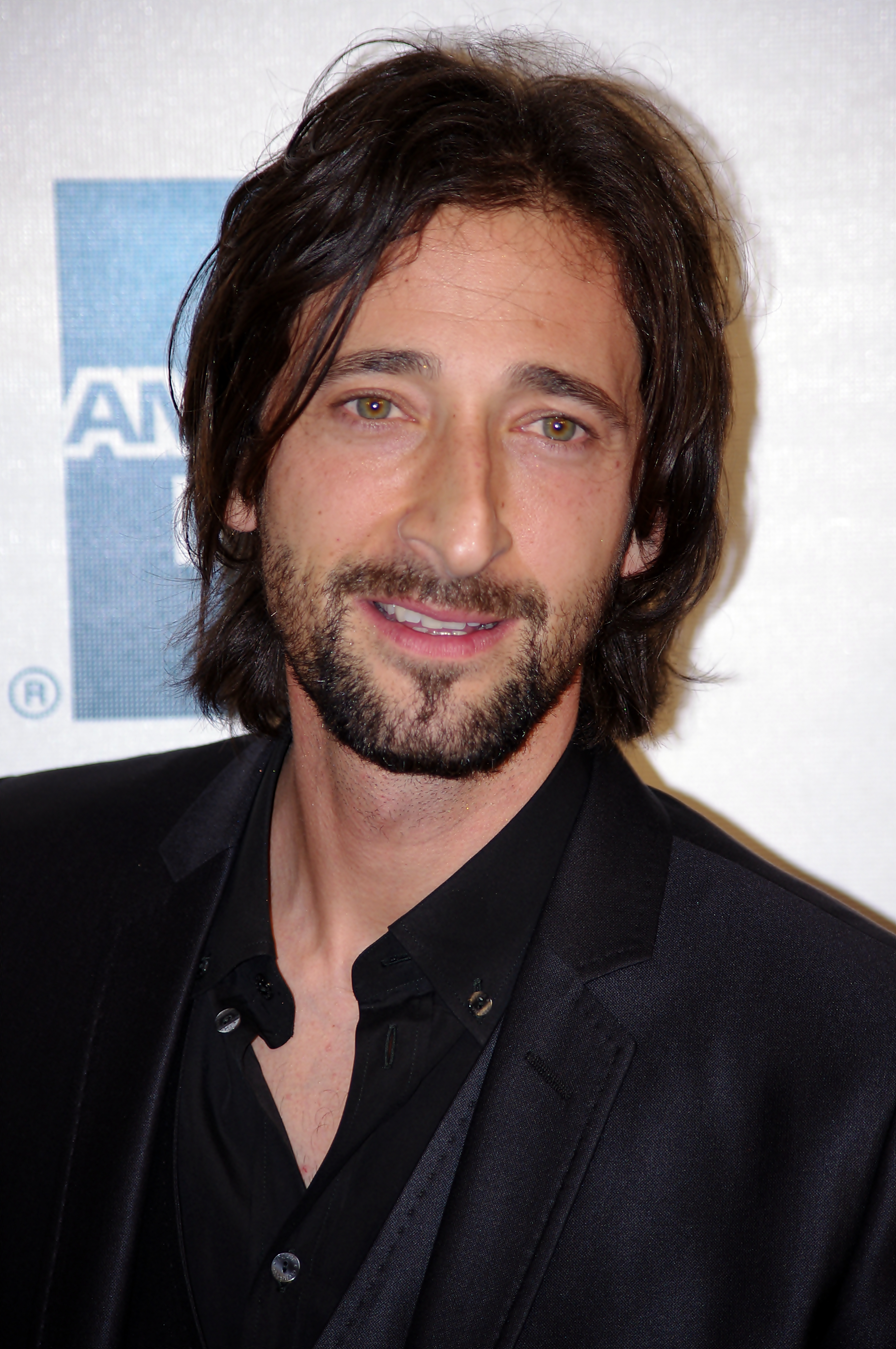
Adrien Brody guest stars in the episode as billionaire investor Josh Aaronson.

"Lion in the Meadow" was written by Jon Brown and directed by husband-and-wife team Shari Springer Berman and Robert Pulcini, who also directed the second season's fourth episode, "Safe Room". The Guardian observed that the episode derives its title from Margaret Mahy's 1969 children's book A Lion in the Meadow.

Adrien Brody guest stars in the episode as Josh Aaronson, an activist shareholder at Waystar RoyCo who brings Logan and Kendall together for the first time in the season. Brody, a fan of the series, was approached for the role by Succession executive producer Adam McKay while in talks to play Pat Riley in HBO's Winning Time: The Rise of the Lakers Dynasty, which McKay executive produced. Brody did not name specific inspirations for the character, but stated, "it was an amalgamation of a number of people I've encountered. It bleeds into some very strong people that I've known—a personality that I've felt is both disarming and dangerous." Brody provided certain input on the creation of the character during conversations with showrunner Jesse Armstrong, such as his costume choices: he stated, "He's someone, I think, who's in touch with his environs. I tried to add to that by [having] him dressed for the adventure." Brody described the character as "much more youthful and present in his position on this planet" than Kendall or Logan.

=== Filming ===
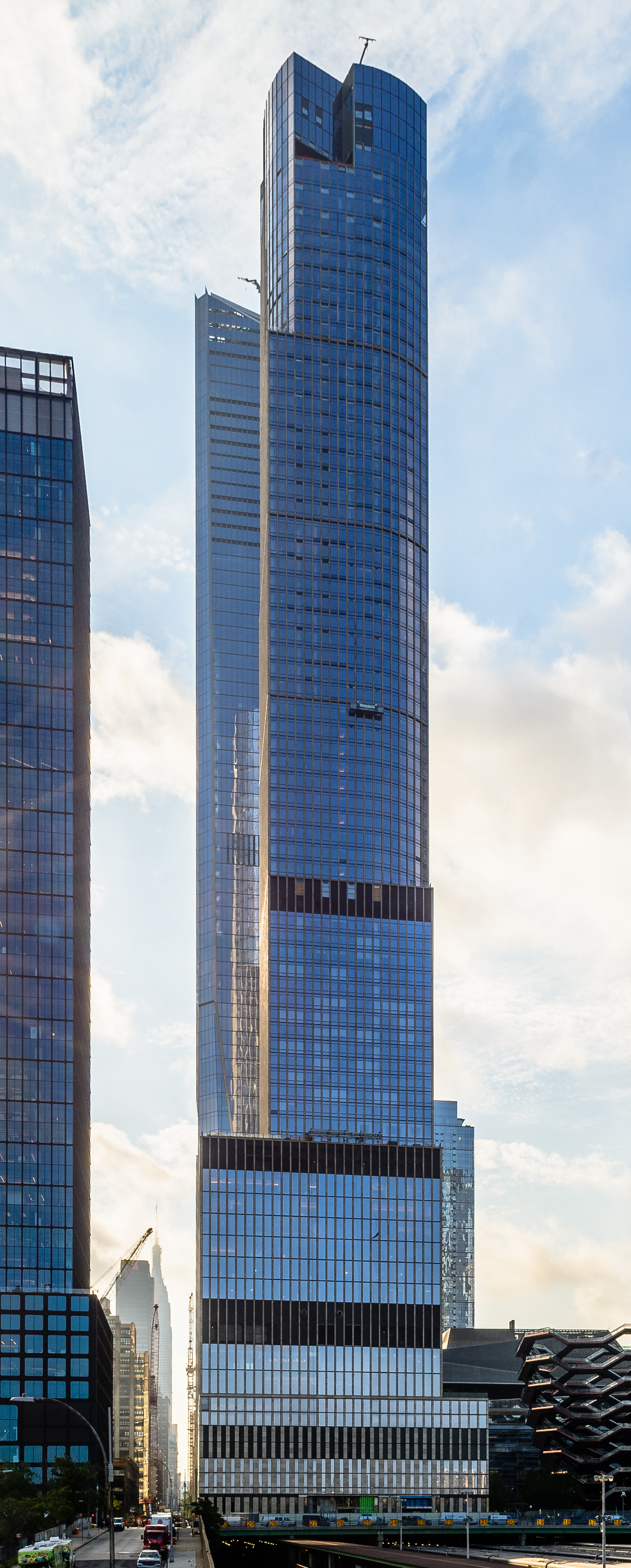
35 Hudson Yards was used as Kendall's apartment, seen prominently for the first time in the episode.

Various locations in East Hampton were used to depict Josh's private island. An owner-occupied mansion in Wainscott was used as Josh's residence; set decorator George DeTitta Jr. fitted the living spaces with a more desaturated color palette to visually foreground the actors and their costumes. Production designer Stephen Carter added that the interiors were decorated to reflect the "hollowness" of the ultra-wealthy, remarking: "You want to feel that these people don't have the creative wherewithal to connect personally to the things in their lives. [...] They're not out combing flea markets looking for the perfect mid-century piece. They're hiring decorators." As for the surrounding land, Carter admitted that the crew used "creative geography" to simulate the house's physical isolation, noting that the real property is situated alongside a public beach and several neighboring estates. The crew filmed additional footage at locations in Montauk, such as Shadmoor State Park and Kirk Park, to capture the rest of the island's topography.

A 90th-floor penthouse suite at 35 Hudson Yards was used as the location for Kendall's apartment, which is seen prominently in the episode after being briefly glimpsed in "The Disruption". According to executive producer Scott Ferguson, the production chose Hudson Yards – which has been frequently maligned by New York architecture critics for its perceived shallowness – because its "polished sheen" provided for an environment devoid of "deeper roots and personal history," which Ferguson said characterized most of the Roys' living spaces. He remarked, "There's a bland interchangeability that's pleasant and beautiful, but doesn't get deeply character-oriented." Carter noted that the Hudson Yards location eliminated the work of having to refit one of the various owner-occupied apartments that the series scouted elsewhere in Manhattan, and described the space chosen for the series as sufficiently "stripped of personality" to be an appropriate living space for Kendall.

== Reception ==
=== Ratings ===
Upon airing, the episode was watched by 0.484 million viewers, with an 18-49 rating of 0.11.

=== Critical reception ===
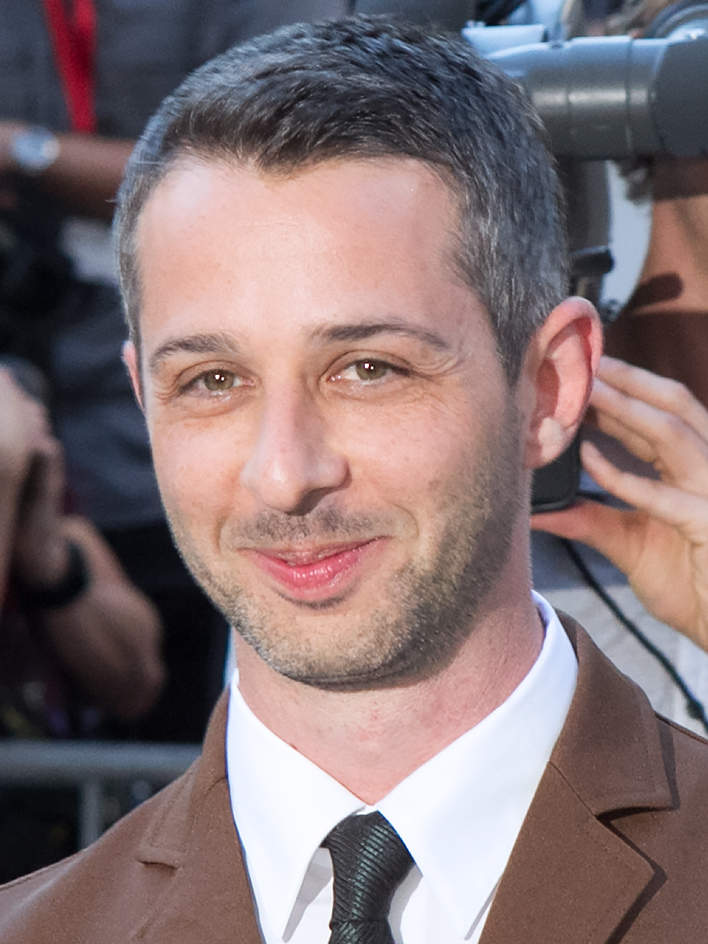
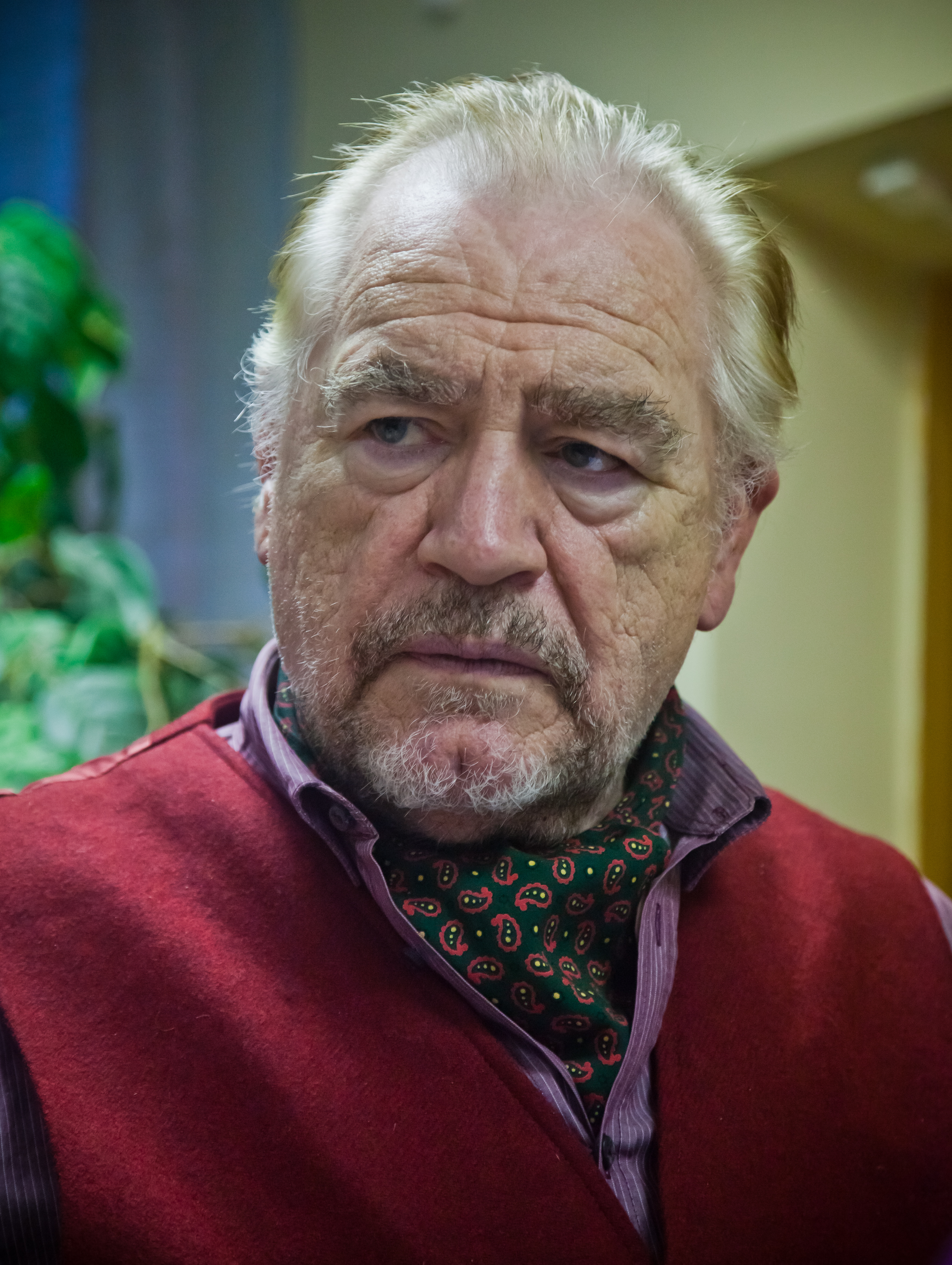
Jeremy Strong and Brian Cox received critical acclaim for their performances in the episode.

"Lion in the Meadow" received highly positive reviews, with praise going towards the episode's direction, humor, and the performances of Brian Cox, Jeremy Strong, and guest star Adrien Brody. Scott Tobias of Vulture gave the episode 5 out of 5 stars, writing, "Power has always been a central theme of 'Succession', but 'Lion in the Meadow' articulates it with stunning comprehensiveness." Tobias praised the dramatic tension during the interplay between Kendall and Logan, and described Greg's scenes in the episode as the character's funniest in the series thus far. Noel Murray of The New York Times felt the episode brought "some much-needed comic relief alongside the ongoing melodrama" after the "punishingly bleak" third episode, describing the episode's focus on "subtler power plays" between the Roys as "so oddly delightful." Murray wrote that the episode's primary strengths were the "vigorous one-upmanship" between Kendall, Logan and Josh, and the subplots focusing on Tom and Greg, whom Murray called the series' most "reliably comic" characters.

Roxana Hadadi of The A.V. Club gave the episode a B, highlighting the episode's focus on Logan's deteriorating strength, and its depiction of the Roys finally "peer[ing] outside their own sphere of self-absorption to consider the other people who make up Waystar Royco." Hadadi felt Brody "excelled" at portraying an "entitled, smarmy jerk," and praised the "thoughtful" work by the directors and costume designer Michelle Matland for visually presenting Kendall and Logan as "mirrors, with dark jackets, dark baseball caps, dark pants, and constantly worn sunglasses." Alan Sepinwall of Rolling Stone praised how the episode integrated Brody's character into the storytelling, writing: "Many comparable prestige dramas would build seasons at this stage around a new antagonist arriving to cause trouble for the Roys. [...] Ultimately, though, Jesse Armstrong and company understand that the Roys are the whole shebang. Outsiders can crash the party to stir up trouble, but they’re ultimately tools to pit the main characters against one another." Sepinwall described the episode's climax as "another great Cox/Strong duet, and simultaneously a reminder of how far apart the two have become during this war."

=== Accolades ===
At the 74th Directors Guild of America Awards, Robert Pulcini and Shari Springer Berman were nominated for the Directors Guild of America Award for Outstanding Directing – Drama Series for the episode.

Adrien Brody was nominated for the Primetime Emmy Award for Outstanding Guest Actor in a Drama Series for this episode, one of four nominations of the series in this category at the 74th ceremony.
