= What It Takes (Succession) =

- Succession episode
- Episode no.: Season 3 Episode 6
- Directed by: Andrij Parekh
- Written by: Will Tracy
- Cinematography by: Patrick Capone
- Original air date: November 21, 2021
- Running time: 59 minutes

Guest appearances
- Sanaa Lathan as Lisa Arthur; Linda Emond as Michelle-Anne Vanderhoven; Justin Kirk as Jeryd Mencken; Reed Birney as Vice President Dave Boyer; Yul Vazquez as Rick Salgado; Stephen Root as Ron Petkus; Scott Nicholson as Colin; Zoë Winters as Kerry; Zack Robidas as Mark Ravenhead; Juliana Canfield as Jess Jordan; Mark Linn-Baker as Maxim Pierce; Dasha Nekrasova as Comfry; Jordan Lage as Keith; Pip Torrens (photograph) as Peter Munion

Episode chronology
← Previous "Retired Janitors of Idaho"	Next → "Too Much Birthday"
- Succession season 3

"What It Takes" is the sixth episode of the third season of the American satirical comedy-drama television series Succession, and the 26th episode overall. It was written by Will Tracy and directed by Andrij Parekh, and originally aired on HBO on November 21, 2021.

The episode follows the Roys traveling to a conservative political conference in Richmond, Virginia to choose a suitable presidential candidate in the upcoming election, while Kendall prepares to testify against his father.

Sanaa Lathan received a nomination for Outstanding Guest Actress in a Drama Series at the 74th Primetime Emmy Awards for her performance in the episode.

== Plot ==
Kendall prepares to submit the paperwork he has retrieved on the cruises scandal to the Department of Justice. Lisa warns him that the documents may not be sufficient legal ammunition to build a winning case against Waystar, but Kendall refuses to listen.

Meanwhile, the rest of the Roys attend the Future Freedom Summit, a conservative political donor event in Richmond, Virginia, in search of a viable presidential candidate in the upcoming election in light of the current President choosing not to run for reelection. Logan primarily seeks a nominee who will temper the DOJ investigation into the cruises scandal and help Waystar survive against Big Tech. He and the Republican establishment lean towards Dave Boyer, the incumbent Vice President.

At the Summit, Roman is surprised to learn from an attendee that his mother Caroline is marrying British CEO Peter Munion, and that the family have been invited to their wedding in Tuscany; he and Shiv call Kendall to inform him of the news. Connor uses the event as an opportunity to advance his own presidential bid. Roman is approached by Congressman Jeryd Mencken, a controversial, right-wing online provocateur.

Late in the night, Tom – who has resigned himself to the fate of incarceration and is receiving little support from Shiv – takes an equally paranoid Greg to a nearby diner for the two to share their anxieties over their shared legal peril. Tom agrees to absorb responsibility for Greg's role in the cruises cover-up.

The next day, Kendall's DOJ testimony goes poorly; he expresses frustration at having to cooperate with federal authorities—whom Logan has worked to stall—instead of taking an aggressive approach against the company. Lisa, losing patience with Kendall, bluntly informs him that he performed poorly at the testimony and that his case against his father is weakening. Kendall later decides to fire Lisa and seeks out new legal representation.

Shiv is approached at the convention by Congressman Rick Salgado, a traditional conservative who suggests that as president, he can pave a path for Shiv to become CEO of Waystar. During the candidates' dinner, Boyer and Salgado come at odds with Mencken, whom Shiv detests due to his fascist leanings, though Mencken draws attention for being the only candidate to dismiss ATN as politically irrelevant.

Logan gathers his family to his suite to field opinions on the candidates. Shiv supports Salgado while Roman takes a liking to Mencken; Shiv's concern over Mencken's fascist agenda goes ignored. Connor advocates for himself, though the idea is quickly dismissed. Boyer is ruled out after Logan deems him weak and ineffectual.

Tom receives a call from Kendall, who has arrived in Virginia, to meet with him privately at the nearby diner. Kendall suggests that Tom can avoid incarceration if he testifies against Logan, but Tom refuses, telling Kendall he has watched him fail against his father too many times to believe in him now. Kendall takes a photo of Tom as he leaves to use as potential blackmail.

Roman meets with Mencken in the bathroom of Logan's suite to understand his political philosophy, and realizes that Mencken's extreme views and nationalist rhetoric can significantly boost ATN's viewership. Mencken agrees to take Waystar's support. In the suite, Roman suggests to Logan that Mencken's candidacy will earn ATN the advertising revenue Waystar needs to fend off Big Tech and acquire streaming giant GoJo. Logan is convinced and decides to back Mencken despite Shiv's protests. The next morning, Shiv reluctantly participates in a family photoshoot with Mencken on Logan's orders.

== Production ==
"What It Takes" was written by Will Tracy, former editor-in-chief of The Onion and writer of season 2's "Tern Haven", and directed by Andrij Parekh in his fourth episode for the series. Several critics inferred that the episode's title is derived from Richard Ben Cramer's book What It Takes: The Way to the White House, a seminal text on American politics that recounts the 1988 United States presidential election.

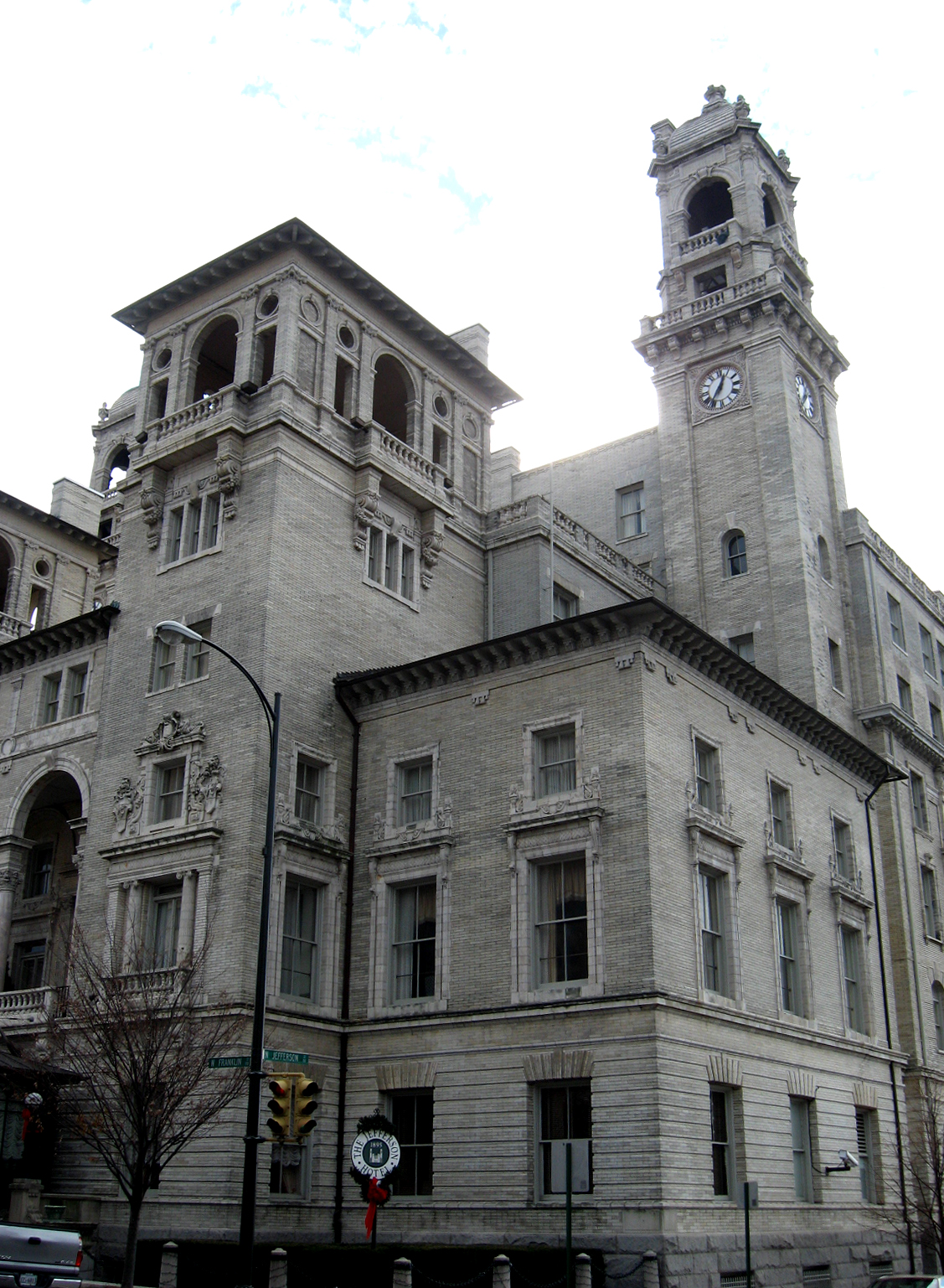
The episode primarily takes place at the Jefferson Hotel in Richmond, Virginia.

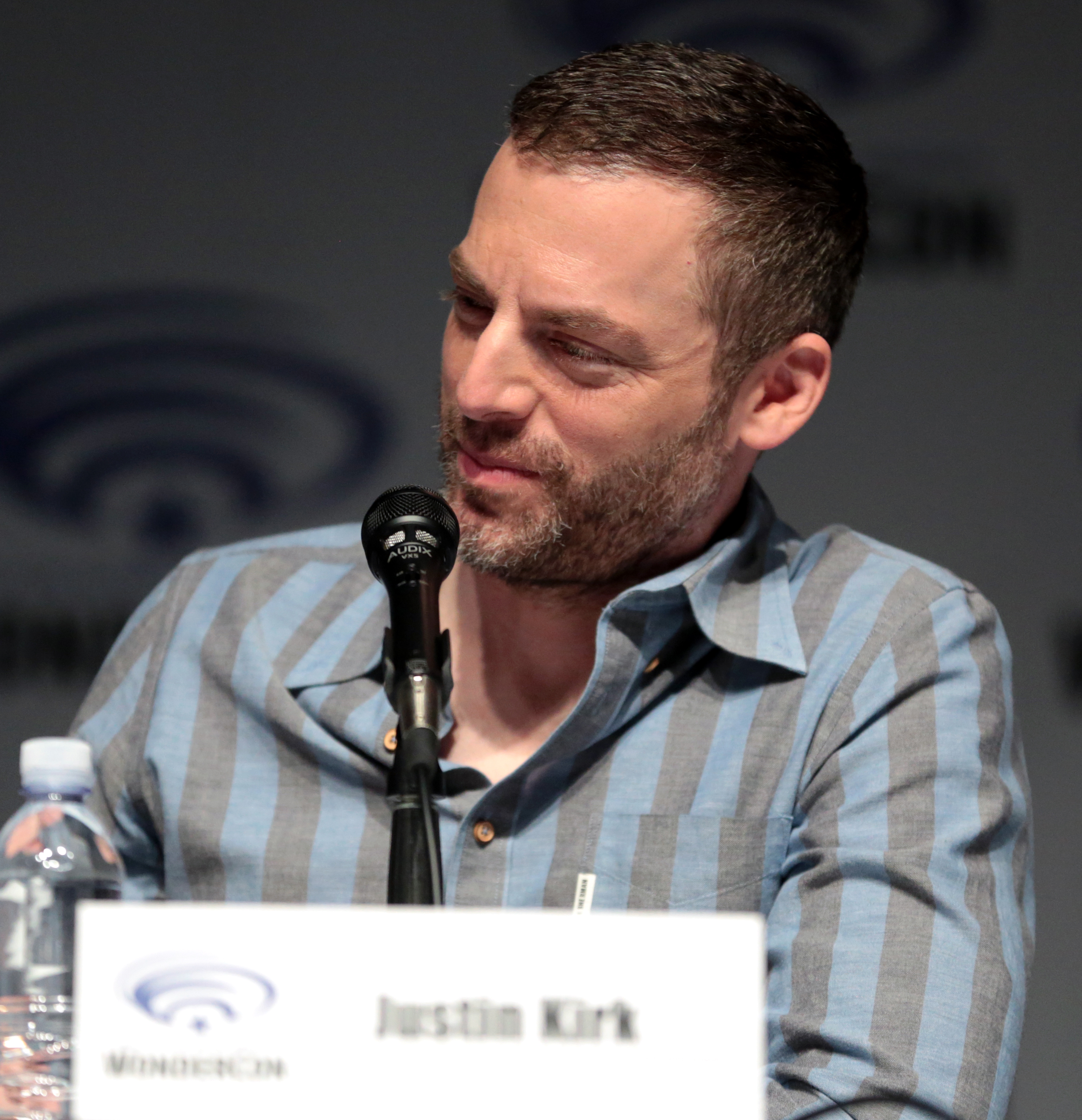
Justin Kirk guest stars in the episode as controversial right-wing Congressman Jeryd Mencken.

Justin Kirk guest stars in the episode as Congressman Jeryd Mencken, a far-right online provocateur with fascist and white supremacist leanings. Critics frequently compared the character to Jordan Peterson, while also finding similarities to other controversial right-wing figures such as Josh Hawley, Stefan Molyneux, Alex Jones, and Marjorie Taylor Greene. Reviewers felt Kirk's casting was against type, with Wenlei Ma of News.com.au writing, "Kirk is a great bit of casting because he's primarily played likeable if immature guys – most notably Andy Botwin in Weeds. It's hard to hate his face, which makes his character all the more dangerous." Similarly, Cassie Da Costa of Vanity Fair felt that Kirk, whom she described as a "nice-guy character actor", made a "startling turn" in his role on Succession.

Other notable guest stars in the episode include Stephen Root (who has appeared in numerous prior HBO series) as Ron Petkus, the lecherous organizer of the Future Freedom Summit; Reed Birney as Vice President Dave Boyer (Birney also played Vice President Donald Blythe in House of Cards); Mark Linn-Baker, reprising his role from "Tern Haven" as Maxim Pierce; and Yul Vazquez as Congressman Rick Salgado, a moderate Republican whose character drew comparisons to Marco Rubio. Pip Torrens appears in a photograph as Caroline's fiancée Peter Munion, having been cast in a recurring role in the season.

Filming for the episode took place in April 2021. Some portions – largely exterior shots – were filmed on location in Richmond, with the Jefferson Hotel serving as the locale for the Future Freedom Summit. Interior scenes were largely shot in New York, primarily at the Plaza Hotel – whose Grand Ballroom was used as the venue for the candidates' dinner, the Palm Court for the episode's ending, and the Royal Suite where Mencken and Roman met up in the bathroom and the family had a discussion about the candidates.

== Reception ==
=== Ratings ===
Upon airing, the episode was watched by 0.525 million viewers, with an 18-49 rating of 0.10.

=== Critical reception ===
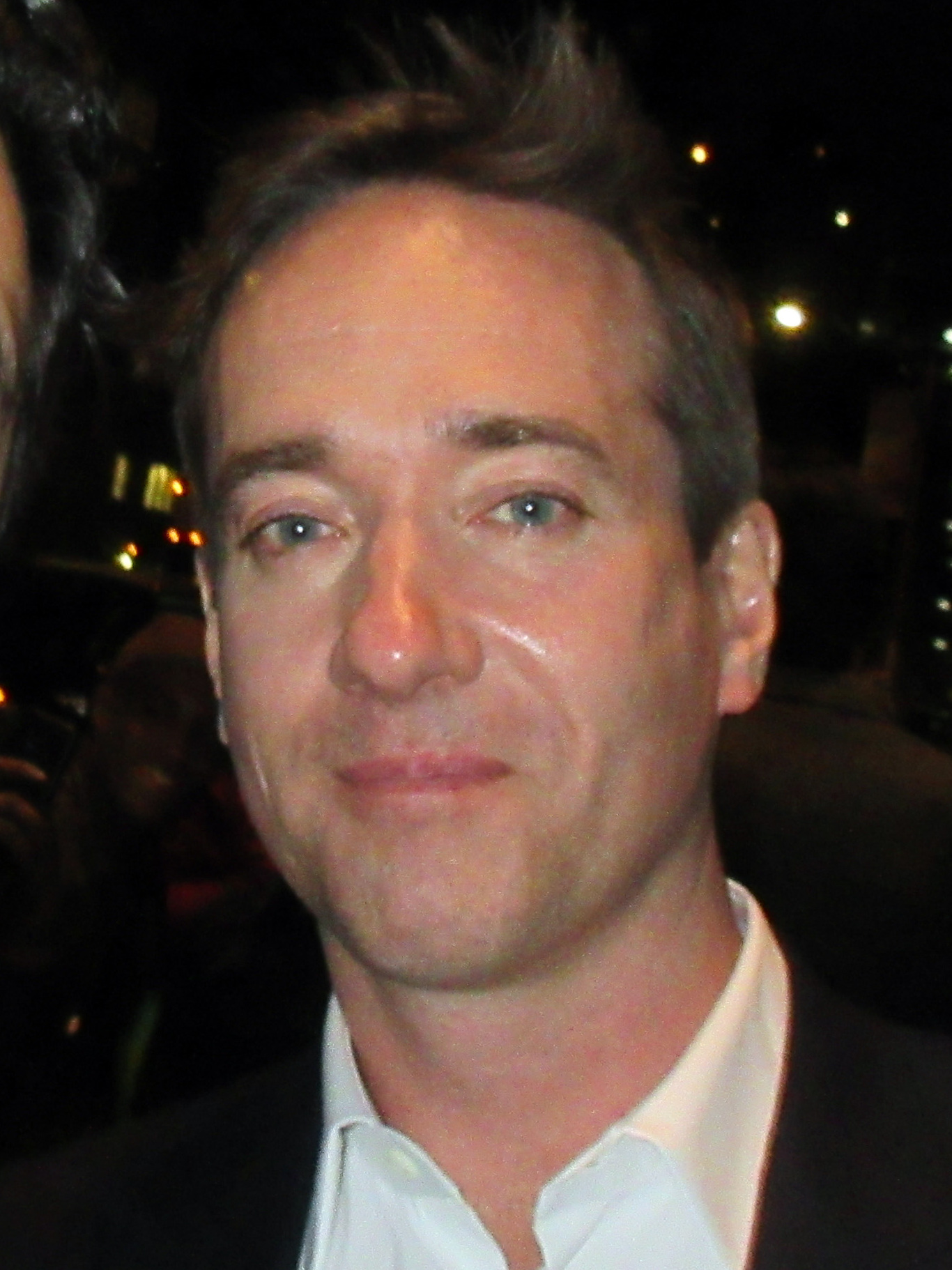
Matthew Macfadyen's performance in the episode was frequently singled out for praise by critics.

"What It Takes" received critical acclaim, with reviewers praising the episode's script, performances (particularly Matthew Macfadyen's), and examination of U.S. politics, which several critics felt heightened the series' dramatic stakes. Roxana Hadadi of The A.V. Club gave the episode an A, calling it "an absolute tornado of an hour, full of the pointedly cruel, quiveringly pathetic, and amusingly melodramatic stuff that makes Succession great." Hadadi wrote that the episode excelled at showing how the Roys' "ensconced toxicity spreads outward, how it enacts and enables, in all ways big and small," and particularly praised Macfadyen's "phenomenal" performance as Tom, describing it as "a deeply empathetic mix of resigned and curious, resentful and dismissive, polite and aggressive" and likening his scenes with Kendall to a "tennis match." Scott Tobias of Vulture gave the episode 5 out of 5 stars, praising its depiction of the "opaque" way in which presidential candidates are selected behind closed doors. He felt that the series "needed an episode like 'What It Takes' for a long time" given its overarching parallels to the Murdoch and Trump families. Lili Loofbourow of Slate, noting a sitcom-like quality in the recurring lack of consequences for many of the events depicted on the series thus far, felt that the episode's introduction of a white nationalist character provided stakes for the series that "extend[ed] beyond its hermetic corporate world."

Alan Sepinwall of Rolling Stone felt the episode represented the series at "both its funniest and most horrifying," stating that the episode's narrative "felt uncomfortably close" to real-world politics, particularly Fox News' increasingly positive coverage of the Donald Trump 2016 presidential campaign as Trump began winning more viewers' votes than establishment candidates. Sepinwall additionally praised both Kirk and Stephen Root's guest performances, as well as the subplot involving Tom and Kendall. Ben Travers of IndieWire reserved praise for Tom's character development, writing that Macfadyen was "in peak form," and described Kirk's guest performance as "devilishly charismatic." He gave the episode an A−. Philippa Snow of The Independent gave the episode 5 out of 5 stars, writing that the episode "mercilessly underscores the influence Logan has on the political landscape of Succession's version of America." However, Snow noted that the script occasionally lent weight to viewers' complaints that "the show's writers have become aware – too aware, to the point of pandering – of its audience's tendency to screenshot and tweet to death its most memeable lines."

Some reviewers were less enthusiastic about the episode's increased focus on politics. In a review of the season overall, Daniel Fienberg of The Hollywood Reporter wrote that the political element of the Roys' story comes across as "a little more on-the-nose than [his] preferred version of Succession," feeling that the series "thrives when it's bathing in Trump-adjacent waters." Angie Han, who co-authored the review, agreed, writing, "The discussions the characters have on the show feel a bit behind the times, like they're only now coming around to the lessons that we in the real world have been grappling with for four or five years already." She concluded that the series "fares better at digging into the rotten systems that the Roys are already entrenched in." Also reviewing the season as a whole, Sophie Gilbert of The Atlantic felt that "What It Takes" made "an unsubtle point about the consequences for everyone when familial squabbling has global repercussions."

=== Accolades ===
Andrij Parekh was nominated for the Directors Guild of America Award for Outstanding Directing – Drama Series at the 74th Directors Guild of America Awards for the episode.

At the 74th Primetime Emmy Awards, Sanaa Lathan, who plays Lisa Arthur, received a nomination for Outstanding Guest Actress in a Drama Series for her performance in the episode, one of three nominations of the series in this category.
