= Retired Janitors of Idaho =

- Succession episode
- Episode no.: Season 3 Episode 5
- Directed by: Kevin Bray
- Written by: Tony Roche; Susan Soon He Stanton
- Cinematography by: Christopher Norr
- Original air date: November 14, 2021
- Running time: 61 minutes

Guest appearances
- Arian Moayed as Stewy Hosseini; James Cromwell as Ewan Roy; Jeannie Berlin as Cyd Peach; Peter Riegert as Roger Pugh; Adrien Brody as Josh Aaronson; Hope Davis as Sandi Furness; Scott Nicholson as Colin; Zoë Winters as Kerry; Larry Pine as Sandy Furness; Juliana Canfield as Jess Jordan; Jihae as Berry Schneider; Dasha Nekrasova as Comfry; Swayam Bhatia (voice) as Sophie Roy; Patch Darragh as Ray; KeiLyn Durrel Jones as Remi

Episode chronology
| ← Previous "Lion in the Meadow" | Next → "What It Takes" |
- Succession season 3

"Retired Janitors of Idaho" is the fifth episode of the third season of the American satirical comedy-drama television series Succession, and the 25th episode overall. It was written by Tony Roche and Susan Soon He Stanton and directed by Kevin Bray, and originally aired on HBO on November 14, 2021.

The episode focuses on the Roys scrambling to broker a deal with Stewy and Sandi during the Waystar RoyCo annual shareholder meeting.

At the 74th Primetime Emmy Awards, guest stars James Cromwell, Hope Davis and Arian Moayed all received nominations for their performances in the episode.

== Plot ==
An ailing Logan arrives at the Waystar RoyCo annual shareholder meeting, where both his and Kendall's factions are attempting to reach a settlement with Sandy and Stewy – aware that if the question of ownership were left to a vote (per Logan's wishes), the Roys would almost certainly lose control of the company. They opt to stall the vote until an agreement can be successfully reached. Frank is tasked with giving a protracted speech to the shareholders in the meantime.

Kendall convinces Stewy to continue negotiating with Waystar. Gerri, Shiv, Roman and Karl meet with Stewy, Sandi and Sandy (whose illness has rendered him unable to walk and barely able to speak, with his daughter negotiating on his behalf). Controversy arises over Sandy's request for veto power over any Roy family member being named CEO, which the Roys' side knows is designed to humiliate Logan. Gerri convinces Sandi and Stewy to think over the terms once more.

Connor approaches Logan with a request to be named head of one of Waystar's European cable divisions. Logan, struggling to speak and repeatedly needing to urinate, does not answer conclusively, and expresses displeasure at having to navigate around Sandy's terms on the settlement. Kendall, meanwhile, warns Greg that he may give him up to the DOJ unless Greg reneges on the joint defense agreement he signed with Waystar. Greg attempts to negotiate with Ewan and Pugh, but Ewan, disgusted with his grandson's enduring loyalty to Logan's company, informs him he is donating his entire estate to Greenpeace, effectively depriving Greg of an inheritance.

Sandi calls Gerri to relay an alternative request: curtailing the Roys' use of private jets, which the family similarly scoffs at. Logan orders that they refuse the terms, leaving the company's ownership to the shareholders' vote. Logan has Tom escort him to the restroom and experiences difficulty urinating; Shiv learns from Logan's assistant Kerry that Logan has a urinary tract infection that he demanded be kept secret. The others realize that Logan has forgotten to take his medication and notice him becoming increasingly incoherent and in need of medical attention. Kendall storms in, having received word of the vote, and angrily demands the settlement renegotiated.

Gerri takes over for Frank in giving speeches to the shareholders. An unconscious Logan is sequestered to another room to be looked after by his personal doctor, thereby rendering him incapable of appearing onstage. Shiv opts to renegotiate the settlement with Sandi and Stewy without Logan's input. The President suddenly calls asking for Logan; Roman takes the call in his father's place and learns that the President will not be seeking a second term, in large part due to blowback from ATN's attacks on his mental faculties (which Logan himself had ordered in hopes that the DOJ investigation would be relaxed).

Shiv meets with Sandi privately; the two agree to an extra board seat for both factions, each of which could potentially go to either of the two women. Shiv calls Tom and has him relay the final terms of the settlement to the rest of the company's senior management, who agree to sign the deal without Logan's final approval. While celebrating, Shiv is put off when Tom lets slip that he has been tracking her fertility in hopes of impregnating her before going to prison.

Gerri brings Karl onstage to announce the settlement to pleased shareholders. However, Kendall, aware of the settlement but indignant at being left out of the spotlight, interrupts Karl's speech and makes an impromptu statement voicing support for the victims of the cruises scandal, frustrating the audience and confusing the rest of the company management. Greg informs Tom he intends to sue Greenpeace as a ploy to recover his inheritance from his grandfather. Logan warns Gerri that the President's decision not to seek reelection jeopardizes Waystar's political and legal survival. He remains displeased with Shiv for acquiescing to Sandy's terms.

While reviewing reactions to his onstage stunt with his PR team, Kendall is informed that Logan requests a meeting with him, but upon arriving, he learns that Logan already left, and realizes his father has snubbed him. He attempts to call Logan, but Logan has Kendall's phone number blocked permanently.

== Production ==
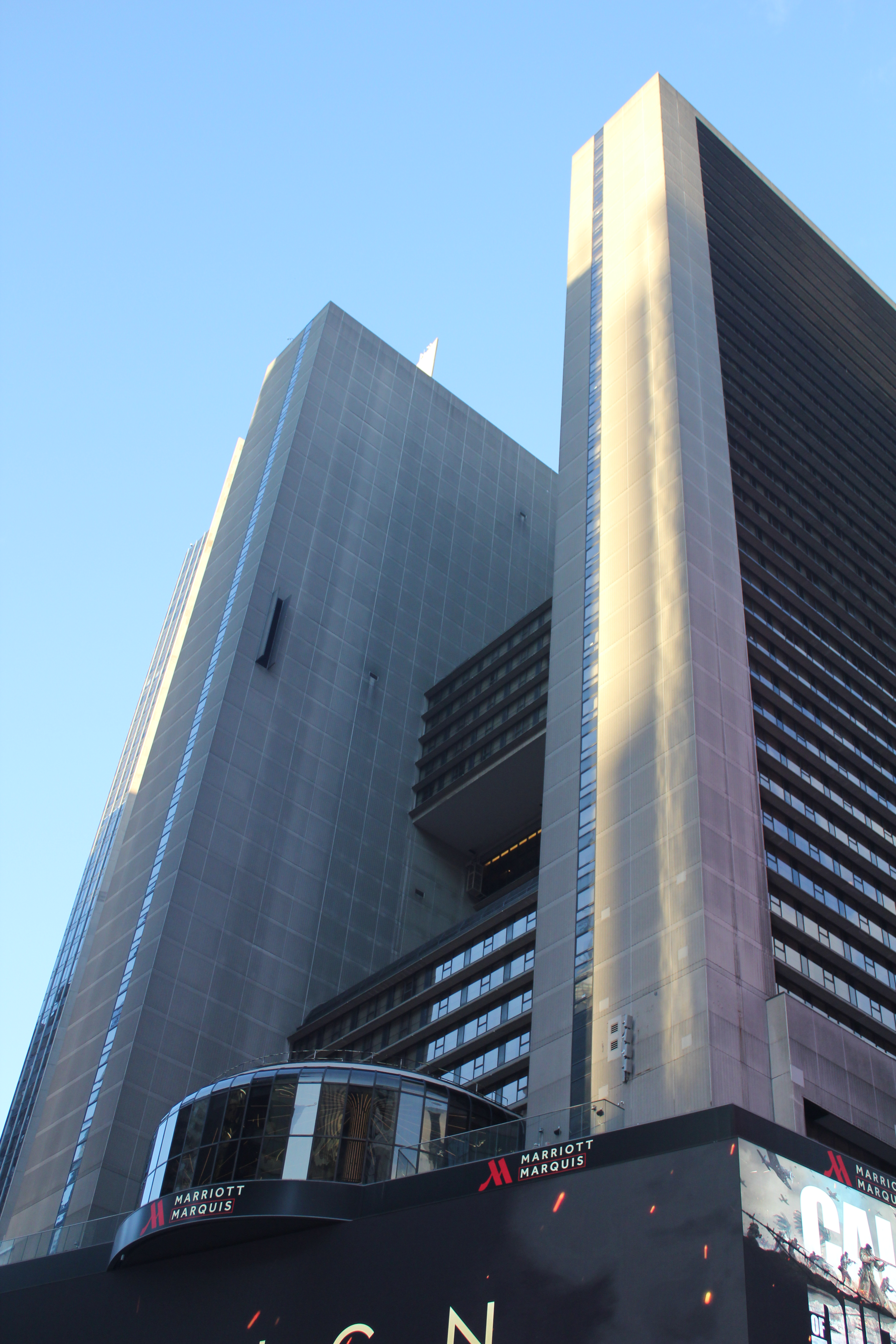
The episode takes place at the New York Marriott Marquis.

"Retired Janitors of Idaho" was written by Tony Roche and Susan Soon He Stanton and directed by Kevin Bray. The episode derives its title from a line spoken by Roman dismissively referring to the wider body of Waystar shareholders.

The episode was filmed at the New York Marriott Marquis in Times Square.

== Reception ==
=== Ratings ===
Upon airing, the episode was watched by 0.584 million viewers, with an 18-49 rating of 0.14.

=== Critical reception ===
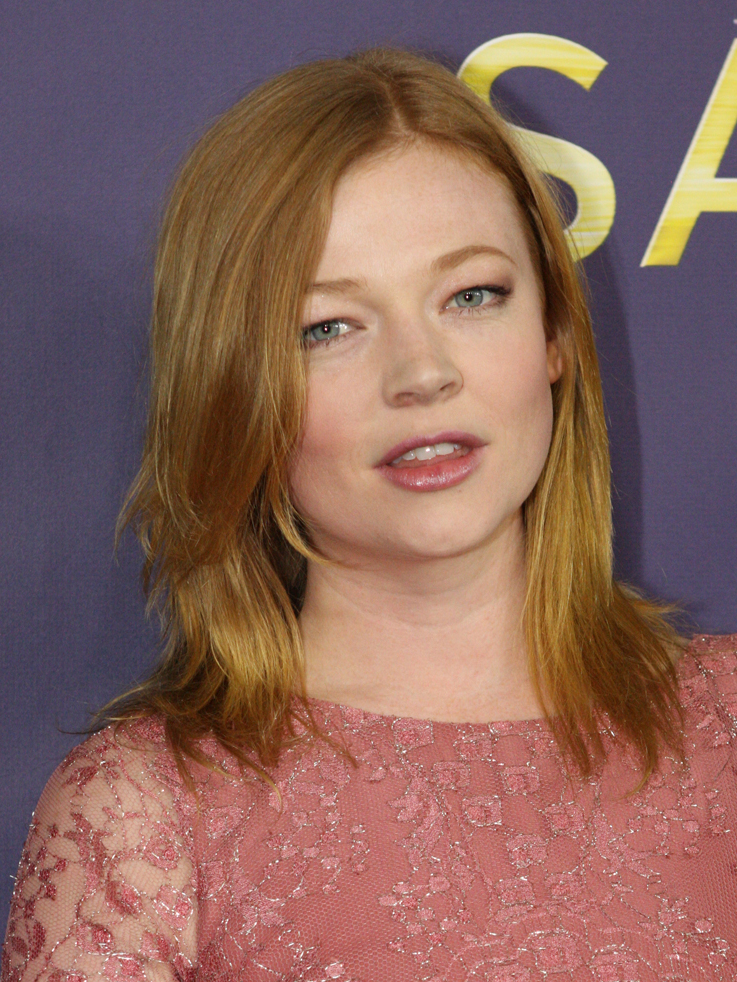
Sarah Snook's performance in the episode received critical acclaim.

"Retired Janitors of Idaho" received largely positive reviews, with critics praising the episode's tension, humor, and performances (particularly that of Snook), though some felt it a retread of the series' established themes. Scott Tobias of Vulture gave the episode 4 out of 5 stars, calling it "nerve-jangling" in its depiction of the Roys jockeying for control of the company. Tobias praised the "wonderful" subplot involving Greg, and noted how the episode highlighted the Roy siblings' incompetence compared to that of Waystar's senior management. Alan Sepinwall of Rolling Stone called the episode a "wild, incredibly funny hour of Succession doing nearly all of what it does best." Sepinwall praised how Logan's illness lent the episode an "especially chaotic" quality, as well as commending the way the episode resolved the seasons-long Sandy-Stewy plotline, writing: "It's the mark of a confident show that such a major story arc could be resolved only midway through a season." Ben Travers of IndieWire gave the episode an A, calling it "a classic Succession episode — part ticking-clock thriller, part tragedy of the common man, part black-comic laugh riot." Travers highlighted the decision to confine all the characters to a single space, praising both the writers for the episode's humor and director Kevin Bray for capturing "an incredible array of outstanding reactions" from the ensemble.

Roxana Hadadi of The A.V. Club gave the episode a B+, praising the humor and Arian Moayed's performance as Stewy, but noting "a sort of recurring quality" to the episode's depiction of character dynamics that the series had already explored prior. She wrote: "'Retired Janitors of Idaho' crystallizes two things we already know: Logan is infirm, and the Roy children cannot run this company together." Similarly, Spencer Kornhaber of The Atlantic wrote that the series "feels a bit stuck in a holding pattern in this season," stating that the episode embodied the challenge of "reckon[ing] with the possibilities of a post-Logan world" for both the characters and the series. However, Kornhaber praised how the episode depicted the "gravitational heft that America gives particular men, and the chaos that ensues when mortality wobbles them," noting how the outcome of the shareholder meeting was ultimately determined by the "machinations of powerful guys whose ruthlessness seems inversely proportional to their health."

=== Accolades ===
TVLine named Sarah Snook the "Performer of the Week" for the week of November 20, 2021, for her performance in the episode. The site wrote "This week, we saw Shiv hit new heights of influence and then come crashing down to new lows during a pivotal shareholders' meeting, and Snook masterfully revealed the layers of hard-charging ambition and tender vulnerability lurking just beneath Shiv’s polished façade."

Tony Roche and Susan Soon He Stanton won the Writers Guild of America Award for Television: Episodic Drama at the 74th Writers Guild of America Awards for the episode. Additionally, Kevin Bray was nominated for the Directors Guild of America Award for Outstanding Directing – Drama Series at the 74th Directors Guild of America Awards. At the 74th Primetime Emmy Awards, Nicholas Braun was nominated for Outstanding Supporting Actor in a Drama Series. In addition, both James Cromwell and Arian Moayed were nominated for Outstanding Guest Actor in a Drama Series, while Hope Davis was nominated for Outstanding Guest Actress in a Drama Series.
