= Chiantishire (Succession) =

- Succession episode
- Episode no.: Season 3 Episode 8
- Directed by: Mark Mylod
- Written by: Jesse Armstrong
- Cinematography by: Patrick Capone
- Original air date: December 5, 2021
- Running time: 65 minutes

Guest appearances
- Hiam Abbass as Marcia Roy; Arian Moayed as Stewy Hosseini; Harriet Walter as Lady Caroline Collingwood; Hope Davis as Sandi Furness; Alexander Skarsgård as Lukas Matsson; Pip Torrens as Peter Munion; Scott Nicholson as Colin; Zoë Winters as Kerry; Dasha Nekrasova as Comfry Pellits; Ella Rumpf as the contessa; Tomas Arana as Laurie; Quentin Morales as Iverson Roy; Swayam Bhatia as Sophie Roy

Episode chronology
← Previous "Too Much Birthday"	Next → "All the Bells Say"
- Succession season 3

"Chiantishire" is the eighth and penultimate episode of the third season of the American satirical comedy-drama television series Succession, and the 28th episode overall. It was written by series creator Jesse Armstrong and directed by Mark Mylod, and originally aired on HBO on December 5, 2021.

The episode follows the Roys visiting Tuscany to attend the wedding of Logan's second wife, Lady Caroline Collingwood, while working to finalize Waystar's acquisition of streaming giant GoJo.

"Chiantishire" was nominated for three Primetime Emmy Awards at the 74th ceremony, including for Outstanding Guest Actress in a Drama Series for Harriet Walter's performance.

== Plot ==
At a Waystar board meeting, Stewy and Sandi are brought up to date on the company's plans to acquire GoJo. Afterwards, the Roys depart for Tuscany to attend Caroline's wedding to Peter Munion – who Roman discovers is trailing a string of failed marriages and business ventures, and is likely using the wedding to edge closer to Waystar. Caroline, however, brushes off his concerns. Connor proposes to an apprehensive Willa in front of other wedding guests, hoping to deflect the press from probing into her background as a sex worker. Gerri asks Roman, who is jealous of Gerri's relationship with a former DOJ attorney, to stop sending her unsolicited photos of his penis.

A self-righteous Kendall demands a sit-down with Logan over dinner, where he requests taking the $2 billion buyout Logan offered on Kendall's birthday to permanently uncouple himself from his father's "evil" and "corrupt" empire. Logan coldly refuses and balks at the notion that he is a bad person, invoking the waiter's death (Note: As depicted in "Nobody Is Ever Missing".) to argue that he has been the one to rectify Kendall's every mistake and reprimands him for his hypocrisy for criticizing his business while benefiting from it his entire life.

While out on a bachelorette night in Cortona, Caroline admits to Shiv that she never wanted children, and encourages Shiv not to bear a child herself. Out of spite, Shiv in turn asks to have a child with Tom, but tells him outright during sex, ostensibly as "dirty talk," that she does not love him and that their marriage is inherently one-sided. The following day, Shiv passes off her comments as foreplay and discusses with Tom the option of freezing her embryos to ensure the survival of her progeny in the event of their divorce or deaths. A baffled Tom simply wishes to conceive a child with her in the near-term.

GoJo's stock price soars after Lukas Matsson sends tweets insinuating that he is about to receive major financing, much to Waystar's concern. Roman meets Matsson at his villa in Lake Maggiore and learns that Matsson is interested in a merger of equals with Waystar rather than an acquisition.

Logan, Roman, Shiv, Tom and Gerri travel to Milan to meet with GoJo's bankers. Roman relays Matsson's interest in a merger to Logan, who accepts the decision and applauds his son for his shrewd thinking. However, the meeting is derailed when Roman accidentally sends a photo of his penis to Logan instead of Gerri. Logan confronts Roman over his sexual proclivities and ponders firing Gerri to avoid blowback, which Roman advises against. Shiv, hoping to undermine Roman and Gerri at the same time, suggests to Gerri that she formally file a sexual harassment complaint against him, but Gerri refuses to engage.

Kendall, meanwhile, drunkenly lies face-down on a pool float, and allows his head to sink into the water.

== Production ==
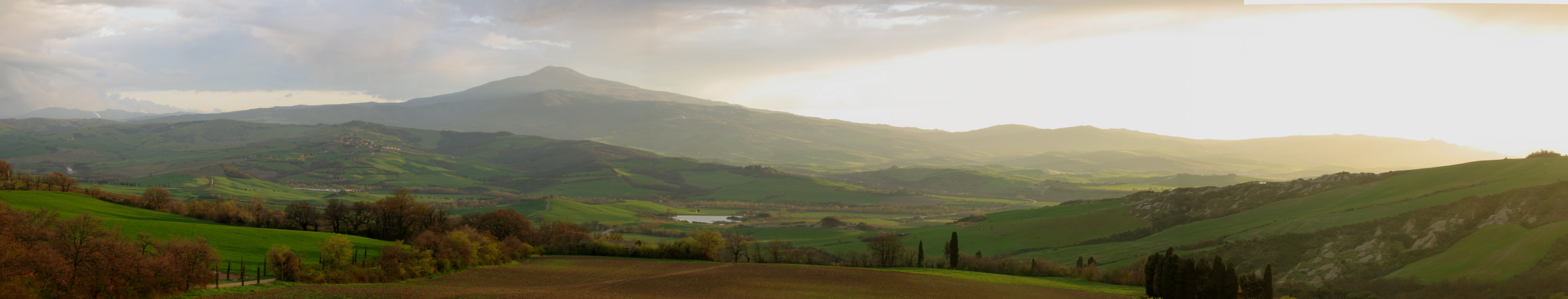
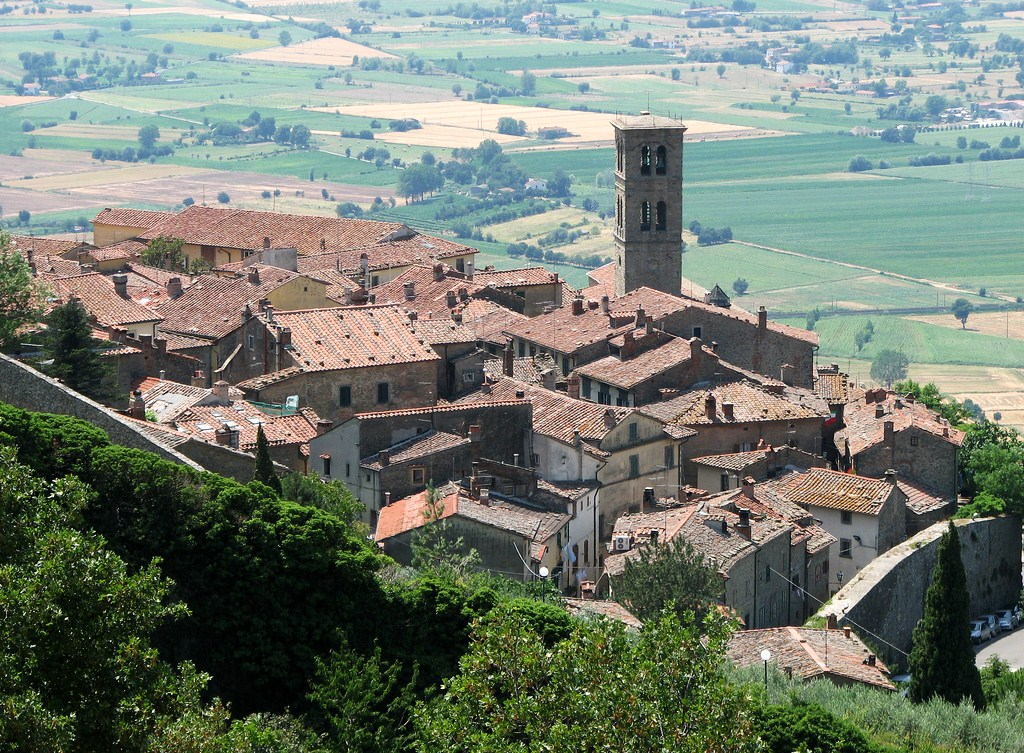
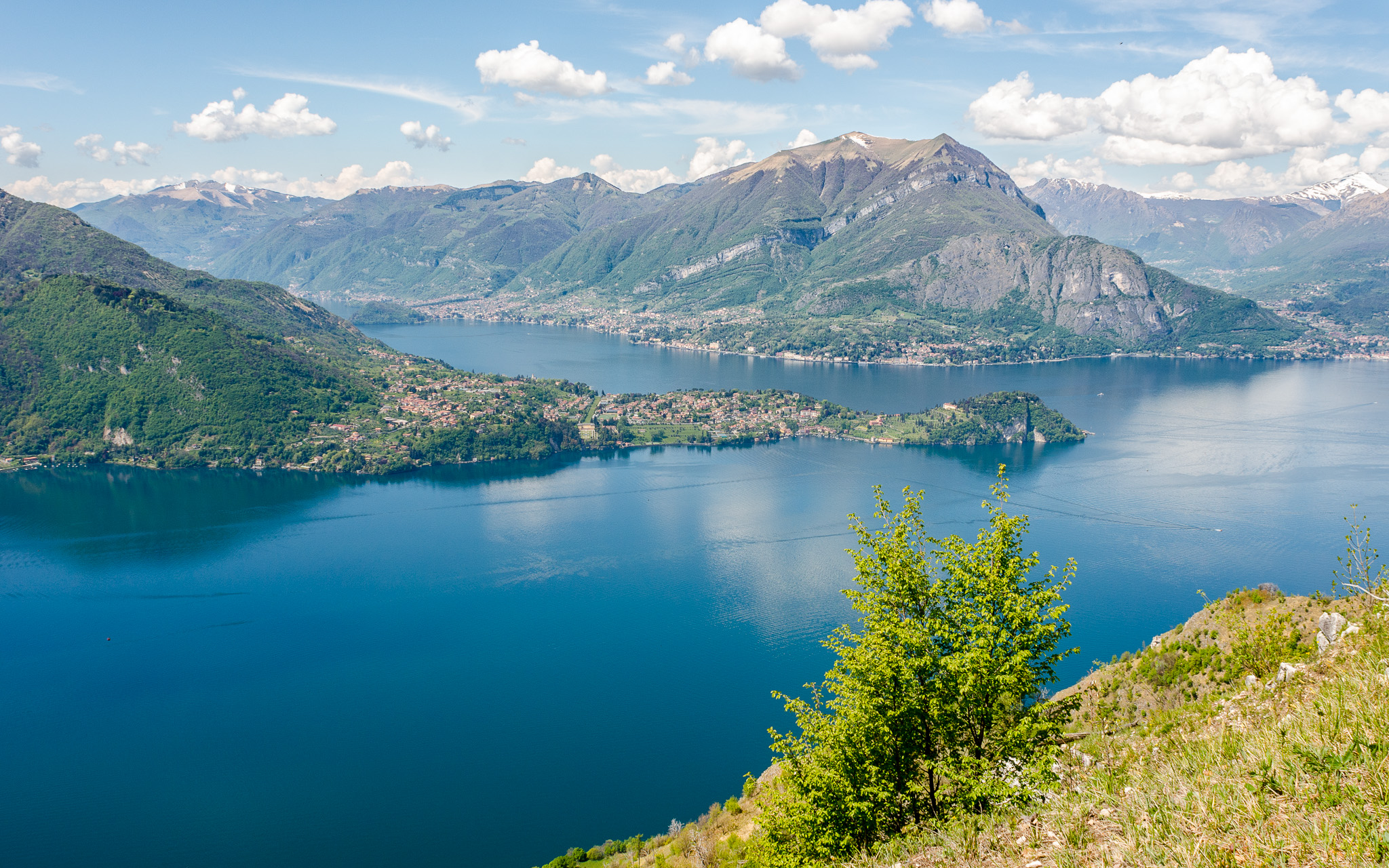
The last two episodes were primarily filmed in the Val d'Orcia region of Tuscany (top). Other key scenes in "Chiantishire" take place in Cortona (middle) and Lake Como (bottom).

"Chiantishire" was written by Succession creator and showrunner Jesse Armstrong and directed by Mark Mylod in his eleventh episode for the series. The episode's title is a nickname used for a region of Tuscany where many wealthy British people either live or spend their holidays.

Armstrong spoke of the decision to set the final two episodes of the season in Tuscany, remarking: "I don't know how much of a social signifier it is to Americans... but [Tuscany] has this particular flavor for the English upper class. Some call it Chiantishire in a slightly sickening way." He cited the work of E. M. Forster as a major inspiration for the series' depiction of Tuscany, wanting to experiment with the "visual fantasies" evoked by the 1985 film adaptation of Forster's novel A Room with a View. Filming in Italy for the series was said to be a longtime ambition of Armstrong's: executive producer Scott Ferguson remarked, "Quite honestly, I think every season Jesse has wanted to go to Italy. He also wanted a yacht the first season. So last season we got the yacht, (Note: For the episode "This Is Not for Tears".) and Italy is the second white whale."

=== Filming ===
The series filmed on location in Italy from June to August 2021, primarily in the Tuscan region of Val d'Orcia: for "Chiantishire", the villa La Foce served as the estate where Caroline's wedding guests stay, while the villa Buonriposo was used as Kendall's vacation home – where both his conversation with Logan as well as the episode's ending were shot. The scene where Shiv and Tom discuss childbirth was filmed at the village of Bagno Vignoni on the production's first day in Tuscany; Armstrong characterized the scene as a "successor" to the scene where Tom admits his dissatisfaction with his marriage to Shiv in the season 2 finale "This Is Not for Tears". Additionally, Shiv and Caroline's conversation during the latter's bachelorette party was filmed in the town of Cortona, located in the province of Arezzo.

Outside of Tuscany, the production filmed on location in Milan, where Waystar meets with bankers to discuss the GoJo acquisition, while Villa La Cassinella in Lake Como served as Lukas Matsson's vacation home, standing in for Lake Maggiore. The latter location was used for both "Chiantishire" and the season finale, "All the Bells Say".

== Reception ==
=== Ratings ===
Upon airing, the episode was watched by 0.613 million viewers, with an 18-49 rating of 0.12.

=== Critical reception ===
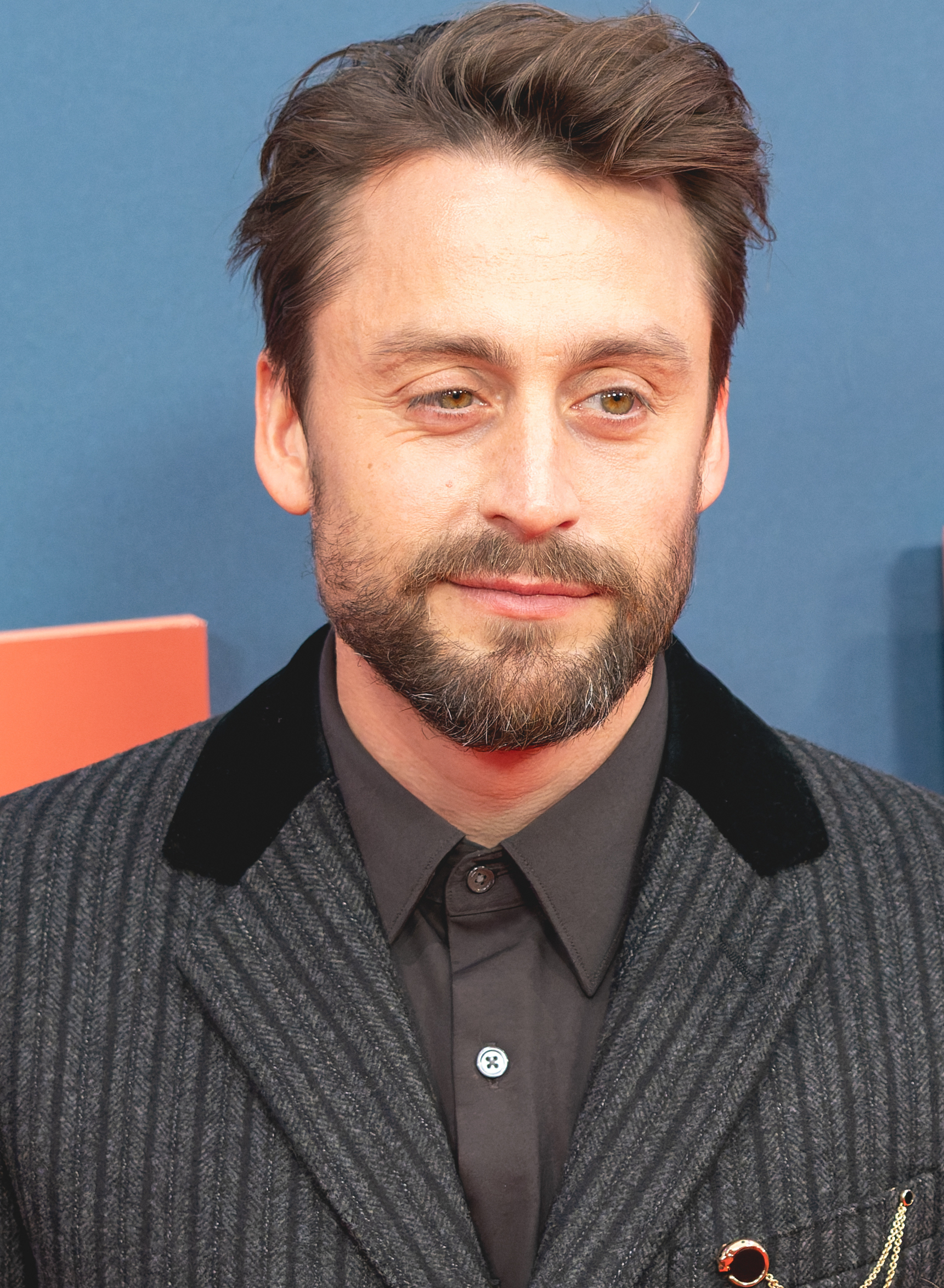
Critics praised Kieran Culkin's performance in the episode.

"Chiantishire" received widespread critical acclaim, with reviewers praising Armstrong's writing, Mylod's direction, and the episode's performances and emotional stakes. Roxana Hadadi of The A.V. Club gave the episode an A, describing it as "a true symphony of horrendous family dynamics, poisonous ambition, and people using and abusing each other over and over and over." Hadadi particularly praised the economy of Armstrong's script, writing, "you could argue any of these interactions was the most important to understanding where these characters are now and where they're going next." Michael Hogan of The Guardian felt the episode was the series' "most horrifying" to date, praising the performances of both Harriet Walter – as "delightfully bitchy" – and Kieran Culkin, for depicting Roman's "cocky bravado [fall] away to reveal the little boy beneath."

Noel Murray of The New York Times praised the "intense and emotional" dinner meeting between Kendall and Logan, and felt the episode illustrated how Logan's "combination of greed, envy and paranoia has been passed on to his children." Ben Travers of IndieWire was slightly less positive: he praised Culkin's performance during the episode's comedic climax, writing that the actor's "burrowing-under-the-table mortification makes for an indelible image," but criticized the episode's pace for constraining too many narrative developments into a short timeframe. He wrote: "At 64 minutes, 'Chiantishire' is bulkier than your typically tight Succession entry. [...] It lumbers a bit, as it moves between emotionally weighty back-and-forths. In another season, any of the bombs being dropped may have been given a little more space to detonate."

Alan Sepinwall of Rolling Stone wrote that the episode "crackles with tragicomic energy, featuring some of the funniest and saddest moments of the whole season." Sepinwall also singled out the scene between Logan and Kendall for praise, describing it as "on another level from everything else in the hour" and "one of the best [moments] of the whole series." He likened the episode overall to "a dry run for a version of Succession in which Kendall is no longer around." Philippa Snow of The Independent gave the episode 5 out of 5 stars, calling it "delightfully peculiar" and suggesting that its heightened pace and location choices would satisfy viewers who felt that earlier episodes in the season "have felt circular or been confined to the boardroom." Similarly, Sophie Gilbert of The Atlantic, who had previously criticized the first seven episodes of the season for feeling "stuck" and lacking dramatic stakes, wrote that the episode "finally [...] gave some texture to the characters after seven-plus hours of insults, sniping, marital froideur, and dick jokes." She concluded her review by writing, "'Chiantishire' was Succession at its best: savage, brutal, bleak."

=== Accolades ===
"Chiantishire" was nominated for four Primetime Emmy Awards at the 74th ceremony: Outstanding Supporting Actress in a Drama Series for Sarah Snook's performance, Outstanding Guest Actress in a Drama Series for Harriet Walter's performance, Outstanding Music Composition for a Series (Original Dramatic Score), and Outstanding Single-Camera Picture Editing for a Drama Series.
