= Succession season 3 =

Season of television series

Succession
- Season 3
- Promotional poster
- Showrunner: Jesse Armstrong
- Starring: Nicholas Braun; Brian Cox; Kieran Culkin; Dagmara Domińczyk; Peter Friedman; Justine Lupe; Matthew Macfadyen; David Rasche; Alan Ruck; J. Smith-Cameron; Sarah Snook; Fisher Stevens; Jeremy Strong
- No. of episodes: 9

Release
- Original network: HBO
- Original release: October 17 – December 12, 2021

Season chronology
- ← Previous; Season 2 Next → Season 4

The third season of the American satirical comedy-drama television series Succession premiered on HBO on October 17, 2021. Series creator Jesse Armstrong serves as the showrunner for the season. The series centers on the Roy family, the owners of global media and entertainment conglomerate Waystar RoyCo, and their fight for control of the company amidst uncertainty about the health of the family's patriarch.

The season features an ensemble cast of Nicholas Braun, Brian Cox, Kieran Culkin, Dagmara Domińczyk, Peter Friedman, Matthew Macfadyen, Alan Ruck, J. Smith-Cameron, Sarah Snook and Jeremy Strong, who all return from the previous season, with Hiam Abbass and Arian Moayed only returning in a recurring capacity. Justine Lupe, David Rasche and Fisher Stevens were promoted to the main cast for the season after featuring in recurring roles in the previous season.

In August 2019, HBO renewed Succession for a third season, which had begun filming by December 2020 in New York City. In June 2021, filming for the final two episodes took place in Tuscany. The season consists of nine episodes, a decrease from the previous season, which had ten, and the lowest episode count in the series. The season received critical acclaim. It was nominated for 25 Primetime Emmy Awards, and received four wins, including Outstanding Drama Series, Outstanding Supporting Actor in a Drama Series for Macfadyen, and Outstanding Writing for a Drama Series for Armstrong. The season broke the record for the most acting nominations in a single year, with 14.

== Cast and characters ==
=== Main ===
- Nicholas Braun as Greg Hirsch
- Brian Cox as Logan Roy
- Kieran Culkin as Roman Roy
- Dagmara Domińczyk as Karolina Novotney
- Peter Friedman as Frank Vernon
- Justine Lupe as Willa Ferreyra
- Matthew Macfadyen as Tom Wambsgans
- David Rasche as Karl Muller
- Alan Ruck as Connor Roy
- J. Smith-Cameron as Gerri Kellman
- Sarah Snook as Siobhan "Shiv" Roy
- Fisher Stevens as Hugo Baker
- Jeremy Strong as Kendall Roy

=== Recurring ===
- Hiam Abbass as Marcia Roy (Note: Credited as guest starring in the opening titles, unlike other guest stars.)
- Natalie Gold as Rava Roy
- Arian Moayed as Stewy Hosseini
- Alexander Skarsgård as Lukas Matsson
- Swayam Bhatia as Sophie Roy
- Quentin Morales as Iverson Roy
- Larry Pine as Sandy Furness
- Zack Robidas as Mark Ravenhead
- James Cromwell as Ewan Roy
- Harriet Walter as Lady Caroline Collingwood
- Scott Nicholson as Colin Stiles
- Patch Darragh as Ray
- Annabelle Dexter-Jones as Naomi Pierce
- Zoe Winters as Kerry Castellabate
- Sanaa Lathan as Lisa Arthur
- Linda Emond as Michelle-Anne Vanderhoven
- Juliana Canfield as Jess Jordan
- Jihae as Berry Schneider
- Dasha Nekrasova as Comfry Pellits
- Jordan Lage as Keith Zigler
- Hope Davis as Sandi Furness
- KeiLyn Durrel Jones as Remi
- Pip Torrens as Peter Munion

=== Guest ===
- Ashley Zukerman as Nate Sofrelli
- Jeannie Berlin as Cyd Peach
- Mark Linn-Baker as Maxim Pierce
- Justin Kirk as Jeryd Mencken
- Brian Hotaling as Mark Rosenstock

== Episodes ==
No. overall	No. in season	Title	Directed by	Written by	Original release date	U.S. viewers (millions)
21	1	"Secession"	Mark Mylod	Jesse Armstrong	October 17, 2021	0.564
Picking up immediately after Kendall's press conference, Logan decides to split his inner circle into two teams: he, Tom, Karl, Frank and Hugo station themselves in Sarajevo to avoid being extradited to the U.S., while Roman, Gerri and Shiv are sent back to New York. Logan informs his team that he intends to temporarily step back as CEO; the family and company management debate who should take his place as a figurehead. Kendall, meanwhile, sets up a temporary base of operations at Rava's apartment, and hires two PR consultants to help steward his public image. He unsuccessfully attempts to sway more of Waystar's senior cadre to his side. Shiv attempts to acquire representation for Waystar from Lisa Arthur, a high-profile New York attorney and personal friend, but realizes Kendall has already hired her. In light of Shiv's perceived failure, Gerri is named interim CEO.
22	2	"Mass in Time of War"	Mark Mylod	Jesse Armstrong	October 24, 2021	0.520
Shiv, Roman, and Connor covertly meet with Kendall, who refuses to compromise and attempts to persuade his siblings to join him. However, the discussion falls apart when Kendall declares that he will be CEO under their new arrangement. Seeing no personal benefit from siding with Kendall, the three siblings ultimately decide to remain aligned with Logan. Kendall additionally meets with Stewy and Sandi Furness (Sandy's daughter) to propose a partnership ahead of the company's shareholder meeting, but they remain skeptical. Greg obtains legal representation from Ewan's attorney. Logan has Marcia flown in to Sarajevo after his legal team advises that the two publicly appear reconciled. Marcia, disgruntled over Logan's infidelity, demands several assurances from the company to ensure her cooperation. Logan returns to New York and names Shiv President of Domestic Operations at Waystar, assuring her she is under Gerri's protection.
23	3	"The Disruption"	Cathy Yan	Ted Cohen & Georgia Pritchett	October 31, 2021	0.405
Both Kendall and Logan take steps to boost their respective public profiles. Logan refuses to cooperate with the Department of Justice's impending investigation, and attempts to pressure White House aide Michelle-Anne Vanderhoven into granting him favors from the President. Tom offers to take the fall by allowing himself to be incarcerated. Kendall sabotages Shiv's speech at a company town hall intended to allay employee grievances by having his assistants blast Nirvana's "Rape Me" from a speaker; an irate Shiv retaliates by publishing an open letter questioning Kendall's mental state, invoking his addiction issues and poor relationship with his children. Kendall prepares to make an appearance on a late-night comedy show that has been disparaging him, but backs out at the last minute after Shiv's letter goes online, deeply shaken by its contents. The FBI raid Waystar's offices, forcing Logan to cooperate.
24	4	"Lion in the Meadow"	Shari Springer Berman & Robert Pulcini	Jon Brown	November 7, 2021	0.484
On Logan's orders, Shiv gets ATN to cover the White House more critically, in hopes of pressuring the President into curtailing the DOJ investigation. However, she finds that she is receiving little respect or support either from within the company or from Logan. Tom begins to unravel over his growing fear of going to prison. Greg informs him he has signed a joint defense agreement with Waystar after meeting with Logan. Shareholder Josh Aaronson requests a meeting with Logan and Kendall, worried that their conflict will endanger his investment, and leads them on a walk around his private island to hear each side's arguments. However, Kendall and Logan fail to present a united front, and Logan suffers from exhaustion on the walk back to Josh's mansion, refusing help until he nearly collapses. Kendall is later informed that Josh has lost confidence in Waystar's current leadership, and witnesses him meeting with Stewy.
25	5	"Retired Janitors of Idaho"	Kevin Bray	Tony Roche & Susan Soon He Stanton	November 14, 2021	0.584
At the Waystar RoyCo annual shareholder meeting, both Kendall and Logan's factions attempt to broker a settlement with Stewy and Sandi (largely negotiating on behalf of her ailing father), realizing that going to a vote would almost certainly deprive the Roys of their majority stake in the company. Logan, who is suffering from a urinary tract infection, initially refuses Sandy's terms, but becomes increasingly incoherent, forcing the other children and senior management to negotiate on his behalf. The vote is stalled while Shiv and Sandi manage to reach a deal offering either side an additional board seat; the two sides agree on the terms without waiting for an incapacitated Logan to approve. Ewan decides to donate his entire estate to Greenpeace, leaving Greg with no inheritance. The President calls the Roys to announce that he will not be seeking a second term amid the blowback from ATN's attacks, jeopardizing Waystar's political survival.
26	6	"What It Takes"	Andrij Parekh	Will Tracy	November 21, 2021	0.525
Kendall's testimony to the DOJ regarding the cruises scandal goes poorly, and Lisa warns that the documents he has retrieved are insufficient legal ammunition against Waystar. An unsatisfied Kendall dispenses with Lisa's services and hires new attorneys. Meanwhile, the rest of the Roys travel to Richmond, Virginia to attend the Future Freedom Summit, a conservative political fundraiser, to pick a new presidential candidate in the upcoming election. While there, Roman learns that his mother is getting married in Tuscany to British CEO Peter Munion. Kendall arrives in Virginia and privately meets with Tom in an attempt to sway him to his side, but Tom refuses, believing Kendall will once again lose to his father. Among the presidential candidates, Roman takes a liking to Jeryd Mencken, a controversial figure with fascist leanings, who he believes will significantly boost ATN's ratings. Logan decides to back Mencken despite Shiv's protests.
27	7	"Too Much Birthday"	Lorene Scafaria	Georgia Pritchett & Tony Roche	November 28, 2021	0.645
The company receives word that the DOJ investigation is weakening and will likely end in a settlement. Tom is deeply relieved to be avoiding prison time. Logan, who has been working to acquire streaming giant GoJo, learns that its CEO, Lukas Matsson, declined to meet him personally. Shiv and Roman attend Kendall's lavish 40th birthday party to negotiate with Matsson, who is in attendance. Roman delivers his and Logan's gift to Kendall: an offer to buy out his shares in Waystar for $2 billion. Shiv is angered when she learns she has been excluded as a beneficiary. Roman meets with Matsson alone and proposes that Waystar buy GoJo without Matsson ever having to report directly to Logan; Matsson expresses guarded interest. Kendall, feeling hurt by the buyout offer and embarrassed with the hollow excess of the party, has an emotional breakdown while searching for his children's gift and has Naomi take him home.
28	8	"Chiantishire"	Mark Mylod	Jesse Armstrong	December 5, 2021	0.613
The Roys travel to Tuscany for Caroline's wedding. Kendall demands a sit-down with Logan over dinner, where he requests taking the $2 billion buyout to permanently uncouple himself from his "evil" father, but Logan refuses. Caroline admits to Shiv she never wanted children and encourages Shiv not to bear one of her own; out of spite, Shiv asks to have a child with Tom, but tells him before sex that she does not love him, later passing it off as foreplay. GoJo's stock price soars after Matsson sends a tweet suggesting he has received major financing; Roman goes to meet him and discovers that Matsson is interested in a merger of equals with Waystar rather than an acquisition. Logan accepts the renewed terms, but Waystar's meeting with GoJo's bankers is derailed when Roman mistakenly sends a photo of his penis to Logan instead of Gerri. Kendall drunkenly floats facedown in his pool, and slowly lets his head sink into the water.
29	9	"All the Bells Say"	Mark Mylod	Jesse Armstrong	December 12, 2021	0.634
Kendall is saved from drowning in his pool. GoJo's market capitalization overtakes Waystar's; Logan and Roman go to meet Matsson, who proposes that GoJo acquire Waystar with him as CEO while Logan exits with a settlement. Roman is sent back to attend Caroline's wedding, where he and Shiv discover that Logan has decided to sell the company without their input, jeopardizing the children's chances of succeeding him. They tell Kendall, who breaks down and tearfully admits his involvement in Doddy's death, only to be met with support from them to his surprise. The three recall a clause in Logan and Caroline's divorce settlement granting the children veto power over any change in company control, and decide to face their father together. On the way, Shiv informs Tom, who cryptically offers Greg a chance at significant ascension within the company. Upon being confronted by his children, Logan informs them that he and Caroline have renegotiated their divorce agreement, effectively depriving the children of company control. Tom is revealed to have tipped off Logan about the Roy siblings’ revolt.

== Production ==
=== Development ===
On August 20, 2019, following the premiere of the second season, HBO renewed Succession for a third season. The season consists of nine episodes, a decrease from the previous season. By November, co-writer Lucy Prebble confirmed that the writing process for the season was underway. The third season was originally set to begin filming in April 2020 and air in August 2020. On March 28, 2020, HBO announced the third season's production was delayed indefinitely due to the COVID-19 pandemic. The scripts for the season had all been written before the pandemic and Armstrong decided that the finished scripts wouldn't be rewritten to address the current pandemic. Armstrong did not wish to address the pandemic in season 3 as, according to Sarah Snook, "none of the world's really wealthy people were going to be affected by the pandemic". Showrunner Jesse Armstrong said that, as with previous seasons, the season was influenced by the Trump presidency but also felt that the show remains relevant in the post-Trump era as the United States is still undergoing "a certain amount of post-traumatic stress". He explained that despite the Trump presidency ending, "we're not really past that era until normal, democratic politics where people accept the outcomes of elections resumes".

=== Casting ===
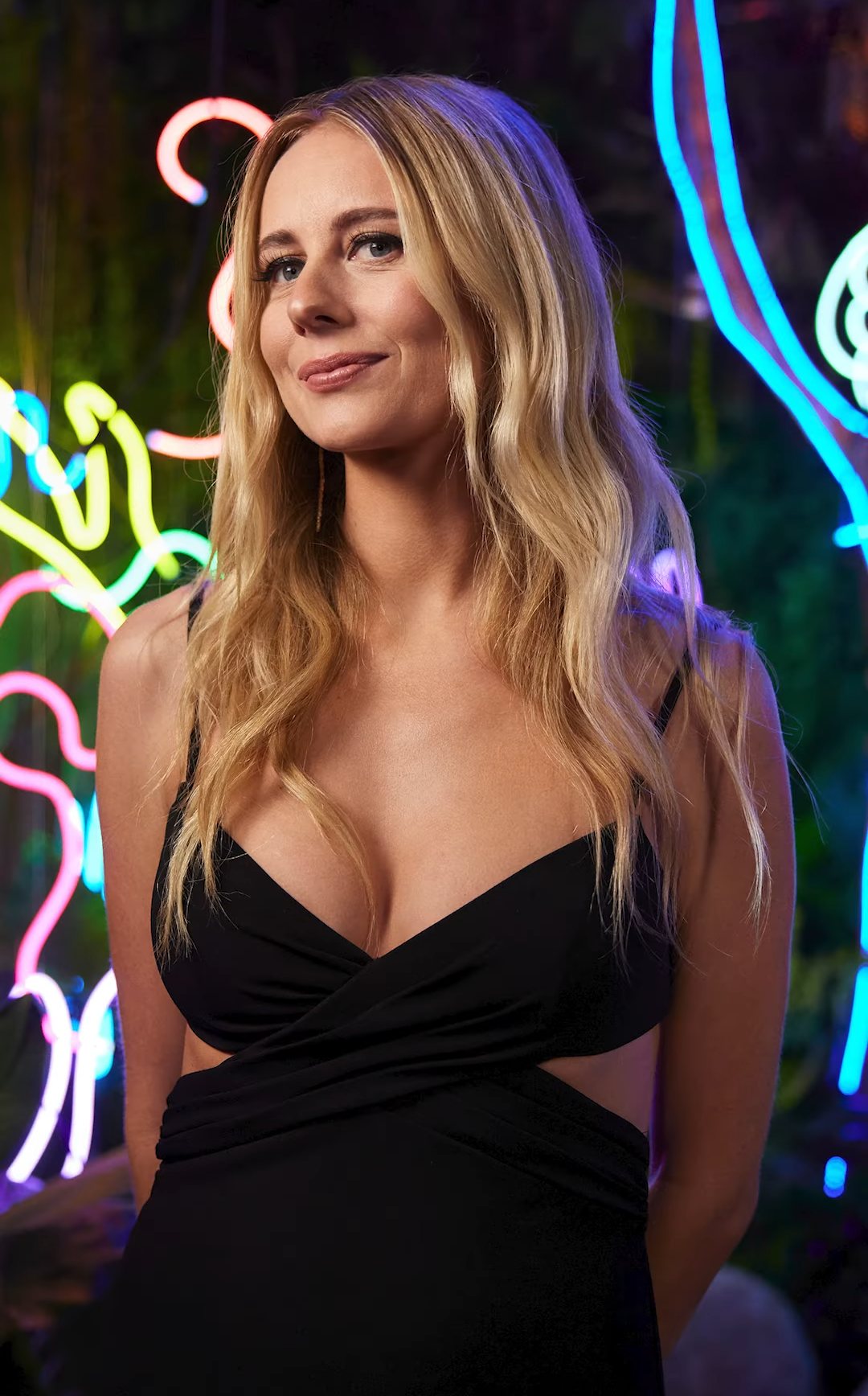
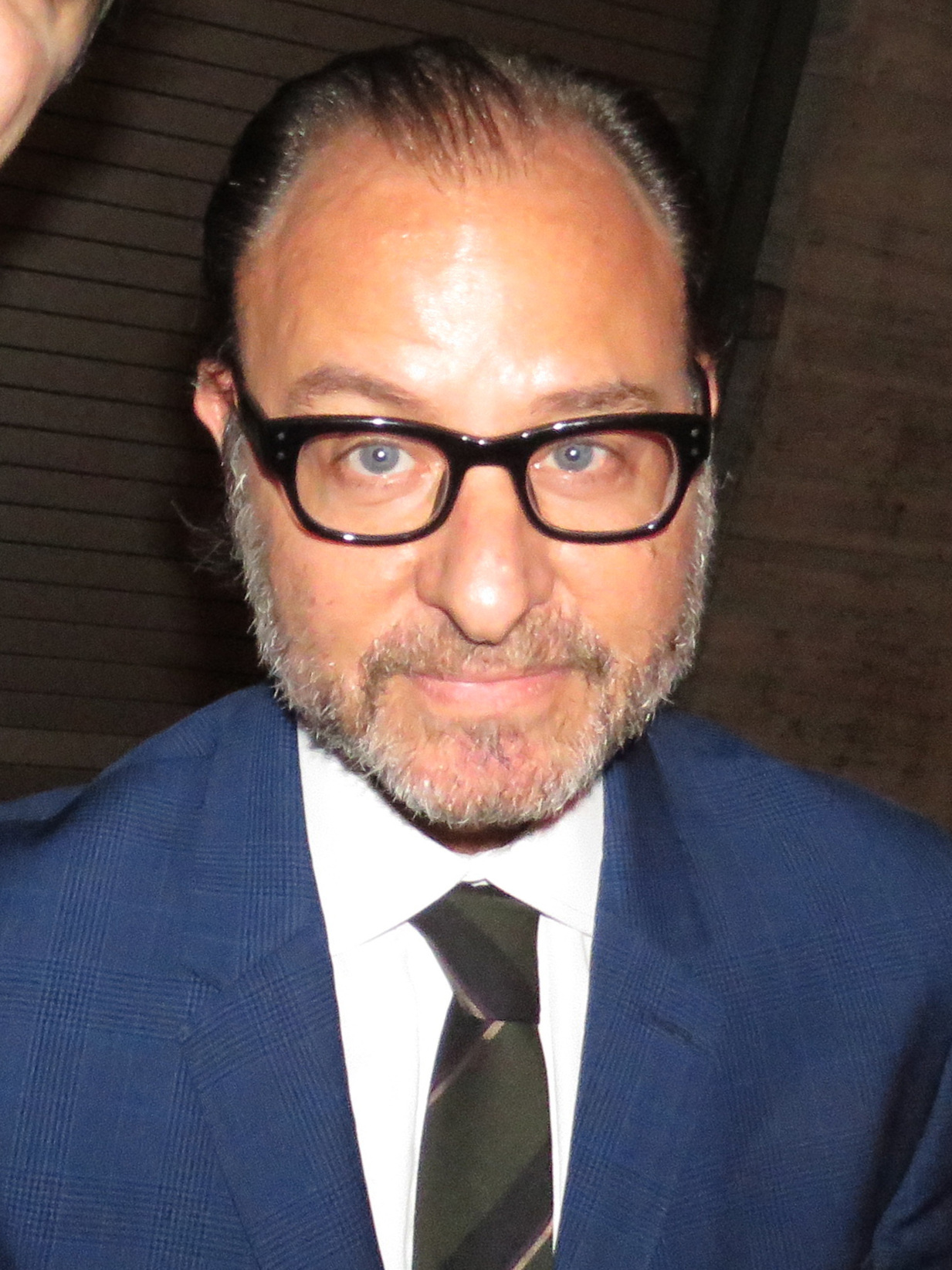
Justine Lupe and Fisher Stevens were promoted to the main cast for the season.

All main cast members return from the previous season, excluding Rob Yang, with Hiam Abbass and Arian Moayed only appears in a recurring capacity. Justine Lupe, David Rasche and Fisher Stevens, who previously starred in recurring roles, were promoted to the main cast for the season. Juliana Canfield's Jess Jordan is given significantly more screen time in season 3 and Canfield is promoted in the credits from co-starring to a recurring guest starring role. Jeremy Strong requested Kendall's on-screen assistant to appear in more scenes than originally planned in the script. Strong's commitment to method acting made him embody Kendall where he would make requests for his assistant Jess. In previous seasons, Canfield would appear in some episodes in the background in a non-speaking capacity. Jeannie Berlin's role as Cyd Peach is reduced from a 4-episode recurring role in season 2 to a guest role in the season 3 episode "Retired Janitors of Idaho". Natalie Gold returns after an absence from season 2 as Rava in a recurring guest role. Cast members from season 2 that didn't return for season 3 include Eric Bogosian, Caitlin FitzGerald, Danny Huston, Holly Hunter, Cherry Jones and Babak Tafti.

In January 2021, it was announced Sanaa Lathan, Linda Emond and Jihae had joined the cast of the series in recurring roles in the third season. In February 2021, it was reported that Hope Davis was cast in a recurring role in the third season. In March 2021, Dasha Nekrasova was reported to have a recurring role in the third season. In May 2021, Alexander Skarsgård was cast in a recurring role while Adrien Brody was cast to guest star for the third season. In August 2021, it was announced Ella Rumpf would guest star in the third season.

=== Filming ===
Principal photography for Succession's third season was originally scheduled to begin in April 2020 but was postponed by HBO on March 27, 2020 due to the COVID-19 pandemic. Succession creator Jesse Armstrong said in August 2020 that they were discussing "starting shooting in New York before Christmas". In early November 2020, star Alan Ruck announced that filming would begin in mid-November in New York City. The season had begun filming in New York as of December 2020. When season 3 began filming, on-set COVID-19 safety protocols were used such as filming scenes with smaller groups of actors while any larger office scenes featuring more extras were delayed until the late 2020 and early 2021 spike in COVID-19 cases had subsided. Filming locations in the city included the Woolworth Building in Tribeca and a number of hotels including the Marriott Marquis in Times Square and the Plaza Hotel on Fifth Avenue. Production also returned to the Hamptons, at locations including Montauk and Wainscott. In May 2021, additional filming for the season took place in Richmond, Virginia, primarily at the Jefferson Hotel. Episode 7, "Too Much Birthday" was filmed at The Shed in New York's Hudson Yards which served as the location of Kendall Roy's 40th birthday celebration.

In June 2021, filming moved to Italy for the final two episodes "Chiantishire" and "All the Bells Say", primarily taking place in the Val d'Orcia region of Tuscany. The Villa Cetinale in Tuscany, a 17th century Roman Baroque-style mansion, served as the venue for the wedding in the season's final two episodes in addition to the La Foce estate. Succession showrunner Jesse Armstrong said that the decision to set the final two episodes in Tuscany was an intentional acknowledgment of the Roy family's extreme wealth. Outside of Tuscany, "Chiantshire" filmed on location in Milan where Waystar meets with bankers to discuss the GoJo acquisition. Additional filming took place in other nearby comuni in the province of Siena – including Pienza, Montalcino and Chianciano Terme – as well as in Cortona, Lake Como, Milan, and Florence (the lattermost of which was used for establishing shots in the opening episodes).

== Music ==
Succession: Season 3 (HBO Original Series Soundtrack)

Soundtrack album by Nicholas Britell
- Released: April 29, 2022
- Genres: Classical; hip hop
- Length: 44:16
- Label: Republic Records

Succession: Season 3 (HBO Original Series Soundtrack) is the soundtrack to the third season of the television series, released on April 29, 2022 by Republic Records.

No.	Title	Length
1.	"Furioso in F Minor"	1:51
2.	"Milan – Promenade"	1:03
3.	"Rigaudon"	2:09
4.	"Andante Agitato – End Credits – "The Raid""	4:09
5.	""Sorry, Pinky""	1:24
6.	"Satyricon – Instrumental"	1:29
7.	""Tuscany" Suite for Piano and Orchestra"	2:03
8.	"Sinfonietta in A Minor – Strings Variation – "The Photo""	1:08
9.	"Impromptu No. 1 in C Minor for Piano"	5:33
10.	"Scherzo in F Minor – Strings"	0:45
11.	"Doloroso – Strings"	2:26
12.	"Serenata – "Il Viaggio""	1:21
13.	""Tuscany" Suite for Piano and Bass"	2:01
14.	"Impromptu No. 2 for Piano and Orchestra"	2:11
15.	"Scherzo in F Minor – Piano and Bass"	0:56
16.	"Ricercare – Strings and Voices – Bonus Track"	1:18
17.	"Nocturne – Piano and Strings"	1:22
18.	"Impromptu No. 1 for Strings – End Credits – "Chiantishire""	3:02
19.	"Dolce Pianos and Strings – "Il Viaggio""	1:21
20.	"Andante Moderato – End Credits – "Amen""	2:50
21.	"Honesty" (feat. Kendall Roy)	3:54
Total length:		44:16

== Release ==
The season premiered on HBO on October 17, 2021, with episodes released weekly until the finale on December 12, 2021.

=== Home media ===
HBO released the third season on DVD on May 17, 2022.

== Reception ==
=== Audience viewership ===
The third season premiered to 1.4 million viewers across various platforms and ended with 1.7 million viewers across all viewing platforms, a record high for the series.

=== Critical response ===
The third season received critical acclaim. On the review aggregator website Rotten Tomatoes, the season holds a 97% approval rating with an average rating of 9.3/10, based on 146 reviews. The website's critical consensus reads, "Fans already buying what Succession is selling will be pleasantly surprised to find its third season in crackling form – even if it gets a little too real from time to time." On Metacritic, the season has a weighted average score of 92 out of 100, based on 31 critics, indicating "universal acclaim".

=== Accolades ===
Its third season received a leading 25 nominations with four wins at the 74th Primetime Emmy Awards; including Outstanding Drama Series, Matthew Macfadyen for Outstanding Supporting Actor in a Drama Series, and Jesse Armstrong for Outstanding Writing for a Drama Series (for the episode "All the Bells Say"). Brian Cox, Jeremy Strong, Kieran Culkin, Nicholas Braun, Sarah Snook, James Cromwell, and Harriet Walter all received repeat nominations, while J. Smith-Cameron, Adrien Brody, Arian Moayed, Alexander Skarsgård, Hope Davis, and Sanaa Lathan all received acting nominations as well. The series also received three nominations for Outstanding Directing for a Drama Series. The season broke the record for the most acting nominations in a single year, with 14.
