= 74th Directors Guild of America Awards =

- Date: March 12, 2022
- Location: The Beverly Hilton, Beverly Hills, California
- Country: United States
- Presented by: Directors Guild of America
- Hosted by: Judd Apatow

Highlights
- Best Director Feature Film: The Power of the Dog – Jane Campion
- Best Director Documentary: Attica – Stanley Nelson Jr.
- Best Director First-Time Feature Film: The Lost Daughter – Maggie Gyllenhaal

The 74th Directors Guild of America Awards, honoring the outstanding directorial achievement in feature films, documentary, television and commercials of 2021, were presented on March 12, 2022, at the Beverly Hilton in Beverly Hills, California. The ceremony was hosted by Judd Apatow, who previously hosted the ceremonies in 2018 and 2020. The nominations for the television and documentary categories were announced on January 26, 2022, while the nominations for the feature film categories were announced on January 27, 2022.

== Winners and nominees ==
=== Film ===
Feature Film

Jane Campion – The Power of the Dog

- Paul Thomas Anderson – Licorice Pizza
- Kenneth Branagh – Belfast
- Steven Spielberg – West Side Story
- Denis Villeneuve – Dune
Documentaries

Stanley Nelson Jr. – Attica

- Jessica Kingdon – Ascension
- Raoul Peck – Exterminate All the Brutes
- Ahmir "Questlove" Thompson – Summer of Soul (...Or, When the Revolution Could Not Be Televised)
- Elizabeth Chai Vasarhelyi and Jimmy Chin – The Rescue
First-Time Feature Film

Maggie Gyllenhaal – The Lost Daughter

- Rebecca Hall – Passing
- Tatiana Huezo – Prayers for the Stolen
- Lin-Manuel Miranda – Tick, Tick... Boom!
- Michael Sarnoski – Pig
- Emma Seligman – Shiva Baby

=== Television ===
Drama Series

Mark Mylod – Succession for "All the Bells Say"

- Kevin Bray – Succession for "Retired Janitors of Idaho"
- Andrij Parekh – Succession for "What It Takes"
- Robert Pulcini and Shari Springer Berman – Succession for "Lion in the Meadow"
- Lorene Scafaria – Succession for "Too Much Birthday"
Comedy Series

Lucia Aniello – Hacks for "There Is No Line"

- MJ Delaney – Ted Lasso for "No Weddings and a Funeral"
- Erica Dunton – Ted Lasso for "Rainbow"
- Sam Jones – Ted Lasso for "Beard After Hours"
- Mike White – The White Lotus for "Mysterious Monkeys"
Movies for Television and Limited Series

Barry Jenkins – The Underground Railroad

- Barry Levinson – Dopesick for "First Bottle"
- Hiro Murai – Station Eleven for "Wheel of Fire"
- Danny Strong – Dopesick for "The People vs. Purdue Pharma"
- Craig Zobel – Mare of Easttown
Variety/Talk/News/Sports – Regularly Scheduled Programming

Don Roy King – Saturday Night Live for "Keegan-Michael Key/Olivia Rodrigo"

- Paul G. Casey – Real Time with Bill Maher for "#1935"
- Jim Hoskinson – The Late Show with Stephen Colbert for "#1105"
- David Paul Meyer – The Daily Show with Trevor Noah for "#26112"
- Paul Pennolino and Christopher Werner – Last Week Tonight with John Oliver for "#830"
Variety/Talk/News/Sports – Specials

Paul Dugdale – Adele One Night Only

- Ian Berger – The Daily Show with Trevor Noah Presents "Jordan Klepper Fingers the Pulse – Into the Magaverse"
- Bo Burnham – Bo Burnham: Inside
- Stan Lathan – Dave Chappelle: The Closer
- Glenn Weiss – The 43rd Annual Kennedy Center Honors
Reality Programs

Adam Vetri – Getaway Driver for "Electric Shock"

- Joseph Guidry – Full Bloom for "Final Floral Face Off"
- Patrick McManus – American Ninja Warrior for "1304: Qualifiers 4"
- Ramy Romany – Making the Cut for "Brand Statement"
- Ben Simms – Running Wild with Bear Grylls for "Gina Carano In The Dolomites"
Children's Programs

Smriti Mundhra – Through Our Eyes for "Shelter"

- James Bobin – The Mysterious Benedict Society for "A Bunch of Smart Orphans"
- Michael Lembeck – The J Team
- Phill Lewis – Head of the Class for "Three More Years"
- Jeff Wadlow – Are You Afraid of the Dark? for "The Tale of the Darkhouse"

=== Commercials ===
Commercials

Bradford Young – Channel 4's "Super. Human."

- Steve Ayson – Mattress Firm's "Anthem", and Miller Lite's "Award Speech" and "Networking"
- Kathryn Bigelow – Apple's "Hollywood In Your Pocket"
- Ian Pons Jewell – Apple's "ECG" and "Sleep", Squarespace's "Time", and Instacart's "Your Mom’s Short Ribs"
- Henry-Alex Rubin – Sandy Hook Promise's "Teenage Dream"

=== Lifetime Achievement in Feature Film ===
- Spike Lee

=== Frank Capra Achievement Award ===
- Joseph P. Reidy

=== Franklin J. Schaffner Achievement Award ===
- Garry W. Hood
