= Too Much Birthday =

- Succession episode
- Episode no.: Season 3 Episode 7
- Directed by: Lorene Scafaria
- Written by: Georgia Pritchett; Tony Roche
- Cinematography by: Christopher Norr
- Original air date: November 28, 2021
- Running time: 58 minutes

Guest appearances
- Alexander Skarsgård as Lukas Matsson; Natalie Gold as Rava Roy; Annabelle Dexter-Jones as Naomi Pierce; Scott Nicholson as Colin; Zoë Winters as Kerry; Jihae as Berry Schneider; Dasha Nekrasova as Comfry

Episode chronology
← Previous "What It Takes"	Next → "Chiantishire"
- Succession season 3

"Too Much Birthday" is the seventh episode of the third season of the American satirical comedy-drama television series Succession, and the 27th episode overall. It was written by Georgia Pritchett and Tony Roche and directed by Lorene Scafaria, and originally aired on HBO on November 28, 2021.

The episode primarily takes place at Kendall's extravagant 40th birthday party, where Shiv and Roman attempt to meet with the CEO of a streaming giant Waystar is attempting to acquire. The episode introduces Alexander Skarsgård in a recurring role as tech mogul Lukas Matsson; he would appear every episode for the rest of season three, and join the main cast for the fourth and final season.

"Too Much Birthday" was nominated for three Primetime Emmy Awards at the 74th ceremony, including for Outstanding Directing for a Drama Series.

== Plot ==
Waystar's senior management learn that the Department of Justice investigation is weakening and will likely end in a settlement. Tom is immensely relieved to no longer be facing the threat of incarceration, destroying Greg’s office in the process; nonetheless, Logan discreetly tells him he will remember his offer to go to prison. Logan then pivots to his planned acquisition of streaming giant GoJo, but discovers that its founder and CEO Lukas Matsson has declined to meet with him personally. Shiv and Roman offer to meet with Matsson at Kendall's 40th birthday that night. Logan sends Roman along with a gift for Kendall.

Roman, Shiv, and Connor arrive at Kendall's extravagant party, teeming with high-profile guests and featuring "immersive theater" exhibits such as a large-scale replica of his mother's birth canal. Roman hands Kendall his "gift", which is simply a note from Logan reading "CASH OUT AND FUCK OFF", along with a proposal to buy out his shares in Waystar. Shiv is upset to learn that Roman is a beneficiary in the buyout agreement whereas she is not. Kendall is upset to learn that Shiv and Roman are only there to meet Matsson, and he bans them from entering the party's VIP zone—a giant replica of his childhood treehouse—where the asocial Matsson has sequestered himself.

Kendall encounters his ex-wife Rava at the party; tension develops when she tells him that Waystar has been sending men to harass her and the children, encouraged by Roman (but opposed by Shiv). Kendall is surprised when Rava says that his children have sent him a gift, and he becomes fixated on tracking it down in a pile of gifts from other guests. He becomes embarrassed by the party's lavish excess and backs out of a planned onstage performance.

Roman, meanwhile, forces his way into the treehouse to meet with Matsson about an acquisition of his company, the streaming service GoJo. Roman suggests that Matsson would never have to report directly to Logan—whom Matsson personally despises—and additionally offers to discontinue StarGo, Waystar's antiquated and poorly functioning streaming service. Matsson expresses interest and agrees to continue discussions later in the week. Roman treats the meeting as a success and mocks Shiv for being sidelined from the negotiations.

Greg works up the courage to ask Comfry out on a date, despite being forbidden by a spiteful Kendall. Comfry accepts, exasperated by Kendall's eccentric demands. Greg is elated, provoking resentment from a drug-addled Tom, who is not enjoying the party and remains unhappy despite avoiding prison. Kendall, anxiously searching for his children's gift with Naomi's help, breaks down crying and asks to go home. While leaving, he lashes out at his three siblings; a drunken Roman viciously mocks him and shoves him to the ground. Kendall returns to his apartment despondent, and Naomi comforts him.

== Production ==
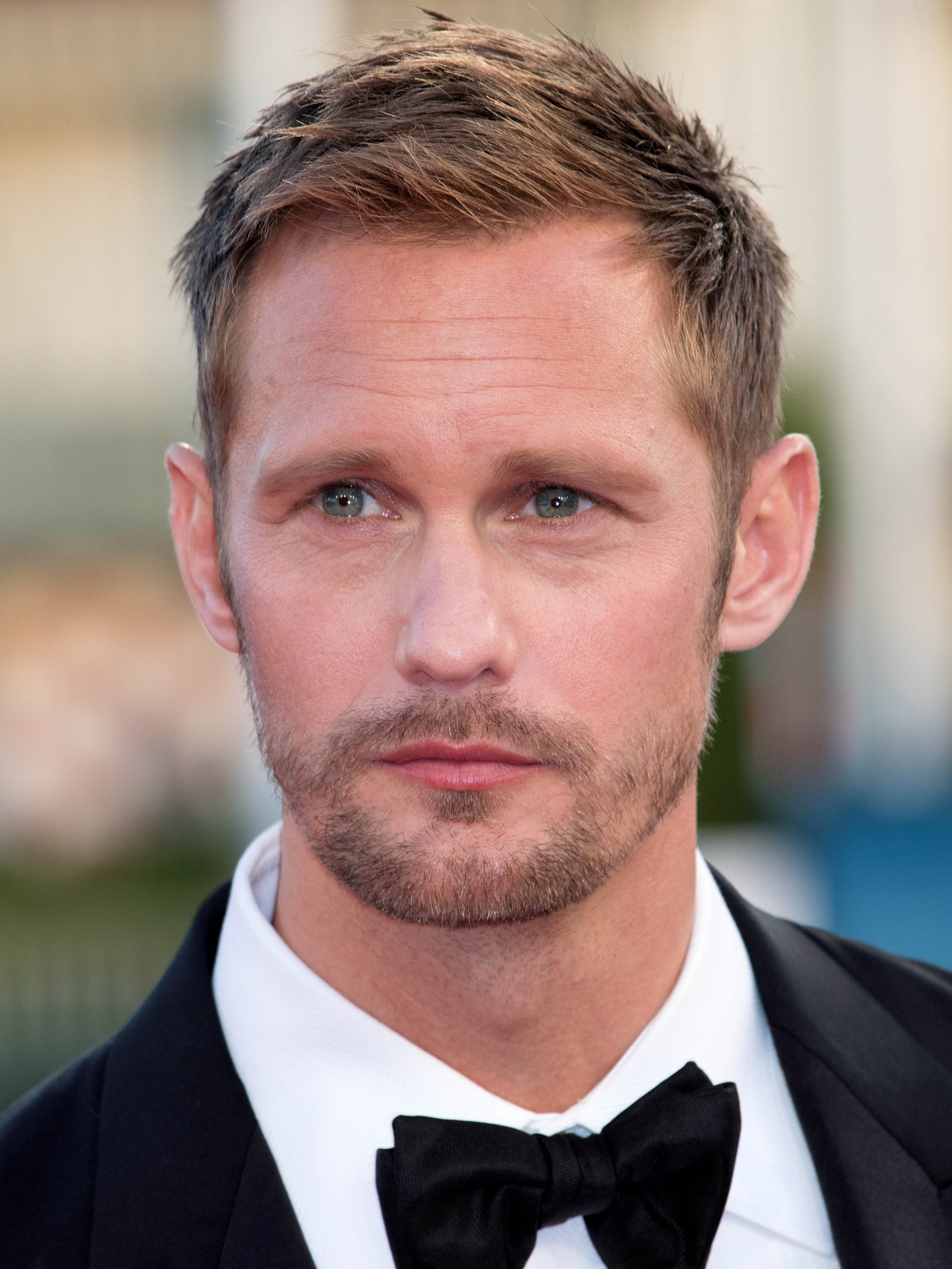
Alexander Skarsgård makes his first appearance as tech mogul Lukas Matsson in "Too Much Birthday".

"Too Much Birthday" was written by Georgia Pritchett and Tony Roche and directed by Lorene Scafaria, known for directing the film Hustlers (2019). According to series creator Jesse Armstrong, the episode derives its title from a Berenstain Bears book. The episode introduces Alexander Skarsgård in a recurring role as GoJo founder and CEO Lukas Matsson. The character, described as an "enigmatic sociopath," frequently drew comparisons to Elon Musk. Skarsgård recounted that the character was initially pitched as a two-episode role before being expanded upon; he confirmed that Musk as well as Spotify co-founder Daniel Ek were among the inspirations for the character.

The episode is centered on Kendall's 40th birthday party, a lavish event decorated with absurdist art exhibits evoking various aspects of Kendall's psyche. Actor Jeremy Strong described the party as "solipsistic," drawing inspiration from his own past performance in a play about the life of architect Frank Lloyd Wright. He elaborated: "it's about this idea of this man who built houses everywhere all over the world, but what he really wanted to create is a feeling of home and wasn't able to and that a house is not a home." Noel Murray of The New York Times felt the birthday party evoked the downfall of real-life companies such as WeWork and LuLaRoe, whose corporate events he described as "preposterously lavish and borderline cultish shindig[s], celebrating a business culture about to collapse under its founding genius."

=== Filming ===
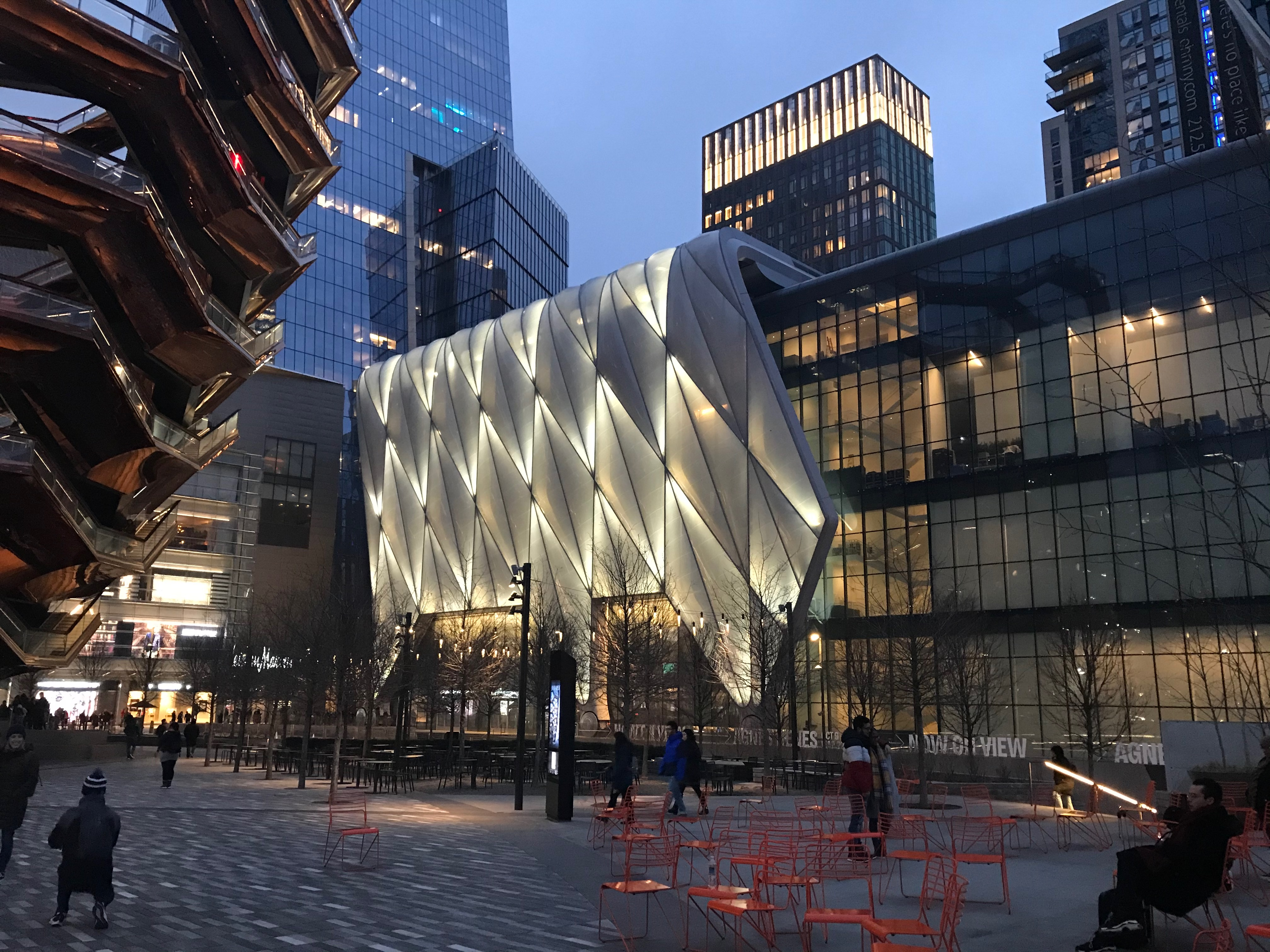
The Shed in New York's Hudson Yards was used as the location of Kendall's birthday party.

The Shed, a multi-use arts center in New York's Hudson Yards, was used as the venue for Kendall's birthday party. Production designer Stephen Carter recounted that the venue was chosen in part due to the ease of working around COVID-19 filming regulations, and in part because the Hudson Yards location was felt to suit Kendall's personality (the production also used 35 Hudson Yards for Kendall's apartment). Certain scenes, such as the dancefloor sequences and Kendall searching for his children's gift, were shot on location inside The Shed, while the various themed rooms at the party were built on a soundstage. Both director Scafaria and actor Strong offered significant input into the design of the party, with the former citing both the Burning Man festival and Kanye West's 2016 tour for his album The Life of Pablo as inspirations. Strong likened the party to a psychological "hall of mirrors."

The party set featured a number of art installations, including large-scale replicas of Kendall's childhood treehouse and his mother's birth canal, a room filled with faux news headlines lampooning the Roy siblings, a recreation of the Waystar offices filled with LED screens projecting images of fire, and a forest-themed "compliment tunnel". For the treehouse, Carter cited the group Meow Wolf as an influence, stating that the primary challenge was finding "where the threshold was between the literal and non-literal." The production settled on an exterior modeled after a "theme park version" of a literal treehouse, while the interior was "much more clubby." Scafaria was intent on having the siblings' climactic confrontation happen inside the treehouse, describing the area as the "emotional anchor" of the party. The compliment tunnel, meanwhile, was described by Carter as a "saccharine, floral, drug nightmare" whose design was inspired by a Brooklyn restaurant decorated with "a lot of fake wisteria." Several other proposed designs, such as a replica of Kendall's childhood nursery, were ultimately cut from the episode, though the nursery set is briefly visible past the "birth canal" entrance.

After the episode's broadcast, HBO published an official playlist titled "Kendall's Birthday Mix," featuring 16 songs licensed for use as part of the episode's soundtrack. Not included in the playlist was Billy Joel's "Honesty", which Kendall sings during the episode's cold open while rehearsing for an onstage stunt that he later calls off. Strong's full cover of "Honesty" was later released as part of Nicholas Britell's score for season 3. Reviews compared the performance to Kendall's rap "L to the OG" in season 2's "Dundee", which HBO also released on streaming platforms.

== Reception ==
=== Ratings ===
Upon airing, the episode was watched by 0.645 million viewers, with an 18-49 rating of 0.12.

=== Critical reception ===
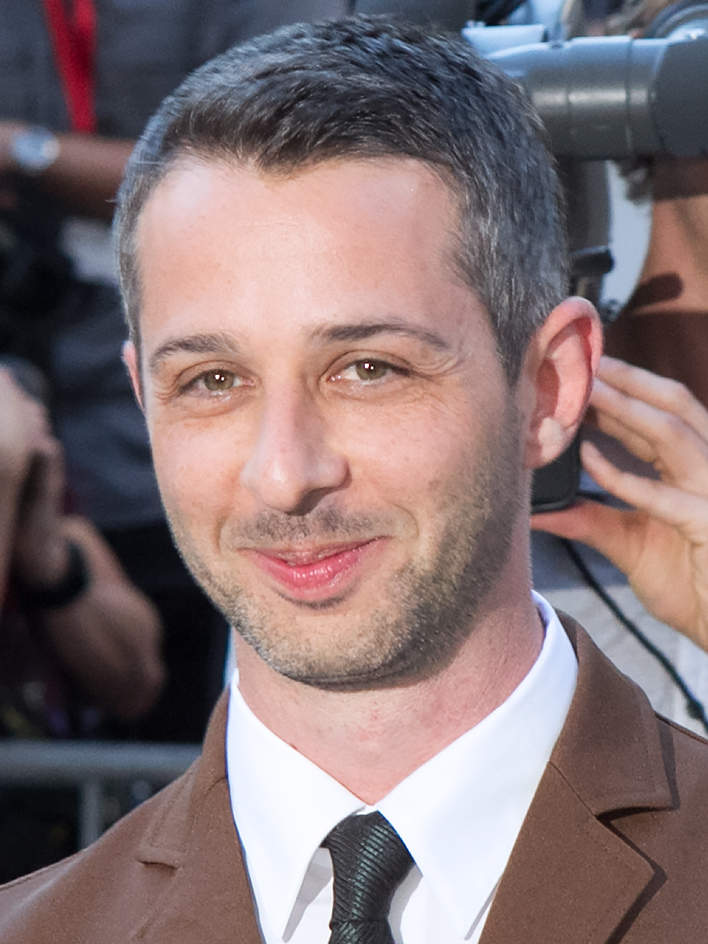
Jeremy Strong's performance in the episode was widely praised by critics.

"Too Much Birthday" received critical acclaim, with reviewers praising the episode's production design, script, direction, and Jeremy Strong's performance. Roxana Hadadi of The A.V. Club gave the episode an A, describing it as an "emotional battering ram" and praising Strong and the episode's writers for imbuing Kendall with "so many layers of woundedness and vulnerability and pompousness and greed." Ben Travers of IndieWire gave the episode an A−, calling it "a marvelous blend of maximized imagination and calculated character arcs." Travers singled out the production design of Kendall's birthday party for praise, suggesting that the episode "should earn Emmys for production designer Stephen H. Carter, art director Marci Mudd, and set decorator George DeTitta Jr. (if not Scafaria and the writers, as well)." Similarly, Noel Murray of The New York Times called the episode "a triumph of production design," particularly praising the replica of Kendall's childhood treehouse as a "conceptual masterstroke." Murray felt the party sequence was evocative of Citizen Kane, calling it "a grand illustration of the whole concept of 'hubris.'"

Alan Sepinwall of Rolling Stone described the episode as "a spectacular, bonkers, deeply sad, unforgettable hour," praising the party sequence for "walking a tragicomic knife's edge". However, Sepinwall did acknowledge criticisms that the series had become formulaic in its third season, writing, "on some level, it feels as if Succession itself is going in circles, revisiting the same players and conflicts again and again in tweaked configurations." Nonetheless, he felt that the episode "so ably demonstrate[d]" that "formula is not a creative death sentence," stating that it excelled "as both a character study of Kendall and a satire of the family's wealth at its most profligate."

Other critics also described the episode as an improvement over the rest of season 3: Shirley Li of The Atlantic also reiterated concerns that "at times the series has felt like it's spinning its thematic wheels", while praising "Too Much Birthday" for "depict[ing] its characters' joylessness as a domino effect: One slight begets another, then another, until Kendall's party feels like an inescapable labyrinth of gloom." Anita Singh of The Daily Telegraph called the episode "sublimely funny in parts, quietly devastating in others" and praised Strong's "brilliant" performance. Singh stated the episode "really was perfect" compared to those before, which she felt contained "too many scenes with the characters confined to Waystar Royco headquarters, talking about business deals."

=== Accolades ===
At the 74th Directors Guild of America Awards, Lorene Scafaria was nominated for the Directors Guild of America Award for Outstanding Directing – Drama Series for her work in the episode.

"Too Much Birthday" was nominated for three Primetime Emmy Awards at the 74th ceremony: Outstanding Directing for a Drama Series, Outstanding Production Design for a Narrative Contemporary Program (One Hour or More), and Outstanding Sound Mixing for a Comedy or Drama Series (One Hour). Jeremy Strong and Kieran Culkin submitted this episode to support their Outstanding Lead Actor in a Drama Series and Outstanding Supporting Actor in a Drama Series nominations, respectively.
