= Juliana Canfield =

American actress

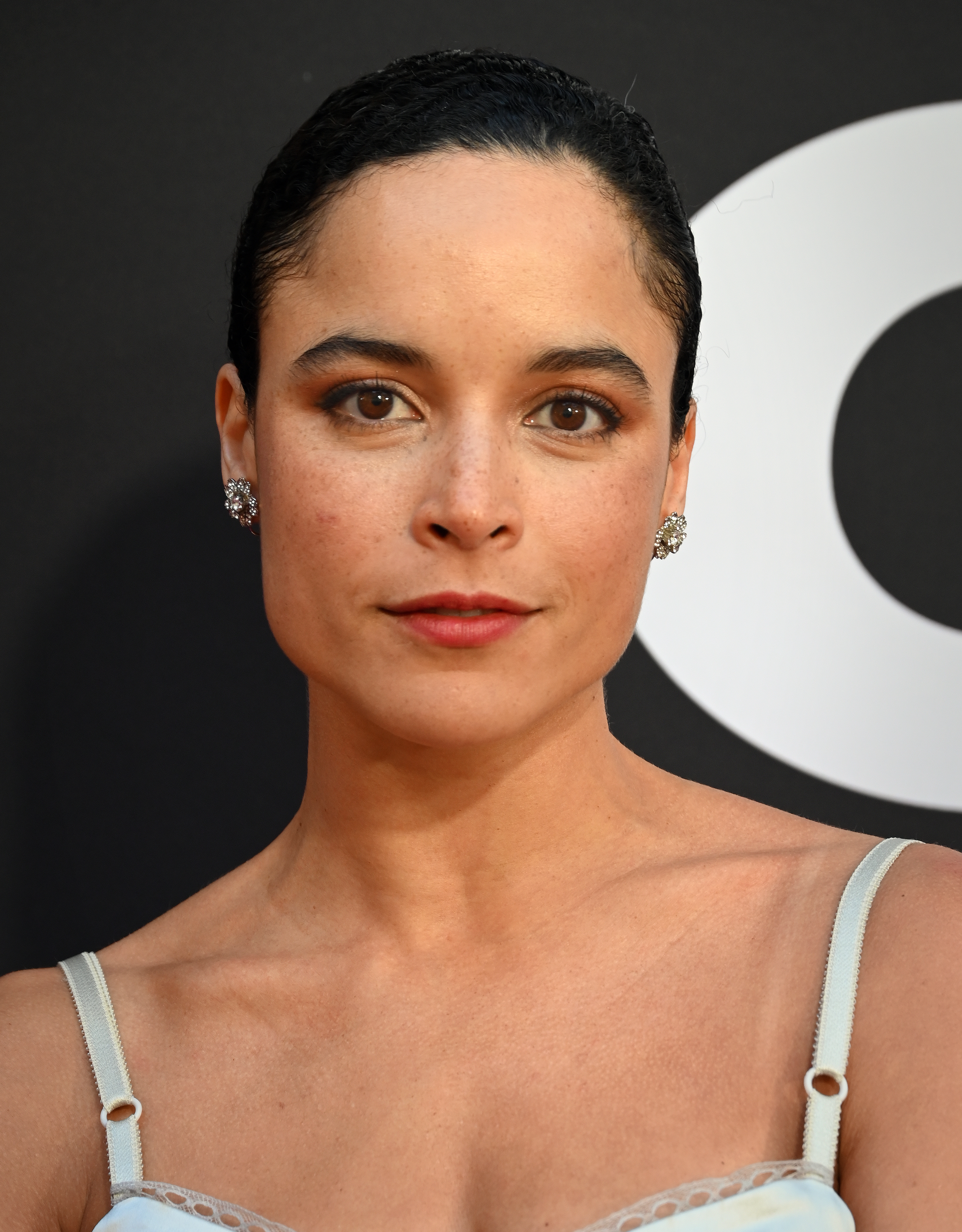
- Canfield in 2025
- Education: Yale University (BA, MFA)
- Occupation: Actress
- Years active: 2017–present
- Relatives: Cass Canfield (great-grandfather)

Juliana Canfield is an American actress. She is best known for her role as Jess Jordan on the HBO series Succession (2018–2023). She is also known for portraying Beth DeVille on the post-apocalyptic drama series Y: The Last Man (2021) and acted in the Peacock crime drama series The Calling (2022) and the FX on Hulu anthology series American Horror Story: Delicate (2023–2024).

Canfield made her Broadway debut in Stereophonic (2024) earning a nomination for the Tony Award for Best Featured Actress in a Play.

== Early life and education ==
Canfield earned a Bachelor of Arts degree majoring in English and graduated cum laude from Yale College in 2014. She then attended and graduated from the Yale School of Drama with an MFA in Acting in 2017. Her great-grandfather was the book publisher Cass Canfield. She was a debutante at the French debutante ball Bal des Débutantes in Paris in 2013.

== Career ==
In 2017, just after graduating from the Yale School of Drama, Canfield auditioned for the role of Willa Ferreyra in the HBO comedy-drama Succession. She was instead cast as Jess Jordan, Kendall Roy's executive assistant, in a recurring co-starring role. From the third season onward, Canfield was promoted to a guest starring role with her character playing a larger role with more screen time. Canfield's role as Jordan was highlighted by The Ringer critic Jessica MacLeish who called her "one of the most compelling Succession characters".

Canfield played the role of Christina in the 2019 revival of Maria Irene Fornes's play Fefu and Her Friends at the Theatre for a New Audience in Brooklyn.

In 2021, Canfield starred as Beth DeVille, the girlfriend of lead character Yorick Brown, the only male survivor of a virus that wipes out all others with a Y-chromosome, on the FX comic-book adaptation Y: The Last Man. In 2022, Canfield portrayed an NYPD detective, Janine Harris, in the crime drama The Calling.

In 2024, she made her Broadway debut as Holly in Stereophonic. She was nominated for a Tony for Best Featured Actress in a Play.

== Personal life ==
Canfield lives in New York City. She is in a relationship with actor Edmund Donovan.

== Acting credits ==
=== Film ===
Year	Film	Role	Notes
2019	The Assistant	Sasha	
2020	On the Rocks	Amanda	
2025	The Family McMullen	Karen Martin	
2027	F.A.S.T. †		Post-production

=== Television ===
Year	Film	Role	Notes
2018–2023	Succession	Jess Jordan	25 episodes
2020	Amazing Stories	Nina Bowman	Episode: "The Rift"
2021	Y: The Last Man	Beth DeVille	Main role
2022	The Calling	Janine Harris	Main role
2023–2024	American Horror Story: Delicate	Talia Thompson	6 episodes

=== Theatre ===
Year	Film	Role	Venue	Notes	Ref.
2018	He Brought Her Heart Back in a Box	Kay	Theatre for a New Audience	Off-Broadway	
2018	The House That Will Not Stand	Maude Lynn Albans	New York Theatre Workshop	Off-Broadway	
2019	Sunday	Gil	Atlantic Theater Company	Off-Broadway	
2019	Fefu and Her Friends	Christina	Theatre for a New Audience	Off-Broadway	
2023	Stereophonic	Holly	Playwrights Horizons	Off-Broadway	
2024	Stereophonic	Holly	John Golden Theatre	Broadway	
2026	Girl, Interrupted	Susanna Kaysen	The Public Theater	Off-Broadway	

== Awards and nominations ==
Year	Association	Category	Project	Result	Ref.
2022	Actor Awards	Outstanding Performance by an Ensemble in a Drama Series	Succession	Won	
2024	Actor Awards	Outstanding Performance by an Ensemble in a Drama Series	Succession	Won	
2024	Tony Awards	Best Featured Actress in a Play	Stereophonic	Nominated	

== See also ==
- African-American Tony nominees and winners
