= List of awards and nominations received by Succession =

Awards and nominations received by Succession
Awards and nominations
Award	Wins	Nominations
AACTA International Awards	3	8
AARP's Movies for Grownups Awards	0	1
ACE Eddie Awards	1	2
American Film Institute Awards	4	4
Art Directors Guild Awards	1	2
Artios Awards	3	4
British Academy Television Awards	2	4
British Academy Television Craft Awards	1	2
Cinema Audio Society Awards	0	1
Critics' Choice Television Awards	8	18
Directors Guild of America Awards	2	11
Dorian TV Awards	2	5
Golden Globe Awards	9	18
Golden Reel Awards	1	2
Grammy Awards	0	1
Hollywood Critics Association TV Awards	6	18
Location Managers Guild Awards	1	1
Peabody Awards	1	1
Primetime Emmy Awards	14	39
Primetime Creative Arts Emmy Awards	5	36
Producers Guild of America Awards	3	3
Satellite Awards	6	17
Set Decorators Society of America Awards	2	2
Screen Actors Guild Awards	2	10
Shorty Awards	0	1
Society of Composers & Lyricists Awards	1	3
Television Critics Association Awards	4	13
Writers Guild of America Awards	6	9

Totals (Note: Certain award groups do not simply award one winner. They acknowledge several different recipients, have runners-up, and have third place. Since this is a specific recognition and is different from losing an award, runner-up mentions are considered wins in this award tally. For simplification and to avoid errors, each award in this list has been presumed to have had a prior nomination.)
- Wins: 92
- Nominations: 250

Succession is an American satirical black comedy-drama and family saga television series created by Jesse Armstrong for HBO. The series centers on the Roy family, the owners of Waystar RoyCo, a global media and entertainment conglomerate, who are fighting for control of the company amid uncertainty about the health of the family's patriarch, Logan Roy portrayed by Brian Cox. It stars an ensemble cast including Jeremy Strong, Kieran Culkin, Sarah Snook, Matthew Macfadyen, Nicholas Braun, Alan Ruck, Hiam Abbass, Peter Friedman, Natalie Gold, and Rob Yang, with Dagmara Domińczyk, Arian Moayed, J. Smith-Cameron, Justine Lupe, David Rasche, and Fisher Stevens featured in recurring roles before being promoted to the main cast.

The series has been widely acclaimed by critics for its writing, performances (particularly Cox's, Strong's, Culkin's, Snook's and Macfadyen's), musical score, production values, and examination of its subject matter. Succession has been nominated for many awards, including 75 Primetime Emmy Awards (19 wins), 18 Golden Globe Awards (nine wins), one Grammy Award, 18 Critics' Choice Television Awards (eight wins), three Producers Guild of America Awards (won all three), Nine Writers Guild of America Awards (six wins), and one Peabody Awards (won). It was also selected by the American Film Institute as one of its top 10 television programs of the year for all four seasons.

Succession won the Primetime Emmy Award for Outstanding Drama Series and the Golden Globe Award for Best Television Series – Drama in 2020, 2022, and 2023. Jeremy Strong and Kieran Culkin won both the Primetime Emmy Award for Outstanding Lead Actor in a Drama Series and the Golden Globe Award for Best Actor – Television Series Drama, Sarah Snook won the Primetime Emmy Award for Outstanding Lead Actress in a Drama Series and the Golden Globe Award for Best Actress – Television Series Drama, while Macfadyen won the Primetime Emmy Award for Outstanding Supporting Actor in a Drama Series twice and the Golden Globe Award for Best Supporting Actor – Series, Miniseries or Television Film. Brian Cox also won a Golden Globe Award for his performance in the series. The main cast also won the Screen Actors Guild Award for Outstanding Performance by an Ensemble in a Drama Series in 2022 and 2024. Armstrong has four wins for the Primetime Emmy Award for Outstanding Writing for a Drama Series. The third season broke the record for the most Emmy acting nominations in a single year, with 14.

== Emmy Awards ==
=== Primetime Emmy Awards ===
Primetime Emmy Awards and nominations received by Succession
Year	Category	Nominee(s)	Result	Ref.
2019	Outstanding Drama Series	Jesse Armstrong, Adam McKay, Will Ferrell, Frank Rich, Kevin Messick, Mark Mylod, Jane Tranter, Tony Roche, Lucy Prebble, Georgia Pritchett, Jonathan Glatzer, Jon Brown, Dara Schnapper and Jonathan Filley	Nominated	
2019	Outstanding Directing for a Drama Series	Adam McKay (for "Celebration")	Nominated	
2019	Outstanding Writing for a Drama Series	Jesse Armstrong (for "Nobody Is Ever Missing")	Won	
2020	Outstanding Drama Series	Jesse Armstrong, Adam McKay, Will Ferrell, Frank Rich, Kevin Messick, Mark Mylod, Jane Tranter, Tony Roche, Scott Ferguson, Jon Brown, Georgia Pritchett, Jonathan Glatzer, Will Tracy, Dara Schnapper, Gabrielle Mahon and Lucy Prebble	Won	
2020	Outstanding Directing for a Drama Series	Mark Mylod (for "This Is Not for Tears")	Nominated	
2020	Outstanding Directing for a Drama Series	Andrij Parekh (for "Hunting")	Won	
2020	Outstanding Lead Actor In a Drama Series	Brian Cox (for "Hunting")	Nominated	
2020	Outstanding Lead Actor In a Drama Series	Jeremy Strong (for "This Is Not for Tears")	Won	
2020	Outstanding Supporting Actor in a Drama Series	Nicholas Braun (for "This Is Not for Tears")	Nominated	
2020	Outstanding Supporting Actor in a Drama Series	Kieran Culkin (for "Tern Haven")	Nominated	
2020	Outstanding Supporting Actor in a Drama Series	Matthew Macfadyen (for "This Is Not for Tears")	Nominated	
2020	Outstanding Supporting Actress in a Drama Series	Sarah Snook (for "The Summer Palace")	Nominated	
2020	Outstanding Writing for a Drama Series	Jesse Armstrong (for "This Is Not for Tears")	Won	
2022	Outstanding Drama Series	Jesse Armstrong, Adam McKay, Will Ferrell, Frank Rich, Kevin Messick, Mark Mylod, Jane Tranter, Tony Roche, Scott Ferguson, Jon Brown, Lucy Prebble, Will Tracy, Georgia Pritchett, Ted Cohen, Susan Soon He Stanton, Dara Schnapper, Gabrielle Mahon and Francesca Gardiner	Won	
2022	Outstanding Directing for a Drama Series	Mark Mylod (for "All the Bells Say")	Nominated	
2022	Outstanding Directing for a Drama Series	Lorene Scafaria (for "Too Much Birthday")	Nominated	
2022	Outstanding Directing for a Drama Series	Cathy Yan (for "The Disruption")	Nominated	
2022	Outstanding Lead Actor in a Drama Series	Brian Cox (for "All the Bells Say")	Nominated	
2022	Outstanding Lead Actor in a Drama Series	Jeremy Strong (for "Too Much Birthday")	Nominated	
2022	Outstanding Supporting Actor in a Drama Series	Nicholas Braun (for "Retired Janitors of Idaho")	Nominated	
2022	Outstanding Supporting Actor in a Drama Series	Kieran Culkin (for "Too Much Birthday")	Nominated	
2022	Outstanding Supporting Actor in a Drama Series	Matthew Macfadyen (for "All the Bells Say")	Won	
2022	Outstanding Supporting Actress in a Drama Series	J. Smith-Cameron (for "The Disruption")	Nominated	
2022	Outstanding Supporting Actress in a Drama Series	Sarah Snook (for "Chiantishire")	Nominated	
2022	Outstanding Writing for a Drama Series	Jesse Armstrong (for "All the Bells Say")	Won	
2023	Outstanding Drama Series	Jesse Armstrong, Adam McKay, Will Ferrell, Frank Rich, Kevin Messick, Mark Mylod, Jane Tranter, Tony Roche, Scott Ferguson, Jon Brown, Lucy Prebble, Will Tracy, Georgia Pritchett, Ted Cohen, Susan Soon He Stanton, Dara Schnapper, Gabrielle Mahon and Francesca Gardiner	Won	
2023	Outstanding Directing for a Drama Series	Andrij Parekh (for "America Decides")	Nominated	
2023	Outstanding Directing for a Drama Series	Mark Mylod (for "Connor's Wedding")	Won	
2023	Outstanding Directing for a Drama Series	Lorene Scafaria (for "Living+")	Nominated	
2023	Outstanding Lead Actor in a Drama Series	Brian Cox (for "Rehearsal")	Nominated	
2023	Outstanding Lead Actor in a Drama Series	Kieran Culkin (for "Church and State")	Won	
2023	Outstanding Lead Actor in a Drama Series	Jeremy Strong (for "With Open Eyes")	Nominated	
2023	Outstanding Lead Actress in a Drama Series	Sarah Snook (for "Tailgate Party")	Won	
2023	Outstanding Supporting Actor in a Drama Series	Nicholas Braun (for "America Decides")	Nominated	
2023	Outstanding Supporting Actor in a Drama Series	Matthew Macfadyen (for "Tailgate Party")	Won	
2023	Outstanding Supporting Actor in a Drama Series	Alan Ruck (for "Rehearsal")	Nominated	
2023	Outstanding Supporting Actor in a Drama Series	Alexander Skarsgård (for "Kill List")	Nominated	
2023	Outstanding Supporting Actress in a Drama Series	J. Smith-Cameron (for "Living+")	Nominated	
2023	Outstanding Writing for a Drama Series	Jesse Armstrong (for "Connor's Wedding")	Won	

=== Primetime Creative Arts Emmy Awards ===
Primetime Creative Arts Emmy Awards and nominations received by Succession
Year	Category	Nominee(s)	Result	Ref.
2019	Outstanding Casting for a Drama Series	Douglas Aibel, Henry Russell Bergstein and Francine Maisler	Nominated	
2019	Outstanding Original Main Title Theme Music	Nicholas Britell	Won	
2020	Outstanding Guest Actor in a Drama Series	James Cromwell (for "Dundee")	Nominated	
2020	Outstanding Guest Actress in a Drama Series	Cherry Jones (for "Tern Haven")	Won	
2020	Outstanding Guest Actress in a Drama Series	Harriet Walter (for "Return")	Nominated	
2020	Outstanding Casting for a Drama Series	Avy Kaufman	Won	
2020	Outstanding Music Composition for a Series (Original Dramatic Score)	Nicholas Britell (for "This Is Not for Tears")	Nominated	
2020	Outstanding Single-Camera Picture Editing for a Drama Series	Ken Eluto (for "DC")	Nominated	
2020	Outstanding Single-Camera Picture Editing for a Drama Series	Bill Henry and Venya Bruk (for "This Is Not for Tears")	Won	
2020	Outstanding Production Design for a Narrative Contemporary Program (One Hour or More)	Stephen H. Carter, Carmen Cardenas, George DeTitta and Ana Buljan (for "This Is Not for Tears")	Nominated	
2022	Outstanding Guest Actor in a Drama Series	Adrien Brody (for "Lion in the Meadow")	Nominated	
2022	Outstanding Guest Actor in a Drama Series	James Cromwell (for "Retired Janitors of Idaho")	Nominated	
2022	Outstanding Guest Actor in a Drama Series	Arian Moayed (for "Retired Janitors of Idaho")	Nominated	
2022	Outstanding Guest Actor in a Drama Series	Alexander Skarsgård (for "All the Bells Say")	Nominated	
2022	Outstanding Guest Actress in a Drama Series	Hope Davis (for "Retired Janitors of Idaho")	Nominated	
2022	Outstanding Guest Actress in a Drama Series	Sanaa Lathan (for "What It Takes")	Nominated	
2022	Outstanding Guest Actress in a Drama Series	Harriet Walter (for "Chiantishire")	Nominated	
2022	Outstanding Casting for a Drama Series	Avy Kaufman and Francine Maisler	Won	
2022	Outstanding Music Composition for a Series (Original Dramatic Score)	Nicholas Britell (for "Chiantishire")	Nominated	
2022	Outstanding Production Design for a Narrative Contemporary Program (One Hour or More)	Stephen H. Carter, Marci Mudd and George DeTitta, Jr. (for "Too Much Birthday")	Nominated	
2022	Outstanding Single-Camera Picture Editing for a Drama Series	Ken Eluto and Ellen Tam (for "All the Bells Say")	Nominated	
2022	Outstanding Single-Camera Picture Editing for a Drama Series	Jane Rizzo (for "Chiantishire")	Nominated	
2022	Outstanding Sound Mixing for a Comedy or Drama Series (One Hour)	Nicholas Renbeck, Andy Kris and Ken Ishii (for "Too Much Birthday")	Nominated	
2023	Outstanding Casting for a Drama Series	Avy Kaufman	Nominated	
2023	Outstanding Contemporary Costumes for a Series	Michelle Matland, Jonathan Schwartz, Mark Agnes (for "Church and State")	Nominated	
2023	Outstanding Guest Actor in a Drama Series	James Cromwell (for "Church and State")	Nominated	
2023	Outstanding Guest Actor in a Drama Series	Arian Moayed (for "Honeymoon States")	Nominated	
2023	Outstanding Guest Actress in a Drama Series	Hiam Abbass (for "Honeymoon States")	Nominated	
2023	Outstanding Guest Actress in a Drama Series	Cherry Jones (for "The Munsters")	Nominated	
2023	Outstanding Guest Actress in a Drama Series	Harriet Walter (for "Church and State")	Nominated	
2023	Outstanding Music Composition for a Series (Original Dramatic Score)	Nicholas Britell (for "Connor's Wedding")	Nominated	
2023	Outstanding Picture Editing for a Drama Series	Jane Rizzo (for "America Decides")	Nominated	
2023	Outstanding Picture Editing for a Drama Series	Bill Henry (for "Connor's Wedding")	Nominated	
2023	Outstanding Picture Editing for a Drama Series	Ken Eluto (for "With Open Eyes")	Nominated	
2023	Outstanding Production Design for a Narrative Contemporary Program (One Hour or More)	Stephen H. Carter, Molly Mikula, George Detitta Jr. (for "America Decides")	Nominated	
2023	Outstanding Sound Mixing for a Comedy or Drama Series (One Hour)	Andy Kris, Nicholas Renbeck, Ken Ishii, Tommy Vicari (for "Connor's Wedding")	Nominated	

=== Emmy awards and nominations for the cast ===
Emmy awards and nominations for the cast
Actor	Character	Category	Seasons			
Actor	Character	Category	1	2	3	4
Brian Cox	Logan Roy	Lead Actor		Nominated	Nominated	Nominated
Jeremy Strong	Kendall Roy	Lead Actor		Won	Nominated	Nominated
Nicholas Braun	Greg Hirsch	Supporting Actor		Nominated	Nominated	Nominated
Kieran Culkin	Roman Roy	Supporting Actor		Nominated	Nominated	
Kieran Culkin	Roman Roy	Lead Actor				Won
Matthew Macfadyen	Tom Wambsgans	Supporting Actor		Nominated	Won	Won
Sarah Snook	Shiv Roy	Supporting Actress		Nominated	Nominated	
Sarah Snook	Shiv Roy	Lead Actress				Won
James Cromwell	Ewan Roy	Guest Actor		Nominated	Nominated	Nominated
Cherry Jones	Nan Pierce	Guest Actress		Won		Nominated
Harriet Walter	Lady Caroline Collingwood	Guest Actress		Nominated	Nominated	Nominated
J. Smith-Cameron	Gerri Kellman	Supporting Actress			Nominated	Nominated
Adrien Brody	Josh Aaronson	Guest Actor			Nominated	
Arian Moayed	Stewy Hosseini	Guest Actor			Nominated	Nominated
Alexander Skarsgård	Lukas Matsson	Guest Actor			Nominated	
Alexander Skarsgård	Lukas Matsson	Supporting Actor				Nominated
Hope Davis	Sandi Furness	Guest Actress			Nominated	
Sanaa Lathan	Lisa Arthur	Guest Actress			Nominated	
Alan Ruck	Connor Roy	Supporting Actor				Nominated
Hiam Abbass	Marcia Roy	Guest Actress				Nominated

== Other awards ==
Awards and nominations received by Succession
Award	Year	Category	Nominee(s)	Result	Ref.
AACTA International Awards	2022	Best Drama Series	Succession	Won	
AACTA International Awards	2022	Best Actor in a Series	Jeremy Strong	Nominated	
AACTA International Awards	2022	Best Actress in a Series	Sarah Snook	Nominated	
AACTA International Awards	2024	Best Drama Series	Succession	Won	
AACTA International Awards	2024	Best Actor in a Series	Kieran Culkin	Nominated	
AACTA International Awards	2024	Best Actor in a Series	Matthew Macfayden	Nominated	
AACTA International Awards	2024	Best Actor in a Series	Jeremy Strong	Nominated	
AACTA International Awards	2024	Best Actress in a Series	Sarah Snook	Won	
AARP's Movies for Grownups Awards	2022	Best TV Series	Succession	Nominated	
AARP's Movies for Grownups Awards	2024	Best TV Movie/Series or Limited Series	Succession	Won	
AARP's Movies for Grownups Awards	2024	Best Actor (TV)	Brian Cox	Nominated	
ACE Eddie Awards	2022	Best Edited Drama Series	Ken Eluto (for "All the Bells Say")	Won	
ACE Eddie Awards	2022	Best Edited Drama Series	Jane Rizzo (for "Chiantishire")	Nominated	
ACE Eddie Awards	2024	Best Edited Drama Series	Ken Eluto (for "With Open Eyes")	Nominated	
ACE Eddie Awards	2024	Best Edited Drama Series	Bill Henry (for "Connor's Wedding")	Nominated	
American Film Institute Awards	2018	Top 10 TV Programs of the Year	Succession	Won	
American Film Institute Awards	2019	Top 10 TV Programs of the Year	Succession	Won	
American Film Institute Awards	2021	Top 10 TV Programs of the Year	Succession	Won	
American Film Institute Awards	2023	Top 10 TV Programs of the Year	Succession	Won	
Art Directors Guild Awards	2022	Excellence in Production Design for a One-Hour Contemporary Single-Camera Series	Stephen Carter (for "The Disruption" and "Too Much Birthday")	Nominated	
Art Directors Guild Awards	2024	Excellence in Production Design for a One-Hour Contemporary Single-Camera Series	Stephen Carter (for "America Decides")	Won	
Artios Awards	2020	Television Pilot & First Season – Drama	Francine Maisler, Douglas Aibel and Henry Russell Bergstein	Nominated	
Artios Awards	2021	Television Series – Drama	Avy Kaufman	Won	
Artios Awards	2023	Television Series – Drama	Avy Kaufman, Lilia Trapani, Harrison Nesbit	Won	
Artios Awards	2024	Television Series – Drama	Avy Kaufman, Scotty Anderson	Won	
Astra TV Awards	2022	Best Cable Network Series, Drama	Succession	Won (Note: Tied with Better Call Saul)	
Astra TV Awards	2022	Best Actor in a Broadcast Network or Cable Series, Drama	Brian Cox	Nominated	
Astra TV Awards	2022	Best Actor in a Broadcast Network or Cable Series, Drama	Jeremy Strong	Nominated	
Astra TV Awards	2022	Best Supporting Actor in a Broadcast Network or Cable Series, Drama	Kieran Culkin	Nominated	
Astra TV Awards	2022	Best Supporting Actor in a Broadcast Network or Cable Series, Drama	Matthew Macfadyen	Nominated	
Astra TV Awards	2022	Best Supporting Actress in a Broadcast Network or Cable Series, Drama	J. Smith-Cameron	Nominated	
Astra TV Awards	2022	Best Supporting Actress in a Broadcast Network or Cable Series, Drama	Sarah Snook	Nominated	
Astra TV Awards	2022	Best Writing in a Broadcast Network or Cable Series, Drama	Jesse Armstrong (for "All the Bells Say")	Nominated	
Astra TV Awards	2022	Best Directing in a Broadcast Network or Cable Series, Drama	Mark Mylod (for "All the Bells Say")	Nominated	
Astra TV Awards	2022	Best Directing in a Broadcast Network or Cable Series, Drama	Lorene Scafaria (for "Too Much Birthday")	Nominated	
Astra TV Awards	2022	Best Directing in a Broadcast Network or Cable Series, Drama	Cathy Yan (for "The Disruption")	Nominated	
Astra TV Awards	2023	Best Cable Series, Drama	Succession	Won	
Astra TV Awards	2023	Best Actor in a Broadcast Network or Cable Series, Drama	Kieran Culkin	Nominated	
Astra TV Awards	2023	Best Actress in a Broadcast Network or Cable Series, Drama	Sarah Snook	Won	
Astra TV Awards	2023	Best Supporting Actor in a Broadcast Network or Cable Series, Drama	Alexander Skarsgård	Nominated	
Astra TV Awards	2023	Best Supporting Actor in a Broadcast Network or Cable Series, Drama	Matthew Macfadyen	Won	
Astra TV Awards	2023	Best Directing in a Broadcast Network or Cable Series, Drama	Mark Mylod (for "Connor's Wedding")	Won	
Astra TV Awards	2023	Best Writing in a Broadcast Network or Cable Series, Drama	Jesse Armstrong (for "Connor's Wedding")	Won	
Astra Creative Arts TV Awards	2023	Best Short Form Series	Succession: Controlling the Narrative	Nominated	
Astra Creative Arts TV Awards	2023	Best Guest Actor in a Drama Series	Arian Moayed	Nominated	
Astra Creative Arts TV Awards	2023	Best Casting in a Drama Series	Succession	Nominated	
Black Reel Awards for Television	2022	Outstanding Guest Actress, Drama Series	Sanaa Lathan	Won	
British Academy Television Awards	2019	Best International Programme	Succession	Won	
British Academy Television Awards	2020	Best International Programme	Succession	Nominated	
British Academy Television Awards	2022	Best International Programme	Succession	Nominated	
British Academy Television Awards	2022	Best Supporting Actor	Matthew Macfadyen	Won	
British Academy Television Awards	2024	Best International Programme	Succession	Nominated	
British Academy Television Awards	2024	Best Actor	Brian Cox	Nominated	
British Academy Television Awards	2024	Best Supporting Actor	Matthew Macfadyen	Won	
British Academy Television Awards	2024	Best Supporting Actress	Harriet Walter	Nominated	
British Academy Television Awards	2024	Memorable Moment	Logan Roy's death	Nominated	
British Academy Television Craft Awards	2020	Best Writer: Drama	Jesse Armstrong	Won	
British Academy Television Craft Awards	2022	Best Writer: Drama	Jesse Armstrong	Nominated	
British Academy Television Craft Awards	2024	Best Writer: Drama	Jesse Armstrong	Nominated	
Cinema Audio Society Awards	2022	Outstanding Achievement in Sound Mixing for Television Series – One Hour	Ken Ishii, Andy Kris, Nicholas Renbeck, Tommy Vicari, Mark DeSimone, and Micah Blaichman (for "Secession")	Nominated	
Cinema Audio Society Awards	2024	Outstanding Achievement in Sound Mixing for Television Series – One Hour	Ken Ishii. Andy Kris, Nicholas Renbeck. Thomas Vicari. Mark DeSimone, and Micah Blaichman (for "Connor's Wedding")	Nominated	
Critics' Choice Television Awards	2019	Best Drama Series	Succession	Nominated	
Critics' Choice Television Awards	2019	Best Supporting Actor in a Drama Series	Matthew Macfadyen	Nominated	
Critics' Choice Television Awards	2020	Best Drama Series	Succession	Won	
Critics' Choice Television Awards	2020	Best Actor in a Drama Series	Jeremy Strong	Won	
Critics' Choice Television Awards	2020	Best Actress in a Drama Series	Sarah Snook	Nominated	
Critics' Choice Television Awards	2022	Best Drama Series	Succession	Won	
Critics' Choice Television Awards	2022	Best Actor in a Drama Series	Brian Cox	Nominated	
Critics' Choice Television Awards	2022	Best Actor in a Drama Series	Jeremy Strong	Nominated	
Critics' Choice Television Awards	2022	Best Supporting Actor in a Drama Series	Nicholas Braun	Nominated	
Critics' Choice Television Awards	2022	Best Supporting Actor in a Drama Series	Kieran Culkin	Won	
Critics' Choice Television Awards	2022	Best Supporting Actor in a Drama Series	Matthew Macfadyen	Nominated	
Critics' Choice Television Awards	2022	Best Supporting Actress in a Drama Series	J. Smith-Cameron	Nominated	
Critics' Choice Television Awards	2022	Best Supporting Actress in a Drama Series	Sarah Snook	Won	
Critics' Choice Television Awards	2024	Best Drama Series	Succession	Won	
Critics' Choice Television Awards	2024	Best Actor in a Drama Series	Kieran Culkin	Won	
Critics' Choice Television Awards	2024	Best Actor in a Drama Series	Jeremy Strong	Nominated	
Critics' Choice Television Awards	2024	Best Actress in a Drama Series	Sarah Snook	Won	
Critics' Choice Television Awards	2024	Best Supporting Actor in a Drama Series	Matthew Macfadyen	Nominated	
Directors Guild of America Awards	2019	Outstanding Directorial Achievement in Dramatic Series	Adam McKay (for "Celebration")	Won	
Directors Guild of America Awards	2020	Outstanding Directorial Achievement in Dramatic Series	Mark Mylod (for "This Is Not for Tears")	Nominated	
Directors Guild of America Awards	2022	Outstanding Directorial Achievement in Dramatic Series	Kevin Bray (for "Retired Janitors of Idaho")	Nominated	
Directors Guild of America Awards	2022	Outstanding Directorial Achievement in Dramatic Series	Mark Mylod (for "All the Bells Say")	Won	
Directors Guild of America Awards	2022	Outstanding Directorial Achievement in Dramatic Series	Andrij Parekh (for "What It Takes")	Nominated	
Directors Guild of America Awards	2022	Outstanding Directorial Achievement in Dramatic Series	Robert Pulcini & Shari Springer Berman (for "Lion in the Meadow")	Nominated	
Directors Guild of America Awards	2022	Outstanding Directorial Achievement in Dramatic Series	Lorene Scafaria (for "Too Much Birthday")	Nominated	
Directors Guild of America Awards	2024	Outstanding Directorial Achievement in Dramatic Series	Becky Martin (for "Rehearsal")	Nominated	
Directors Guild of America Awards	2024	Outstanding Directorial Achievement in Dramatic Series	Mark Mylod (for "Connor's Wedding")	Nominated	
Directors Guild of America Awards	2024	Outstanding Directorial Achievement in Dramatic Series	Andrij Parekh (for "America Decides")	Nominated	
Directors Guild of America Awards	2024	Outstanding Directorial Achievement in Dramatic Series	Robert Pulcini & Shari Springer Berman (for "Tailgate Party")	Nominated	
Dorian TV Awards	2022	Best TV Drama	Succession	Nominated	
Dorian TV Awards	2022	Best Supporting TV Performance	Matthew Macfadyen	Nominated	
Dorian TV Awards	2023	Best TV Drama	Succession	Won	
Dorian TV Awards	2023	Best TV Performance — Drama	Kieran Culkin	Nominated	
Dorian TV Awards	2023	Best TV Performance — Drama	Sarah Snook	Won	
Golden Globe Awards	2019	Best Supporting Actor – Series, Miniseries or Television Film	Kieran Culkin	Nominated	
Golden Globe Awards	2020	Best Television Series – Drama	Succession	Won	
Golden Globe Awards	2020	Best Actor – Television Series Drama	Brian Cox	Won	
Golden Globe Awards	2020	Best Supporting Actor – Series, Miniseries or Television Film	Kieran Culkin	Nominated	
Golden Globe Awards	2022	Best Television Series – Drama	Succession	Won	
Golden Globe Awards	2022	Best Actor – Television Series Drama	Brian Cox	Nominated	
Golden Globe Awards	2022	Best Actor – Television Series Drama	Jeremy Strong	Won	
Golden Globe Awards	2022	Best Supporting Actor – Series, Miniseries or Television Film	Kieran Culkin	Nominated	
Golden Globe Awards	2022	Best Supporting Actress – Series, Miniseries or Television Film	Sarah Snook	Won	
Golden Globe Awards	2024	Best Television Series – Drama	Succession	Won	
Golden Globe Awards	2024	Best Actor – Television Series Drama	Brian Cox	Nominated	
Golden Globe Awards	2024	Best Actor – Television Series Drama	Kieran Culkin	Won	
Golden Globe Awards	2024	Best Actor – Television Series Drama	Jeremy Strong	Nominated	
Golden Globe Awards	2024	Best Actress – Television Series Drama	Sarah Snook	Won	
Golden Globe Awards	2024	Best Supporting Actor – Series, Miniseries or Television Film	Matthew Macfadyen	Won	
Golden Globe Awards	2024	Best Supporting Actor – Series, Miniseries or Television Film	Alan Ruck	Nominated	
Golden Globe Awards	2024	Best Supporting Actor – Series, Miniseries or Television Film	Alexander Skarsgård	Nominated	
Golden Globe Awards	2024	Best Supporting Actress – Series, Miniseries or Television Film	J. Smith-Cameron	Nominated	
Golden Reel Awards	2022	Outstanding Achievement in Sound Editing: One Hour – Comedy or Drama – Dialogue / ADR	Nicholas Renbeck, Michael Feuser and Angela Organ (for "Secession")	Won	
Golden Reel Awards	2024	Outstanding Achievement in Sound Editing: One Hour – Comedy or Drama – Dialogue / ADR	Nicholas Renbeck, Dan Korintus, Angela Organ and Andy Kris (for "Connor's Wedding")	Nominated	
Golden Trailer Awards	2023	Best Drama for a TV/Streaming Series (Trailer/Teaser/TV Spot)	"Battle Royale" (Create Advertising Group)	Won	
Golden Trailer Awards	2023	Best Original Score TV Spot (for a Feature Film)	"Nothing's the Same" (MOTIVE)	Nominated	
Golden Trailer Awards	2023	Best Drama/Action Poster for a TV/Streaming Series	"Domestic Payoff" (AV Print)	Nominated	
Grammy Awards	2023	Best Score Soundtrack for Visual Media	Nicholas Britell	Nominated	
Hollywood Music in Media Awards	2023	Best Original Score — TV Show/Limited Series	Nicholas Britell	Won	
Location Managers Guild Awards	2022	Outstanding Locations in Contemporary Television	Paul Eskenazi, Enrico Latella	Won	
Peabody Awards	2020	Entertainment	Succession	Won	
Producers Guild of America Awards	2020	Outstanding Producer of Episodic Television – Drama	Jesse Armstrong, Adam McKay, Frank Rich, Kevin Messick, Mark Mylod, Jane Tranter, Tony Roche, Scott Ferguson, Jon Brown, Georgia Pritchett, Will Tracy, Jonathan Glatzer, Dara Schnapper and Gabrielle Mahon	Won	
Producers Guild of America Awards	2022	Outstanding Producer of Episodic Television – Drama	Jesse Armstrong, Adam McKay, Will Ferrell, Frank Rich, Kevin Messick, Mark Mylod, Jane Tranter, Tony Roche, Scott Ferguson, Jon Brown, Lucy Prebble, Will Tracy, Georgia Pritchett, Ted Cohen, Susan Soon He Stanton, Francesca Gardiner, Dara Schnapper and Gabrielle Mahon.	Won	
Producers Guild of America Awards	2024	Outstanding Producer of Episodic Television – Drama	Succession	Won	
Satellite Awards	2019	Best Television Series – Drama	Succession	Nominated	
Satellite Awards	2020	Best Television Series – Drama	Succession	Won	
Satellite Awards	2020	Best Actor in a Drama/Genre Series	Brian Cox	Nominated	
Satellite Awards	2020	Best Supporting Actor in a Series, Miniseries or TV Film	Jeremy Strong	Won	
Satellite Awards	2020	Best Ensemble: Television	Succession	Won	
Satellite Awards	2022	Best Television Series – Drama	Succession	Nominated	
Satellite Awards	2022	Best Actor in a Drama/Genre Series	Brian Cox	Nominated	
Satellite Awards	2022	Best Actor in a Drama/Genre Series	Jeremy Strong	Nominated	
Satellite Awards	2022	Best Actress in a Drama/Genre Series	Sarah Snook	Won	
Satellite Awards	2022	Best Ensemble: Television	Succession	Won	
Satellite Awards	2024	Best Drama Series	Succession	Nominated	
Satellite Awards	2024	Best Actor – Drama or Genre Series	Brian Cox	Nominated	
Satellite Awards	2024	Best Actor – Drama or Genre Series	Jeremy Strong	Nominated	
Satellite Awards	2024	Best Actress – Drama or Genre Series	Sarah Snook	Nominated	
Satellite Awards	2024	Best Supporting Actor – Series, Miniseries & Limited Series, or Motion Picture Made for Television	James Cromwell	Nominated	
Satellite Awards	2024	Best Supporting Actress – Series, Miniseries & Limited Series, or Motion Picture Made for Television	J. Smith-Cameron	Nominated	
Satellite Awards	2024	Best Ensemble – Television	Succession	Won	
Set Decorators Society of America Awards	2022	Best Achievement in Décor/Design of a One Hour Contemporary Series	George DeTitta Jr., Stephen Carter	Won	
Set Decorators Society of America Awards	2023	Best Achievement in Décor/Design of a One Hour Contemporary Series	George DeTitta Jr., Brandi Kalish, Stephen Carter	Won	
Screen Actors Guild Awards	2022	Outstanding Performance by an Ensemble in a Drama Series	Hiam Abbass, Nicholas Braun, Juliana Canfield, Brian Cox, Kieran Culkin, Dagmara Domińczyk, Peter Friedman, Jihae, Justine Lupe, Matthew Macfadyen, Dasha Nekrasova, Scott Nicholson, David Rasche, Alan Ruck, J. Smith-Cameron, Sarah Snook, Fisher Stevens, Jeremy Strong, and Zoë Winters	Won	
Screen Actors Guild Awards	2022	Outstanding Performance by a Male Actor in a Drama Series	Brian Cox	Nominated	
Screen Actors Guild Awards	2022	Outstanding Performance by a Male Actor in a Drama Series	Jeremy Strong	Nominated	
Screen Actors Guild Awards	2022	Outstanding Performance by a Male Actor in a Drama Series	Kieran Culkin	Nominated	
Screen Actors Guild Awards	2022	Outstanding Performance by a Female Actor in a Drama Series	Sarah Snook	Nominated	
Screen Actors Guild Awards	2024	Outstanding Performance by an Ensemble in a Drama Series	Nicholas Braun, Juliana Canfield, Brian Cox, Kieran Culkin, Dagmara Domińczyk, Peter Friedman, Justine Lupe, Matthew Macfadyen, Arian Moayed, Scott Nicholson, David Rasche, Alan Ruck, J. Smith-Cameron, Sarah Snook, Fisher Stevens, Jeremy Strong, and Zoë Winters	Won	
Screen Actors Guild Awards	2024	Outstanding Performance by a Male Actor in a Drama Series	Brian Cox	Nominated	
Screen Actors Guild Awards	2024	Outstanding Performance by a Male Actor in a Drama Series	Kieran Culkin	Nominated	
Screen Actors Guild Awards	2024	Outstanding Performance by a Male Actor in a Drama Series	Matthew Macfadyen	Nominated	
Screen Actors Guild Awards	2024	Outstanding Performance by a Female Actor in a Drama Series	Sarah Snook	Nominated	
Shorty Awards	2019	Best TV Series	Succession	Nominated	
Society of Composers & Lyricists Awards	2020	Outstanding Original Score for a Television or Streaming Production	Nicholas Britell	Nominated	
Society of Composers & Lyricists Awards	2022	Outstanding Original Score for a Television Production	Nicholas Britell	Nominated	
Society of Composers & Lyricists Awards	2024	Outstanding Original Score for a Television Production	Nicholas Britell	Won	
Television Critics Association Awards	2019	Outstanding Achievement in Drama	Succession	Nominated	
Television Critics Association Awards	2019	Outstanding New Program	Succession	Nominated	
Television Critics Association Awards	2020	Program of the Year	Succession	Nominated	
Television Critics Association Awards	2020	Outstanding Achievement in Drama	Succession	Won	
Television Critics Association Awards	2020	Individual Achievement in Drama	Jeremy Strong	Nominated	
Television Critics Association Awards	2022	Program of the Year	Succession	Nominated	
Television Critics Association Awards	2022	Outstanding Achievement in Drama	Succession	Won	
Television Critics Association Awards	2022	Individual Achievement in Drama	Jeremy Strong	Nominated	
Television Critics Association Awards	2023	Program of the Year	Succession	Won	
Television Critics Association Awards	2023	Outstanding Achievement in Drama	Succession	Won	
Television Critics Association Awards	2023	Individual Achievement in Drama	Kieran Culkin	Nominated	
Television Critics Association Awards	2023	Individual Achievement in Drama	Sarah Snook	Nominated	
Television Critics Association Awards	2023	Individual Achievement in Drama	Jeremy Strong	Nominated	
Writers Guild of America Awards	2019	Television: Dramatic Series	Jesse Armstrong, Simon Blackwell, Jon Brown, Jonathan Glatzer, Anna Jordan, Lucy Prebble, Georgia Pritchett, Tony Roche, Susan Soon He Stanton and Daniel Zelman	Nominated	
Writers Guild of America Awards	2019	Television: New Series	Jesse Armstrong, Simon Blackwell, Jon Brown, Jonathan Glatzer, Anna Jordan, Lucy Prebble, Georgia Pritchett, Tony Roche, Susan Soon He Stanton and Daniel Zelman	Nominated	
Writers Guild of America Awards	2020	Television: Dramatic Series	Jesse Armstrong, Alice Birch, Jon Brown, Jonathan Glatzer, Cord Jefferson, Mary Laws, Lucy Prebble, Georgia Pritchett, Tony Roche, Gary Shteyngart, Susan Soon He Stanton and Will Tracy	Won	
Writers Guild of America Awards	2020	Television: Episodic Drama	Will Tracy (for "Tern Haven")	Won	
Writers Guild of America Awards	2022	Television: Dramatic Series	Jesse Armstrong, Jon Brown, Jamie Carragher, Ted Cohen, Francesca Gardiner, Lucy Prebble, Georgia Pritchett, Tony Roche, Susan Soon He Stanton, and Will Tracy	Won	
Writers Guild of America Awards	2022	Television: Episodic Drama	Tony Roche & Susan Soon He Stanton (for "Retired Janitors of Idaho")	Won	
Writers Guild of America Awards	2024	Television: Dramatic Series	Will Arbery, Jesse Armstrong, Miriam Battye, Jon Brown, Jamie Carragher, Ted Cohen, Nate Elston, Francesca Gardiner, Callie Hersheway, Lucy Prebble, Georgia Pritchett, Tony Roche, Susan Soon He Stanton, Will Tracy	Won	
Writers Guild of America Awards	2024	Television: Episodic Drama	Jon Brown & Ted Cohen (for "Kill List")	Nominated	
Writers Guild of America Awards	2024	Television: Episodic Drama	Georgia Pritchett & Will Arbery (for "Living+")	Won	
