= Vaulter =

Vaulter may refer to:

- Pole vaulter, an athlete in pole vault
- Equestrian vaulter, a person who performs equestrian vaulting
- Vaulter (Succession), the second episode of the second season of the television series Succession
- Gymnastic vaulter, a gymnast who uses a vault
