= Tern Haven =

- Succession episode
- Episode no.: Season 2 Episode 5
- Directed by: Mark Mylod
- Written by: Will Tracy
- Original air date: September 8, 2019
- Running time: 64 minutes

Guest appearances
- Holly Hunter as Rhea Jarrell; Cherry Jones as Nan Pierce; Caitlin FitzGerald as Tabitha; Annabelle Dexter-Jones as Naomi Pierce; Justine Lupe as Willa; Jeremy Shamos as Mark Pierce; Mark Linn-Baker as Maxim Pierce; Max Gordon Moore as Peter Pierce; Christina Rouner as Marnie Pierce; Scott Nicholson as Colin

Episode chronology
← Previous "Safe Room"	Next → "Argestes"
- Succession season 2

"Tern Haven" is the fifth episode of the second season of the American satirical comedy-drama television series Succession, and the 15th episode overall. It was written by Will Tracy and directed by Mark Mylod, and originally aired on HBO on September 8, 2019.

"Tern Haven" shows the Roy family meeting with another billionaire family, the Pierces, in a step toward a potential acquisition of the Pierce family media conglomerate PGM by Waystar RoyCo. The episode introduces several new characters, including Nan Pierce, and marks the first on-screen appearance of Naomi Pierce, previously only mentioned.

== Plot ==
Logan officially announces his plans to acquire rival media giant Pierce Global Media (PGM), but informs the family that they first have to spend the weekend at the estate of the Pierce family to allay concerns about the Roys' moral character. PGM's readership and sales have floundered over the last two years, presenting a clearer opportunity for the Roys. Nonetheless, Logan, who is staunchly determined to win the acquisition, gives his family meticulous instructions on how to present themselves to the Pierces. Kendall is told to arrive later than the rest of the family under the pretense of "volunteering."

The Pierces receive the Roys at Tern Haven, their family estate on Long Island. The Roys have already established certain inroads with the Pierces: Frank is personal friends with the family matriarch Nan Pierce, while Roman's girlfriend Tabitha once had a sexual relationship with Nan's cousin Naomi, who has made a special trip for the meeting with the Roys.

The two families mingle, though there is friction between Connor and Maxim Pierce, a consultant at the Brookings Institution who doesn't take Connor's presidential ambitions seriously, as well as between Shiv and Mark Pierce, an academic to whom she makes a condescending joke. Kendall soon arrives, and Rhea hints to him that she is on his family's side. Logan takes his family aside and scolds them for not meeting his expectations of how they must "perform"; Marcia expresses her frustration with Logan for his neurotic behavior.

That night, the two families have dinner together, which becomes increasingly tense as the Pierces probe into the lives of the Roys. Marcia makes comments suggesting that she is resentful of how Logan treats her, and Tom feels pressured when the liberal Pierces repeatedly insult him over his position at ATN. When Nan asks Logan whom he intends to nominate as his successor, tensions reach a breaking point: Logan refuses to answer the question, prompting an indignant Shiv to proclaim that she has already been chosen, stunning the room. Nan ends the dinner and ushers everyone outdoors to go stargazing.

While everyone else gathers outside, Shiv takes solace in her bedroom and panics to Tom, regretting her outburst. Meanwhile, Kendall and Naomi, who had immediately bonded over their common struggle with addiction, sneak off to do cocaine together, and later get drunk and have sex inside the Roys' helicopter. Naomi admits to Kendall that she despises the Roys for running tabloids on her during the peak of her substance abuse, and that she is only here to ensure that an acquisition deal fails. Kendall suggests to her that the money from an acquisition could free her from the entanglements of being part of a family business empire.

In the middle of the night, Roman and Tabitha attempt to have sex for the first time, but Roman struggles to perform, and Tabitha is put off by his unusual fetishes. He visits Gerri's room and masturbates without difficulty to her erotic humiliation.

The following morning, Nan, Rhea and Naomi meet privately with Logan, Shiv, Gerri and Kendall, and agree to sell PGM's ownership to the Roys on the condition that Shiv is named Logan's successor. Logan refuses their terms and calls off the deal, but suggests to Nan that her family needs the money in order for their company to survive. As soon as the Roys land back in Manhattan, Logan receives a phone call saying the Pierces have reconsidered, and that the deal is a success. The Roys celebrate at Logan's apartment, but Logan himself chooses to reflect in his room alone.

== Production ==
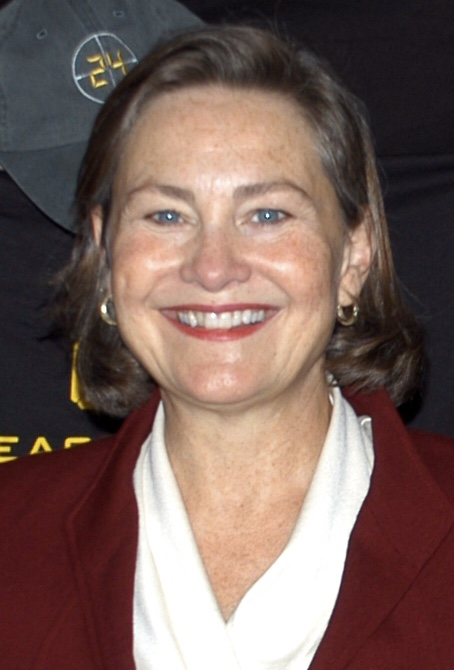
Cherry Jones plays Pierce family matriarch Nan Pierce. She won the Primetime Emmy Award for Outstanding Guest Actress in a Drama Series for her performance in "Tern Haven."

"Tern Haven" was written by Will Tracy, the former editor-in-chief of The Onion, and directed by Mark Mylod in his sixth episode for the series. The episode derives its name from the Pierces' family estate.

=== Writing ===
"Tern Haven" marks the on-screen introduction of the Pierce family, owners of left-leaning media company PGM. The Pierce family has no single real-world analog, but Tracy indicated the family was inspired by the Bancrofts, Sulzbergers and Grahams, which he referred to as "...reputable, blue-blood, northeastern, legacy-media families". Their narrative also resembles those of the American Taylor and Chandler media families. Actress Cherry Jones, who plays matriarch Nan Pierce, likened the character to a "wannabe Katharine Graham".

The production team did not create the Pierce family members as "doppelgänger analogs". Instead, the other family was designed to "...feed a mounting sense of friction," though critics noted parallels between individual Roy-Pierce pairs. Writing for The New Yorker, Rachel Syme described the Pierce family aesthetic as "shabby chic," indicating dynastic wealth, as opposed to the sleeker, arriviste fashion choices of the Roys.

=== Filming ===
A mansion on Long Island was used as the Pierces' titular estate. Stephen Carter, the production designer for the show, originally considered the "Tern Haven" mansion as a shooting location for the Roys' summer home in the season premiere, but it ultimately fit better for the "...New England, Hyannis Port-style vibe" the production team sought for the Pierce family. The home originally belonged to Junius Spencer Morgan, who named it "Salutation". The estate is one of several in the area used as filming locations for the second season.

Given the series' tight production schedule, the episode's dinner scene was shot in only two days, with each individual moment filmed concurrently. The script did not specify seating arrangements for the characters, so Mylod seated the actors according to the dialogue and his insight into the characters. He explained, "Nan would’ve put herself at the back of the table, with her back to the fireplace. She has the power position. She'll have put Logan opposite her." Additionally, Mylod had the camera crew gradually move closer to the actors in order to make the audience feel "intimately connected" to the scene, particularly during Shiv's outburst.

== Reception ==
=== Ratings ===
Upon airing, the episode was watched by 0.507 million viewers, with an 18-49 rating of 0.11.

=== Critical reception ===
"Tern Haven" received critical acclaim, with particular praise directed at Tracy's script, the performances, and the dynamic between the Roys and Pierces. On Rotten Tomatoes, the episode has a rating of 94% based on 17 reviews, with the critics' consensus stating, "Cultural and political differences collide when the elder Roy struggles to convince the Pierce family to hand over their crown jewels in the highly fascinating, intensely devastating 'Tern Haven.'"

Randall Colburn of The A.V. Club gave the episode a B+, noting how the episode developed the relationship between Logan and Shiv, and praising the "gorgeous" scene in which Kendall and Naomi bond over their similar histories with their respective families. Vox considered "Tern Haven" to be the best episode of Succession to date, pointing out the Shakespearian influence over the Roy-Pierce dynamic and also singling out the scenes between Kendall and Naomi for praise. The reviewers also enjoyed the introduction of the Pierces, describing them as a "hilarious jumble of upper-class nonsense." Vulture's Scott Tobias rated the episode 5 out of 5 stars, praising the dialogue and remarking on the added depth given to Shiv and Tom's relationship. Joanna Robinson, writing for Vanity Fair, noted the episode's focus on "female ambition" and the goals of the women in the cast, heightened by the introduction of the "matriarchal Pierce family". Den of Geek's Andrew Husband rated the episode 4.5 out of 5 stars, considering the episode the second half of a "brilliant two-parter" that began with the previous week's "Safe Room". Husband remarked on how the episode's plot highlighted each of the Roys' unique idiosyncrasies.

=== Accolades ===
At the 72nd Primetime Emmy Awards, Cherry Jones won the award for Outstanding Guest Actress in a Drama Series for her performance in the episode and Kieran Culkin submitted this episode to support his nomination for Outstanding Supporting Actor in a Drama Series.
