= Succession season 2 =

Season of television series

Succession
- Season 2
- Promotional poster
- Showrunner: Jesse Armstrong
- Starring: Hiam Abbass; Nicholas Braun; Brian Cox; Kieran Culkin; Dagmara Domińczyk; Peter Friedman; Matthew Macfadyen; Arian Moayed; Alan Ruck; J. Smith-Cameron; Sarah Snook; Jeremy Strong; Rob Yang
- No. of episodes: 10

Release
- Original network: HBO
- Original release: August 11 – October 13, 2019

Season chronology
- ← Previous; Season 1 Next → Season 3

The second season of the American satirical comedy-drama television series Succession premiered on HBO on August 11, 2019. Series creator Jesse Armstrong serves as the showrunner for the season. The series centers on the Roy family, the owners of global media and entertainment conglomerate Waystar RoyCo, and their fight for control of the company amidst uncertainty about the health of the family's patriarch.

The season features an ensemble cast of Hiam Abbass, Nicholas Braun, Brian Cox, Kieran Culkin, Peter Friedman, Matthew Macfadyen, Alan Ruck, Sarah Snook, Jeremy Strong and Rob Yang, who all return from the previous season. Dagmara Domińczyk, Arian Moayed and J. Smith-Cameron were promoted to the main cast for the season after featuring in recurring roles in the previous season.

In June 2018, HBO renewed Succession for a second season, which began filming in 2019. The season consists of ten episodes, and received critical acclaim. It was nominated for 18 Primetime Emmy Awards, and received seven wins, including Outstanding Drama Series, as well as Outstanding Lead Actor in a Drama Series for Strong, Outstanding Guest Actress in a Drama Series for Cherry Jones, Outstanding Writing for a Drama Series for Armstrong, and Outstanding Directing for a Drama Series for Andrij Parekh.

== Cast and characters ==
=== Main ===
- Hiam Abbass as Marcia Roy
- Nicholas Braun as Greg Hirsch
- Brian Cox as Logan Roy
- Kieran Culkin as Roman Roy
- Dagmara Domińczyk as Karolina Novotney
- Peter Friedman as Frank Vernon
- Matthew Macfadyen as Tom Wambsgans
- Arian Moayed as Stewy Hosseini
- Alan Ruck as Connor Roy
- J. Smith-Cameron as Gerri Kellman
- Sarah Snook as Siobhan "Shiv" Roy
- Jeremy Strong as Kendall Roy
- Rob Yang as Lawrence Yee

=== Recurring ===
- Justine Lupe as Willa Ferreyra
- David Rasche as Karl Muller
- Fisher Stevens as Hugo Baker
- Larry Pine as Sandy Furness
- Ashley Zukerman as Nate Sofrelli
- Eric Bogosian as Gil Eavis
- Caitlin FitzGerald as Tabitha Hayes
- Danny Huston as Jamie Laird
- Scott Nicholson as Colin Stiles
- Jeannie Berlin as Cyd Peach
- Patch Darragh as Ray
- Holly Hunter as Rhea Jarrell
- Cherry Jones as Nan Pierce
- Annabelle Dexter-Jones as Naomi Pierce
- Babak Tafti as Eduard Asgarov
- Swayam Bhatia as Sophie Roy
- Quentin Morales as Iverson Roy
- Zoe Winters as Kerry Castellabate
- Juliana Canfield as Jess Jordan
- Brian Hotaling as Mark Rosenstock

=== Guest ===
- Zack Robidas as Mark Ravenhead
- James Cromwell as Ewan Roy
- Harriet Walter as Lady Caroline Collingwood
- Mark Linn-Baker as Maxim Pierce

== Episodes ==
No. overall	No. in season	Title	Directed by	Written by	Original release date	U.S. viewers (millions)
11	1	"The Summer Palace"	Mark Mylod	Jesse Armstrong	August 11, 2019	0.612
48 hours after Shiv and Tom's wedding, Kendall is pulled out of a rehab facility in Iceland to give a public statement regarding his decision to back off from his role in the hostile takeover. Logan's financial adviser Jamie Laird suggests that he sell the company and name his successor. Despite going to rehab, Kendall continues to indulge his cocaine addiction and receives his deliveries from Greg. The Roys assemble for lunch at the family's summer home in the Hamptons. Logan is unable to extract an honest opinion from his children about whether he should sell the company; he has each of his children individually meet him in his office, and offers Shiv the role of CEO during their meeting. Shiv is eager for the opportunity, but does not disclose it to Tom, only telling him that he has been promoted to ATN's Chair of Global Broadcast News. That night, Logan flies Kendall to a meeting with Stewy and Sandy, who refuse to come to a compromise.
12	2	"Vaulter"	Andrij Parekh	Jon Brown	August 18, 2019	0.603
Gil tells Shiv he'd name her chief of staff if he won the presidential election. Connor and Willa return to New York, where Connor prepares to announce his own bid for President. Logan suggests to Shiv that it would take three years for her to fully integrate into her CEO role. Tom tasks Greg with rooting out inefficiencies in ATN's operations, despite Greg's reluctance to work for the network. Logan has Kendall and Roman review Vaulter's performance; Kendall wants to keep the company, but Roman reports to Logan that its business is failing and that its employees want to unionize. Logan sides with Roman and tasks Kendall with closing down Vaulter. Shiv tells Tom that Logan offered her the role of CEO, which puts Tom's ambitions to inherit the company in jeopardy; Shiv assures him that his inheritance is safe. Shiv later quits Gil's campaign. Kendall terminates Vaulter's staff, flatly telling Lawrence that he is doing so on his father's orders.
13	3	"Hunting"	Andrij Parekh	Tony Roche	August 25, 2019	0.607
Logan plans to acquire rival media giant Pierce Global Media (PGM), against the counsel of his peers and family, and rehires Frank due to his friendship with the head of its board. The family departs on a hunting retreat in Hungary. On the way, Logan is furious to learn that someone disclosed information on him to author Michelle Pantsil, who is writing an unauthorized biography on him. While hunting, Greg confides to Tom that he met with Pantsil, and begs him to keep it a secret. Connor announces his presidential bid on a platform against taxation. Shiv has a one-night stand while Tom is away. During dinner, Logan finds out that PGM is already aware of his plans, and subjects Greg, Tom and Karl to a vicious hazing ritual called "Boar on the Floor" until the source comes forth. Kendall finds out that it was Roman who privately reached out to the Pierces. The next morning, Logan learns that Mo, a recently deceased board member, talked to Pantsil, absolving Greg of suspicion. Frank informs Logan that PGM's CEO is interested in a meeting. Logan tells Shiv it is time to bring her into the company.
14	4	"Safe Room"	Shari Springer Berman & Robert Pulcini	Georgia Pritchett	September 1, 2019 (Note: "Safe Room" was first made available on August 30, 2019, through HBO's digital platform.)	0.577
Logan and Kendall meet with Rhea Jarrell, CEO of PGM, who relays the Pierce family's disinterest in selling their company. Tom investigates ATN anchor Mark Ravenhead, an alleged Nazi sympathizer, but their meeting is cut short by the sound of a gunshot. The building's occupants are ushered into panic rooms, where Kendall and Logan sway Rhea with a $24 billion offer for PGM, which she agrees to pass on to the Pierces. The source of the gunshot is found to have been an ATN employee who committed suicide in his office. Greg reveals to Tom that he kept copies of the cruises documents and blackmails him into giving him a promotion. Connor and Willa attend Mo (real name Lester McClintock)'s funeral; Pantsil is present and presses Connor on his association with Lester, a known sexual predator, but Willa helps rewrite Connor's eulogy to avoid him being entrapped by Pantsil. Roman, following Gerri's advice on how to earn his father's respect, enrolls in Waystar's management training program. He later finds himself sexually aroused when Gerri scolds him over the phone. Kendall tearfully confides to Shiv his belief that his loyalty to Logan is all he is worth.
15	5	"Tern Haven"	Mark Mylod	Will Tracy	September 8, 2019	0.507
The Roys spend a weekend with the Pierces at their family estate. Conversations between the families become increasingly tense and culminate when matriarch Nan Pierce asks Logan during dinner who will replace him as CEO. Logan refuses to name his successor, and an indignant Shiv stuns the room by announcing she has been chosen. Kendall indulges in drugs and sex with Nan's cousin Naomi, a fellow recovering addict. She admits she despises the Roys and Waystar for running tabloids on her during her troubled past, and that she came to ensure that the acquisition fails. However, Kendall convinces her that the money from the deal could free her from the entanglements of a family business. The following morning, Nan (on Naomi's advice) agrees to sell PGM to the Roys on the condition that Shiv be named Logan's successor on the day of the merger. Logan refuses and calls off the deal. However, he receives a call soon after saying the Pierces have changed their mind. The Roys celebrate at Logan's home.
16	6	"Argestes"	Matt Shakman	Susan Soon He Stanton	September 15, 2019	0.610
The Roys attend Argestes, an international business conference, where they plan to finalize their agreement with the Pierces. However, they learn that New York Magazine has received a tip on the cruise line scandal and plans to publish an exposé within the next 36 to 48 hours. Despite the Roys' attempts to block the story's publication, it goes online the following morning while Logan and Kendall meet with Nan and Rhea. Shiv meets privately with Rhea, who admits that she wants the Waystar–PGM acquisition to succeed regardless of the scandal. Roman attempts to secure an investment from Azerbaijani aristocrat Eduard Asgarov, who agrees to provide his family's money if Waystar runs propaganda on behalf of his home country. Kendall, Roman and Shiv take the stage for a scheduled panel discussion, where Shiv shocks the audience when she makes comments seemingly suggesting that Logan should step down from the company. An argument ensues after the event, during which Logan strikes Roman. Nan decides to call off the acquisition and fires Rhea for conspiring with Logan.
17	7	"Return"	Becky Martin	Jonathan Glatzer	September 22, 2019	0.508
Sandy and Stewy launch a public smear campaign against Waystar in the wake of the cruises scandal. Logan, Kendall and Roman travel to London to secure shareholder support from Caroline. Logan invites Rhea along to aid in strategy, and the two spend the night together. Shiv arrives in London and meets with Rhea, who proposes that Shiv become CEO of PGM; Shiv is not opposed to the idea, but remains suspicious of Rhea's motives. Shiv and Roman meet Caroline, who agrees to vote her shares with the family for a payout of 20 million dollars and her children visiting her every Christmas. Sandy and Stewy run tabloids suggesting that Doddy's death was a suicide triggered by Logan's bullying. Logan has Kendall come along to visit Doddy's family to sort out the situation; Kendall is thoroughly shaken, and revisits the house that night to secretly deliver cash to the family. He attempts to confide his guilt to Caroline, but she neglects to make herself available. Tom faces an internal investigation into the cruises incidents. He forces Greg to burn the latter's copies of the documents, though Greg covertly recovers some of them. Logan accuses Shiv of disloyalty for considering the PGM position; Shiv begins to suspect that Rhea may be plotting to take over the company.
18	8	"Dundee"	Kevin Bray	Mary Laws	September 29, 2019	0.579
Rhea organizes a celebration for Logan's 50th anniversary at Waystar in his hometown of Dundee, Scotland. Shiv, now intensely suspicious of Rhea, schemes with her siblings to sabotage Rhea's chances of being named Logan's successor. Though they play along in hazing Rhea, none of the other Roy children are genuinely opposed to having her take over as CEO. Ewan arrives in Dundee and warns Greg that he will relinquish his $250 million inheritance unless the latter stops working for Logan. Gerri and other company advisors inform Shiv that a whistleblower plans to go public with details of the cruises incidents and is refusing to take a payout. Realizing that Rhea will bear the burden of the scandal as CEO, Shiv gives Logan her approval to name Rhea as his successor, which he does during a speech prior to his plaque unveiling ceremony. Marcia, feeling betrayed, leaves the event. Ewan confronts his brother at the ceremony and warns him that he will face a reckoning.
19	9	"DC"	Mark Mylod	Jesse Armstrong	October 6, 2019	0.705
The company whistleblower gives a televised interview implicating Gerri, Tom, and Kendall in the cover-up of the crimes committed aboard the company cruise lines. Gil compels the Roys to testify before the Senate. Tom is the first to be called to the stand alongside Gerri and performs disastrously. Shiv attempts to leverage her past connection to Gil and learns that he has a new witness. Shiv meets with the woman, Kira, and talks her out of testifying by warning her that her allegations will follow her for the rest of her life. Logan sends Roman along with Karl and Laird to secure funding from Eduard's family so Waystar can go private; Eduard introduces them to his father in Turkey, but the pitch meeting is cut short when an anti-corruption militia holds the building's occupants hostage. Logan and Kendall testify; Logan attempts to deflect blame onto Kendall for overseeing the cover-up during his tenure as acting CEO, but Kendall delivers a sharp rebuke to Gil. After the hearing, Rhea tells Logan she no longer wants to be CEO. Logan tells Shiv that a "blood sacrifice" will have to be made to appease the company's shareholders.
20	10	"This Is Not for Tears"	Mark Mylod	Jesse Armstrong	October 13, 2019	0.660
Logan is advised by Waystar shareholders to take the blame for the cruises incidents. The Roys spend a holiday on their yacht in the Mediterranean, where they debate over who should be the company's public scapegoat. Roman, Karl and Laird return from Turkey apparently having closed the financing deal with Eduard's family, though Roman admits to Logan that it is likely illegitimate. Logan and Kendall unsuccessfully attempt to convince Stewy to back Waystar's privatization. Tom admits to Shiv that he is unhappy with their relationship. Shaken, Shiv pleads with Logan not to have Tom take the fall for the scandal. Logan ultimately chooses Kendall; during a private conversation, Kendall asks Logan if he ever saw him fit to run the company, but Logan tells his son that he doesn't see him as a "killer". The next morning, Kendall and Greg are flown back to New York for a press conference, where the former is set to accept responsibility for the company's handling of the crimes. However, Kendall suddenly deviates from his prepared remarks and instead blames Logan, announcing that his father was well aware of the misconduct and personally oversaw the ensuing legal settlements. Greg is present at the conference with the probative documents. Logan, who is watching a telecast of Kendall's statement, smiles enigmatically.

== Production ==
=== Development ===
On June 11, 2018, following the premiere of the first season, HBO renewed Succession for a ten-episode second season. The season was announced with series creator Jesse Armstrong set to continue as showrunner.

=== Casting ===
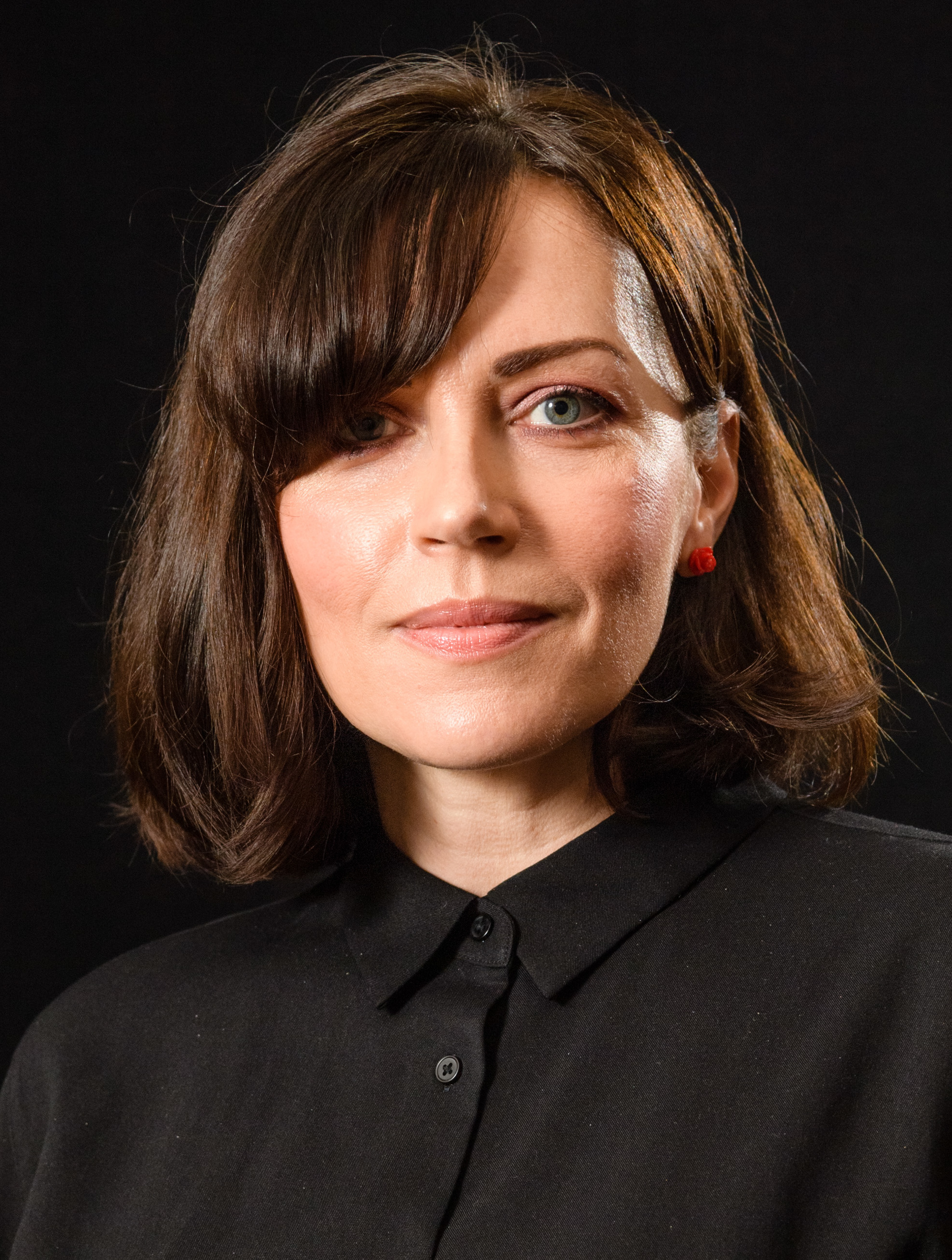
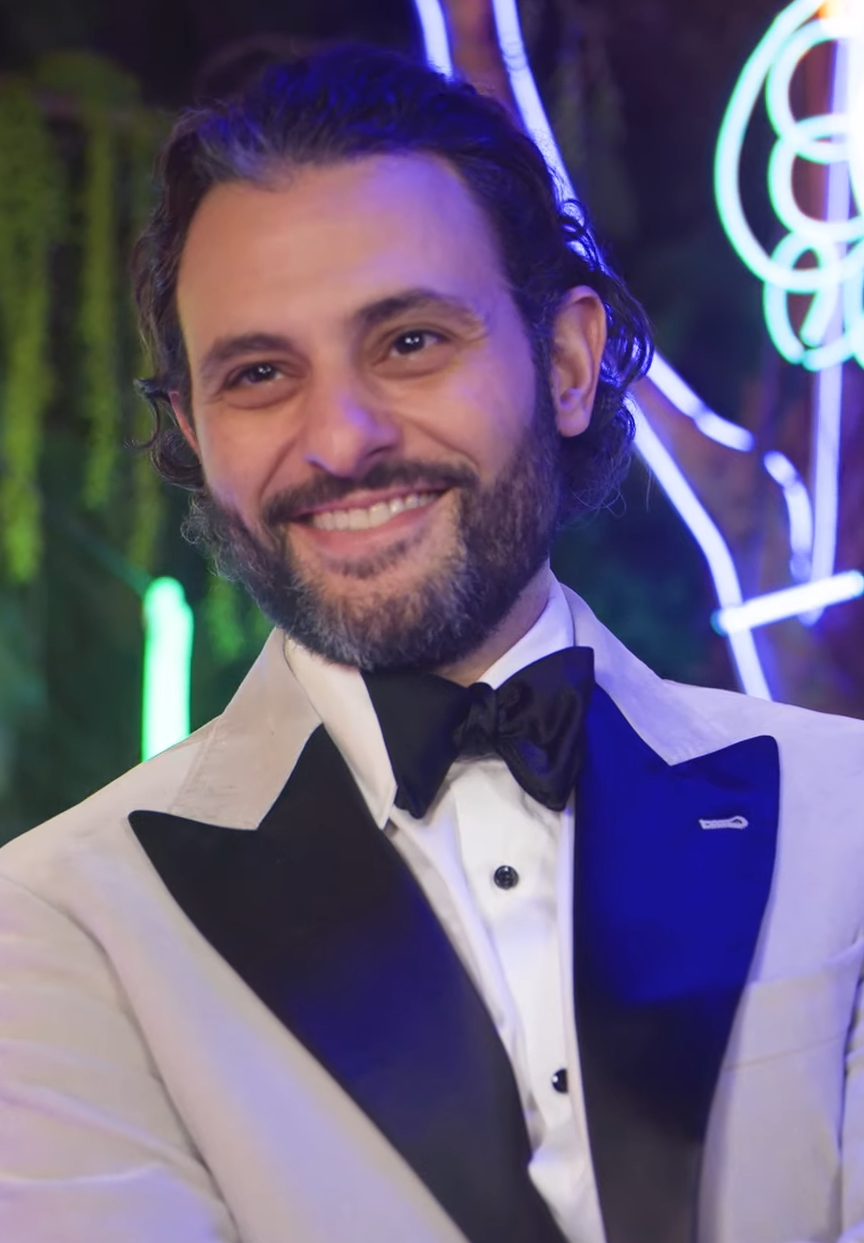
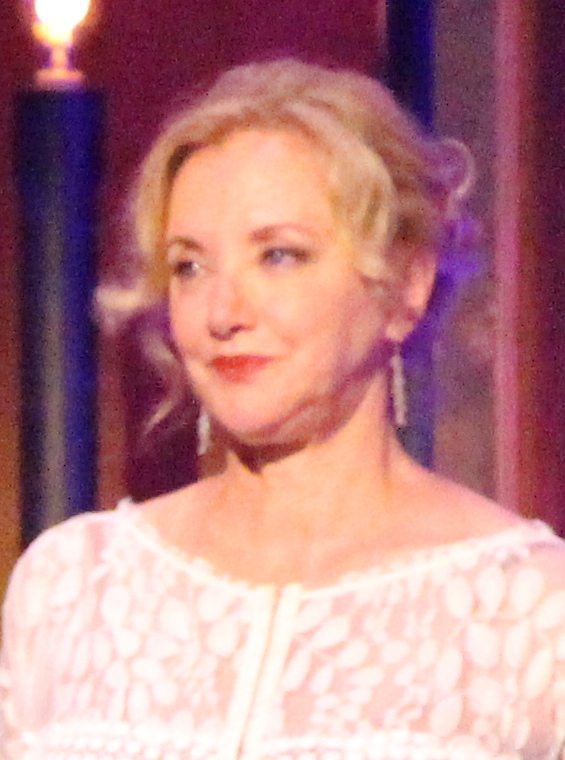
Dagmara Domińczyk, Arian Moayed and J. Smith-Cameron were promoted to the main cast for the season.

All main cast members return from the previous season, excluding Natalie Gold. Dagmara Domińczyk, Arian Moayed and J. Smith-Cameron, who previously starred in recurring roles, were promoted to the main cast for the season. On May 21, 2019, Holly Hunter joined the cast in a recurring role in the second season.

=== Filming ===
The second season saw a significant increase in location shifts. The opening scenes of the season premiere were shot on location in Iceland, while Henry Ford II's 1960 estate in the Hamptons was used as the Roys' summer home. Oheka Castle in Huntington, New York, stood in for the Roys' hunting lodge in Hungary for the episode "Hunting". Filming also took place on Long Island, with a mansion once belonging to Junius Spencer Morgan featuring prominently in the episode "Tern Haven". The estate is one of several in the area used as filming locations for the second season. From April through May 2019, the production recruited extras for filming in Lake Placid, and Lake George, New York, where the episode "Argestes" was shot. Production moved to Dundee for the eighth episode, with additional filming taking place in Glasgow and Ayr for the preceding episode (which takes place in England). Starting from July 17, 2019, the crew filmed in Korčula, Croatia, for the second-season finale episode "This Is Not for Tears", including extensive scenes on a yacht.

== Release ==
The season premiered on HBO on August 11, 2019, with episodes released weekly until the finale on October 13, 2019.

=== Home media ===
HBO released the second season on DVD on September 15, 2020.

== Reception ==
=== Audience viewership ===
The season finale drew 1.1 million viewers across all viewing platforms.

=== Critical response ===
The second season received widespread critical acclaim. On review aggregator website Rotten Tomatoes, the season holds a 97% rating with an average rating of 8.9/10, based on 238 reviews. The website's critical consensus reads, "Succession returns in darkly funny form, with sharp writing, exceptional performances, and a surprising new level of sympathy for some of television's least likable characters." On Metacritic, the season has a weighted average score of 89 out of 100, based on 19 critics, indicating "universal acclaim".

=== Accolades ===
The second season received 18 nominations with 7 wins at the 72nd Primetime Emmy Awards; including Outstanding Drama Series, Jeremy Strong for Outstanding Lead Actor in a Drama Series, Cherry Jones for Outstanding Guest Actress in a Drama Series, Jesse Armstrong for Outstanding Writing for a Drama Series (for the episode "This Is Not for Tears") and Andrij Parekh for Outstanding Directing for a Drama Series (for the episode "Hunting"). Brian Cox, Matthew Macfadyen, Kieran Culkin, Nicholas Braun, Sarah Snook, James Cromwell, and Harriet Walter all received acting nominations.
