= Nore Davis =

American stand-up comedian and actor (born 1984)

- Born: April 10, 1984 (age 42); New York City, New York, U.S.
- Notable work: Comedy Central, Inside Amy Schumer, CollegeHumor, NickMom Night Out, Yo Mamma

Comedy career
- Medium: Stand-up, sketch, television
- Genres: African-American culture, Observational comedy, family, current events
- Website: http://www.noredavis.com/

Nore Davis (born April 10, 1984) is an American stand-up comedian and actor who has appeared on Comedy Central and MTV television programming.

== Biography ==
Nore Davis was born on April 10, 1984, in New York City. He first started doing stand-up comedy during his teenage years while living in Yonkers, New York. His interest in stand-up comedy was originally a side hobby for him, as he only did open mic nights and performed on college campuses. However, after realizing that college was not for him, he knew that comedy was the only thing that he wanted to do for a living. Before eventually deciding to work full-time as a comedian, Davis used to work at a gas station, and then later in graphic design.

Early on in their careers, Davis was good friends with the then-unknown Amy Schumer. They used to share their comedy ideas together, and when Schumer eventually got her own show on Comedy Central, Inside Amy Schumer, Davis appeared in one of the sketches in the pilot episode.

Davis has also made television appearances on Russell Simmons Presents, Last Week Tonight, MTV's Nikki & Sara Live, NickMom Night Out, The Artie Lange Show, and had a minor speaking role in HBO's Boardwalk Empire. He has also been seen in many videos on CollegeHumor.

On November 28, 2014, Davis released his first comedy album, Home Game.

In May 2018, Davis released his first stand-up special, Nore Davis: You Guys are Dope on Amazon Prime. In the same year, on November 23, 2018, Davis released his second comedy album, Too Woke, on Blonde Medicine. The album was recorded at Union Hall in Brooklyn, New York in early 2018. The album was released in two volumes of 7 tracks each. It was named one of the Top Ten Best Comedy Albums of 2018 of by Vulture.

In "Argestes", the 6th episode of the 2nd season of Succession, Davis played comedian Zell Simmons.

== Personal life ==
Davis resides in New York City. He has a transgender brother, Khalil.
