= Safe Room (Succession) =

- Succession episode
- Episode no.: Season 2 Episode 4
- Directed by: Shari Springer Berman and Robert Pulcini
- Written by: Georgia Pritchett
- Original air date: September 1, 2019
- Running time: 63 minutes

Guest appearances
- Holly Hunter as Rhea Jarrell; Jeannie Berlin as Cyd Peach; Jessica Hecht as Michelle Pantsil; Justine Lupe as Willa; Caitlin FitzGerald as Tabitha; David Rasche as Karl; Zach Cherry as Brian; Zack Robidas as Mark Ravenhead; Patch Darragh as Ray; Scott Nicholson as Colin; Juliana Canfield as Jess Jordan

Episode chronology
← Previous "Hunting"	Next → "Tern Haven"
- Succession season 2

"Safe Room" is the fourth episode of the second season of the American satirical comedy-drama television series Succession, and the 14th episode overall. It was written by Georgia Pritchett and directed by Shari Springer Berman and Robert Pulcini, and originally aired on HBO on September 1, 2019.

The episode charts several character threads: Logan and Kendall work to secure the acquisition of a rival media giant; Shiv is brought in to observe the daily operations of the company; Roman enters Waystar's management training program; Tom faces an internal controversy while overseeing the company's news channel, ATN; Connor and Willa attend the funeral of a board member with a problematic past; Kendall struggles with his mental health.

The episode introduces Holly Hunter in a recurring role as Rhea Jarrell, the CEO of Waystar's rival news conglomerate Pierce Global Media (PGM).

== Plot ==
Kendall takes a trip to Waystar's rooftop, under surveillance from the security cameras. He makes a call to PGM's CEO, Rhea Jarrell, establishing contact ahead of their upcoming meeting. Shiv rides with Tom to her first day at Waystar. They are met with protests over ATN anchor Mark Ravenhead, who is under fire for his alleged support of Nazism. Logan discusses the issue at a board meeting, noting that it presents a problem for his acquisition of PGM, which leans left. He tasks Tom with scrutinizing Ravenhead to see if any of the accusations have merit.

Meanwhile, Connor and Willa attend the funeral of board member Mo, where Connor hopes to meet potential donors for his presidential campaign. Connor informs Willa that Mo's real name is in fact Lester; the nickname "Mo" is a play on the word "molester," which Lester was known to be. Michelle Pantsil is present at the funeral and presses Connor on his knowledge of Lester's past, but Willa helps Connor rewrite his eulogy into a series of generic statements to sabotage Pantsil's efforts at using any information against him.

Shiv and Gerri discuss Kendall's erratic behavior as of late, which includes shoplifting. Shiv remains perplexed as to why Kendall is suddenly so loyal to his father. Kendall, meanwhile, meets Rhea in the company parking lot and brings her upstairs to meet Logan privately. Rhea informs them that the Pierce family has no interest in selling their company. Meanwhile, Tom sits down with Ravenhead and receives strong indications that he is indeed a Nazi sympathizer; however, their meeting is cut short when a gunshot is heard in the building and everyone is ushered into safe rooms.

Logan, Shiv and Rhea are taken to a larger, more secure safe room than Tom and Greg, who are simply locked inside a random office space, much to Tom's chagrin. Kendall is brought in shortly afterwards, having visited the rooftop again. Logan and Kendall manage to sway Rhea into relaying to the Pierce family a $24B offer to purchase PGM. Shiv attempts to participate in the negotiation with a less aggressive, values-based approach but is shut down by Logan. Greg, meanwhile, admits to Tom that he no longer wants to work at ATN, but suggests that they can continue working together as part of a "business open relationship." The comparison enrages Tom, who begins pelting Greg with water bottles, but the chaos dies down once the building's premises are deemed safe to reenter. Greg reveals to Tom that he kept copies of the cruise documents and blackmails him into giving him a promotion; Tom, impressed with Greg's audacity, gleefully agrees.

Roman, meanwhile, starts the company's six-week management training program, having been advised to do so by Gerri in order to earn his father's respect. However, he is bored by the training events and behaves disrespectfully while working as a character at one of the company parks. He soon befriends an eccentric co-trainee named Brian, and the two of them successfully come up with a pitch for a new ride at Waystar's parks. However, Roman is taken aside and informed of the possible shooting at the company building, and uses the situation as an excuse to skip the class rather than present his idea.

As Rhea leaves, Logan agrees to fire Ravenhead from ATN as a "peace offering" to the Pierces. He is informed that the shooting was in fact a suicide triggered by bullying within ATN's workplace environment. That night, Roman returns from his first day of management training and initiates phone sex with Tabitha, but he is put off by her affectionate dirty talk and hangs up. Roman proceeds to call Gerri and flippantly reports his progress at the management training program; he suddenly finds himself sexually aroused when she scolds and belittles him, and Gerri plays along with his fetish while he masturbates. Shiv demands to know from Kendall why he is suddenly so subservient to Logan; Kendall, still reeling from the death of Andrew Dodds, tearfully confides to Shiv he doesn't feel he is worth anything beyond his loyalty to his father. The next morning, Kendall revisits the rooftop, only to find glass suicide barriers installed along the perimeter.

== Production ==
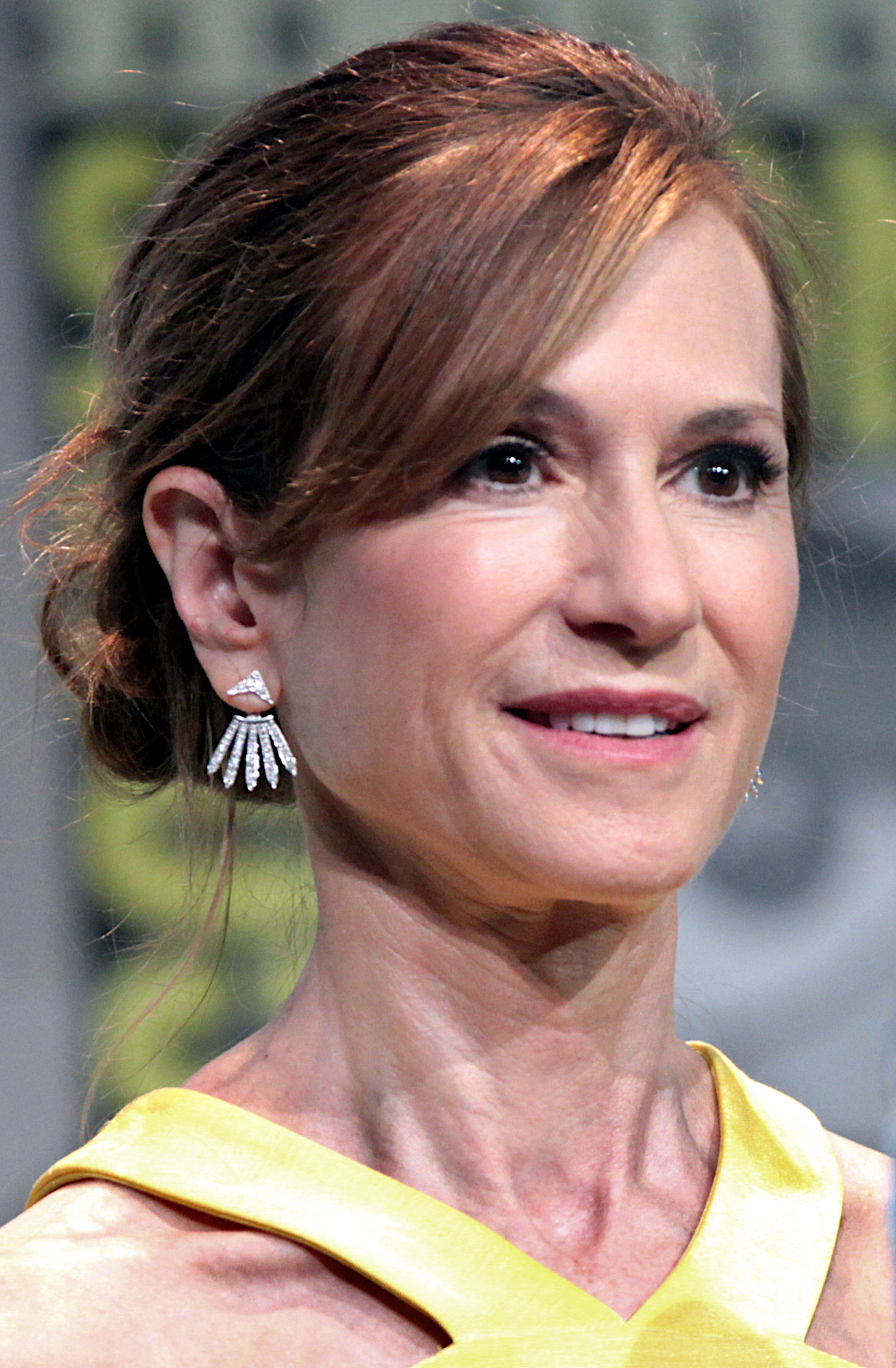
Holly Hunter makes her first appearance as Pierce CEO Rhea Jarrell in "Safe Room".

"Safe Room" was written by Georgia Pritchett and directed by husband-and-wife team Shari Springer Berman and Robert Pulcini. Actor Jeremy Strong said he used Crime and Punishment and The Manchurian Candidate as inspirations for his performance as Kendall in season 2, describing the character as an "almost somnambulistic, just dead-eyed soldier who's been weaponized, who's been made to cross further and further his own moral and ethical lines." Scott Tobias of Vulture inferred that the active-shooter scare in the episode was inspired by the real-life bomb threat in the CNN offices in December 2018.

== Reception ==
=== Ratings ===
Upon airing, the episode was watched by 0.577 million viewers, with an 18-49 rating of 0.11.

=== Critical reception ===
"Safe Room" received critical acclaim, with reviewers praising its ability to balance humor and timely political themes, and many calling it one of the series' best episodes. On Rotten Tomatoes, it has a rating of 94% based on 16 reviews, with the critics' consensus stating, "Emotions run high as the Roy family hides from a suspected active shooter in the positively riveting, wickedly funny, and unfortunately relevant 'Safe Room.'"

Randall Colburn of The A.V. Club gave "Safe Room" an A−, saying the episode "matched the darkness of its subject material with pitch-black humor that routinely tapped into many of our country’s own anxieties." Colburn praised Kendall's character development in the episode, as well as Hunter's debut and the introduction of a sexual dynamic in Roman and Gerri's relationship. Brendan Klinkenberg of Rolling Stone called the episode one of the series' strongest, also praising Hunter's introduction and calling the final scene between Kendall and Shiv the best of the season so far. Scott Tobias of Vulture gave the episode a full five stars, remarking that the series got the apparent active-shooter crisis "exactly right" in its parallels to real-world anxieties surrounding politically charged events. Tobias also praised the "amazing" subplot involving Tom and the neo-Nazi news anchor for its comedic moments and attention to detail. Emily VanDerWerff of Vox also named the episode her favorite of the season yet, praising the comedic confrontation between Tom and Greg, and found Kendall's subplot to be a "potent" summary of the series' ethos towards its commentary on the effects of wealth.
