= Argestes (Succession) =

- Succession episode
- Episode no.: Season 2 Episode 6
- Directed by: Matt Shakman
- Written by: Susan Soon He Stanton
- Original air date: September 15, 2019
- Running time: 58 minutes

Guest appearances
- Holly Hunter as Rhea Jarrell; Cherry Jones as Nan Pierce; Fisher Stevens as Hugo Baker; Danny Huston as Jamie Laird; Larry Pine as Sandy Furness; Babak Tafti as Eduard Asgarov; Juliana Canfield as Jess Jordan; Scott Nicholson as Colin; Nore Davis as Zell Simmons

Episode chronology
← Previous "Tern Haven"	Next → "Return"
- Succession season 2

"Argestes" is the sixth episode of the second season of the American satirical comedy-drama television series Succession, and the 16th episode overall. The episode was written by Susan Soon He Stanton and directed by Matt Shakman, and originally aired on HBO on September 15, 2019.

"Argestes" follows Roy family members and senior Waystar Royco executives at a media-focused retreat, Argestes. At the retreat, Logan's plans to purchase PGM are jeopardized after criminal activity by members of Waystar Royco's Brightstar cruise line comes to light.

The episode introduces Fisher Stevens as Hugo Baker, a Senior Vice President of communications in the parks and cruises division of Waystar Royco.

== Plot ==
The Roys (with the exception of Shiv) attend Argestes, an international media-focused business retreat, hoping to finalize their acquisition agreement with the Pierces. The conference attracts a large, varied crowd that includes some of the Roys' enemies, such as Lawrence, Stewy and Sandy. Shiv, meanwhile, is shadowing Frank in New York, and receives word that a news story about Waystar's cruise line scandal is about to be published.

Logan, Kendall, and Gerri are also informed about the imminent release of the article by Hugo Baker, a senior VP of communications at Waystar's parks and cruises division. They get on a call with Shiv and decide how to contain the story's release, with Kendall and Logan agreeing that the best course of action is to harass and intimidate the magazine into backing down. Logan asks Shiv to fly to the conference to help represent the company at the event should the scandal go public.

Meanwhile, Tom and Greg struggle to find an appropriate slogan for Tom's upcoming presentation on ATN after Greg discovers that the company violated viewers' privacy rights. Roman and Gerri find ways to keep Waystar financially afloat amidst the triple burden of the scandal, the takeover bid, and the PGM acquisition; Roman attempts to enlist the aid of Azerbaijani billionaire Eduard Asgarov, who agrees to provide money to Waystar if the company runs propaganda on behalf of his home country. That night, Shiv arrives at Argestes, and Tom confides in her his fear of becoming the public scapegoat for the cruises scandal, given that he was placed in charge of the documents and ordered the evidence destroyed.

The next morning, Nan and Rhea arrive at the conference and have breakfast with Logan and Kendall, who attempt to rush through the final steps in securing their deal. In the middle of the meeting, however, New York Magazine publishes their exposé of the scandal, and Logan and Kendall excuse themselves to assess the situation alongside Shiv, Roman, Gerri and Hugo. They learn the details of Lester McClintock's sexual misconduct aboard the company's cruises, and after some disagreement, decide that Kendall and Roman should represent the company at an upcoming panel discussion at the conference that night.

Rhea meets with Shiv and admits that she wants the acquisition to succeed out of her own self-interest. She also convinces Shiv to go onstage with her brothers at the event. During the panel discussion, the siblings offer conflicting responses to most of the interview questions, and the family becomes indignant when Shiv makes a comment referring to Logan as a "dinosaur" and seemingly suggests that it is time for him to step down from the company. In the argument that ensues following the event, Logan suddenly strikes Roman in the face, enraging Kendall into coming to his brother's defense.

The conference ends with a roast event hosted by stand-up comedian Zell Simmons, who makes a number of cutting jokes at the Roys regarding the cruises scandal. Nan, who was already reconsidering her relationship with the Roys, walks out of the event, and Logan and Rhea chase after her. Nan fires Rhea for conspiring with Logan behind her back and calls off the acquisition deal. An infuriated Logan is unable to do anything as Nan is driven away from Argestes.

== Production ==
The episode was primarily filmed at the Whiteface Lodge, near Lake Placid, in upstate New York. Additional filming took place in Lake George. Critics have pointed to various points of basis for the Argestes conference: Emily VanDerWerff of Vox compared it to the World Economic Forum's annual conference in Davos, while Hannah Marriott of The Guardian likened it to the Allen & Company Sun Valley Conference.

"Argestes" features actor and comedian Nore Davis. Davis expected to miss filming for Succession due to a conflict with an appearance on Conan. However, Cherry Jones, who portrays character Nan Pierce, had a scheduling issue that forced the show to change the filming date for Davis's scenes, allowing him to appear in the episode.

== Reception ==
=== Ratings ===
Upon airing, the episode was watched by 0.610 million viewers with an 18-49 rating of 0.16.

=== Critical reception ===
"Argestes" received critical acclaim, with many critics singling out its exploration of themes relevant to the Me too movement. On Rotten Tomatoes, the episode has a rating of 100%, and 9.12/10 score, based on 16 reviews, with the critics' consensus stating, "Everything Logan Roy worked for goes up in smoke when a damaging story about his company breaks in the immensely absorbing, decidedly shocking 'Argestes.'"

Randall Colburn of The A.V. Club gave the episode an A−, praising how the episode uniquely explored how sexual misconduct allegations are handled from the perspective of a company. Colburn also praised the comedic subplot involving Tom and Greg, remarking, "It’s amazing that the writers can cram in such a funny, resonant subplot into an episode that’s goddamned overflowing with major plot movements." Scott Tobias of Vulture gave the episode a full five stars, also praising the shifting character dynamics of the episode over the issue of sexual misconduct. Tobias compared the characters' behavior in the episode to the real-life scandal at Fox News: "It’s easy to imagine similar discussions at Fox News, say, after the allegations against Bill O'Reilly or Roger Ailes: There’s no question their behavior was well-known internally, but it comes down to a dollars-and-cents assessment of lost advertisers and shareholder value, not a concern for victimized women." Noel Murray of The New York Times praised both the lunchtime meeting and the panel discussion scenes as "intense" and called the climax "remarkable" for its multilayered nature. Sean T. Collins of Decider was somewhat more mixed, finding the episode's plot predictable and calling its satirical elements "pretty thin gruel," but praised the episode for giving Brian Cox "something [to do] other than insult people in the exact same tone of voice two dozen times in the space of an hour." Collins singled out the "shocking" scene where Logan hits Roman, characterizing it as a "ghostly lapse of control... made worse because it’s a parent abusing a child and no one there will ever call it what it is."
