= Return (Succession) =

- Succession episode
- Episode no.: Season 2 Episode 7
- Directed by: Becky Martin
- Written by: Jonathan Glatzer
- Original air date: September 22, 2019
- Running time: 64 minutes

Guest appearances
- Holly Hunter as Rhea Jarrell; Justine Lupe as Willa; Caitlin FitzGerald as Tabitha; Harriet Walter as Caroline Collingwood; Fisher Stevens as Hugo Baker; Annabelle Dexter-Jones as Naomi Pierce; Scott Nicholson as Colin; Zoë Winters as Kerry

Episode chronology
← Previous "Argestes"	Next → "Dundee"
- Succession season 2

"Return" is the seventh episode of the second season of the American satirical comedy-drama television series Succession, and the 17th episode overall. It was written by Jonathan Glatzer and directed by Becky Martin, and originally aired on HBO on September 22, 2019.

"Return" depicts the Roy family members in the UK, where Kendall, Roman, and Siobhan are instructed to convince their mother to side with Logan in Waystar's proxy fight. Tom grapples with the aftermath of the Brightstar Cruises exposé. Meanwhile, Logan's relationship with Rhea deepens.

== Plot ==
In the wake of the Brightstar Cruises sexual misconduct allegations, Logan hosts a party at his apartment to maintain healthy relations with his larger social circle. Frank and Gerri call Logan, Kendall, and Roman upstairs to discuss strategies to keep Waystar's shareholders on their side amid both the looming cruises scandal and Sandy and Stewy's takeover bid. They decide to fly to London to meet overseas shareholders, including Logan's second wife Caroline, who owns 3% of the company's shares. Roman informs Shiv that she has been sidelined from the discussion.

The next day at work, Tom is interviewed in an internal investigation regarding the cruises incidents, and is surprised to receive pointed and hard-hitting questions, contrary to what he was led to believe. Shiv assures Tom that his job is safe and decides to fly to London to confront her father. Tom, meanwhile, confronts Greg, who had kept copies of the documents pertaining to the scandal, and demands they be destroyed. However, while burning the copies that night, Greg discreetly recovers some of the pages and records the incident.

In London, Kendall and Roman are surprised to see that Logan has invited Rhea along to aid their efforts on account of her strategic expertise and business savvy. Logan and Rhea later spend the night together. Kendall continues his relationship with Naomi Pierce. Stewy and Sandy have begun running smears on Logan invoking the death of Andrew "Doddy" Dodds, suggesting that it was a suicide triggered by Logan's mistreatment of his hospitality staff. Logan asks Kendall, still reeling from the accident, to join him in meeting Doddy's family, and assigns Roman to talk to his mother.

Shiv arrives in London and has lunch with Rhea, who offers her own former position as CEO of PGM to Shiv. Shiv senses that this is a ploy concocted by Logan. Meanwhile, Kendall and Logan visit Doddy's family; Kendall is visibly shaken, but Logan tells him the family attributes Doddy's death to his drug problems, and not anything to do with the Roys. Later that night, Kendall secretly delivers cash to the family's mailbox.

Shiv and Roman visit their mother and tell her the acceptable range of money Logan is apparently willing to offer to buy her loyalty to the company. Caroline sees through the ruse and demands either the family's summer home in the Hamptons, or a simple US$20 million on the condition that she sees her children every Christmas, allowing Logan to ultimately choose. Kendall arrives that night and attempts to open up about his remorse over Doddy's death to Caroline, but she blocks him and asks to discuss anything "quite difficult" the following morning. Nevertheless, Kendall wakes up the next morning to find that Caroline has already left the home.

Shiv confronts Logan over her position at the company. Logan accuses her of conspiring against him, confirming that he orchestrated the meeting with Rhea. The others fly back to New York without Shiv. Logan grows increasingly comfortable with Rhea. Shiv calls Kendall to warn him that Rhea is likely dangerous.

== Production ==
"Return" was written by Jonathan Glatzer and directed by Becky Martin, who helmed the majority of Succession creator Jesse Armstrong's previous series, Peep Show. The episode was filmed in Scotland, in cities including Glasgow and Ayr, which stood in for the episode's English setting.

== Reception ==
=== Ratings ===
Upon airing, the episode was watched by 0.508 million viewers, with an 18-49 rating of 0.13.

=== Critical reception ===
"Return" received critical acclaim. On Rotten Tomatoes, the episode has a rating of 93% based on 15 reviews, with the critics' consensus stating, "With its sharp writing and strong performances across the board, "Return" keenly shows how Logan Roy and Lady Caroline manipulated and warped their adult children for personal gain."

Randall Colburn of The A.V. Club gave the episode an A and called it one of the series' best episodes, praising Jeremy Strong's "astounding" physical performance in the scenes where he visits Doddy's family, as well as the dynamic between Kendall and Roman. The episode received five stars from Scott Tobias of Vulture, who also praised the direction of the scenes at the Dodds home, as well as Holly Hunter's performance as a "diabolical" character. Noel Murray, writing for The New York Times, noted Nicholas Braun's performance as some of his "best physical and verbal comedy this week."

=== Accolades ===
Harriet Walter received a nomination for Outstanding Guest Actress in a Drama Series at the 72nd Primetime Emmy Awards for her performance in the episode.
