= Vaulter (Succession) =

- Succession episode
- Episode no.: Season 2 Episode 2
- Directed by: Andrij Parekh
- Written by: Jon Brown
- Original air date: August 18, 2019
- Running time: 62 minutes

Guest appearances
- Eric Bogosian as Gil Eavis; Jeannie Berlin as Cyd Peach; Justine Lupe as Willa; Caitlin FitzGerald as Tabitha; Ashley Zukerman as Nate Sofrelli; Juliana Canfield as Jess Jordan

Episode chronology
← Previous "The Summer Palace"	Next → "Hunting"
- Succession season 2

"Vaulter" is the second episode of the second season of the American satirical comedy-drama television series Succession, and the 12th episode overall. It was written by Jon Brown and directed by Andrij Parekh, and originally aired on HBO on August 18, 2019.

In the episode, Kendall and Roman are tasked with reviewing the performance of Vaulter, a media startup whose acquisition he personally engineered. Tom begins work at Waystar's right-leaning news network ATN and becomes privy to Shiv's expanding future at the company. The episode became notable among critics for its satire of online news publications and its various parallels to ongoing issues in the journalism industry.

== Plot ==
Logan, Kendall, Roman, and Shiv watch Stewy's interview on the takeover attempt on the competing news network PGM, and decide to retaliate immediately. Logan tasks Kendall and Roman with scrutinizing Vaulter, which is becoming a financial sink for Waystar. Senator Eavis tells Shiv he plans to name her his Chief of Staff if elected president. Shiv meets Logan to discuss his offer to run the company, but Logan suggests that it would take three years for Shiv to fully integrate into her role as CEO.

The next day, Kendall and Roman visit Vaulter's offices and inform Lawrence that they will be performing a routine check of Vaulter's performance for Logan. Lawrence attempts to stall Kendall's efforts by burying him in paperwork, while Roman takes several Vaulter employees out for drinks in an attempt to extract more valuable information from them.

The next day, Tom, who has been promoted to Chair of Global Broadcast News at ATN, meets the network's head Cyd Peach, who immediately bristles at his disdain for ATN's audience and dismisses him as another bureaucrat. Determined to make his own impact, Tom tasks Greg with rooting out inefficiencies at the network, despite Greg's discomfort with working at ATN.

Logan hears Kendall and Roman's assessment of Vaulter's performance. Kendall wants Waystar to keep the acquisition, but Roman reports having learned from intoxicated employees that Vaulter's readership is failing and that its staff wants to unionize. Logan sides with Roman and tasks Kendall with shutting down Vaulter and merging its intellectual property into Waystar's assets. Kendall reluctantly obliges.

Connor and Willa host a party celebrating their return to New York, which doubles as a canvassing event for Connor's presidential bid. While there, Greg suggests to Tom that they digitize ATN's operations; Tom takes it as an opportunity to fire employees. Shiv brings Tom back to their apartment to inform him that Logan has offered her the company. Tom expresses support but worries that the offer jeopardizes his own planned inheritance of the company; Shiv assures him the offer is likely spurious.

The next morning, Kendall confronts Lawrence about his dishonesty regarding Vaulter's performance, and attempts to talk the site's employees out of unionizing, telling Lawrence that he can convince Logan to retain the company.

Shiv and Tom have dinner with Roman and Tabitha, where Tom is roundly mocked. Shiv privately tells Roman not to consider Tom a threat. Afterwards, Shiv consults Tom's advice on how to navigate her conflicting loyalties between Eavis and Logan, both of whom have offered her significant opportunities. Tom warns her that Logan may be toying with her and suggests proceeding cautiously rather than taking his offer at face value.

Kendall has a team covertly install Wi-Fi blockers in Vaulter's offices that night and returns in the morning to inform the company's entire staff of their termination, revealing his earlier assurances to have been false. Lawrence is nonplussed and demands to know why Kendall is suddenly turning against him; Kendall flatly answers that he is doing so on his father's orders. That night, he copes by throwing a party in a temporary apartment he has gifted to Greg.

The next morning, Logan brings in Kendall to work alongside him full-time to help navigate the proxy battle against Stewy and Sandy. Shiv provokes Eavis into firing her from his campaign, then calls Logan to tell him she is ready to begin working for Waystar. That evening, Kendall shoplifts from a convenience store.

== Production ==
=== Writing ===
"Vaulter" was written by Jon Brown and directed by Andrij Parekh. It was Parekh's second time directing for the series after serving as a cinematographer for several episodes in the first season and directing the episode "Which Side Are You On?. The episode introduces Jeannie Berlin in a recurring role as Cyd Peach, the hard-nosed head of Waystar's news outlet ATN.

The fictional company Vaulter has several parallels to real-world online media startups, and numerous critics pointed out how it functioned as a parody of popular news websites and gossip blogs. Vice was often cited as the most prominent basis for Vaulter by critics, and Vice News itself published an article by Drew Schwartz identifying various similarities between the culture of Vaulter depicted in the episode and Vice's own idiosyncrasies. These included a large neon sign bearing the company logo, framed photos of marijuana farms, and "unhinged headlines" like "Meet the World’s Richest People Trafficker (He’s a Surprisingly Nice Guy)." In the same piece, Schwartz also compared Vaulter to Gawker, for its similarly strained relationship with its parent company; and BuzzFeed, also for the comically exaggerated headlines.

Austen Goslin of Polygon compared Vaulter's attempted "pivot to video" to the real-life fad of video-based content that companies like Facebook, Vice, and Mashable once saw as a major profit generator. Goslin particularly emphasized the similarity between Vaulter and Mic, which made a failed gambit on the profitability of video journalism in 2017 and ultimately sold for far less than its once-soaring valuation. Mic also performed mass layoffs of its staff during its downfall, similar to Kendall's firing of Vaulter's employees at the end of the episode; additionally, its founder partially attributed the company's failure to Facebook's algorithms, which the character Lawrence Yee blames for Vaulter's low readership in the episode. The name "Vaulter" was also compared to New York Magazine's entertainment-based subsidiary Vulture.

=== Filming ===
Scenes at the Vaulter offices were filmed at the Holland Plaza Building in Hudson Square. Six Flags Great Escape in Queensbury, New York stood in for the Brightstar theme park where Kendall celebrates his daughter's birthday at the beginning of the episode. Scenes at the apartment given to Greg by Kendall were filmed in the Cast Iron House, a luxury condo located on 67 Franklin Street in Tribeca.

== Reception ==
=== Ratings ===
Upon airing, the episode was watched by 0.603 million viewers, with an 18-49 rating of 0.16.

=== Critical reception ===
"Vaulter" received critical acclaim, with reviewers praising the performances, writing, and the depiction of Vaulter, which was frequently described as a satire of prominent online news websites and culture blogs. On Rotten Tomatoes, the episode has a rating of 94% based on 18 reviews, with the critics' consensus stating, "Along with the disastrous downfall of a new media company, Jeremy Strong's performance as the downtrodden Kendall Roy takes "Vaulter" to the next level."

Randall Colburn of The A.V. Club gave the episode an A−, praising Kendall's character development and remarking on the "painful" parallels between the Vaulter storyline and the historically tense relationship between real-life news companies and unions, including The A.V. Club and its parent company G/O Media. Colburn remarked that "as painful as it is to watch, [the episode] nevertheless reflects the ruthlessness of our monopolized economic climate, and continues the series’ exploration of how the pettiness and interpersonal drama of the 1% drips down to the working class and, in this instance, journalism." Winston Cook-Wilson of Spin called "Vaulter" one of the series' best episodes to date, remarking that the episode mixed "a nuanced take on one of America’s most doomed industries with its typical air of high melodrama" and finding the scene in which Kendall discourages Vaulter's employees from unionizing to be "harrowing." Cook-Wilson found numerous similarities between the shutdown of Vaulter and the downfall of real-world news companies after acquisition, which also included the controversial leadership of G/O Media under Jim Spanfeller. Scott Tobias of Vulture gave the episode a full five stars, saying that the series gets its depiction of a modern online news company "excruciatingly right." Tobias praised the episode's emotionally resonant depiction of Kendall's deteriorating resolve, and described Jeannie Berlin's guest appearance as an "absolute treat." Noel Murray of The New York Times praised Matthew Macfadyen's performance in the episode, saying that the episode featured some of the actor's best scenes in the series. Murray also praised Nicholas Braun for his delivery of Greg's many comic moments in the episode.
