= Hunting (Succession) =

- Succession episode
- Episode no.: Season 2 Episode 3
- Directed by: Andrij Parekh
- Written by: Tony Roche
- Original air date: August 25, 2019
- Running time: 64 minutes

Guest appearances
- Jeannie Berlin as Cyd Peach; Danny Huston as Jamie Laird; Jessica Hecht as Michelle Pantsil; Justine Lupe as Willa; Caitlin FitzGerald as Tabitha; David Rasche as Karl; Patch Darragh as Ray; Scott Nicholson as Colin; Juliana Canfield as Jess Jordan

Episode chronology
← Previous "Vaulter"	Next → "Safe Room"
- Succession season 2

"Hunting" is the third episode of the second season of the American satirical comedy-drama television series Succession, and the 13th episode overall. It was written by Tony Roche and directed by Andrij Parekh, and originally aired on HBO on August 25, 2019.

In the episode, the Roys go on a hunting trip in Hungary, but conflict erupts over Logan's controversial plan to acquire a rival news corporation. The episode became notable for "Boar on the Floor", a fictional hazing game that is depicted during the climax.

== Plot ==
Greg meets with author Michelle Pantsil, who is writing an unauthorized biography on Logan, but abruptly leaves when he realizes he is being recorded. Logan, whose health remains under question, announces to his senior executives that Waystar will be taking over rival media giant Pierce Global Media (PGM) and shuts down the members who disagree with the idea. Logan also decides to bring Frank back to the company, seeing as he is personal friends with PGM owner Nan Pierce.

Roman and Tabitha watch Connor's presidential campaign announcement, which he is running on an anti-tax platform. Roman asks Tabitha to reach out to PGM board member Naomi Pierce, her friend and past sexual fling, to broach the idea of an acquisition. Shiv, who knows of Logan's acquisition plans thanks to Gerri and staunchly opposes it, asks Tom to talk Logan out of it at the family's upcoming hunting retreat in Hungary.

On the plane, Logan is furious to learn that someone within the company spoke to Pantsil; Greg becomes nervous about being found out. They reunite with Frank after arriving at their hunting lodge in Hungary; Logan gives Frank the gift of a Rolex inscribed with a quote from "Ulysses" by Tennyson. Back in New York, Shiv tries to convince Connor not to run for president, given that his anti-tax platform jeopardizes Logan's political relationships. She accompanies Willa for drinks and seduces one of the actors in Willa's planned stage play. Connor, against the advice of his family, releases his campaign video to the public.

While hunting, Greg confides to Tom that he spoke to Pantsil and begs Tom to keep his secret. Kendall and Roman discuss having been contacted by Pantsil themselves; Roman discreetly takes a private call from Naomi Pierce. During dinner arrangements, Logan is further infuriated when he learns that the Pierces already know about his acquisition plans, realizing that the information leaks are coming from someone in his inner circle.

As everyone begins to eat, Logan cuts off the dinner and begins individually interrogating various members of the group to find out who talked to the Pierce family and Pantsil. Logan has Karl, Tom and Greg sit in the corner of the room and subjects them to a viciously humiliating game he calls "Boar on the Floor," having the three of them play-act like pigs and fight over a piece of sausage, with the loser being declared the mole. Amidst the chaos, Kendall wrestles Roman's phone away from him and learns that it was in fact Roman who talked to the Pierces. Roman claims he was trying to help his father, but Logan brands him a "moron" in front of everyone, and demands to know who in the room backs him on the acquisition. Kendall observes that everyone present is opposed, but Logan insists that he will nonetheless see his plan through.

During breakfast the next morning, Logan finds out that Mo, a recently deceased member of the board, talked to Pantsil and considers the issue resolved, to Greg's relief. Gerri approaches a despondent Roman, who asks her how he can earn his father's respect; Gerri recommends that he take Waystar's six-week management training course. On the plane back to New York, Frank informs Logan that PGM's CEO is interested in a meeting. That night, Logan calls Shiv telling her it is time to bring her into the company.

== Production ==
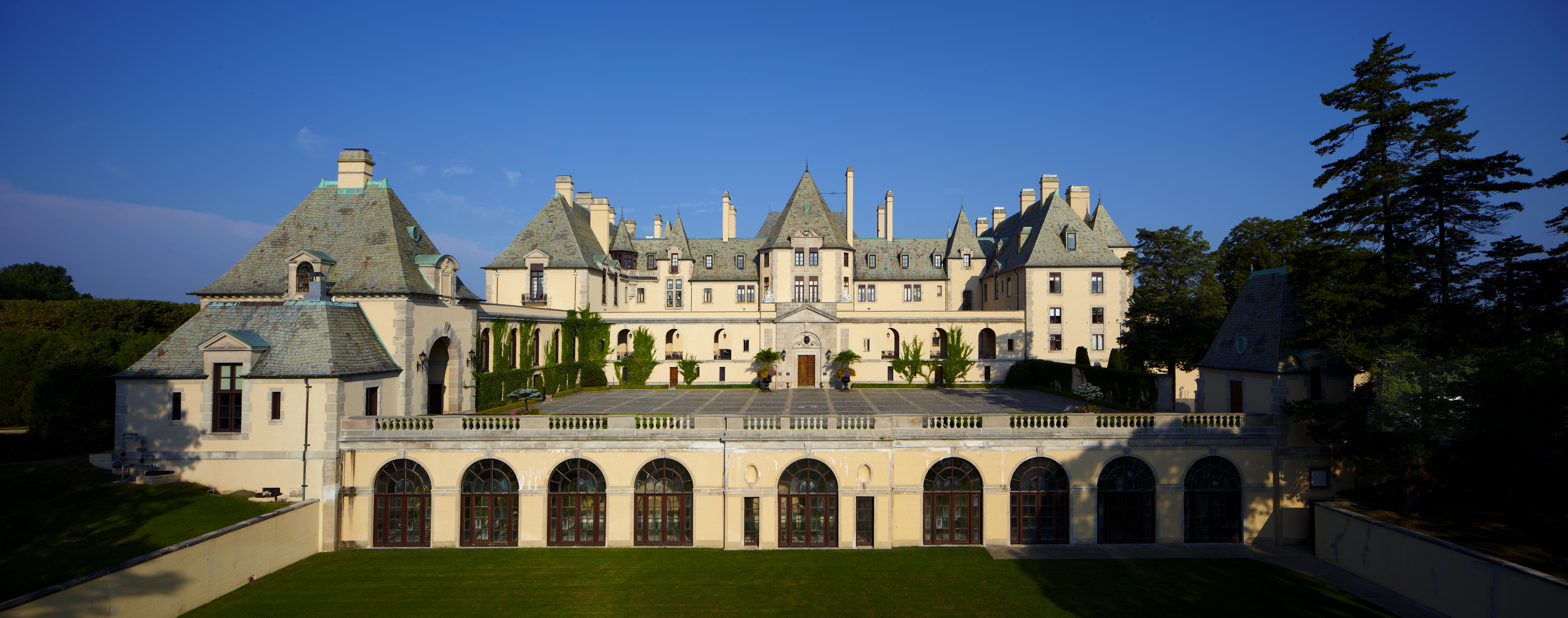
The episode was filmed at Oheka Castle, which stood in for a Hungarian retreat.

"Hunting" was written by Tony Roche, who had previously worked with Succession showrunner Jesse Armstrong as a writer on the series The Thick of It, Veep, and Fresh Meat, and the film In the Loop. It was directed by Andrij Parekh, in his third episode for the series; Parekh, typically a cinematographer, served as the series' director of photography during the early episodes of the first season. Oheka Castle in Huntington, New York stood in for the Roys' hunting lodge in Hungary. Armstrong said the decision to set the episode in Hungary was inspired by Joseph Stalin's dinner parties, where he would frequently play cruel jokes on his close associates.

=== "Boar on the Floor" ===
The episode's most widely noted sequence depicts "Boar on the Floor," a sadistic game Logan plays to root out the source of a leak in his company. Roche said that the scene was an effort to "explore how poisonous an influence Logan is on his friends and family, as well as on the world." Armstrong named several real-life influences for the "extraordinary and extreme" nature of the way internal corporate conflicts were handled in the episode, including Sumner Redstone, Ghislaine Maxwell and Rupert Murdoch. Parekh drew inspiration from the Stanford prison experiment, which the director felt shed insight on "how people settle in a habit, and they allow themselves to do things that they would otherwise never do." Parekh noted that certain parts of the scene, such as the actors crawling on their hands and knees, were not originally in the script, and that he had to take care to minimize the amount of discomfort among the actors in filming the "awful" and "gruesome" scene. Parekh added that his intent in filming the scenes where Logan intimidates individual members of his circle was to evoke "the feeling of being called on in the fourth or fifth grade [by] your teacher." Actor David Rasche, who plays Karl, remarked on the immediate popularity of "Boar on the Floor" among viewers, including his son, who played the game with his friends.

== Reception ==
=== Ratings ===
Upon airing, the episode was watched by 0.607 million viewers, with an 18-49 rating of 0.16.

=== Critical reception ===
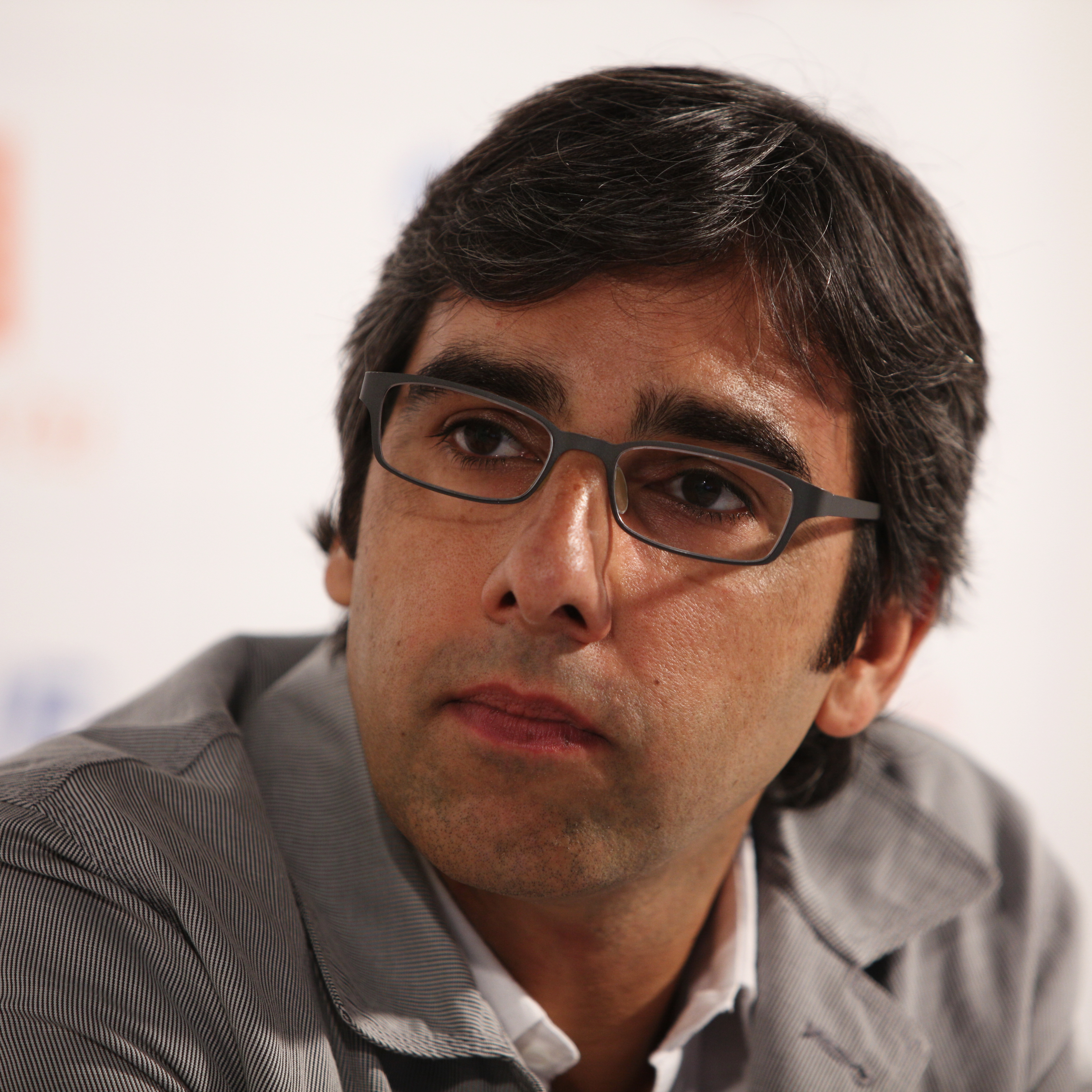
Andrij Parekh won the Primetime Emmy Award for Outstanding Directing for a Drama Series for his work on "Hunting".

"Hunting" was acclaimed by critics, who praised the writing, direction and performances (especially Cox), particularly during the "Boar on the Floor" sequence. On Rotten Tomatoes, the episode has a rating of 94% based on 18 reviews, with the critics' consensus stating, "Delightfully bizarre and downright vicious, Logan Roy taps into his inner mad king as he maliciously debases his executives in 'Hunting.'"

Spencer Kornhaber of The Atlantic praised the writers' ability at capturing the "fumbling, pseudo-jocular, not-all-that-witty way that real people actually talk," and noted how the script helped underscore the "culture of fear" inherent to the workings of Waystar RoyCo. Kornhaber compared the episode's climax to the dinner party scene in the 2017 film The Square in the way fear and humiliation "[morph] professionals into pigs" and how "the hooting and jeering from onlookers is a clear demonstration of how easily civilization can collapse into something more animalistic." Randall Colburn of The A.V. Club gave the episode an A−, saying "every moment in this episode is either important or hilarious. As such, it was very, very hard to write about." Colburn described the episode's climax as "bloodthirsty and animalistic," and remarked on Logan's "Trumpian" tendency to "readjust the goalposts every chance [he gets]." Colburn also praised the subplot involving Roman, and praised the performances of Kieran Culkin and Peter Friedman. Scott Tobias of Vulture gave the episode a full five stars, interpreting "Boar on the Floor" as a punishment for "collective disloyalty," and also found parallels to the Trump family in the imagery of "the ultrawealthy hovering over endangered animals," which he called "stock villainy." Vox praised Sarah Snook's performance in the subplot involving Shiv, and praised the way the climax of the episode depicted the "sheer control" that a man like Logan can have over even thirteen other people at once.

=== Accolades ===
At the 72nd Primetime Emmy Awards, Andrij Parekh won the award for Outstanding Directing for a Drama Series for his work on "Hunting," and Brian Cox submitted the episode to support his nomination for Outstanding Lead Actor in a Drama Series.
