= Dundee (Succession) =

- Succession episode
- Episode no.: Season 2 Episode 8
- Directed by: Kevin Bray
- Written by: Mary Laws
- Original air date: September 29, 2019
- Running time: 65 minutes

Guest appearances
- Holly Hunter as Rhea Jarrell; James Cromwell as Ewan Roy; Fisher Stevens as Hugo Baker; Danny Huston as Jamie Laird; Jeannie Berlin as Cyd Peach; Justine Lupe as Willa; Caitlin FitzGerald as Tabitha; David Rasche as Karl; Babak Tafti as Eduard Asgarov; Sydney Lemmon as Jennifer; Scott Nicholson as Colin

Episode chronology
← Previous "Return"	Next → "DC"

"Dundee" is the eighth episode of the second season of American satirical comedy-drama television series Succession, and the 18th episode overall. It was written by Mary Laws and directed by Kevin Bray, and originally aired on HBO on September 29, 2019.

In the episode, the Roys travel to Dundee, Scotland, Logan's birthplace, to celebrate his 50th anniversary as CEO of Waystar RoyCo.

== Plot ==
The Roys attend the premiere of Willa's play, and Kendall seduces Jennifer, one of the actresses. The next day, the Roy children record video messages for Waystar's 50th anniversary, which will be celebrated in Logan's hometown of Dundee, Scotland. On the plane to Scotland, the Roys learn that a disgruntled former employee is planning to blow the whistle on the cruises scandal.

In Dundee, Shiv confronts Rhea, accusing her of trying to take over the company. While Logan is away, Marcia passive-aggressively indicates to Rhea that she knows of her affair with Logan. During a family meeting, Shiv enlists the aid of her siblings to sabotage Rhea by making her look bad to Logan. Kendall, meanwhile, has Jennifer flown out to Dundee, despite Connor's protests that Willa needs her in New York for her play.

While touring the newly dedicated Logan Roy School of Journalism, Kendall admits to Rhea that he isn't genuinely working against her. Rhea suggests that Kendall is Logan's most likely successor. Ewan arrives in Dundee and gives Greg an ultimatum: either quit working for Logan, or lose Ewan's $250 million inheritance. Shiv struggles to convince her brothers to work with her against Rhea.

Rhea has arranged an elaborate gala celebrating Logan's 50 years at the company, surprising Logan with a crowd of hundreds of guests. Logan and Shiv agree to a "truce" for the night. Shiv meets with Gerri, Hugo, Cyd, Frank, and Karolina, who inform her that the whistleblower will not accept a cash settlement of any amount to withdraw his statement. Shiv decides not to concern her father with the details of the scandal during his celebration.

During the night's events, Kendall goes on stage, reveals a custom "Roy 50" baseball jersey, and performs a full rap song about Logan's prowess and achievements, leaving most of the crowd flabbergasted and Logan himself in a state of muted fury. He later has Jennifer sent home after she comes across as awkward and shallow when he introduces her to Logan. Roman and Eduard Asgarov tell Logan they have purchased him the Hearts football club as a gift, only to be reminded that Logan in fact supports their rival Hibs. Shiv realizes that Rhea will have to bear the brunt of the cruises scandal if she becomes CEO and tells Logan to make the decision he feels is best. Logan makes a speech announcing that Rhea will be CEO. Marcia, feeling betrayed that Logan did not tell her beforehand, leaves the event. As Logan prepares to unveil his plaque commemorating his 50 years at the company, Ewan confronts his brother, warning him that he will face a reckoning for his actions, before Logan finds the plaque has been dedicated to their mother rather than himself.

== Production ==
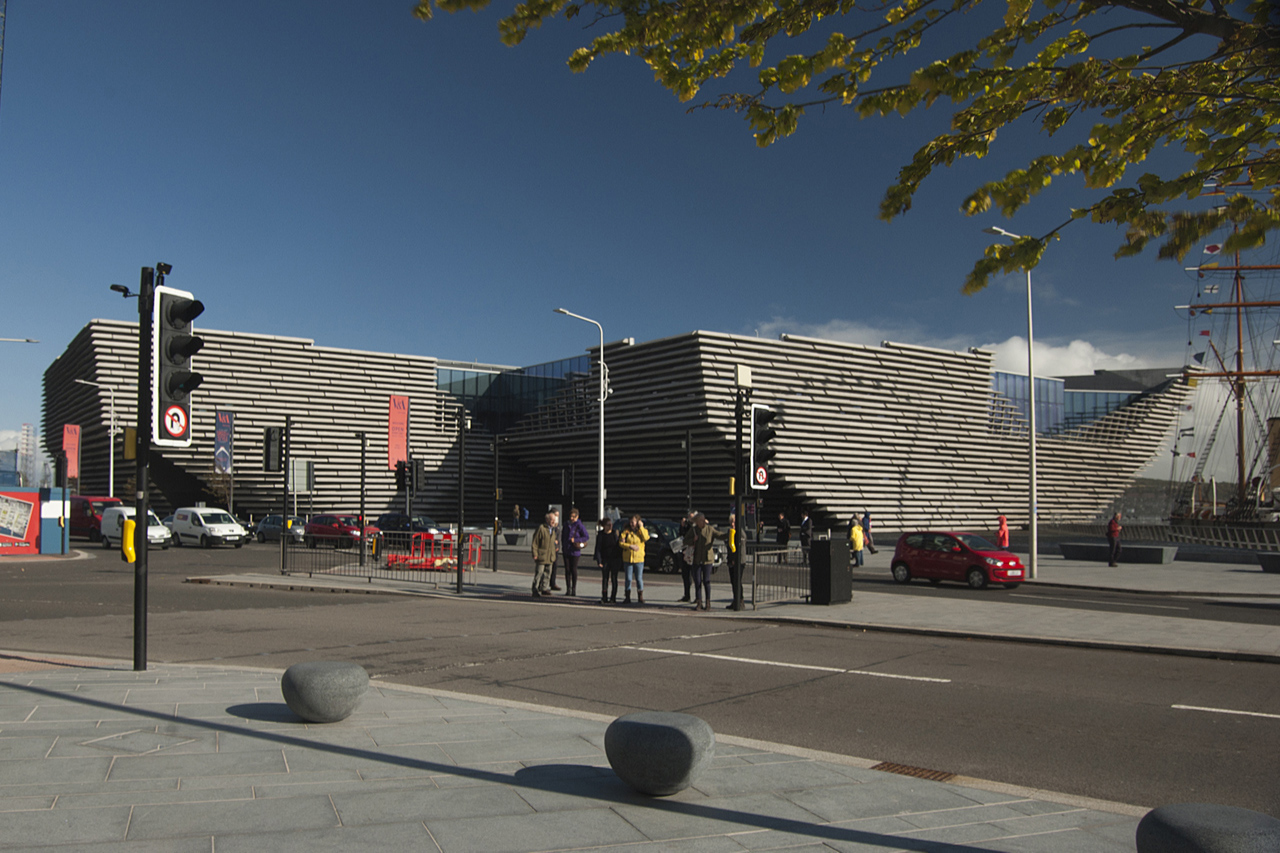
Some of the episode's scenes were filmed at the V&A Dundee.

The episode was filmed on location in Dundee, and some scenes take place in the newly-opened V&A Dundee. The production received £400,000 in public money from Screen Scotland for filming portions of "Dundee" and the previous episode, "Return", in Dundee and other Scottish locations. On an episode of Jimmy Kimmel Live!, actor Brian Cox revealed that the decision to make Logan's birthplace Dundee—Cox's real-life hometown—was made late in the production of the first season as a "surprise" from showrunner Jesse Armstrong, after Cox had already completed filming most of the episodes.

On the scene where Kendall raps, actor Jeremy Strong felt it was important for the story that he should not be terrible at rapping. “We did a table read in Glasgow, where we were shooting, and in the script Jesse [Armstrong] had just written: ‘Kendall does a rap.’" Strong thought that the line was "corny," and that they should do something more thought out, to which Armstrong agreed. Armstrong showed Strong a video of oil heir Mike Hess rapping at his 30th birthday party with Nelly as inspiration. Armstrong thought that he should be "committed" and "earnest". They asked show composer's Nicholas Britell to come up with a beat and write the lyrics, Strong would later wander around Glasgow with his headphones on, practicing. “To be honest, I remember waking up that day and just not knowing what was going to come out of me, and if I’d be able to do it or pull it off.” he recalled. The baseball shirt that Kendall wears while performing, was Strong’s idea, he sketched it out on a piece of paper after studying videos of rappers to work out what to do with his hands. Kendall's rap, "L to the OG", was released as a single on May 20, 2020.

== Reception ==
=== Ratings ===
Upon airing, the episode was watched by 0.579 million viewers, with an 18-49 rating of 0.11.

=== Critical reception ===
"Dundee" received critical acclaim. On Rotten Tomatoes, the episode has a rating of 94% based on 17 reviews, with the critics' consensus stating, "With Kendall's cringe-worthy rap performance, the battle of wits between Rhea and Shiv, and Logan's reluctant return to his hometown, "Dundee" makes for a sublimely exciting episode."

Randall Colburn of The A.V. Club, gave the episode a B+, praising the piecemeal, ambiguous way in which the series provides details on Logan's past: "There’s no flashback episode, no ready-made narrative about absent fathers, loving mothers, and persevering beyond abuse. Instead, details of Logan’s past bob up as they do in his mind, only to be shoved back down into the dark corners he leaves unswept." Colburn also praised Kendall's rap as "a weird, humanizing moment of total lameness for all of these rich, untouchable people." Scott Tobias of Vulture gave the episode 4 stars out of 5, comparing Kendall's rap to Karl Rove's comedic rap performance at a 2007 radio and television correspondents' dinner. Tobias also remarked on the "mythological" nature of Logan's characterization in the episode, and praised the subplot involving Connor and Willa's play. Vox praised Sarah Snook's performance in depicting Shiv becoming both "sharper and stupider" as her conflict with Rhea became more pronounced, and favorably compared the episode to the previous week's "Return".

=== Accolades ===
For the episode, James Cromwell received a nomination for Outstanding Guest Actor in a Drama Series at the 72nd Primetime Emmy Awards.
