= DC (Succession) =

- Succession episode
- Episode no.: Season 2 Episode 9
- Directed by: Mark Mylod
- Written by: Jesse Armstrong
- Original air date: October 6, 2019
- Running time: 65 minutes

Guest appearances
- Holly Hunter as Rhea Jarrell; Eric Bogosian as Gil Eavis; Danny Huston as Jamie Laird; Fisher Stevens as Hugo Baker; Annabelle Dexter-Jones as Naomi Pierce; David Rasche as Karl; Scott Nicholson as Colin; Babak Tafti as Eduard Asgarov; Ashley Zukerman as Nate Sofrelli; Mark Blum as Bill Lockheart; Juliana Canfield as Jess Jordan; Victor Slezak as Senator Roberts; Sally Murphy as Kira; Zoë Winters as Kerry; Anthony Arkin as James Weissel; Ekin Koç as Kadir; Selim Bayraktar as Zeynal

Episode chronology
← Previous "Dundee"	Next → "This Is Not for Tears"

"DC" is the ninth and penultimate episode of the second season of the American satirical comedy-drama television series Succession, and the 19th episode overall. It was written by series showrunner Jesse Armstrong and directed by Mark Mylod, and originally aired on HBO on October 6, 2019.

In the episode, some members of the Roy family are compelled to testify in Washington, D.C. before the Senate regarding allegations of sexual misconduct on their company's cruise line, bringing a subplot that began early in the first season to the forefront.

== Plot ==
At Logan's apartment, the Roys watch a televised interview with James Weissel, the whistleblower in the Brightstar Cruises sexual misconduct scandal. Weissel names the late Lester McClintock personally responsible for most of the misconduct, with Lester being nicknamed "Mo" by higher-ups as a short version of "Mo Lester" (molester). He also implicates Tom, Kendall, and Gerri in helping cover it up. The interview discusses what the company referred to as NRPI (No Real Person Involved) cases, in which the victims were sex workers or migrant workers at foreign ports, which the company used to clear itself of any legal liability. The family learns from Shiv that the Senate wants senior company officials, including Logan, to testify at a hearing pertaining to the scandal. Roman agrees to Logan's request to help the company survive financially by securing funding from the family of Azerbaijani billionaire Eduard Asgarov. Rhea arrives shortly thereafter to aid in preparations for the testimony, and privately relays to Logan that she feels manipulated at being named CEO just as the company is weathering a major scandal.

The Roys plan to use Tom's predecessor Bill Lockheart (who initially oversaw the cruises cover-up) as a scapegoat, but are surprised to find him in the Senate building when they arrive. Bill implies that he is there to ensure his own survival of the scandal. Logan, Kendall, and the others strategize from within a boardroom while Tom is the first to be called to testify alongside Gerri. Tom thoroughly flubs his responses to Senator Gil Eavis' aggressive questioning, at one point even claiming not to know who Greg is. He returns from his testimony in a panic, accusing Shiv and the others of using him as their patsy.

Meanwhile, Roman travels with Karl and Laird to consult Eduard's help. He and Eduard half-heartedly continue their duties as owners of Scotland's Heart of Midlothian football team, (Note: As depicted in "Dundee", Roman purchased the team to impress Logan without realizing that Logan supports the team's rivals Hibernian.) and Eduard invites Roman and the others to Turkey to make their investment proposal to Eduard's father. In Turkey, as Roman is in the middle of a sales pitch, he and the others are ushered into a hotel lobby by anti-corruption militia forces, who Eduard says were sent by the Turkish president's son-in-law Zeynal to seize key assets. The forces hold the hotel occupants hostage while Roman manages to secure something of an agreement with Eduard and his associates. He is later taken to meet with Zeynal face-to-face.

Shiv privately meets with Gil and Nate, where she learns that they have a witness named Kira, who is ready to testify against the Roys. Logan sends Shiv and Rhea to meet with Kira while he and Kendall take the stand. Logan also stumbles through his responses to Eavis' questions, but deflects the blame onto Kendall, who nonetheless provides a strong and confident rebuke to Eavis and accuses him of operating on personal bias against Logan and his company.

Shiv and Rhea track down Kira to a playground where she is with her children. Rhea is uncomfortable coercing a sexual assault victim into silence, so Shiv meets with Kira alone. Shiv admits to Kira that she and the company cannot be trusted, but asks her whether her personal courage in coming out as a witness against the Roys is worth the lifetime of public scrutiny that will follow her if she chooses to go through with it. She offers Kira a hefty settlement and a promise that she will work to seek justice for those involved. Kira agrees to back down, and Shiv wins the approval of her father.

After the hearings, Rhea feels blindsided by the scandal and tells Logan she no longer wants to be associated with the company, abdicating her role as CEO before walking away. Logan watches Kendall's testimony with Shiv and worries that Kendall's combative stance against Congress will hurt Waystar's relationship with its shareholders. He tells Shiv that if they really want the company to survive, they will need to make a "blood sacrifice".

== Production ==
"DC" was written by Succession showrunner Jesse Armstrong and directed by Mark Mylod in his seventh episode for the series. For the scenes in Congress, the production crew built a replica of a Senate chamber at a studio in Queens. To prepare for his scenes during Tom's testimony, Matthew Macfadyen watched the House testimony of then-president Donald Trump's former attorney Michael Cohen and his questioning by Elijah Cummings.

== Reception ==
=== Ratings ===
Upon airing, the episode was watched by 0.705 million viewers, with an 18-49 rating of 0.15.

=== Critical reception ===
"DC" was critically acclaimed, with reviewers praising the writing, performances, and culmination of the cruises storyline that had begun in the first season. On Rotten Tomatoes, the episode has a rating of 100% based on 15 reviews, with the critics' consensus stating, "Disturbingly daunting, and thoroughly engrossing, the Roy family pulls out all the stops as they prevent Congress from destroying their company."

Randall Colburn of The A.V. Club gave the episode an A−, praising the comedy of Tom's testimony and Matthew Macfadyen's performance as "genuinely distressing". Colburn also praised the major scene involving Shiv's meeting with the sexual assault victim, as well as Brian Cox's "brutal, incredible delivery" during the final scene with Rhea. Scott Tobias of Vulture gave the episode a full five stars, praising the "brilliant" writing of the scenes where the Roys assess the extent of the damage done to them by the scandal, and compared the meeting between Shiv and Kira to the real-life case of Christine Blasey Ford and her sexual assault allegations against then-nominee to the Supreme Court Brett Kavanaugh. Tobias also praised how the "darker, more serious tone" of the episode helped underscore the fundamentally "rotten" quality of the Roys. Noel Murray of The New York Times praised the episode as "gripping, but also illuminating" in the way it explored how the wealthy come up with various machinations to avoid accountability. Vox called "DC" a "terrific" episode, praising writer Jesse Armstrong for drawing humor from "cringe-inducing" moments. The review considered the episode to be one in which "absolutely everybody loses, and on Succession that's a truly delicious proposition."
