= The Summer Palace (Succession) =

- Succession episode
- Episode no.: Season 2 Episode 1
- Directed by: Mark Mylod
- Written by: Jesse Armstrong
- Original air date: August 11, 2019
- Running time: 65 minutes

Guest appearances
- Danny Huston as Jamie Laird; Justine Lupe as Willa; Larry Pine as Sandy Furness; David Rasche as Karl; Ingvar Eggert Sigurðsson as Ragnar Magnusson; Scott Nicholson as Colin

Episode chronology
← Previous "Nobody Is Ever Missing"	Next → "Vaulter"
- Succession season 2

"The Summer Palace" is the second-season premiere of the American satirical comedy-drama television series Succession, and the 11th episode overall. It was written by series creator Jesse Armstrong and directed by Mark Mylod, and originally aired on HBO on August 11, 2019.

The episode picks up two days after the end of the first season, and sees a traumatized Kendall trying to make amends with his father while backtracking on his attempted takeover of the company. Logan begins to consider naming his successor.

== Plot ==
Shortly after Shiv and Tom's wedding, Kendall is in a rehab clinic in Iceland, but is called away within 48 hours of his stay to give a public statement regarding his decision to back down from his hostile takeover of Waystar RoyCo. Still traumatized and disoriented after the fatal car crash in England, Kendall struggles to offer a coherent response, but Karolina instructs him to simply say, "I saw their plan, and my dad's plan was better."

The Roy siblings, who are unaware of Kendall's accident and still feel betrayed by his takeover attempt, watch his interview with confusion at his strange appearance. Shiv and Tom watch from a yacht where they are spending their honeymoon, which they decide to cut short so they can attend to family matters (including Tom's new role in the company). Roman and Gerri, meanwhile, watch the statement from a Japanese hospital, where they are visiting those injured in the explosion that occurred during the botched satellite launch that Roman oversaw. Roman evades most questions during a press conference regarding the incident.

Kendall returns to New York and sits down with Logan and Karl in Waystar's offices to assess the extent of Stewy and Sandy's threat. Kendall privately confides to Logan some of the personal information he revealed to Stewy and Sandy that attested to his father's erratic behavior. Logan later has dinner with his financial adviser Jamie Laird, who suggests that he sell the company to avoid a costly legal battle. If he continues to fight the deal, Logan is encouraged to name a successor to appease the company's shareholders. That night, Greg comes to Kendall's temporary new apartment to deliver him cocaine.

The following day, Kendall arrives early to lunch at the family's summer home in the Hamptons, where the house is filled with an unidentified foul odor. Colin, the head of Logan's security detail, takes Kendall aside to inform him that he is not a suspect in the police investigation into Andrew "Doddy" Dodds' death. The other children arrive, and the source of the stench is discovered to be a bag of dead raccoons stuffed in the chimney. Logan has the prepared meal discarded and orders pizza, and asks his children for their opinion on whether he should sell the company. However, none of them find themselves able to speak freely in front of the entire family.

Logan excuses himself to his office and has the Roy children meet him one by one behind closed doors, starting with Roman. Shiv is called in next, where Logan tells her that he has chosen her as his successor. Shiv is taken aback by the offer and admits she has always wanted the opportunity. The two agree to not disclose the plan until Shiv is installed in the company, and she does not inform Tom, telling him only that he has been named the Chair of Global Broadcast News at ATN.

At dusk, Logan confronts the contractor who was in charge of recent repairs to the summer home, accusing him of placing the dead raccoons in the chimney as retaliation for being underpaid. Logan gives the contractor an even smaller sum of money, knowing he would win any resultant legal challenge. During dinner, Logan names Kendall and Roman as his co-COOs, despite the latter's protests. He also selects Gerri as his nominal successor, while making it clear that she will not actually inherit the company. He then takes Kendall to meet with Stewy and Sandy in Manhattan, but sends Kendall in alone. Stewy is both incensed and bewildered by Kendall's betrayal, and Sandy refuses to come to a compromise, which makes a strenuous legal battle their only option. Kendall promises them that they will lose.

== Production ==
"The Summer Palace" was written by Succession showrunner Jesse Armstrong and directed by Mark Mylod in his fifth episode for the series. For season 2, actors J. Smith-Cameron (Gerri), Arian Moayed (Stewy), and Dagmara Domińczyk (Karolina) were promoted to series regulars and received credit in the opening titles. The episode introduces Danny Huston in a recurring role as Jamie Laird, Logan's financial adviser.

The episode's opening scenes at Kendall's rehab clinic were shot on location in Iceland. Henry Ford II's 1960 estate in the Hamptons was used as the Roys' summer home. Production designer Stephen Carter remarked that the location was chosen to reflect Logan's sensibilities: "Given the age of the character, he would have been forming his impressions of what trendy style would be in the sixties." The production retrofitted new artwork and furniture in five of the home's rooms to create the set. Kendall's meeting with Stewy and Sandy at the end of the episode was filmed at Del Posto, a revered Italian restaurant on 10th Avenue in Manhattan.

== Reception ==
=== Ratings ===
Upon airing, the episode was watched by 0.612 million viewers, with an 18–49 rating of 0.18.

=== Critical reception ===
"The Summer Palace" received critical acclaim, with many reviewers praising the introduction of Shiv as a potential successor to Logan. On Rotten Tomatoes, the episode has a rating of 94% based on 17 reviews, with the critics' consensus stating, "Fast-paced, savage, and surprisingly tragic, the one percent continues to commit unspeakable atrocities to one another in the entertaining "The Summer Palace.""

Randall Colburn of The A.V. Club gave the episode a B+, praising the developments to Kendall's character arc despite previously believing his story to be concluded in the first season. Colburn called Sarah Snook a "reservoir of restrained exuberance" in her performance during the negotiation between Logan and Shiv. Scott Tobias of Vulture gave the episode a full five stars, comparing Kendall's sudden subservience to The Manchurian Candidate and praising writer Armstrong for mining the "tragicomedy" of the situation. Emily VanDerWerff of Vox called the Shiv storyline a "delicious" setup for the rest of the season, and praised Kieran Culkin's ability to add "unusual physicality to all of his scenes." VanDerWerff also found parallels between Roman's idea of downscaling the family business to the real-world budget cuts at the Fox Corporation.

=== Accolades ===
Sarah Snook submitted this episode to support her nomination for Outstanding Supporting Actress in a Drama Series at the 72nd Primetime Emmy Awards.
