= Andrij Parekh =

American cinematographer and television director

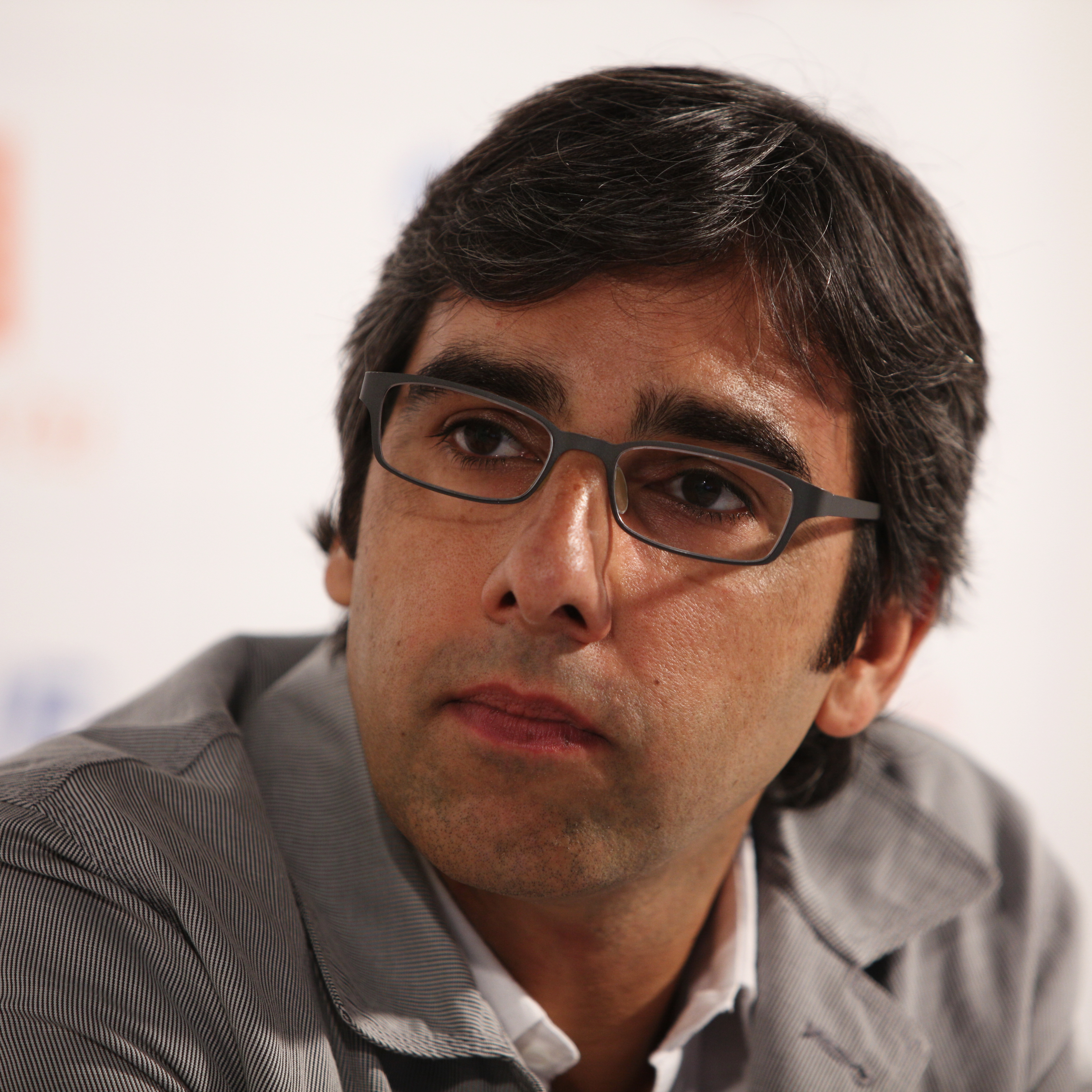
- Parekh at 44th KVIFF
- Born: September 20, 1971 (age 54); Cambridge, Massachusetts, U.S.
- Education: Carleton College (BA); New York University (MFA)
- Spouse: Sophie Barthes

Andrij Parekh (born September 20, 1971) is an American cinematographer and television director.

== Early life ==
Parekh was born in Cambridge, Massachusetts of Ukrainian and Indian descent. Parekh went to high school in Minnesota at The Blake School and attended Carleton College, where he graduated in 1995 with a degree in sociology/anthropology and a minor in media studies. He went on to study cinematography at NYU's Tisch School of the Arts (MFA, 2001) and the FAMU film school in Prague. While at NYU, he was nominated for the 1998 Eastman Excellence in Cinematography award. In 2001, he won an honorable mention from the American Society of Cinematographers in the "Heritage Award" category.

== Career ==
He currently lives and works in New York City, shooting features and music videos, including work for artists such as MGMT (Electric Feel) or The Killers (Spaceman). In 2004 he was named one of Filmmaker Magazine's "25 New Faces of Indie Film"and was included as one of Variety's "Ten Cinematographers to Watch." Recently, he was invited to join the American Society of Cinematographers.

On September 20, 2020, at the 72nd Primetime Emmy Awards, he was announced as the winner of that year's Emmy for Outstanding Directing for a Drama Series for his work directing “Hunting”, an episode of that year's Outstanding Drama Series winner, Succession. More recently, he signed a deal with HBO.

== Filmography ==
=== Director ===
Television

Year	Title	Episode(s)
2018–2023	Succession	"Which Side Are You On?"
2018–2023	Succession	"Vaulter"
2018–2023	Succession	"Hunting"
2018–2023	Succession	"What it Takes"
2018–2023	Succession	"Kill List"
2018–2023	Succession	"America Decides"
2019	Watchmen	"If You Don't Like My Story, Write Your Own"
2020	Brave New World	"Monogamy & Futility" (Part 1 and Part 2)
2024–2026	House of the Dragon	"Smallfolk"
2024–2026	House of the Dragon	"The Treasons at Tumbleton"
2027	Superfakes	TBA

=== Cinematographer ===
==== Film ====
Year	Title	Director
2004	Speak	Jessica Sharzer
2004	Messengers	Philip Farha
2006	Half Nelson	Ryan Fleck
2006	The Treatment	Oren Rudavsky
2006	Fish Dreams	Kirill Mikhanovsky
2006	The Favor	Eva Aridjis
2007	Noise	Henry Bean
2008	Sugar	Anna Boden; Ryan Fleck
2008	August	Austin Chick
2008	The Toe Tactic	Emily Hubley
2009	Cold Souls (Note: Also credited as producer)	Sophie Barthes
2010	Blue Valentine	Derek Cianfrance
2010	It's Kind of a Funny Story	Anna Boden; Ryan Fleck
2011	Dark Horse	Todd Solondz
2012	Greetings from Tim Buckley	Daniel Algrant
2014	Madame Bovary	Sophie Barthes
2015	Mississippi Grind	Anna Boden; Ryan Fleck
2017	The Zookeeper's Wife	Niki Caro
2018	The Catcher Was a Spy	Ben Lewin
2021	Naked Singularity	Chase Palmer
2023	The Pod Generation	Sophie Barthes
2025	Roofman	Derek Cianfrance

==== Television ====
Year	Title	Director	Episodes
2017	13 Reasons Why	Tom McCarthy	"Tape 1 Side A"
2017	13 Reasons Why	Tom McCarthy	"Tape 1 Side B"
2018	Succession	Adam McKay	"Celebration"
2018	Succession	Mark Mylod	"Sh*t Show at the F**k Factory"
2018	Succession	Mark Mylod	"Lifeboats"

Miniseries

Year	Title	Director	Notes
2015	Show Me a Hero	Paul Haggis	
2019	Watchmen	Nicole Kassell	Episode "It's Summer and We're Running Out of Ice"
2021	Scenes from a Marriage	Hagai Levi	

== Awards and nominations ==
Year	Award	Category	Title	Result	Notes
2001	American Society of Cinematographers	Heritage Award - Honorable mention		Won	
2003	American Society of Cinematographers	Heritage Award - Honorable mention		Won	
2003	Camerimage	Golden Tadpole	Empty	Nominated	
2010	Independent Spirit Awards	Best Cinematography	Cold Souls	Nominated	
2019	Primetime Emmy Awards	Outstanding Directing for a Drama Series	Succession	Won	For episode "Hunting"
2023	Primetime Emmy Awards	Outstanding Directing for a Drama Series	Succession	Nominated	For episode "America Decides"
2021	Directors Guild of America	Outstanding Directing – Drama Series	Succession	Nominated	For episode "What It Takes"
2023	Directors Guild of America	Outstanding Directing – Drama Series	Succession	Nominated	For episode "America Decides"
