= America Decides =

- Succession episode
- Episode no.: Season 4 Episode 8
- Directed by: Andrij Parekh
- Written by: Jesse Armstrong
- Cinematography by: Katelin Arizmendi
- Original air date: May 14, 2023
- Running time: 66 minutes

Guest appearances
- Natalie Gold as Rava Roy; Ashley Zukerman as Nate Sofrelli; Justin Kirk as Jeryd Mencken; Adam Godley as Darwin Perry; Juliana Canfield as Jess Jordan; Mark Linn-Baker as Maxim Pierce; Scott Nicholson as Colin Stiles; Swayam Bhatia as Sophie Roy; Patch Darragh as Ray Kennedy; Brian Hotaling as Mark Rosenstock; Zack Robidas as Mark Ravenhead; Elliot Villar as Daniel Jiménez; Lori Wilner as Pam Thompson; Tom Nichols as Ben Stove

Episode chronology
← Previous "Tailgate Party"	Next → "Church and State"
- Succession season 4

"America Decides" is the eighth episode of the fourth season of the American satirical comedy-drama television series Succession, and the 37th episode overall. It was written by series creator Jesse Armstrong and directed by Andrij Parekh, and originally aired on HBO on May 14, 2023.

Succession centers on the Roy family, the owners of global media and entertainment conglomerate Waystar RoyCo, and their fight for control of the company amidst uncertainty about the health of the family's patriarch Logan (Brian Cox), who has passed away by this point of the series. The episode takes place on the night of the United States presidential election, a close call between far-right Republican Jeryd Mencken (Justin Kirk) and Democrat Daniel Jimenez (Elliot Villar). The uncertainty over the voting results throws Logan's four children in disarray over their own plans and alliances, in particular over Shiv (Sarah Snook)'s disgust of Mencken and Waystar's own political alignment with him.

The episode received critical acclaim, with praise for Armstrong's script, Parekh's direction and the performances of the cast. The episode received four Primetime Emmy Award nominations, including Outstanding Directing for a Drama Series for Parekh and Outstanding Supporting Actor in a Drama Series for Nicholas Braun; it also won the Art Directors Guild Award for Excellence in Production Design for a One-Hour Contemporary Single-Camera Series.

== Plot ==
The night of the presidential election, Tom braces himself to manage the ATN newsroom, using cocaine to help fight his sleep deprivation. Greg, who went out for drinks with Matsson and his team the previous night, tells Tom of Shiv and Matsson's covert alliance.

The siblings disagree about which candidate to support. Roman continues to back far-right Congressman Jeryd Mencken, who he knows will advance Waystar's agenda. (Note: As discussed in "What It Takes".) Shiv, still secretly aligned with Matsson and concerned about the threat Mencken represents to American democracy, backs Democrat Daniel Jiménez, who she believes will allow the GoJo deal to go through. Kendall receives a call from Rava, who reiterates her and Sophie's fear about the consequences of Mencken winning. (Note: Rava told Kendall in "Tailgate Party" that Sophie had experienced harassment from an ATN viewer.) He then calls Nate and unsuccessfully attempts to convince him and Jiménez to block the GoJo deal. Roman is summoned to meet face-to-face with Mencken, who asks him to frame the election as a victory for Mencken regardless of whether he actually wins the vote, promising Roman significant influence under his presidency.

A voting center in Milwaukee is set on fire, (Note: The episode implies that Mencken's supporters were responsible for the firebombing incident.) destroying thousands of ballots that likely would have gone to Jiménez given the county's liberal-majority electorate. Shiv reminds her siblings that the absentee ballots must be accounted for in order for the Wisconsin vote to be valid, but Roman attempts to use the situation to call the vote in Wisconsin early for Mencken. Shiv takes Tom aside and attempts to apologize for their fight the previous night, (Note: As seen in "Tailgate Party".) but the conversation quickly turns hostile; when Shiv reveals to him she is pregnant, Tom expresses skepticism, suspecting this is just another tactic to manipulate him. Roman allows ATN anchor Mark Ravenhead to accuse the Democrats of the firebombing, alarming Matsson. Shiv attempts to threaten Greg into silence about her collusion with Matsson.

Roman reports to Kendall that Mencken has promised to block the GoJo deal in exchange for ATN's support. ATN poll analyst Darwin Perry warns Roman and Tom that ATN could lose credibility by calling the vote in Wisconsin prematurely, but Roman ignores his concerns, and Tom suggests they make a "pending" call in Wisconsin for Mencken, with Darwin on air to explain the caveat. However, chaos ensues when Darwin accidentally gets wasabi in his eyes, preventing him from going on air; Tom then greenlights ATN to officially call Wisconsin for Mencken. Connor arrives at the newsroom, having decided to concede the race and support Mencken in exchange for being named the U.S. Ambassador to Slovenia. (Note: As he and Roman discussed in "Tailgate Party".) He gives a rambling yet headstrong concession speech, which is aired live on ATN.

Jiménez wins Michigan, placing both candidates at 262 electoral votes, with only Alaska and Arizona yet to be called. Darwin projects a win for Mencken in Arizona, but cautions against calling the election given the uncertainty in Wisconsin. Kendall takes Roman aside to express his qualms about endangering his family, while Roman continues to trivialize the political consequences in favor of his own self-interest. Torn between his family and business interests, Kendall confides his anxieties about failing his children to Shiv, who attempts to appeal to his sense of morality to sway him away from Mencken. Kendall asks Shiv to call Nate to inquire whether Jiménez is willing to block the GoJo sale, but Shiv merely pretends to make the call, and gives vague answers to her brothers about Jiménez's stance. Kendall learns the truth when he calls Jiménez's team himself and subsequently confirms with Greg that Shiv is working with Matsson.

Feeling hurt by his sister's betrayal, Kendall throws in his support for Mencken, ignoring Shiv's pleas to consider the danger Mencken poses to the American political system. Tom orders Greg to inform the newsroom of the decision to call the election for Mencken, and he hesitatingly obeys. ATN announces Mencken as the winner of the election, and PGN begins airing reports naming Tom responsible for prematurely calling the vote. Shiv calls Matsson to promise to undo the damage and bring down Waystar. On his way home, an ashamed Kendall calls Rava and asks to see his children. She refuses, leaving him to ponder his decision.

== Production ==
=== Writing ===
"America Decides" was written by Succession creator and showrunner Jesse Armstrong and directed by Andrij Parekh in his sixth episode for the series, and his second for the fourth season after "Kill List".

Armstrong named the 1960, 2000, and 2016 U.S. presidential elections - all historically close races - as points of inspiration for crafting the episode, aiming to illustrate the characters' "different political instincts [and] corporate interests colliding in this very direct way." Parekh recalled that the table read for the series' pilot episode was conducted on the day of Donald Trump's victory in the 2016 election, describing it as "a good place to start in terms of the reality check of it all" for "America Decides". Eric Schultz, the former Deputy White House Press Secretary who served as a political consultant for the series, recounted in an interview how the episode drew from the 2020 election in depicting various events. For example, Schultz described Mencken's Arizona win as an "inverse" of Fox News being the first network to call Arizona for Joe Biden, with the network then allegedly firing editor Chris Stirewalt for making the correct call. Several reviewers felt the episode echoed the lawsuit filed by Dominion Voting Systems against Fox News for claims about rigging the 2020 election in Biden's favor; Schultz asserted that the "arc of this episode was in place long before the most recent revelations", but praised the "extraordinarily diligent" writers for the narrative's prescience.

=== Filming ===
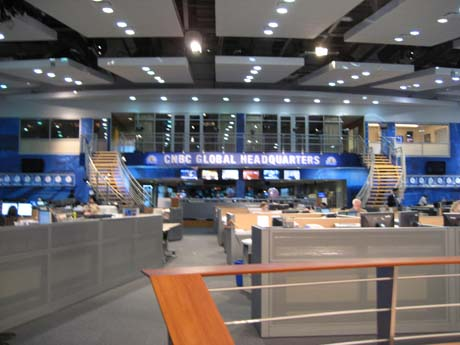
The episode was filmed inside CNBC's studios in New Jersey.

The episode was filmed over two weekends at CNBC's corporate headquarters in New Jersey, which stood in for the ATN offices. Parekh recounted the challenges imposed by the episode's production, between both the limited time permitted to film in CNBC's studios and the need to film "an evening's worth" of mock news programming for ATN, which was created by filmmaker and Succession co-producer Katrina Whalen.

Justin Kirk reprises his role as far-right presidential candidate Jeryd Mencken from the third season. The actor tested positive for COVID-19 two days prior to having to film Mencken's victory speech and lost his voice; the production then adjusted its schedule to accommodate Kirk's recovery, and he ultimately filmed the scene in front of a "sparse camera crew" in CNBC's offices. Additionally, Adam Godley guest stars in the episode as ATN pollster Darwin Perry, a character partially inspired by NBC News data analyst Steve Kornacki. In preparation for the role, Godley spoke with a CNN employee who consulted for the series on the particulars of working in a newsroom.

The episode features appearances by numerous real-life journalists as ATN anchors, such as Tom Nichols, Dave Briggs, David Kerley, Sharla McBride and Kelly Nash, the latter two having recurred on the series since the first two seasons. Nichols later recalled his experiences with filming in a column in The Atlantic, writing "I was “reporting” the show’s events with lines meant to imply racial animus, gravely agreeing with offensive, right-wing conspiracies, and it occurred to me how easy it was to fall into that persona."

== Reception ==
=== Critical reception ===
"America Decides" received critical acclaim, with reviewers praising Armstrong's script, Parekh's direction, the performances of the cast, and the episode's tension and dramatic weight. On the review aggregator Rotten Tomatoes, it holds an approval rating of 100% based on 17 reviews. The website's critical consensus states, "A nightmare countdown filled with so much dread that wasabi in the eyes proves welcome comedic relief, "America Decides" lays bare how poison can drip through a family and onto an entire nation."

William Hughes of The A.V. Club gave the episode an A, finding it timely in light of the Fox News-Dominion Voting Systems lawsuit. He described the episode as "unabashedly a tragedy, one that steadily accelerates through the evening as more and more power lands in the laps of people manifestly unequipped to wield it," and praised Parekh's direction for making the episode feel "chaotic but never incomprehensible, allowing the electoral maneuvering to breathe, and letting the rare moments of silence stand out." Scott Tobias of Vulture gave the episode 5 out of 5 stars, calling the episode "bone-chilling" and praising Armstrong's "diabolical" writing for capturing the "perverse, top-down, ratings-grubbing incentives of cable news". CNN's Brian Lowry called the episode "brilliant", writing that it "presciently mirrored" the internal discussions at Fox amidst the Dominion lawsuit, and applauded Armstrong for "deliver[ing] a thought-provoking observation about dysfunctional media dynasties, placing corporate interests ahead of ethics or journalism and the potential collateral damage that can inflict." Both Hughes and Tobias praised Adam Godley's guest performance.

Similar to the third season's "What It Takes", some critics took issue with the episode's handling of its parallels to real-world politics, which certain reviewers perceived as blunt and overly familiar. Spencer Kornhaber of The Atlantic wrote that the episode's political satire was "a bit overwrought", feeling that the story "[took] on the tidiness of a sermon" despite the episode's "stellar" writing and performances. He added, "The overarching narrative feels a bit cartoonish too: A Rube Goldberg machine of selfishness and unresolved daddy issues elects a new Hitler, oops!" Noel Murray of The New York Times called the episode "action packed" and "nerve-shredding", but wrote that "it does cut uncomfortably closer to real-world politics than is typical for 'Succession'", noting how closely it hewed to events surrounding the 2016 and 2020 elections compared to the series' typically broad satire of the "blinded arrogance of the powerful". Ben Travers of IndieWire gave the episode a B+, writing that the series "uses the intense 65-minute episode to double down on one of its broader (if not all-that-new) points: Corporate influence is killing this country, and watching it happen is worse than simply imagining it."

=== Accolades ===
At the 75th Primetime Emmy Awards, Nicholas Braun submitted this episode to support his nomination for Outstanding Supporting Actor in a Drama Series.
