= With Open Eyes =

- Succession episode
- Episode no.: Season 4 Episode 10
- Directed by: Mark Mylod
- Written by: Jesse Armstrong
- Cinematography by: Patrick Capone
- Original air date: May 28, 2023
- Running time: 88 minutes

Guest appearances
- Harriet Walter as Lady Caroline Collingwood; Hope Davis as Sandi Furness; Jóhannes Haukur Jóhannesson as Oskar Guðjohnsen; Eili Harboe as Ebba; James Cromwell as Ewan Roy; Zoë Winters as Kerry Castellabate; Scott Nicholson as Colin Stiles; Pip Torrens as Peter Munion; Larry Pine as Sandy Furness; Kevin Changaris as Tellis; David Patrick Kelly as Paul Chambers; Elliot Villar (photograph) as Daniel Jiménez

Episode chronology
← Previous "Church and State"	Next → —
- Succession season 4

"With Open Eyes" is the series finale of the American satirical black comedy-drama television series Succession. It is the tenth episode of the fourth season, and the 39th overall. Written by series creator Jesse Armstrong and directed by Mark Mylod, the episode originally aired on HBO on May 28, 2023.

Succession centers on the Roy family, the owners of global media and entertainment conglomerate Waystar RoyCo, and their fight for control of the company amidst uncertainty about the health of the family's patriarch Logan (Brian Cox), who has died by this point of the series. The episode follows Logan's three youngest children Kendall (Jeremy Strong), Shiv (Sarah Snook) and Roman (Kieran Culkin) as they attempt to sway Waystar board members before the vote on GoJo's acquisition of the company. A last-minute change to the firm's leadership plans post-acquisition shifts the Roy siblings' alliances.

"With Open Eyes" received critical acclaim for its performances, directing, writing, and emotional conclusion to the series' narrative. Many critics called it one of the greatest series finales of all time. It received two Primetime Emmy Award nominations, including an Outstanding Lead Actor in a Drama Series nomination for Strong, who ultimately lost to Culkin's performance in the previous episode.

== Plot ==
Kendall scrambles to vote down the GoJo acquisition before the board meeting, while Shiv and Matsson are confident their coalition will vote in favor. Kendall and Shiv fly to Caroline's residence in Barbados after learning that Roman is recovering from his wounds there. (Note: As seen in "Church and State".) En route, Shiv calls Tom to ask they give their relationship a second chance, but he is hesitant.

Tom meets with Matsson, who admits that his sexual attraction to Shiv would cause complications in the workplace and offers Tom the CEO role instead. Greg overhears Matsson talking with Oskar in Swedish and uses a translator app to learn that Shiv will not be named CEO; he informs Kendall, who convinces Shiv to turn against Matsson. As only a single CEO will satisfy the board, Shiv and Roman form a bloc and reluctantly endorse Kendall despite their doubts about his competence. The siblings share a playful moment in Caroline's kitchen, where they "anoint" Kendall with a smoothie of random unappetizing ingredients.

The three return to New York the next day, where Connor and Willa are dividing Logan's assets. (Note: Connor purchased Logan's apartment from Marcia in "Honeymoon States".) The siblings become emotional watching a home video of Logan enjoying a dinner with Kerry, Connor, and his senior cadre, where Karl sings Robert Burns' song "Green Grow the Rushes". Shiv is irate to learn from Tom that Matsson has picked him to be CEO, and declares that enough votes are secured to stop the deal. The siblings race to the Waystar headquarters to amass an opposition to the deal while Tom berates Greg for leaking the news of his appointment as CEO, leading to a brief physical fight between the two.

Before the board meeting, Roman glimpses Gerri in the office and breaks down, wondering why he could not have been CEO; Kendall hugs him so hard that Roman's stitches burst, causing some bleeding. Roman votes against the deal at the board meeting as expected, leaving Shiv to cast the deciding vote. However, Shiv becomes reluctant. After the three siblings go to a meeting room to try and find a solution, Shiv expresses her doubts that Kendall would be a good CEO, causing Kendall to panic. She cites his accidental killing of Andrew Dodds, (Note: As depicted in "Nobody Is Ever Missing".) but Kendall frantically claims that it never happened and that he made up the story to feel closer to his siblings, angering and confusing Roman and Shiv. Kendall asserts he deserves to be CEO as the eldest sibling —ignoring that Connor is actually the eldest sibling— but Roman retorts that Shiv's pregnancy actually carries on the Roy bloodline since Logan did not consider Kendall's children legitimate. An enraged Kendall attacks Roman, convincing Shiv to vote for the deal. A despondent Roman tells Kendall that he, his siblings, and the company itself are "bullshit".

As Waystar's new CEO, Tom elects to retain Gerri, Greg, and Karolina, whilst planning to fire Frank, Hugo, and Karl. On their drive home, Tom and Shiv silently touch hands. Roman has a moment to himself at a bar. A devastated Kendall walks around Battery Park, shadowed by his bodyguard Colin.

== Production ==
"With Open Eyes" was written by Succession creator and showrunner Jesse Armstrong and directed by Mark Mylod in his sixteenth episode for the series. At 88 minutes, the episode is the longest of the series. Like the other season finales, its title is derived from John Berryman's poem "Dream Song 29".

=== Writing ===
While Armstrong envisioned the series' fourth season as its conclusion, he continued to ponder ideas for future storylines throughout the season's production, and only confirmed the ending to the cast during the table read for the series finale. Armstrong elaborated that "the decision to end solidified through the writing", stating: "The [more] we discussed it in the room, the more and more clear it became to me that the sequence of Logan's death, the competition over whether to sell or not – intersecting with an election – and [Logan's] funeral ended with the show ending. And once that became clear, I didn't really have any doubts".

In crafting the ending, Armstrong stated that he had the idea of Tom as the company's successor for "quite a while", feeling it reflected real-life figures who "drift upwards and make themselves amenable to powerful people." Regarding the fate of the siblings, Mylod felt it "inevitable" given his interpretation of the series as a "tragedy" at heart, characterizing the siblings' ending as "a consequence of their nature and their upbringing." Armstrong stated that while each of the siblings "will carry on", the finale is "where the show loses interest in them, because they've lost what they wanted, which was to succeed." William Hughes of The A.V. Club opined that the ending was true to the essence of the series, which he argued was less a "prestige drama about the terrible things people do for power" and more "a show about idiots, fucking up."

=== Filming ===
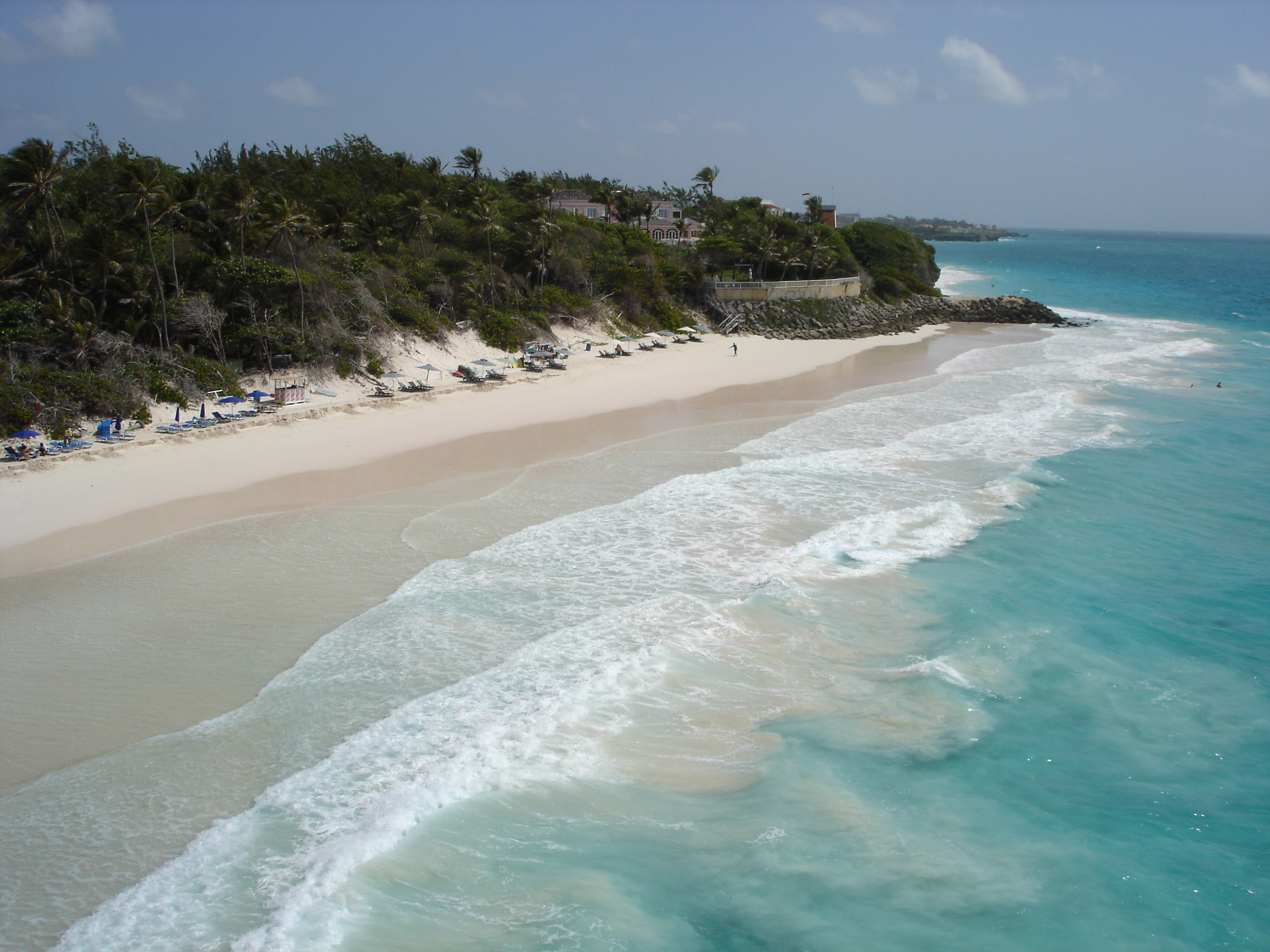
A significant portion of the finale was filmed on location in Barbados.

Brian Cox makes a final reappearance as Logan in a recorded video of him, Connor, and his senior executives enjoying dinner together. To consolidate time spent on the set of Logan's apartment—which was built on a soundstage—the video was filmed one hour before the subsequent scene of the four siblings watching it together, with none of the actors being shown the video beforehand in order to capture their true emotional reactions. Armstrong scripted the "basic layout" of the scene taking place in the video, while Cox and his scene partners were given "a lot of latitude" to improvise by Mylod.

The episode's portions taking place in Barbados were filmed on location, and were the last material to be shot for the series. Mylod, who characterized the scene between Kendall, Roman and Shiv in the kitchen as "the happiest and the closest we’ve ever seen the Roy siblings," strove to bring an improvisational, unscripted tone to the scene to convey what he described as "the tragedy of hope". Actor Jeremy Strong insisted on actually drinking the smoothie of inedible ingredients that Kendall's siblings prepare for him; according to Mylod, Strong would "lean over and retch into the kitchen sink" between takes, continuing to drink the mixture until the scene was complete.

==== Closing Battery Park scene ====
While filming the episode's final scene depicting Kendall sitting in Battery Park, Strong spontaneously climbed over the guardrails towards the water without warning the crew, which "terrified" Armstrong due to the lack of requisite safety measures typically involved in such scenes. Strong inferred that the character of Kendall would have had a suicidal urge in the moment, finding parallels to the real-life suicide by drowning of poet John Berryman (whose "Dream Song 29" provides the namesake of every Succession season finale). Strong stated, "I don't know whether in that moment I felt that Kendall just wanted to die—I think he did—or if he wanted to be saved by essentially a proxy of his father. (...) I also don't know if [Kendall] would've had the courage to actually go in that water, because my God, it would've been hard to do. But I think you even feel on a cellular level the intention or the longing to cross that threshold." Mylod admitted that Strong's interpretation of the character's mental state was "probably entirely accurate", but stated that he and Armstrong opted to leave the moment ambiguous, in order to "keep open another (...) equally tragic future for the character... that he would just have to live out his life in that purposeful emptiness of unfulfilled destiny."

== Reception ==
=== Critical reception ===
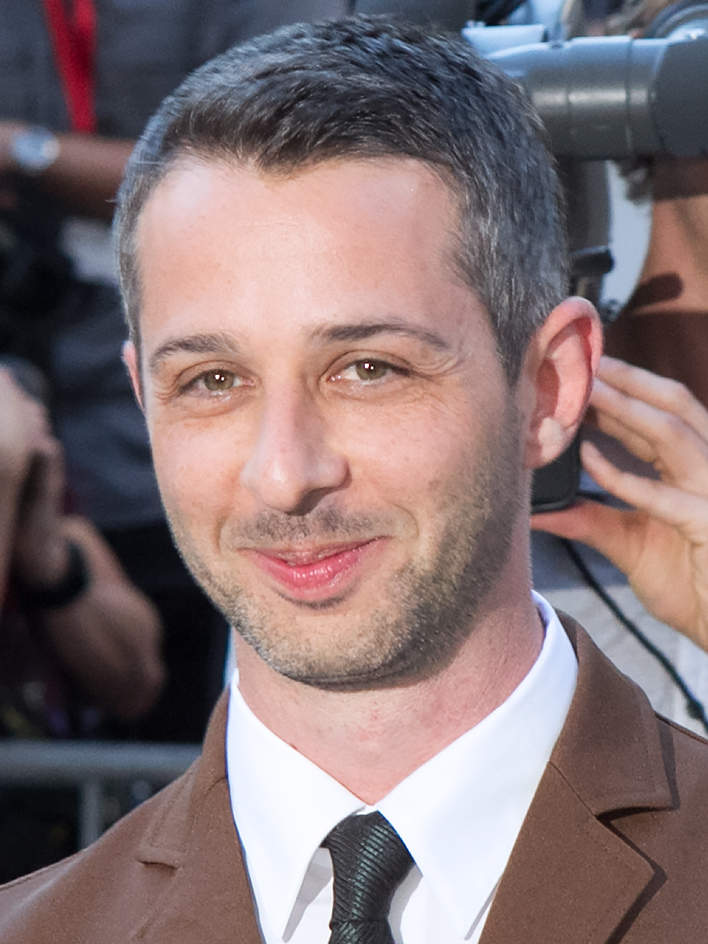
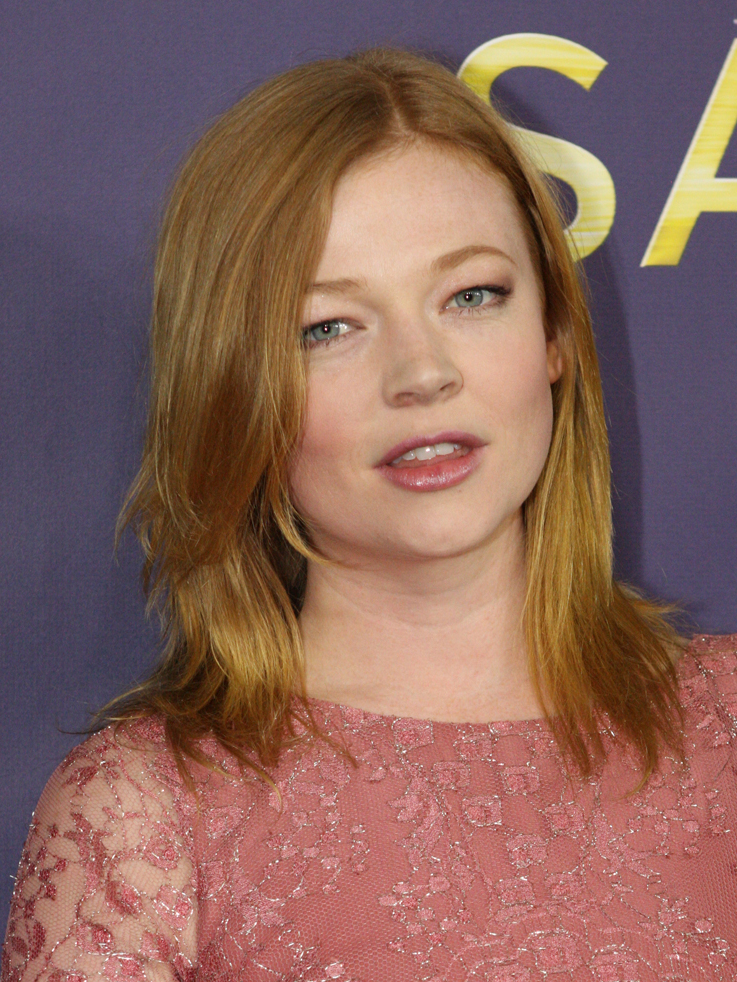
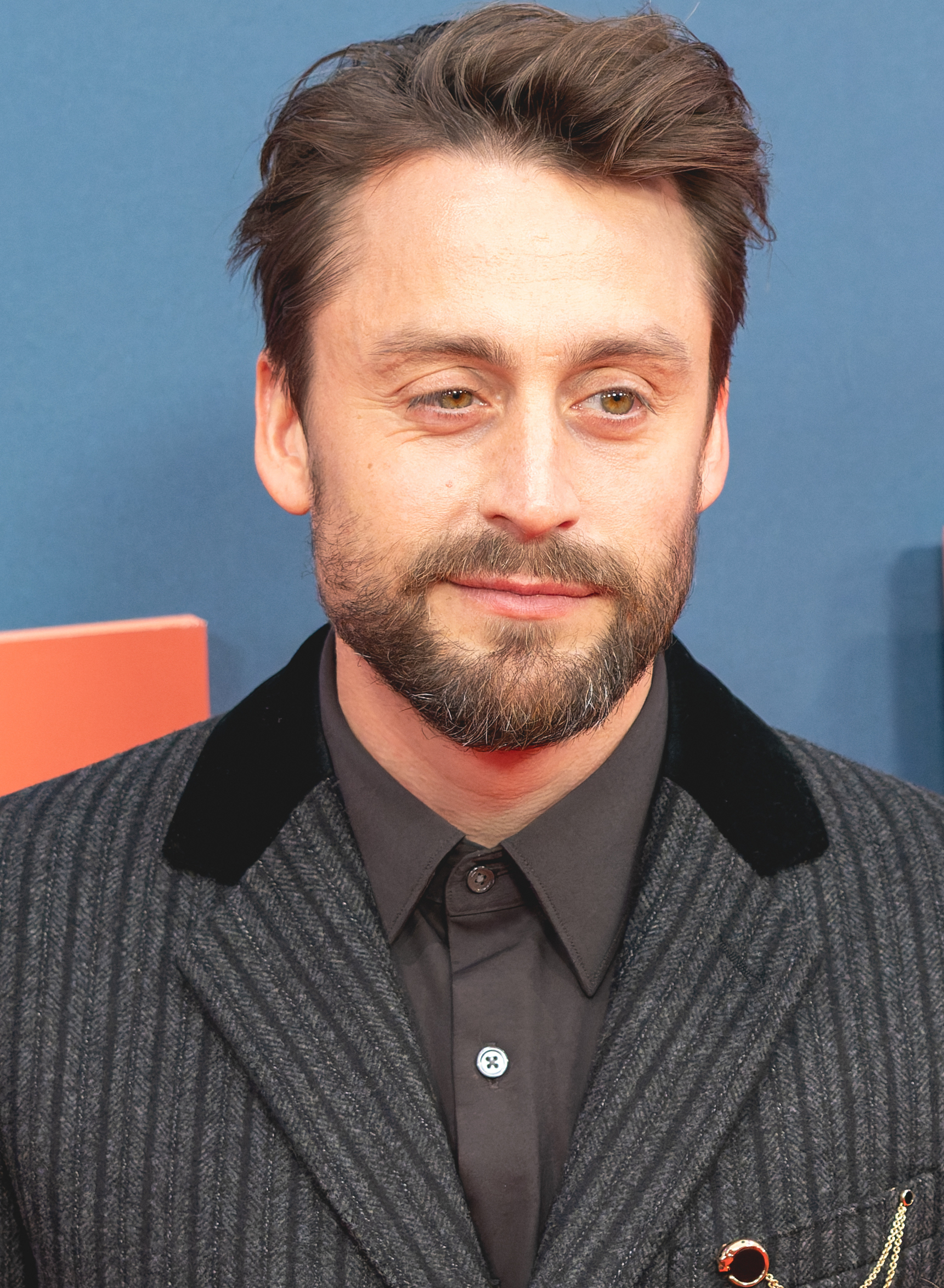
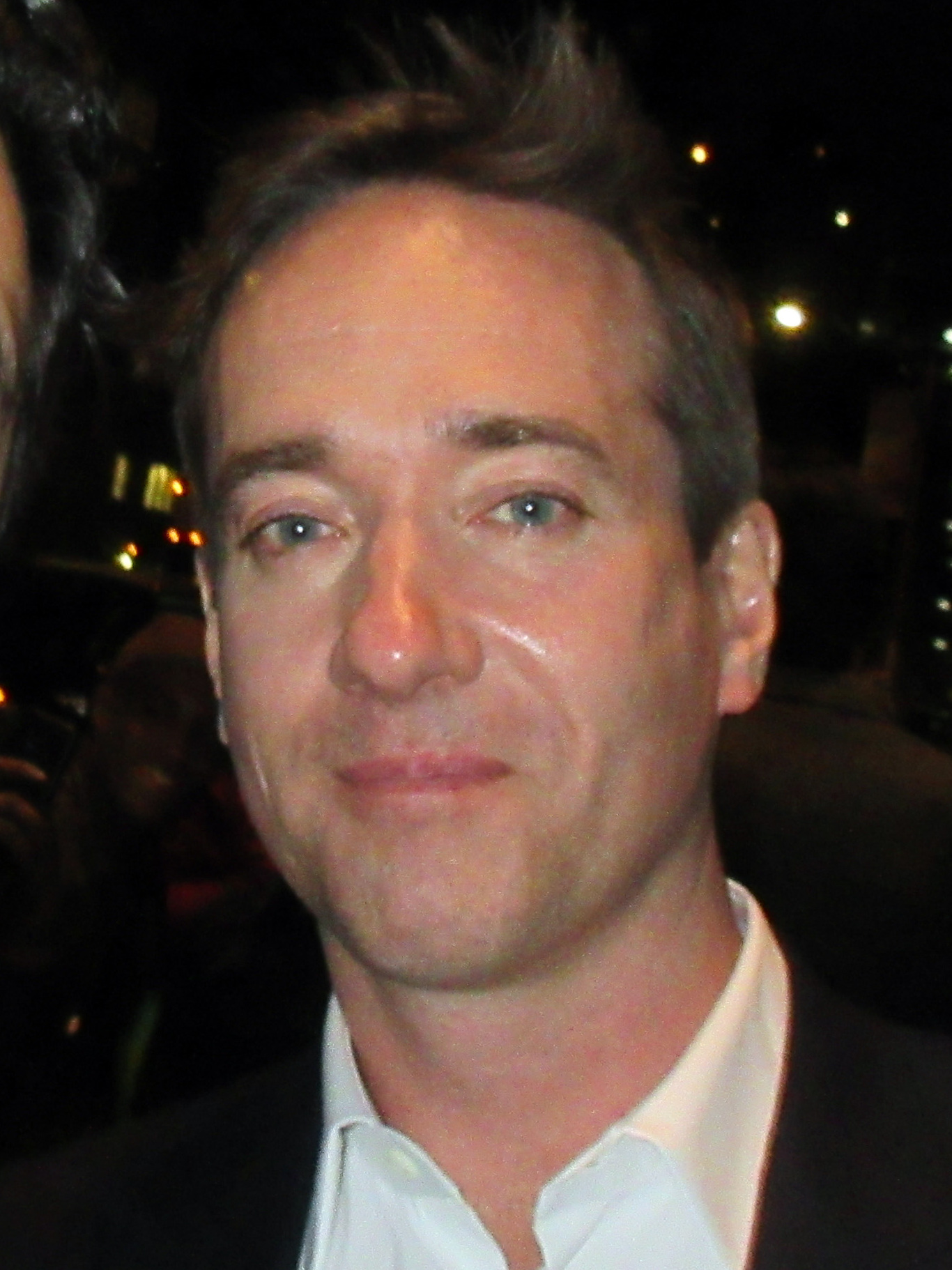
The performances of Jeremy Strong, Sarah Snook, Kieran Culkin, and Matthew Macfadyen were highly praised by critics.

"With Open Eyes" received widespread critical acclaim, with reviewers praising the cast's performances, Armstrong's script, Mylod's direction, and the emotionally and thematically resonant conclusion to the series. On the review aggregator Rotten Tomatoes, the episode holds an approval rating of 100% based on 41 reviews, with an average rating of 9.1/10. The website's critical consensus states, "Delivering maximum devastation while feeling preordained from the very start, "With Open Eyes" closes out Succession on a note that rings bitter and true."

William Hughes of The A.V. Club gave the episode an A, feeling the episode made effective use of its extended runtime to showcase the "little human moments" between the characters, which he described as "more precious because they managed to bubble up through the sea of awfulness." Scott Tobias of Vulture gave the episode 5 out of 5 stars, praising the "wonderful" scenes between the siblings in Barbados, as well as Armstrong's script. He wrote: "With his engineering of this ending, creator Jesse Armstrong has done what great writers often do: Make us guess wildly (and ridiculously) over a conclusion that was right in front of us all along." Brian Lowry of CNN called the finale "riveting", writing, "All the key relationships played out in ways that felt perfectly attuned to where the show had been building over the course of this extraordinary season."

The cast's performances were highly praised. Dominic Patten of Deadline called the finale "pure palace intrigue in sight and sound", praising the "marvelous" performances of Jeremy Strong, Sarah Snook, Kieran Culkin and Matthew Macfadyen. Erik Kain of Forbes called the finale "a really powerful, overwhelming episode of TV, wrapping up one of the best episodes of any show I've ever seen in a profoundly satisfying way". He praised the "sincere and moving" scenes of the siblings bonding, as well as the acting, singling out Alexander Skarsgård's "terrific" performance as Matsson. Carol Midgley of The Times called the series' conclusion "inspired and superbly executed", singling out the "magnificent nuance" of Macfadyen's performance. Alan Sepinwall of Rolling Stone applauded Strong, Culkin and Snook for bringing "nuance, power and comedy" to "characters who could have been caricatures in even slightly lesser hands."

Certain reviewers were more impressed with the finale as a conclusion of the series overall than as an individual episode. Sepinwall felt the finale to be "the feel-bad ending the show has always been building toward", citing the "incredible" concluding scenes as the episode's strongest, while calling the rest "entertaining, albeit perhaps not as memorable as several of this season's other installments." Alison Herman of Variety characterized the finale as "the distilled, concentrated essence" of the series: similar to Sepinwall, she found the episode less remarkable than others in the series, but felt it excelled at "stat[ing] a few fundamental truths with startling candor, as if the characters have been ground down to the most unvarnished version of themselves." Hughes wrote, "Is 'With Open Eyes' a good series finale? I suspect that it might not be, in practical plotting terms; (...) there's no ending Armstrong could craft that could satisfy both the desire we all have for a dramatic conclusion to this story, and the show's inherent satirical nature. (...) But as a showcase for character, the place where this show has always excelled, it serves as an exceptional farewell."

=== Accolades ===
TVLine named Jeremy Strong "Performer of the Week" for the week of June 3, 2023, for his performance in the episode. The site wrote, "This week’s series finale was supposed to be a coronation for Kendall Roy. Instead, it was the latest in a string of humiliating defeats, and the ultimate one, with Kendall failing in his quest to take over for his late father Logan as CEO of Waystar Royco. But at the same time, it was a fittingly grand final act for Strong, as he found an exquisite pathos in Kendall’s downfall and put the finishing touches on one of the best TV performances of the past decade," adding that "it was a tragic ending for a tragic character, and though Kendall was far from perfect, Strong’s unforgettable performance made his flaws fascinating, right down to the final shot."

At the 75th Primetime Emmy Awards, Jeremy Strong submitted this episode to support his nomination for Outstanding Lead Actor in a Drama Series.
