= Rehearsal (Succession) =

- Succession episode
- Episode no.: Season 4 Episode 2
- Directed by: Becky Martin
- Written by: Tony Roche; Susan Soon He Stanton
- Cinematography by: Katelin Arizmendi
- Original air date: April 2, 2023
- Running time: 58 minutes

Guest appearances
- Hope Davis as Sandi Furness; Jeannie Berlin as Cyd Peach; Justin Kirk (photograph) as Jeryd Mencken; Zoë Winters as Kerry Castellabate; Scott Nicholson as Colin Stiles; Juliana Canfield as Jess Jordan; Kevin Changaris as Tellis; Cynthia Mace as Sylvia; Sydney Lemmon as Jennifer; Elliot Villar (photograph) as Daniel Jiménez

Episode chronology
← Previous "The Munsters"	Next → "Connor's Wedding"
- Succession season 4

"Rehearsal" is the second episode of the fourth season of the American satirical comedy-drama television series Succession, and the 31st episode overall. It was written by Tony Roche and Susan Soon He Stanton and directed by Becky Martin, and originally aired on HBO on April 2, 2023.

Succession centers on the Roy family, the owners of global media and entertainment conglomerate Waystar RoyCo, and their fight for control of the company amidst uncertainty about the health of the family's patriarch Logan (Brian Cox). The episode primarily follows the efforts of Logan's three youngest children Kendall (Jeremy Strong), Shiv (Sarah Snook) and Roman (Kieran Culkin) to stall GoJo's acquisition of Waystar to negotiate a price increase, while reuniting with their older half-brother Connor (Alan Ruck) at the rehearsal dinner for his wedding. The episode is the first to feature Alexander Skarsgård, who plays media mogul Lukas Matsson, as main cast member, after appearing as a guest in the last three episodes of season three.

“Rehearsal" received critical acclaim, with reviewers praising its emotional weight, performances (particularly Ruck's), and tonal balance. For their performances in this episode, Cox was nominated for the Primetime Emmy Award for Outstanding Lead Actor in a Drama Series, and Ruck was nominated for Outstanding Supporting Actor in a Drama Series.

== Plot ==
Logan, who gets to keep ATN per the terms of GoJo's acquisition of Waystar, visits the newsroom, where he delivers a bombastic speech about his plans to reinvent the network's brand and messaging. Kerry, meanwhile, wants to become an ATN anchor, but her audition tape is mocked across the company - as well as by the siblings, who are in Albany to strategize following their acquisition of PGM. (Note: As depicted in "The Munsters.") Shiv is angered to learn that Tom—per Logan's advice—has met with most of New York's prominent divorce attorneys, thus disqualifying them from representing her.

The siblings return to the city to attend Connor and Willa's rehearsal dinner for their wedding, though they arrive late after Logan rescinds their access to the helicopter that was supposed to take them there. Stewy and Sandi meet them to propose vetoing the GoJo acquisition at Waystar's board meeting the next day to negotiate a price increase; Shiv is the only one who supports the idea. The siblings spot Willa and her friends leaving the rehearsal dinner on their way in; a dejected Connor tells them Willa is having doubts about marrying him.

The four siblings go out for drinks. Kendall privately takes a call from Matsson, who threatens to call off the Waystar acquisition if pressured by the board on price. Kendall suddenly becomes interested in Stewy and Sandi's offer, but does not tell the siblings about his call with Matsson. Roman nonetheless surmises that Matsson will not renegotiate the price; both he and Connor chastise Kendall and Shiv for jeopardizing the children's payout in favor of spiting Logan. Kendall and Shiv are concerned to learn Roman is still in correspondence with Logan over text, but Roman dismisses their concerns and agrees to back Sandi and Stewy.

Tom, meanwhile, admits to Logan that Kerry is not fit to be a news anchor; Logan has Tom discreetly reject her audition, while Tom passes the task onto Greg. Logan learns of the siblings' partnership with Sandi and Stewy and decides to meet his children - who are at a karaoke bar - to convince them to allow the GoJo sale to go through. Kendall and Shiv refuse to make peace with their father, and unsuccessfully demand an apology from him for his abusive parenting. Shiv furthermore refuses to believe Logan's claim that Matsson will call off the deal if pushed for more money, while Kendall still does not disclose having heard the same from Matsson himself. An exasperated Logan tells his children that they are "not serious people", and leaves. Outside, he asks Kerry to arrange a meeting between himself, Matsson, and the rest of Waystar's executives except for Gerri.

Connor returns home and is relieved to find that Willa has chosen to stay with him. Roman visits Logan at his home, where Logan asks his help in negotiating with Matsson. Logan also offers Roman Cyd's place as head of ATN under his new vision for the network.

== Production ==
=== Writing ===
"Rehearsal" was written by Tony Roche and Susan Soon He Stanton — the second episode the pair have written together after the third season's "Retired Janitors of Idaho" — and directed by Becky Martin, who directed the majority of episodes for Succession creator Jesse Armstrong's prior series, Peep Show. Arian Moayed (Stewy) and Alexander Skarsgård (Lukas Matsson) were credited in the opening titles for the episode, the latter having been promoted to series regular in the fourth season.

Christopher Bonanos of Vulture interpreted the scene of Logan giving a speech to ATN on a podium made of copy paper boxes as a parody of a speech Rupert Murdoch gave to the staff of The Wall Street Journal in December 2007 after acquiring the paper, where Murdoch similarly stood on an improvised podium made of office boxes. As for the subplot involving Kerry's failed attempt to become an ATN anchor, Vulture's Scott Tobias drew similarities to Citizen Kane, where Charles Foster Kane encourages his mistress Susan to become an opera singer, only for her to give a disastrous performance. Actress Zoë Winters, who plays Kerry, stated in an interview with The Hollywood Reporter that she took inspiration from conservative news commentators, such as Laura Ingraham and Tomi Lahren, in crafting Kerry's audition tape. Winters also recalled discussions with director and executive producer Mark Mylod regarding Kerry's backstory, which included her education in political science and journalism, and a longstanding ambition to work in politics.

=== Filming ===
The siblings' reunion with Connor at his rehearsal dinner was filmed at The Grill, a steakhouse formerly belonging to the Four Seasons Restaurant in New York's Seagram Building. The remainder of the scenes involving the siblings were filmed at the Peter McManus Cafe in Chelsea, as well as the Maru Karaoke Lounge in Koreatown. CNBC's corporate headquarters in New Jersey stood in for the ATN newsroom.

== Reception ==
=== Ratings ===
Upon airing, the episode was watched by 0.481 million viewers, with an 18-49 rating of 0.10.

=== Critical reception ===
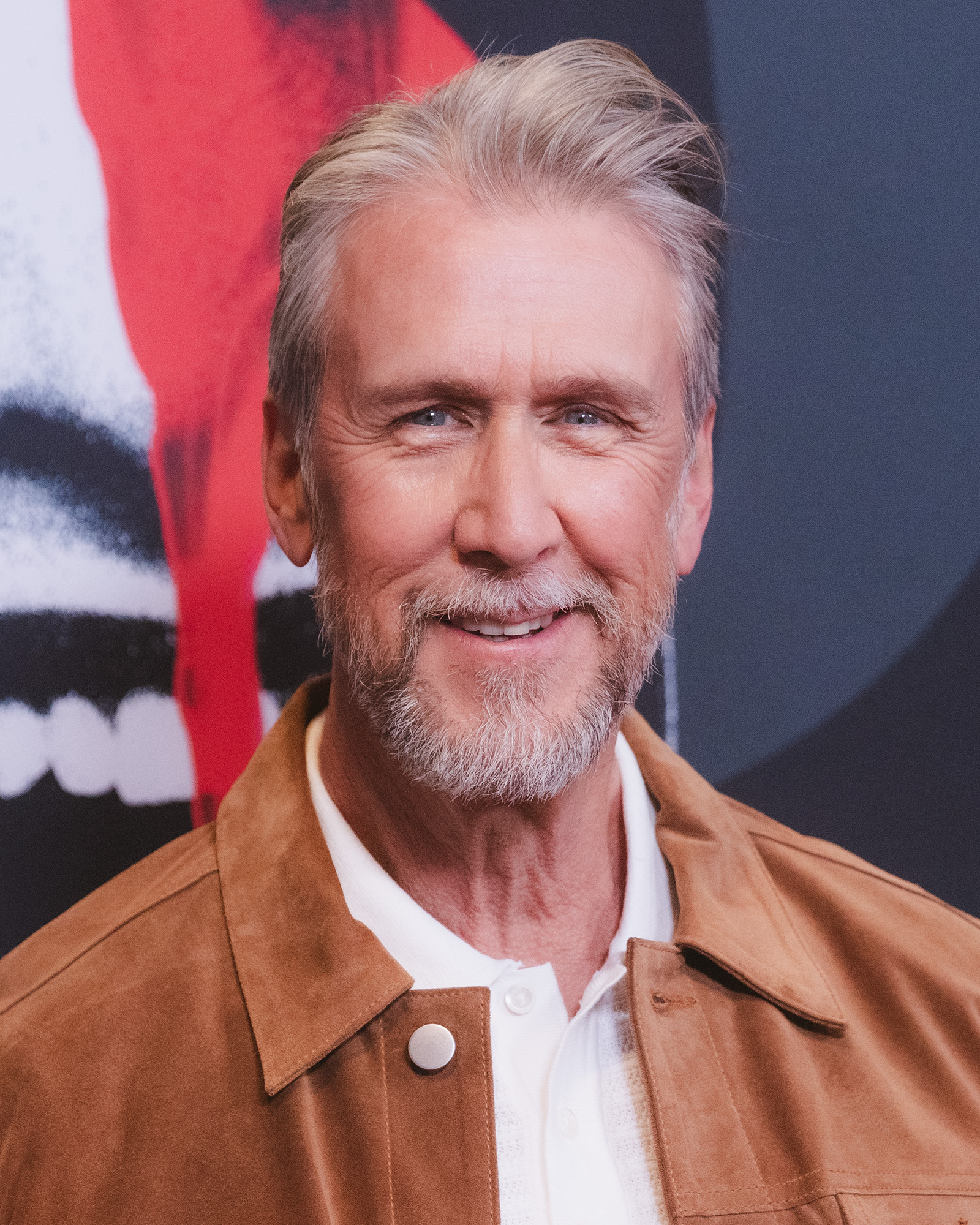
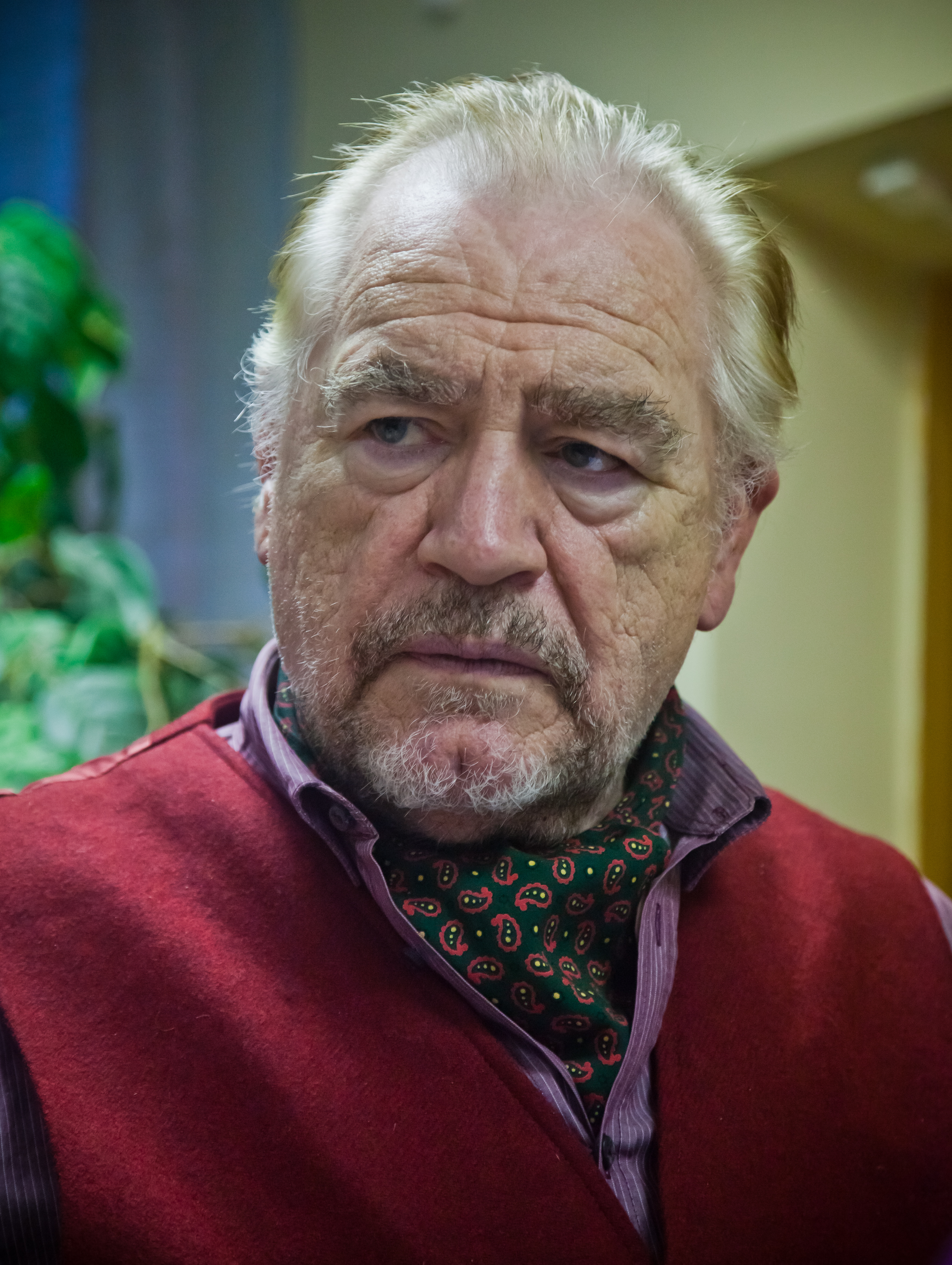
Alan Ruck and Brian Cox received critical acclaim for their performances in the episode.

"Rehearsal" received critical acclaim, with reviewers praising its emotional weight, performances (particularly that of Alan Ruck), and tonal balance. On the review aggregator Rotten Tomatoes, it holds an approval rating of 95% based on 19 reviews. The website's critical consensus states, "Showing the softer underbelly of the prickly Roys, "Rehearsal" revisits Succession's miraculous knack for bringing genuine heart to monsters of privilege."

William Hughes of The A.V. Club gave the episode an A, writing about the ensemble scene at the end of the episode: "Succession plays very sparingly with getting as much of its cast in the room together as it does here, and the result is typically impressive." He noted the episode's increased focus on Connor, writing that Ruck "gives one of his best performances of his entire lovely, ever out-of-focus tenure on this show," and praised the episode's balance of drama and humor, writing that Winters "makes a strong case for herself as an early frontrunner for the season's comedy MVP" and similarly singling out the scenes involving Greg. Scott Tobias of Vulture gave the episode 5 stars out 5, calling Ruck "devastatingly good" and praising Connor's characterization in the episode for "reveal[ing] an acute, heartbreaking awareness of his marginal status." He reserved similar praise for the scene between Logan and his children, feeling it displayed the writers' "strong feeling for the agonies that eat away at all these characters."

Ben Travers of IndieWire gave the episode a B+, commending the episode's characterization of Logan as "a wayward, unloved retiree — worrying about what's next while manipulating the only people he still has any power over: his family." Mary Siroky of Consequence called the episode "devastating", praising the scene between Logan and the siblings for "revisit[ing] some past traumas that have only been alluded to in previous seasons — physical abuse of Roman as a child, Logan locking up Connor's mother, and, of course, the explosive betrayal that took place at the end of Season 3." She wrote: "One of the most impressive things about the writing in this show about generally awful people is the way it manages to imbue sympathy and nuance into just about everyone onscreen."

=== Accolades ===
TVLine named Brian Cox "Performer of the Week" for the week of April 8, 2023, for his work in the episode. The site wrote, "Succession is a grandly constructed Shakespearean drama, and it works because Cox gives it the domineering, fascinating father figure it needs at its center". The authors praised Cox for "summon[ing] a formidable energy as Logan let his family and employees know that this aging lion can still roar, while also revealing just the slightest hint of vulnerability."

At the 75th Primetime Emmy Awards, Brian Cox and Alan Ruck submitted this episode to support their nominations for Outstanding Lead Actor in a Drama Series and Outstanding Supporting Actor in a Drama Series, respectively.
