= The Munsters (Succession) =

- Succession episode
- Episode no.: Season 4 Episode 1
- Directed by: Mark Mylod
- Written by: Jesse Armstrong
- Cinematography by: Patrick Capone
- Original air date: March 26, 2023
- Running time: 65 minutes

Guest appearances
- Cherry Jones as Nan Pierce; Jeannie Berlin as Cyd Peach; Zoë Winters as Kerry Castellabate; Scott Nicholson as Colin Stiles; Annabelle Dexter-Jones as Naomi Pierce; Jeremy Shamos as Mark Pierce; Juliana Canfield as Jess Jordan; Patch Darragh as Ray Kennedy; Kevin Changaris as Tellis; Francesca Root-Dodson as Bridget

Episode chronology
← Previous "All the Bells Say"	Next → "Rehearsal"
- Succession season 4

"The Munsters" is the fourth-season premiere of the American satirical comedy-drama television series Succession, and the 30th episode overall. It was written by series creator Jesse Armstrong and directed by Mark Mylod, and originally aired on HBO on March 26, 2023.

Succession centers on the Roy family, the owners of global media and entertainment conglomerate Waystar RoyCo, and their fight for control of the company amidst uncertainty about the health of the family's patriarch Logan (Brian Cox). The episode takes place months after the season three finale "All the Bells Say", during which alignments within the family shifted heavily; Logan's three youngest children Kendall (Jeremy Strong), Shiv (Sarah Snook) and Roman (Kieran Culkin) are now teamed up against their father, against whom they race to land a bid for Pierce Global Media, days before Logan's planned sale of Waystar to GoJo.

"The Munsters" received critical acclaim, with praise for the episode's performances, script, and emotional resonance, particularly during the final scene. For her performance as Pierce matriarch Nan, Cherry Jones was nominated for the Primetime Emmy Award for Outstanding Guest Actress in a Drama Series, having previously won the award for her performance in the season two episode "Tern Haven".

== Plot ==
Six months after being cut out of GoJo's acquisition of Waystar RoyCo by Logan, (Note: As depicted in "All the Bells Say".) Kendall, Shiv and Roman are prepared to resign from the company and are in Los Angeles to meet investors for their proposed new media brand, "The Hundred". Shiv gets a call from Tom—from whom she is now on trial separation—saying he just met with Naomi Pierce. The siblings realize that Logan is again attempting to buy Pierce Global Media (PGM); both Kendall and Shiv are immediately in favor of abandoning The Hundred to launch a rival bid, while Roman is initially apprehensive, suggesting the two are driven by their vendettas against Logan and Tom respectively. The three eventually resolve to make an offer to the Pierces.

Logan, meanwhile, is in New York celebrating his birthday at his home, 48 hours away from completing the GoJo acquisition. Connor is the only one of his children present, his presidential campaign polling at 1 percent. Tom informs Logan that the Pierces are interested in a deal, and unsuccessfully asks Logan for assurances about his position at Waystar should he and Shiv divorce. Logan, fed up with the party, leaves to get dinner with his bodyguard Colin, where he ruminates on the economic value of people, mortality, and the possibility of an afterlife. He later returns to his apartment and summons Tom and the rest of his senior cadre to his study to finalize the deal with the Pierces; Karl informs him that his children have launched a competing bid.

The siblings travel to Nan Pierce's California estate and are greeted by Naomi, whose relationship with Kendall has ended. Nan claims to be indecisive about whose offer to take, torn between her distaste for Logan and PGM's urgency for stable financing amidst its waning public support. Roman realizes she is angling for them to make a higher bid than Logan. The siblings go outside to deliberate, while Logan lowballs the Pierces with a $6 billion offer. The siblings, meanwhile, offer $8 billion, but are told by Naomi that Nan still wants more "upside". Unable to reach Logan directly, Shiv calls Tom and goads him into admitting that Logan's price ceiling is $12 billion, the same as theirs. The siblings decide on $10 billion, knowing Nan cannot refuse the offer. Nan ultimately accepts, forcing Logan to concede.

Shiv returns to her New York apartment to retrieve her clothes and is surprised to see Tom there. Though the two remain emotionally distant, Tom expresses his desire to have a conversation about what went wrong in their marriage before they separate. Shiv, however, insists on going through with a divorce as painlessly as possible. Meanwhile, a dejected Logan watches ATN's nightly news broadcast alone, and calls network head Cyd Peach to lambaste her over the quality of its content.

== Production ==
"The Munsters" was written by Succession creator Jesse Armstrong and directed by Mark Mylod in his thirteenth episode for the series. The episode derives its title from the 1960s sitcom of the same name. Cherry Jones returns as Nan Pierce from the second season after being absent from the third.

The series filmed in and around Los Angeles for the fourth season, with a property in the Pacific Palisades in Santa Monica, known as the "San Onofre Estate", being used as Kendall, Shiv and Roman's base of operations. Meanwhile, the Peabody Estate in Montecito, which was bought by former Google CEO Eric Schmidt in 2020, was used as the Pierces' California home. Filming in New York for the premiere included The Mark Hotel, where Tom dines while calling Shiv, as well as the restaurant Nectar on the Upper East Side, where Logan and Colin's dinner takes place.

Actor Brian Cox stated in an interview that the characterization of Logan in the premiere set up an overarching narrative for the fourth season of "struggling to see how the children come back into the fold — or do they come back into the fold?" He elaborated, "that’s really what is key for Logan, that he needs his kids because they are his kids and he loves them. If he didn’t love his children, it would be so much easier. But the fact that he loves his children is his Achilles' heel."

== Reception ==
=== Ratings ===
Upon airing, the episode was watched by 0.598 million viewers, with an 18-49 rating of 0.14. Across all platforms, however, the episode amassed 2.3 million viewers, making it the most-watched episode of the series at the time.

=== Critical reception ===
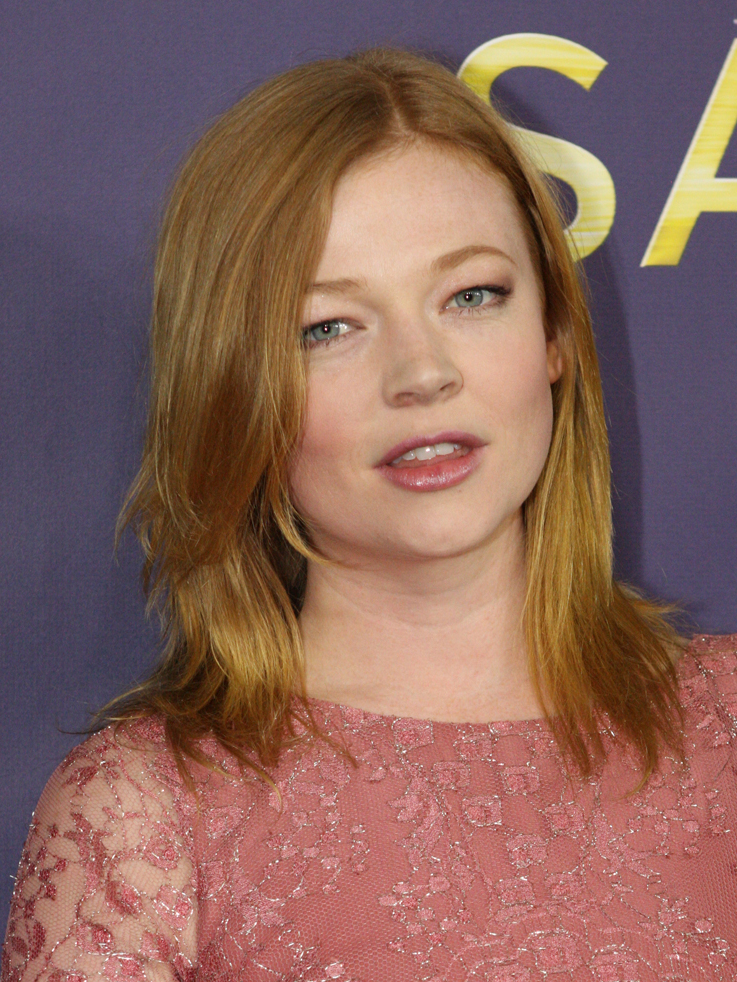
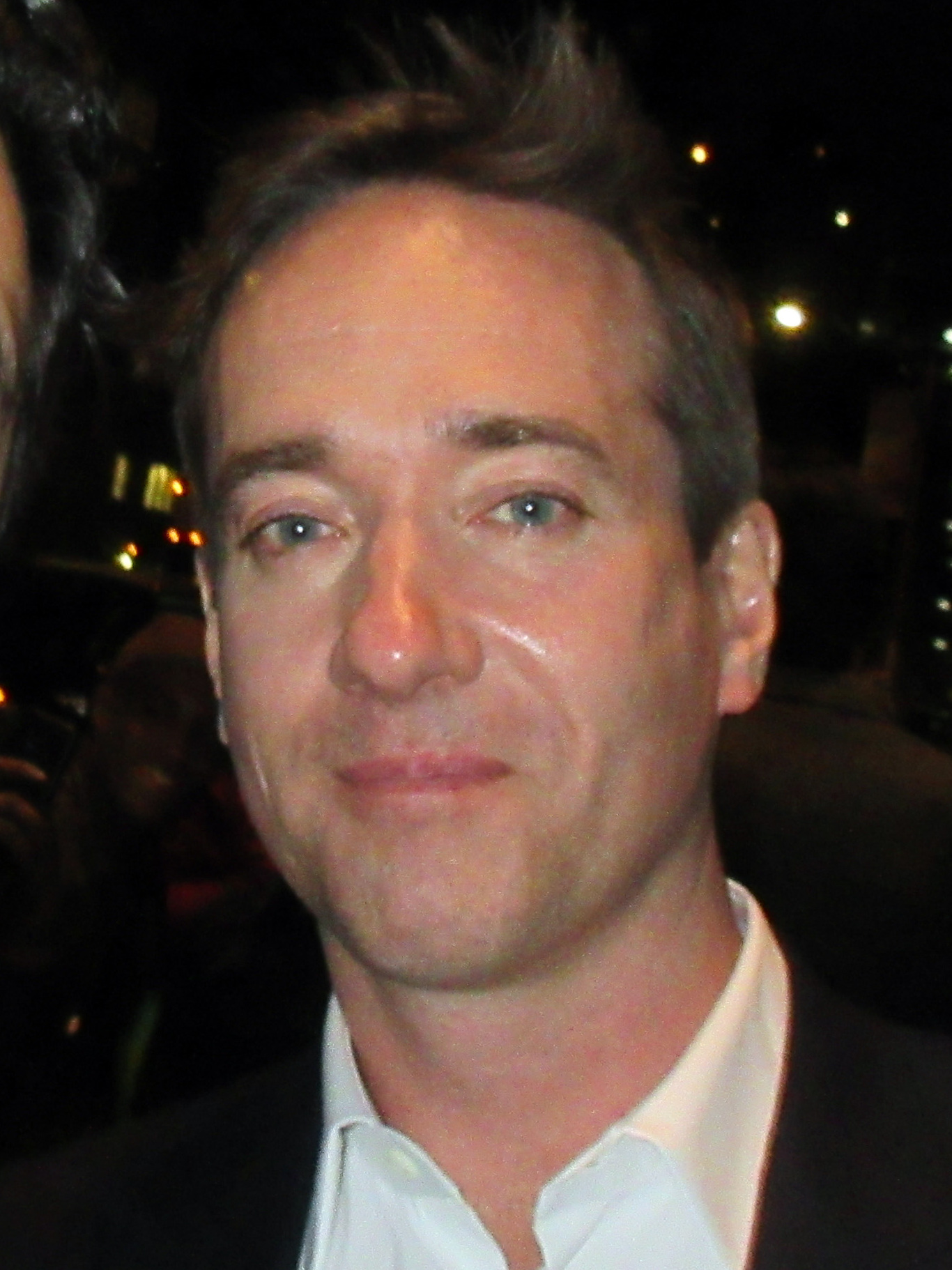
Critics praised Sarah Snook and Matthew Macfadyen's performances in the episode.

"The Munsters" received critical acclaim, with critics praising the episode's performances, script, and emotional resonance, particularly during the final scene between Tom and Shiv. On the review aggregator Rotten Tomatoes, it holds an approval rating of 100% based on sixteen reviews. The website's critical consensus states, "Logan is on top of the world and hating every minute of it in "The Munsters", a tonally refreshing reset on the Succession war that sees the Roy children try a united front for a change."

William Hughes of The A.V. Club gave the episode an A−, writing, "'The Munsters' isn't one of those big, seismic episodes of Succession that come along every once in a while; we’re setting tables here, not smashing them to pieces." Hughes praised Sarah Snook and Matthew Macfadyen's performances during the "fantastic" scene between Shiv and Tom at the end of the episode, calling it "as raw as we've ever seen these two get." He described the episode overall as "a character study into what kind of awful people our awful people are at present". Scott Tobias of Vulture gave the episode 5 out of 5 stars, observing that one of the episode's major themes was "how little money matters to people with endless amounts of it. The greatest indulgence money buys them is the freedom to turn their lives into a thrilling psychodrama, to make themselves part of 'the conversation'." Tobias praised the scenes involving Nan Pierce for "exposing the high-toned hypocrisies of a 'liberal' billionaire living high on the hog", and also called attention to the "devastating" Tom-Shiv scene.

Brandon Taylor of The New Yorker praised the episode (and the season overall) for bringing a propulsive quality to the series' storytelling he felt was absent in earlier seasons. He called the siblings' interactions "delightfully barbed and a bit puerile", and singled out the scene in the premiere between Logan and Colin, writing, "Brian Cox delivers one of the finest bits of television acting I’ve seen in a while." Bob Strauss of TheWrap wrote that "The Munsters" set up the rest of the season's storyline in "a smart, wickedly written and entertaining way", and called its penultimate scene between Shiv and Tom "one of the most emotionally devastating in the show’s history." Conversely, in a review of the overall season, Daniel Fienberg of The Hollywood Reporter felt the season's first two episodes were "among the show’s weakest ever, which is to say, 'Merely very good episodes of TV,'", and co-author Angie Han, like Hughes, characterized the premiere as a "table-setting" episode. Henry Wong of Esquire similarly described the premiere as a "tepid, occasionally great hour", calling its final two scenes its best.

Several critics noted how "The Munsters" echoed the series premiere by once again covering Logan's birthday party.
