= Succession season 4 =

Season of television series

Succession
- Season 4
- Promotional poster
- Showrunner: Jesse Armstrong
- Starring: Nicholas Braun; Brian Cox; Kieran Culkin; Dagmara Domińczyk; Peter Friedman; Justine Lupe; Matthew Macfadyen; David Rasche; Alan Ruck; J. Smith-Cameron; Sarah Snook; Fisher Stevens; Jeremy Strong; Arian Moayed; Alexander Skarsgård; Hiam Abbass
- No. of episodes: 10

Release
- Original network: HBO
- Original release: March 26 – May 28, 2023

Season chronology
- ← Previous; Season 3

The fourth and final season of the American satirical comedy-drama television series Succession premiered on HBO on March 26, 2023. Series creator Jesse Armstrong serves as the showrunner for the season. The series centers on the Roy family, the owners of global media and entertainment conglomerate Waystar RoyCo, and their fight for control of the company amidst uncertainty about the health of the family's patriarch.

The season features an ensemble cast of Nicholas Braun, Brian Cox, Kieran Culkin, Dagmara Domińczyk, Peter Friedman, Justine Lupe, Matthew Macfadyen, David Rasche, Alan Ruck, J. Smith-Cameron, Sarah Snook, Fisher Stevens and Jeremy Strong, who all return from the previous season. Hiam Abbass and Arian Moayed, who appeared in a recurring capacity in the third season, are restored to the main cast, with Alexander Skarsgård also promoted to a main role; all three are credited in episodes where they appear only.

In October 2021, HBO renewed Succession for a fourth season, which was confirmed by Armstrong to be the final season in February 2023. Filming for the season began in June 2022, in New York City. Production later moved to Norway, Los Angeles and Barbados, and ended in early 2023. The season consists of ten episodes, an increase from the previous season, which had nine.

The season received critical acclaim, and was nominated for 27 Primetime Emmy Awards, the highest amount of the series. The season received six wins, including Outstanding Drama Series, Outstanding Lead Actor in a Drama Series for Culkin, Outstanding Lead Actress in a Drama Series for Snook, Outstanding Supporting Actor in a Drama Series for Macfadyen, Outstanding Writing for a Drama Series for Armstrong, and Outstanding Directing for a Drama Series for Mark Mylod. The series finale was the most-watched episode of Succession.

== Cast and characters ==
=== Main ===
- Nicholas Braun as Greg Hirsch
- Brian Cox as Logan Roy
- Kieran Culkin as Roman Roy
- Dagmara Domińczyk as Karolina Novotney
- Peter Friedman as Frank Vernon
- Justine Lupe as Willa Ferreyra
- Matthew Macfadyen as Tom Wambsgans
- David Rasche as Karl Muller
- Alan Ruck as Connor Roy
- J. Smith-Cameron as Gerri Kellman
- Sarah Snook as Siobhan "Shiv" Roy
- Fisher Stevens as Hugo Baker
- Jeremy Strong as Kendall Roy
- Arian Moayed as Stewy Hosseini (Note: Credited when appearing.)
- Alexander Skarsgård as Lukas Matsson
- Hiam Abbass as Marcia Roy

=== Recurring ===
- Natalie Gold as Rava Roy
- Swayam Bhatia as Sophie Roy
- Larry Pine as Sandy Furness
- Zack Robidas as Mark Ravenhead
- James Cromwell as Ewan Roy
- Harriet Walter as Lady Caroline Collingwood
- Jeannie Berlin as Cyd Peach
- Patch Darragh as Ray
- Mark Linn-Baker as Maxim Pierce
- Zoë Winters as Kerry Castellabate
- Juliana Canfield as Jess Jordan
- Hope Davis as Sandi Furness
- Justin Kirk as Jeryd Mencken
- Pip Torrens as Peter Munion
- Kevin Changaris as Tellis
- Cynthia Mace as Sylvia Ferreyra
- Elliot Villar as Daniel Jiménez
- Jóhannes Haukur Jóhannesson as Oskar Guðjohnsen
- Eili Harboe as Ebba
- Brian Hotaling as Mark Rosenstock

=== Guest ===
- Quentin Morales as Iverson Roy
- Cherry Jones as Nan Pierce
- Annabelle Dexter-Jones as Naomi Pierce
- KeiLyn Durrel Jones as Remi
- Ryan Spahn as Coop
- Mary Birdsong as Marianne Hirsch

Caitlin FitzGerald, who portrays Tabitha Hayes, was announced to appear in the season, however ultimately made no appearance.

== Episodes ==
No. overall	No. in season	Title	Directed by	Written by	Original release date	U.S. viewers (millions)
30	1	"The Munsters"	Mark Mylod	Jesse Armstrong	March 26, 2023	0.598
Six months after the events in Tuscany and 48 hours before the GoJo acquisition, Logan celebrates his birthday in New York while Kendall, Shiv, and Roman are in Los Angeles to propose a new media startup to investors. The siblings learn Logan is attempting to purchase PGM again and decide to launch a rival bid. They meet with Nan and Naomi at the Pierces' California estate; Nan is indecisive about the competing offers from Waystar and the siblings, which in turn sparks a bidding war between the factions. The siblings ultimately sway Nan with a $10 billion offer, which Logan is forced to concede. Shiv returns to New York and finds Tom at the apartment they no longer share due to a trial separation. While Tom wants to discuss the breakdown of their marriage, Shiv tells him she wants to divorce him as painlessly as possible.
31	2	"Rehearsal"	Becky Martin	Tony Roche & Susan Soon He Stanton	April 2, 2023	0.481
Logan, who gets to keep control of ATN per the terms of the GoJo sale, visits the newsroom to announce his plans to radically revamp its vision. Stewy and Sandi tell the siblings they want to veto the GoJo acquisition at Waystar's upcoming board meeting to negotiate a price increase. All but Shiv dismiss their proposal and go to spend time with Connor, but Matsson privately calls Kendall to say he will call off the acquisition if pushed on price; Kendall suddenly becomes interested in Stewy and Sandi's offer. Logan meets with his children at a karaoke bar to convince them to allow the GoJo sale to go through, but Kendall and Shiv refuse to make peace with their father. Roman, growing weary of his siblings' desire to spite Logan, visits him at his home, where Logan asks his help in negotiating with Matsson, and offers him a position as head of ATN.
32	3	"Connor's Wedding"	Mark Mylod	Jesse Armstrong	April 9, 2023	0.609
On the day of Connor and Willa's wedding in New York, Logan departs for Sweden with Tom and the rest of his senior cadre (except Gerri and Hugo) to negotiate with Matsson. He decides to fire Gerri for her perceived mishandling of the fallout from the cruises scandal, and tasks a reluctant Roman with delivering her the news at the wedding. However, the siblings soon receive word from Tom that Logan collapsed onboard the plane and is unresponsive. It gradually becomes clear that Logan will not survive; his plane is turned around and he is pronounced dead upon landing. The devastated siblings are forced to coordinate a response alongside the rest of Waystar's executives. Connor and Willa go through with their wedding in a small ceremony, while Kendall, Shiv and Roman travel to Teterboro Airport to receive their father's body and issue a statement announcing his death to the press.
33	4	"Honeymoon States"	Lorene Scafaria	Jesse Armstrong & Lucy Prebble	April 16, 2023	0.695
Shiv is revealed to be pregnant. Logan's family and close associates gather at his apartment for his wake. Hugo approaches Kendall and informs him of a potential insider trading scandal involving his daughter. Frank finds an undated document in Logan's safe naming Kendall as his successor upon his death. Kendall is taken aback by the news while the others debate the document's legitimacy. Since the company's succession plan formally dictated that leadership be passed on to the COO – a title Roman currently holds – Kendall and Roman decide to run the company as co-CEOs. The brothers promise to involve Shiv in all operational decisions, but she feels dejected regardless. Given Kendall's past controversies, Hugo and Karolina propose a PR campaign questioning Logan's judgment leading up to his death, which Roman shuts down. Kendall, however, privately leverages Hugo to go through with the strategy.
34	5	"Kill List"	Andrij Parekh	Jon Brown & Ted Cohen	April 23, 2023	0.652
With Kendall and Roman now running the company, the Roys fly to Norway for GoJo's annual retreat, where they are hoping to finalize the sale to Matsson with a floor of $144 per share. Matsson, however, wishes to absorb ATN into the acquisition as well, which the brothers oppose. Matsson also privately confides to Shiv that he is trying to avoid a potential harassment scandal involving his head of PR, with whom he was romantically linked. Kendall and Roman eventually decide to torpedo the sale by indirectly convincing Matsson to call it off himself. However, Roman lashes out at Matsson during their next meeting for not giving them time to grieve their father, and openly calls off the deal. Matsson then bypasses the brothers and makes an offer directly to Waystar's senior management for $192 per share, which they pass on to the board, though all the senior management except Gerri, Karolina, and Tom are to be fired.
35	6	"Living+"	Lorene Scafaria	Georgia Pritchett & Will Arbery	April 30, 2023	0.847
The Roys return to Los Angeles for Waystar's Investor Day, where they plan to launch "Living+", a luxury assisted living community that Logan had proposed prior to his death. Matsson dislikes the idea and unsuccessfully tries to convince Shiv to call it off, telling her about his hostile negotiation with Kendall and Roman in Norway. Shiv confronts her brothers, who admit they dislike the GoJo deal. Roman impulsively fires the head of Waystar's film studio in light of their latest film's troubled production, and later fires Gerri as well when she reprimands him for it. Shiv and Tom begin to reconnect romantically. Kendall prepares an outlandish presentation for the Living+ product launch, hoping to attract enough investment interest to render the GoJo acquisition untenable. Despite Shiv and Roman's concerns (and Matsson's attempts to sabotage him), he delivers his speech successfully, giving Waystar stock a major boost.
36	7	"Tailgate Party"	Shari Springer Berman & Robert Pulcini	Will Tracy	May 7, 2023	0.739
The night before the presidential election, the Roys host their traditional party for political insiders at Shiv and Tom's apartment. Kendall and Roman hope to build an antitrust case against the GoJo acquisition, but Shiv – who wants to preserve the deal – invites Matsson to the party in hopes of thwarting her brothers. However, the siblings later learn that Matsson has grossly inflated GoJo's subscriber numbers in India, which could create a fatal scandal for the company. Roman unsuccessfully attempts to convince Connor to drop out of the presidential race after his polling numbers draw support away from Mencken. Gerri refuses Roman's request to return to Waystar, having negotiated a hefty severance agreement. Tom is incensed by rumors of his firing circulating at the party, leading to a vicious argument with Shiv about their marriage. Kendall proposes to Frank that Waystar buy GoJo with him as sole CEO.
37	8	"America Decides"	Andrij Parekh	Jesse Armstrong	May 14, 2023	0.746
On election night, the siblings are torn over the candidates: Roman supports Mencken as he will advance Waystar's agenda – including blocking the GoJo deal – while Kendall is uncomfortable with Mencken due to blowback from his extreme politics affecting his daughter Sophie. Shiv, meanwhile, remains aligned with Matsson. Shiv finally tells Tom she is pregnant with his child, but Tom reacts skeptically. A vote center in Milwaukee is firebombed, destroying thousands of ballots that would have likely gone to Democratic candidate Daniel Jiménez; Roman uses the situation to pressure Tom into having ATN prematurely call Wisconsin for Mencken, while Connor concedes to Mencken as well. Kendall ponders backing Jiménez for his family's sake, but learns from Greg that Shiv is working with Matsson; hurt by his sister's betrayal, he throws in his support for Mencken. After Mencken wins Arizona, ATN calls the election in his favor.
38	9	"Church and State"	Mark Mylod	Jesse Armstrong	May 21, 2023	0.789
The Roys arrive at Logan's funeral amidst street protests that have broken out following the announcement of Mencken's win. Shiv advises Matsson to publicize his bogus subscriber counts in India while the news cycle is occupied with the election, and tells her brothers about her pregnancy. Ewan gives a charged eulogy lending insight into Logan's troubled childhood while condemning his brother's corrupt influence. Roman is unable to deliver his speech and breaks down crying, prompting Kendall to give one in his place. Shiv brokers a deal between Matsson and Mencken to allow the GoJo deal to go through in exchange for naming an American CEO, which she hopes will be her. Upon learning this, Kendall enlists Roman and Hugo to join him against Shiv at the final board vote on the acquisition. Roman, overwhelmed with the funeral and ashamed at letting his deal with Mencken backfire, walks into a crowd of rioters and gets assaulted.
39	10	"With Open Eyes"	Mark Mylod	Jesse Armstrong	May 28, 2023	0.896
Kendall scrambles to secure board votes to block the GoJo deal. He and Shiv visit Caroline's estate in Barbados, where Roman is recovering from his wounds. Matsson interviews Tom and offers him the CEO position, believing he will be more obedient than Shiv; Greg tips off the siblings that Shiv will not be Matsson's CEO. The siblings then agree to let Kendall take over, forming a voting bloc. Upon their return to New York, Shiv learns Tom has been chosen as CEO; the siblings race to sway the board. The board comes to a 6–6 tie over selling to GoJo, with only Shiv's vote left; Shiv, however, has second thoughts about Kendall's competence, and votes in favor of the deal despite Kendall's protests. Tom is appointed CEO with Shiv by his side; Roman accepts that he and his siblings were never worthy successors; a devastated Kendall contemplates his future.

== Production ==
=== Development ===
In June 2021, executive producer Georgia Pritchett commented that the series would not go beyond five seasons, and possibly would end after the fourth season. On October 26, 2021, HBO renewed the series for a fourth season. In December 2021, after season 3 had been completed and aired, Succession creator Jesse Armstrong met with executive producers and writers to discuss what shape future seasons would take. Armstrong contemplated splitting the story of season 4 into two separate seasons of six to eight episodes each. Instead, he opted to do "one last full-fat season rather than stretch it out". HBO was "generous" according to Armstrong in being open to more seasons of Succession if he were to take that route but Armstrong wanted to "do something a bit more muscular and complete, and go out sort of strong". Armstrong had been conscious of how the show might end since the development process on season 2 as "there's a promise in the title of Succession" that must be fulfilled in who will succeed Logan Roy at Waystar RoyCo. He "never thought this could go on forever". In an interview with The New Yorker on February 23, 2023, Armstrong confirmed that the series would conclude with the fourth season. He stated that while the season was not initially pitched as the series' last, "the decision to end solidified through the writing and even when we started filming: I said to the cast, 'I'm not a hundred percent sure, but I think this is it.'" The season consists of ten episodes, an increase from the previous season.

=== Casting ===
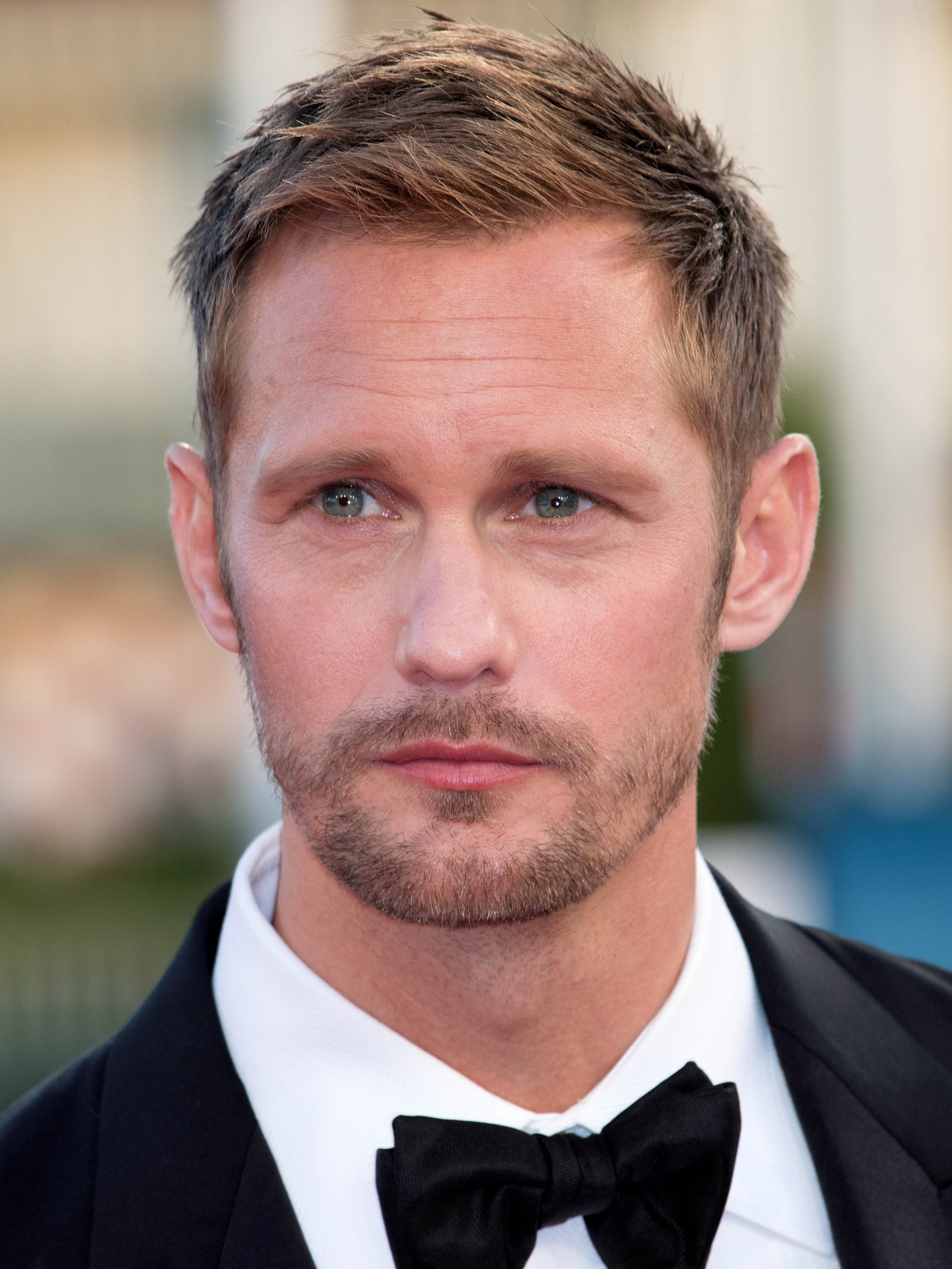
Alexander Skarsgård was promoted to the main cast for the season.

All main cast members return from the previous season, with Hiam Abbass and Arian Moayed, who only appeared in a recurring capacity in the third season, are restored to the main cast in the episodes they appear in. Alexander Skarsgård, who featured in a recurring role in the previous season, was promoted to the main cast for the season, and is also credited for the episodes he appears in only. In January 2023, it was announced that Adam Godley, Annabeth Gish, Eili Harboe and Jóhannes Haukur Jóhannesson had been cast in the fourth season in a recurring capacity. Caitlin FitzGerald was set to return from season 2 as Tabitha Hayes. She was shown in season 4's promotional trailer but her planned appearance was cut in post-production editing.

=== Writing ===
The writing for major story events for the final season of Succession such as the death of Logan Roy were being contemplated during the pre-production on season 3. Logan Roy actor Brian Cox was informed of his character's death by Armstrong prior to the start of production on the fourth season. While Cox was pleased to hear of the decision to kill off Logan and end the show after four seasons, he felt that Logan's death came "too early" in the season and felt "a little bit rejected". Writer Jesse Armstrong decided that Logan Roy should die early in the season rather than in the season finale as it would subvert audience expectations and the inconvenience of it happening during Connor's wedding celebrations adds to the tragedy. Armstrong wanted to show a sudden death in the modern age over a phone call rather than a tragic Shakespearean death. Mark Mylod, director of the episode "Connor's Wedding", highlighted the irony of members of a media empire who have to face the "frustration of trying to get the information" on what is happening with their father.

=== Filming ===
Principal photography for season 4 began in New York City on June 27, 2022, with Mark Mylod directing the first episode. Mylod then directed three more of the ten episodes, with the others being directed by Becky Martin, Lorene Scafaria, Andrij Parekh, Lorene Scafaria, and directing team Shari Springer Berman & Robert Pulcini. Patrick Capone served as cinematographer on 6 episodes and Katelin Arizmendi on 4 episodes. Los Angeles and New York City were the most prominent filming locations in addition to international locations.

Filming for "The Munsters" took place in Los Angeles. The San Onofre Estate in Pacific Palisades, Santa Monica was used as Kendall, Shiv and Roman's base of operations. The $83 million hilltop property has 20,000 square feet of living space. The Peabody Estate in Montecito, which was purchased by former Google CEO Eric Schmidt in 2020, was used as the Pierce family's California home.

Third episode "Connor's Wedding" was filmed on a docked yacht in New York Harbor and took place over the course of 13 days. The centerpiece of the episode is a yacht long take sequence that ran for 27-minutes where the Roy siblings learn over the phone of their father's death. As Succession is captured on 35mm film, the camera could only last 10 minutes before running out of film. To combat this, director Mark Mylod had the crew hide replacement camera magazines around the yacht, so as the camera moved during the scene, the camera could be hastily reloaded without interrupting filming. The actors were given little stage direction to inform their performance. For the scene where Kendall must look for Shiv on the yacht, Jeremy Strong was not told prior to filming where to find his co-star Sarah Snook, and Strong had to remain in character while genuinely searching for her amidst the crowd of extras. A stunt double was used as a stand-in for Brian Cox as there needed to be someone who could handle having their chest compressed for long periods of filming. One shot that visibly showed Logan Roy lying on the floor during chest compressions was created in post-production through compositing Brian Cox's head onto a body double.

In August, Roman Roy actor Kieran Culkin appeared on The Late Show with Stephen Colbert after coming straight from the set of Succession still in costume. Culkin revealed that he had finished filming episodes 2 and 3 by that time and the cast had received early draft scripts for episode 4. "Honeymoon States" was filmed entirely in one location at Logan Roy's apartment at the American Irish Historical Society on Fifth Avenue which had been used since season one.

In October 2022, for the episode "Kill List", filming moved to Møre og Romsdal county and around the town of Åndalsnes in Norway. Locations included the Atlantic Ocean Road, Romsdalen Gondola, Eggen Restaurant, and Juvet Landscape Hotel, as part of a storyline involving Skarsgård's character. Los Angeles and Barbados also served as filming locations for the fourth season.

Sixth episode "Living+" filmed in Los Angeles where the Warner Bros. Studios complex in Burbank stood in for Waystar's studio lot, which Roman visits; Warner Bros. is a subsidiary of Warner Bros. Discovery, the parent company of HBO. Most of "Tailgate Party" was filmed over the course of a week at a penthouse suite known as the "Issroff Residence" in Tower 270 in Tribeca, which has been used as Shiv and Tom's apartment since the series' second season. The siblings' lunch at the start of the episode was filmed on location at Jean-Georges, located inside the Trump International Hotel and Tower. The argument between Shiv and Tom was filmed before the incorporation of Shiv's pregnancy into the plot.

On January 16, 2023, during an interview with Entertainment Weekly, star Matthew Macfadyen stated: "We've got another month or so" left of filming. The final episode "With Open Eyes" was filmed on location in Barbados. The final scene in the episode with Kendall Roy was filmed in Battery Park.

== Marketing ==
On March 2, 2023, a promotional trailer for the season was released, foregrounding the conflict between Logan and his children after the climactic events of season 3. Writing for IGN, Francesca Rivera noted that the trailer mislead viewers by concealing of Logan's death in the third episode of the season, praising the trailer's inclusion of scenes from later episodes in conjunction with Logan's earlier appearances to imply his presence throughout the season. Following the third episode, a mid-season trailer was released to promote the direction of the story following Logan's death.

== Release ==
The season premiered on HBO on March 26, 2023, with episodes released weekly until the finale on May 28, 2023.

=== Home media ===
HBO released the fourth season on DVD on September 12, 2023.

== Reception ==
=== Audience viewership ===
The final episode of the season, the series finale, drew 2.9 million viewers, making it the highest watched episode of the series. This was a 68% increase from the 1.7 million viewers for the third-season finale, which was a record high for the series.

=== Critical response ===
The fourth and final season has been met with widespread critical acclaim. On the review aggregator website Rotten Tomatoes, the season holds an approval rating of 97% with an average rating of 9.2/10, based on 324 reviews. The website's critical consensus reads, "As compulsively watchable as ever, Succession's final season concludes the saga of the backbiting Roy family on a typically brilliant – and colorfully profane – high note." On Metacritic, the season has received a weighted average score of 92 out of 100, based on 31 critics, indicating "universal acclaim".

=== Accolades ===
The fourth and final season of Succession received a leading 27 nominations with six wins at the 75th Primetime Emmy Awards: including Outstanding Drama Series; Kieran Culkin for Outstanding Lead Actor in a Drama Series; Sarah Snook for Outstanding Lead Actress in a Drama Series; Matthew Macfadyen for Outstanding Supporting Actor in a Drama Series; and Jesse Armstrong and Mark Mylod for Outstanding Writing and Directing for a Drama Series, respectively, for the episode "Connor's Wedding". Nominations included Brian Cox and Jeremy Strong for Outstanding Lead Actor in a Drama Series; Nicholas Braun, Alan Ruck, and Alexander Skarsgård for Outstanding Supporting Actor in a Drama Series; J. Smith-Cameron for Outstanding Supporting Actress in a Drama Series; and James Cromwell, Arian Moayed, Hiam Abbass, Cherry Jones, and Harriet Walter all received guest acting nominations. It also received two nominations for Outstanding Directing for a Drama Series, for the episodes "Living+" and "America Decides".

=== Impact on the Murdoch family succession ===
According to a December 2024 Nevada commissioner's report for the state's probate court in the disputed succession of Rupert Murdoch, the depiction of the chaotic aftermath of Logan Roy's death in "Connor's Wedding" in April 2023 prompted Murdoch's children to discuss their own public relations strategy for their father's death. Ultimately the discussions led to Elisabeth Murdoch's trust representative drafting a memorandum to create a plan to avoid a similar scenario from occurring in real life.
