= Church and State (Succession) =

- Succession episode
- Episode no.: Season 4 Episode 9
- Directed by: Mark Mylod
- Written by: Jesse Armstrong
- Cinematography by: Patrick Capone
- Original air date: May 21, 2023
- Running time: 74 minutes

Guest appearances
- Harriet Walter as Lady Caroline Collingwood; Hope Davis as Sandi Furness; Justin Kirk as Jeryd Mencken; Jóhannes Haukur Jóhannesson as Oskar Guðjohnsen; Eili Harboe as Ebba; Natalie Gold as Rava Roy; James Cromwell as Ewan Roy; Zoë Winters as Kerry Castellabate; Scott Nicholson as Colin Stiles; Juliana Canfield as Jess Jordan; Pip Torrens as Peter Munion; Larry Pine as Sandy Furness; Elliot Villar (photograph) as Daniel Jimènez; Swayam Bhatia as Sophie Roy; Quentin Morales as Iverson Roy; Patch Darragh as Ray Kennedy; Brian Hotaling as Mark Rosenstock; Mary Birdsong as Marianne Hirsch; Nicole Ansari-Cox as Sally-Anne

Episode chronology
| ← Previous "America Decides" | Next → "With Open Eyes" |
- Succession season 4

"Church and State" is the ninth and penultimate episode of the fourth and final season of the American satirical comedy-drama television series Succession, and the 38th episode overall. It was written by series creator Jesse Armstrong and directed by Mark Mylod, and originally aired on HBO on May 21, 2023.

Succession centers on the Roy family, the owners of global media and entertainment conglomerate Waystar RoyCo, and their fight for control of the company amidst uncertainty about the health of the family's patriarch Logan (Brian Cox), who has died by this point of the series. The episode follows Logan's funeral, amidst protests against the apparent victory of far-right Republican Jeryd Mencken (Justin Kirk) in the United States presidential election in the previous episode "America Decides". Over the course of the episode, both Kendall (Jeremy Strong) and Shiv (Sarah Snook) continue their attempts to secure their respective positions in the ongoing struggle for power in the wake of Logan's death, while Roman (Kieran Culkin) struggles with grief for his father.

“Church and State" received critical acclaim, with praise for the script, direction, emotional weight and performances of the cast (especially that of Culkin's). For his performance in the episode, Culkin won the Primetime Emmy Award for Outstanding Lead Actor in a Drama Series, winning over both Cox and Strong, also nominated for Succession. The episode was nominated for four Primetime Emmy Awards in totals, including for Outstanding Guest Actress in a Drama Series and Outstanding Guest Actor in a Drama Series for Harriet Walter and James Cromwell's respective performances as Logan's ex-wife Caroline Collingwood and brother Ewan Roy. The episode marked the final appearance of main cast member Hiam Abbass as Logan's third and last wife Marcia Roy.

== Plot ==
The morning after the presidential election, (Note: As depicted in "America Decides".) the Roys prepare for Logan's funeral as protests break out in the streets. Kendall is enraged to learn from Rava that she will be taking the kids upstate to avoid the unrest rather than attend the funeral, and unsuccessfully attempts to stop her from leaving. Kendall is further agitated when he learns that Jess is planning to quit her job as his assistant, which Kendall believes is because of ATN's role in electing Mencken.

Shiv, meanwhile, advises Matsson to release the news of his dubious subscriber counts in India, (Note: As discussed in "Tailgate Party".) given it will receive relatively low coverage due to the election fallout and Logan's funeral. En route to the funeral, she tells Kendall and Roman about her pregnancy. Tom has skipped the funeral to perform post-election damage control at ATN, with The New York Times having published a timeline of events that implicates Tom in the decision to prematurely call the election for Mencken.

At the funeral service, Shiv speaks with Matsson and proposes making a deal with Mencken to allow the GoJo sale through in exchange for Matsson naming an American as Waystar's CEO. Shiv nominates herself, but Matsson is lukewarm, questioning her inexperience and ability to effectively perform while pregnant and as a new mother. Caroline arrives and immediately realizes that Shiv is pregnant. Later, she finds Kerry and introduces her and Marcia to Sally-Anne, Logan's mistress during his marriage to Caroline, and the four women share a moment together.

As the eulogies begin, Ewan goes up to the podium to speak despite Greg and Shiv's attempt to stop him. He lends insight into his and Logan's troubled childhood, including the fact that their aunt and uncle blamed Logan for their sister Rose's death by polio. He then lambasts his brother for his corrupt influence on the world, as well as the people in attendance at the funeral for their lavish lifestyle.

Roman then nervously attempts to give his eulogy, but he becomes overwhelmed on seeing Logan's coffin and breaks down crying, asking to remove the body from the church. His siblings comfort him, and Kendall goes to speak in his place. In an impromptu eulogy, Kendall reflects positively on the "terrible force" of Logan's capitalist ambition, and the impact his success had on the lives of others. Shiv speaks last, describing the precious rarity of receiving love from her cold father as well as the struggles of being the daughter of a man who did not understand women.

The family then goes to Logan's committal at a mausoleum he had purchased. Kendall instructs Hugo to spread rumors of internal opposition within Waystar to the GoJo deal, enlisting him as a key aide in his planned takeover of Waystar.

At a reception after the funeral, Kendall offers to hire Colin as his own bodyguard, then attempts to negotiate with Mencken; however, the meeting is quickly derailed when Greg, Roman, and Connor swarm around him as well. Shiv brings Mencken to meet with Matsson, where the two pitch for the sale to go through with an American CEO. Tom finally arrives at the reception and shares a moment with Shiv and Caroline. Matsson later calls Shiv to report that Mencken has accepted the terms of their deal; Shiv is elated with the prospect of becoming the CEO of Waystar.

Kendall, meanwhile, enlists Roman's aid in working against Shiv at the impending board meeting, where the deal will be finalized. Kendall bluntly tells Roman that he "fucked it" at the funeral and with Mencken. Videos begin to circulate of Roman's breakdown at the funeral. Roman, feeling overwhelmed by the funeral and ashamed of his failure, walks into a crowd of protesters on the street and provokes them into beating him.

== Production ==
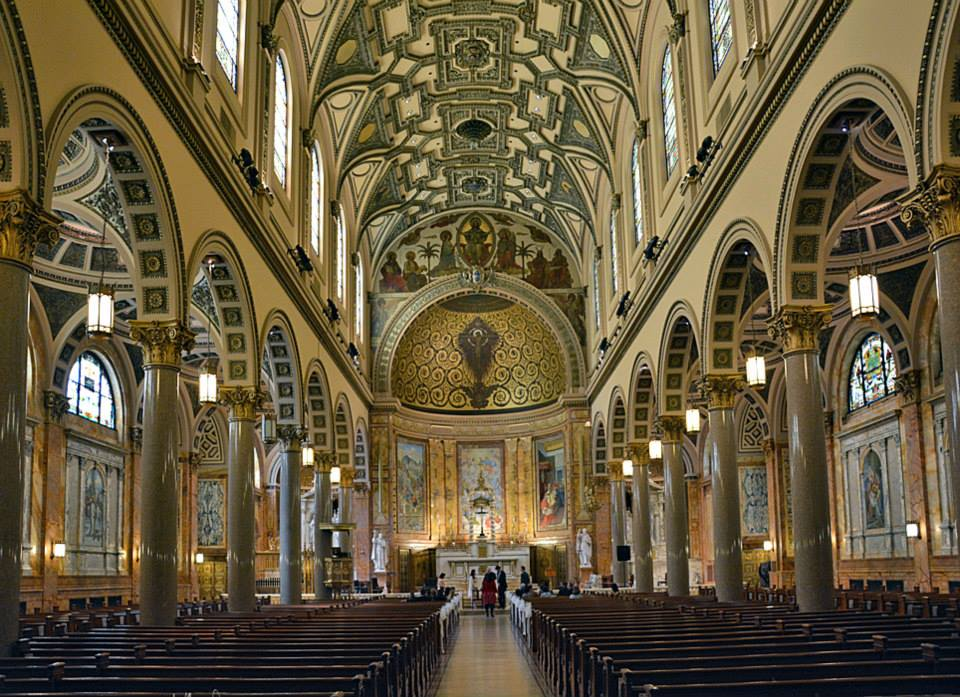
The episode used the Church of St. Ignatius Loyola in New York's Upper East Side to film Logan's funeral service.

"Church and State" was written by Succession creator and showrunner Jesse Armstrong and directed by Mark Mylod in his fifteenth episode for the series.

Logan's funeral Mass was filmed at the Church of St. Ignatius Loyola in New York City, the location reflecting Logan's Catholic faith and located near the character's home on the Upper East Side. The production was given limited time in the church to film the funeral scenes, which contained over 600 extras and comprised most of the script's length; Mylod consequently filmed the sequence as a continuous take using a four-camera setup to maximize coverage – the same technique employed in shooting "Connor's Wedding". The church's pastor, Dennis Yesalonia, consulted on costuming and ritual procedures, and makes a cameo in the episode as the cardinal presiding over Logan's funeral. Similarly, William Villanova, director of the Frank E. Campbell funeral home who also consulted for the series, cameos as Logan's funeral director. Logan's committal service was filmed at Woodlawn Cemetery in The Bronx.

To preserve the secrecy of Logan's death, Mylod recounted that both the scripts and the set dressing for "Church and State" replaced Logan's name with Ewan's. Additionally, actor Brian Cox himself attended the filming of Logan's funeral to mislead onlookers and paparazzi present during the shoot.

Numerous guest stars reprise their roles from prior seasons in the episode, including James Cromwell as Ewan Roy, Harriet Walter as Caroline Collingwood (having filmed in New York for the first time in the series), Pip Torrens as Peter Munion, and Mary Birdsong as Greg's mother Marianne Hirsch, in her first appearance since early in the first season. Additionally, Nicole Ansari-Cox, wife of Brian Cox, appears in the episode as Sally-Anne, a woman with whom Logan had a passionate affair while married to Caroline, as alluded to in earlier episodes. Arian Moayed appeared in publicity material as Stewy, and is credited in the episode's opening titles, but ultimately did not appear.

== Reception ==
=== Critical reception ===
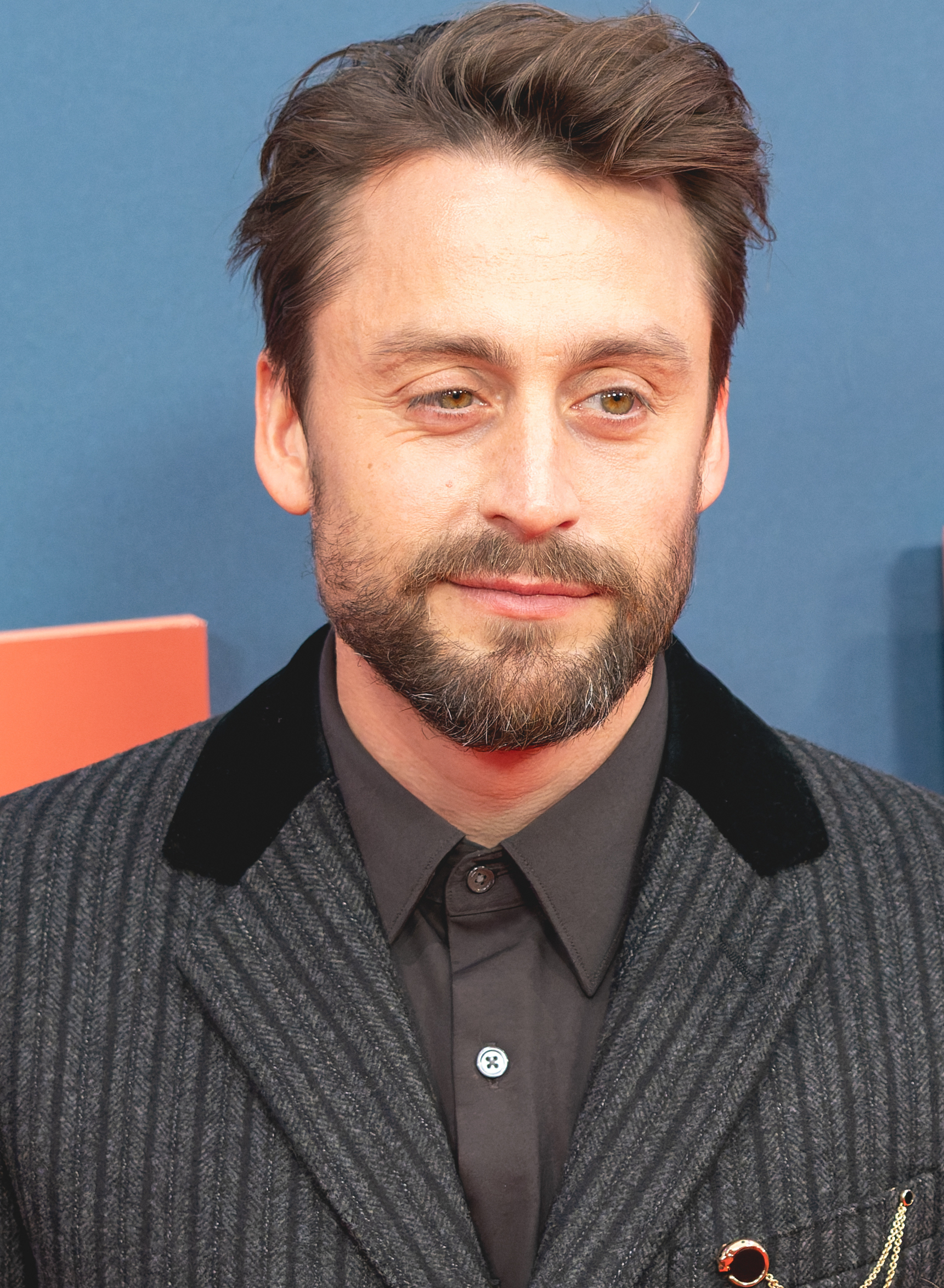
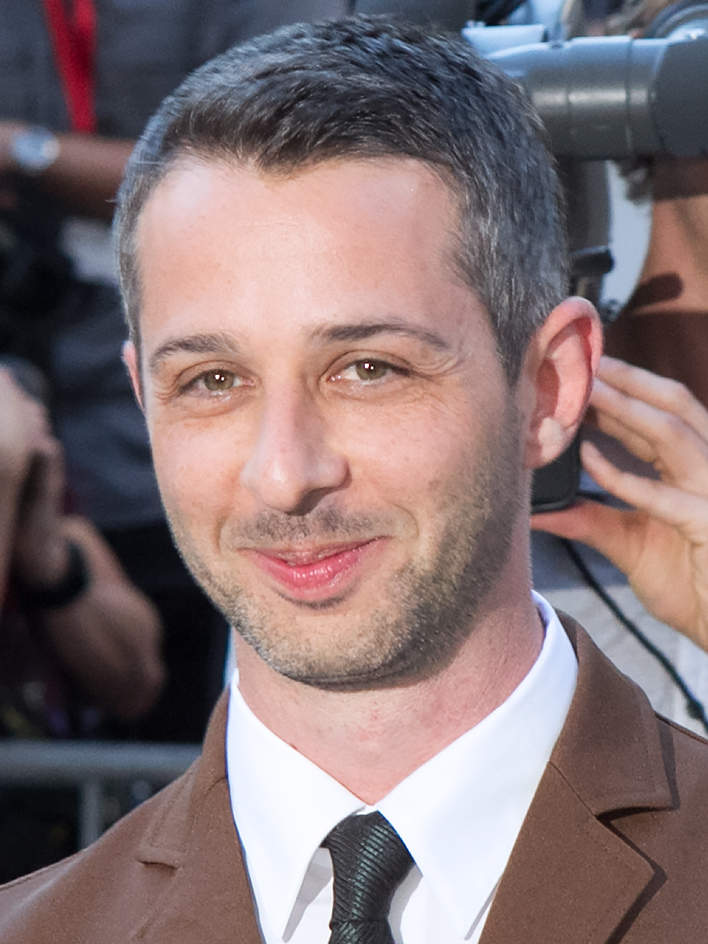
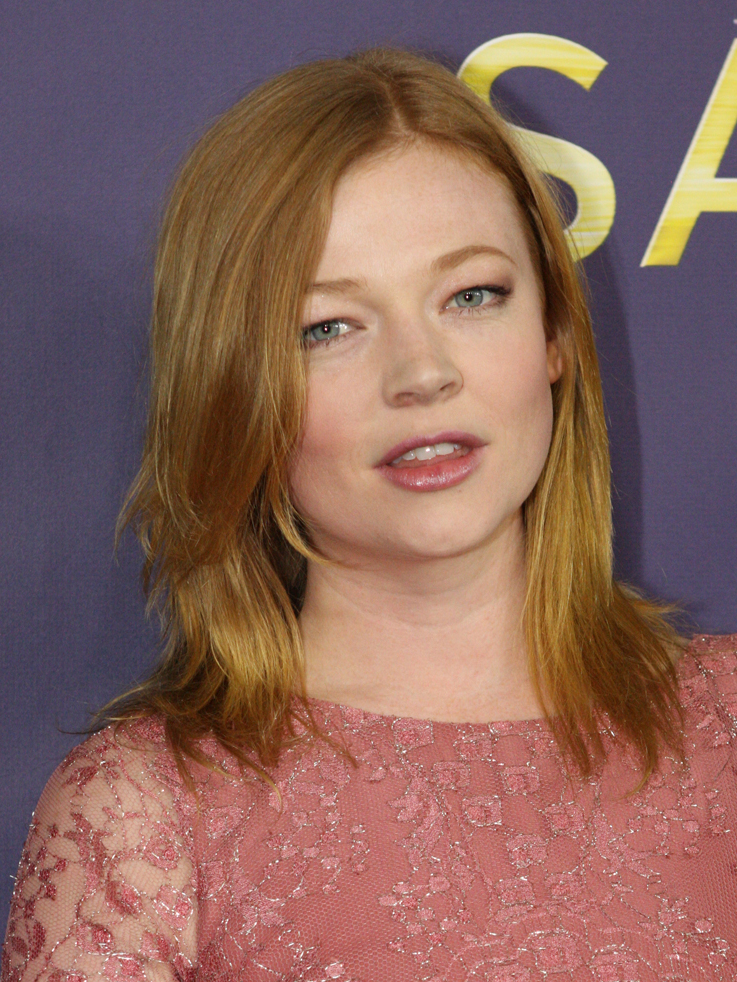
The performances of Kieran Culkin, Jeremy Strong and Sarah Snook received widespread critical acclaim.

"Church and State" received critical acclaim, with reviewers praising Armstrong's script, Mylod's direction, the episode's emotional weight, and the performances of the cast, with several critics calling it one of the best episodes in the series. On the review aggregator Rotten Tomatoes, it holds an approval rating of 100% based on 19 reviews. The website's critical consensus states, "If parting is such sweet sorrow, Succession makes it supremely satisfying as well in a penultimate chapter that lays out the series' emotional stakes with blistering clarity."

Erik Kain of Forbes declared it a "television masterpiece" and one of the best episodes of the series, feeling it used its extended runtime "to perfection". Kain singled out James Cromwell's performance during Ewan's eulogy, describing it as "one of the finest speeches—and performances—we've seen in Succession's four-season run." Scott Tobias of Vulture gave the episode 5 out of 5 stars, praising Armstrong for using Kendall's "incredible" eulogy to "sum up his most important insights about America and Kendall himself", and commending the episode for placing its central familial drama within the context of the country's political turmoil, which he described as "the larger picture of what Logan's legacy has actually wrought".

Noel Murray of The New York Times praised the performances of Culkin, Jeremy Strong and Sarah Snook during the siblings' eulogies – describing Culkin's in particular as "shattering" and Strong's as "riveting and real" – and further praised Mylod's direction for capturing a wide array of reaction shots during the sequence. Both Liz Shannon Miller of Consequence and Philippa Snow of The Independent considered Culkin's performance worthy of an Emmy Award for Lead Actor in a Drama, with the former describing Roman's breakdown as "a searing moment for the character, and a reminder that grief is a monster from which there is no escape." On the other hand, Sophie Gilbert of The Atlantic found Kendall's "soaring, Shakespearean soliloquy" to be an "improbable" moment for the character, writing, "it requires so much suspension of disbelief to consider him an orator of this kind of power."

William Hughes of The A.V. Club gave the episode an A−, praising it as an installment "filled with funny, profoundly human moments", but criticized its "over-long" runtime, feeling its dual plotlines of the funeral and the setup for the series finale "operat[ed] at sometimes frustrating odds with each other." He wrote, "The funeral speeches make for such a gripping emotional climax—with the scene between the four kids at the actual burial as a funny, strangely sweet dénouement—that the realization that there's still another 15 minutes of politicking left to go afterward makes the episode feel strangely lopsided." Ben Travers of IndieWire was more positive, feeling the episode did a "remarkable job setting the table" for the finale, and praised the "piercing precision" of Mylod's direction. Similarly, Alan Sepinwall of Rolling Stone commended Armstrong and Mylod for taking "great advantage of the episode's super-sized running time, giving grace notes to nearly every significant character."

IndieWire named "Church and State" as one of the 25 best TV episodes of 2023.

=== Accolades ===
At the 75th Primetime Emmy Awards, Kieran Culkin submitted this episode to support his nomination for Outstanding Lead Actor in a Drama Series, which he ultimately won.
