= Kill List (Succession) =

- Succession episode
- Episode no.: Season 4 Episode 5
- Directed by: Andrij Parekh
- Written by: Jon Brown; Ted Cohen
- Cinematography by: Patrick Capone
- Original air date: April 23, 2023
- Running time: 60 minutes

Guest appearances
- Jóhannes Haukur Jóhannesson as Oskar Guðjohnsen; Eili Harboe as Ebba; Juliana Canfield as Jess Jordan; Patch Darragh as Ray Kennedy; Scott Nicholson as Colin Stiles; Christian Rubeck as Andreas Bloc; Kristofer Kamiyasu as Rasmus; KeiLyn Durrel Jones as Remi; Brian Hotaling as Mark Rosenstock

Episode chronology
← Previous "Honeymoon States"	Next → "Living+"
- Succession season 4

"Kill List" is the fifth episode of the fourth season of the American satirical comedy-drama television series Succession, and the 34th episode overall. It was written by Jon Brown and Ted Cohen and directed by Andrij Parekh, and originally aired on HBO on April 23, 2023.

The episode follows the Roys traveling to Norway for GoJo's annual corporate retreat, where they hope to finalize the acquisition deal with Lukas Matsson.

The episode received critical acclaim, with reviewers praising the episode's script, location choices, direction, and performances (particularly Culkin's). For his performance in the episode, Alexander Skarsgård was nominated for the Primetime Emmy Award for Outstanding Supporting Actor in a Drama Series.

== Plot ==
Kendall arrives at Waystar for his first day as co-CEO with Roman. The company learns GoJo wants Waystar's entire executive team to attend their annual corporate retreat in Norway to assess their "cultural fit", which the old guard takes as a sign that Matsson is indeed interested in going through with the acquisition; however, the siblings see it as an affront given the recent death of their father. The Roys' price minimum is $144 per share.

In Norway, however, Matsson surprises Kendall and Roman with an offer of $187 per share for Waystar's whole operation—including ATN, which was not part of the original terms. Kendall and Roman are uncomfortable selling their father's prized possession while the senior team is eager to push the sale through for the increased price. Shiv also informs her brothers that ATN is colluding with Jeryd Mencken's presidential campaign; she is content to give ATN up due to the network's right-wing politics and the potential scandal that would arise if news of the collusion was leaked.

Later in the day, the two sides sit down together over a meal. Tom and Greg attempt to gain favor with the GoJo team, while the other Waystar executives - particularly Hugo - take antagonistic approaches to their counterparts. The siblings attempt to renegotiate the terms of the deal with Matsson so they can keep ATN, arguing that he fundamentally misunderstands its value, but Matsson refuses to budge. Roman eventually agrees to pass on his offer to the board, but that night, Kendall tells Roman he wants to torpedo the entire deal so the two of them can continue running Waystar. Roman is initially apprehensive defying his father's dying wish, but eventually agrees; neither of them inform Shiv. They agree that Matsson must be manipulated into backing out of the deal himself since either of them calling it off would violate their fiduciary duty to shareholders and consequently get them fired by the board. Kendall later tasks Greg with leaking to the press that Waystar and GoJo's teams are not getting along, hoping to place pressure on Matsson to back out of an acquisition.

Shiv, meanwhile, meets privately with Matsson, who reveals that he was romantically involved with Ebba, his head of PR, but that after the relationship soured, he repeatedly sent her half a liter of his own frozen blood. Shiv, both disturbed and amused, advises him on how to avoid a public scandal and recommends him to Gerri. Matsson tells Shiv he enjoys her company and that she reminds him of Logan.

The next morning, Kendall and Roman ride a cable car to meet Matsson atop a mountain; Roman is unsettled when Connor, who is planning Logan's funeral, sends him an image of Logan's corpse. On the mountain, Matsson, who has deduced the brothers' attempts to botch the deal, confronts them, telling them their father would be embarrassed by their incompetence, and threatening to bypass them by going directly to Waystar's senior brass to see the deal through. Roman snaps and berates Matsson for summoning them to the retreat mere days after Logan's death, and openly calls off the deal. Matsson, however, is amused, claiming Roman has played into his hands.

On the return flight, the company learns Matsson has made a new offer of $192 per share; Matsson delivers the offer through Frank and refuses to speak directly with Roman and Kendall. The senior executives are elated and immediately pass the offer on to the board. They applaud Kendall and Roman, unaware they were actually trying to ruin the deal. However, they learn that Matsson plans to retain most of his own executive team rather than Waystar's, with only Tom, Gerri, and Karolina getting to keep their jobs. Matsson calls Shiv and asks her to send him a photo of her brothers' dismayed faces. Shiv then tasks Tom with firing Cyd for conspiring with Mencken's campaign and invites him to dinner upon their return home.

== Production ==
=== Writing ===
"Kill List" was written by Jon Brown and Ted Cohen and directed by Andrij Parekh. It is Brown's fourth writing credit and Cohen's second, and Parekh's fifth episode as a director. Parekh characterized the overseas-set episode as a "double whammy of [the characters] not being in their own element, but also emotionally being on the back foot, with the patriarch having passed away."

Nicholas Quah of Vulture felt the episode's characterization of Lukas Matsson evoked Minecraft creator Markus "Notch" Persson, suggesting Matsson lived in "a constant swirl of apathy and exasperation" that echoed Persson's own accounts of his wealth-induced depression and loneliness. Quah also inferred that Persson's controversial political views and matching background as a Swedish tech billionaire were other points of reference for the Matsson character. Actor Alexander Skarsgård stated, "I don't think he's driven by greed or the need to accumulate more wealth. (...) He's very competitive -- just like a game, any other game. It happened to be about a multibillion-dollar company acquisition. But for him, it's like any other game."

=== Filming ===
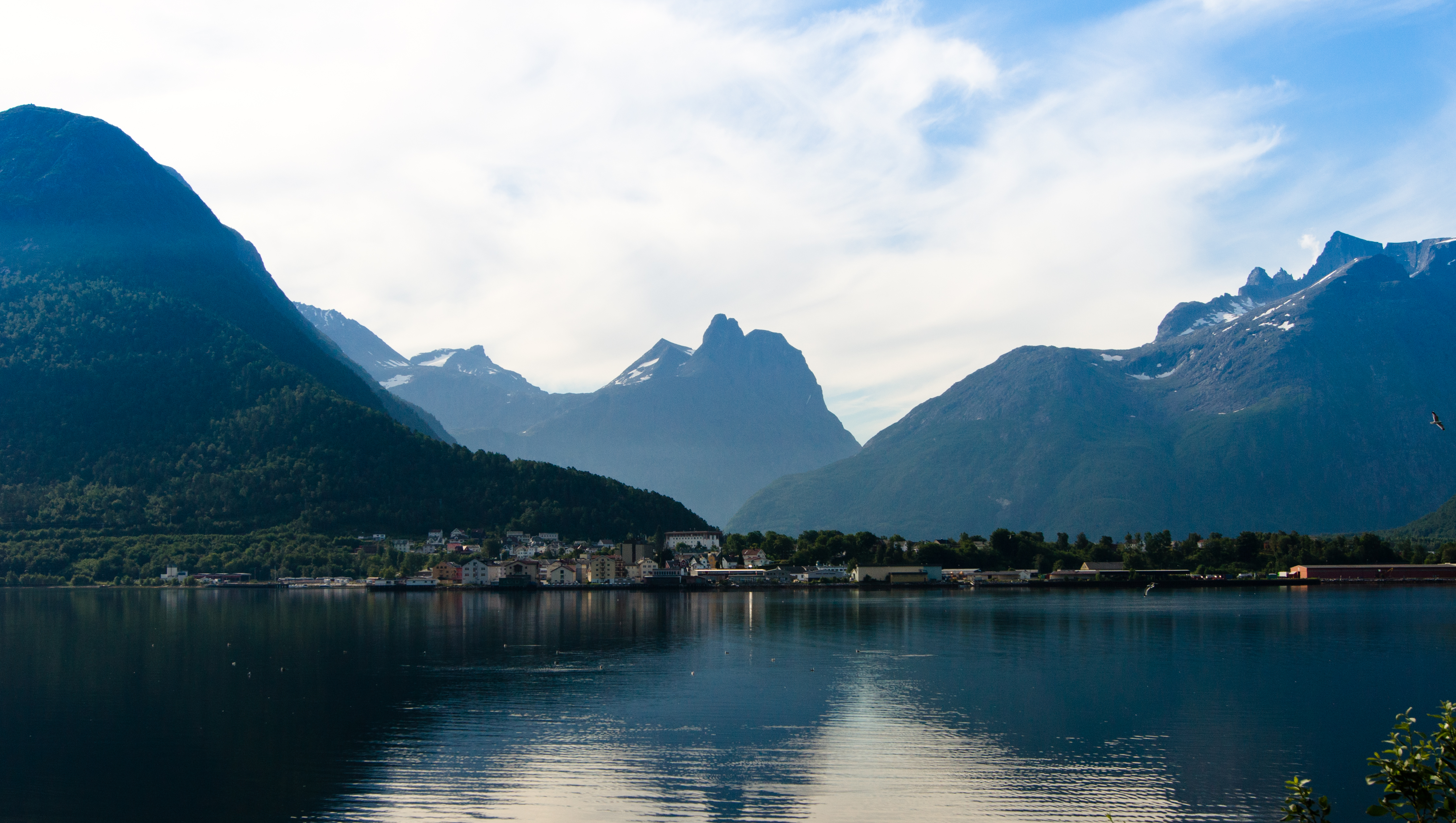
"Kill List" was primarily filmed in and around Åndalsnes, Norway.

The series filmed on location in Norway's Møre og Romsdal county for the episode, primarily around the town of Åndalsnes. Executive producer Scott Ferguson recounted that a Scandinavian setting was part of Succession creator Jesse Armstrong's vision for the series' tech-company storyline; Norway was chosen for its "remarkable architecture" and exceptional landscape", as well as practicalities it afforded to the filming schedule, such as the proximity of an airport to key production locations.

Filming locations included the Juvet Landscape Hotel — featured prominently in film Ex Machina and serving here as both Kendall and Roman's living quarters and a stand-in for Matsson's home — as well as Eggen Restaurant and the Romsdalen Gondola, the latter being the only form of transport to the restaurant. The restaurant sits atop Nesaksla Mountain, where Kendall and Roman's final negotiation with Matsson was filmed. The episode also features numerous landscape shots of the surrounding Geirangerfjord, as well as establishing shots filmed on both the Atlantic Ocean Road and Trollstigen, a mountainside road known for its steep hairpin bends.

The episode's opening scene is a callback to the series' pilot episode, which also depicts Kendall listening to rap music on his way to work.

== Reception ==
=== Critical reception ===
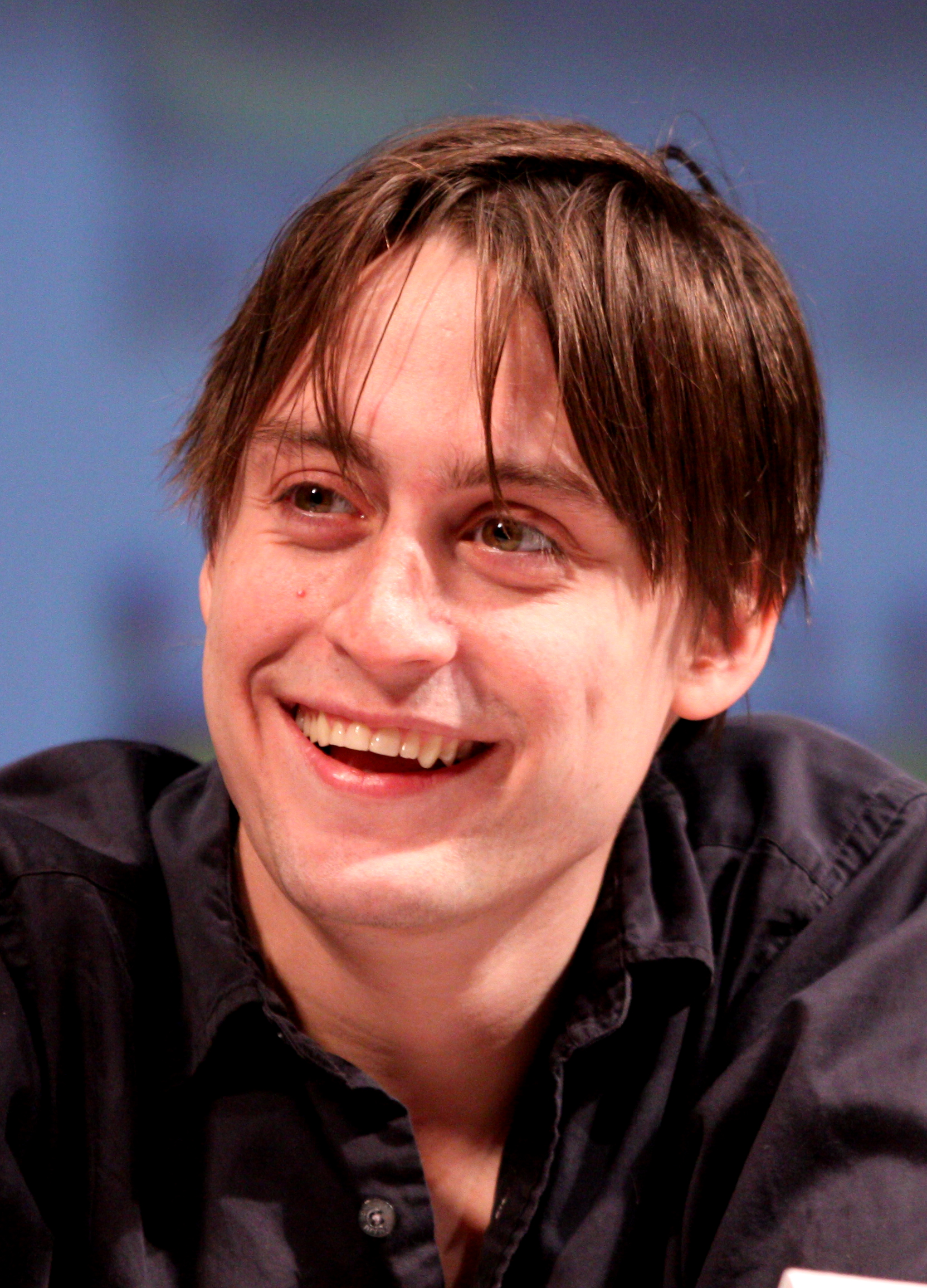
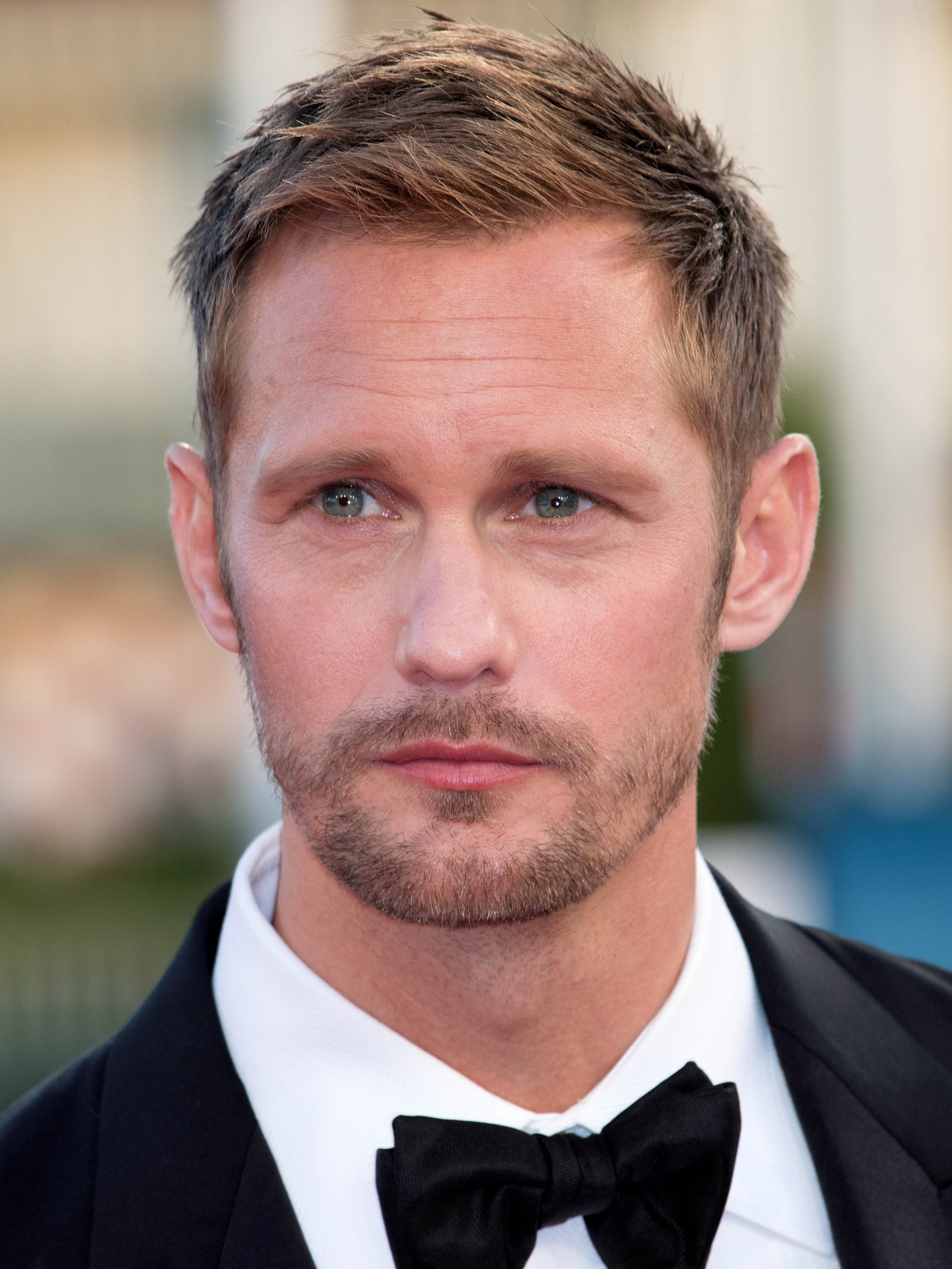
The performances of Kieran Culkin and Alexander Skarsgård were highly praised by critics.

"Kill List" received critical acclaim, with reviewers praising the episode's script, location choices, direction, and performances (particularly Kieran Culkin's). On the review aggregator Rotten Tomatoes, it holds an approval rating of 100% based on 17 reviews. The website's critical consensus states, "Alexander Skarsgård's sly performance looms large in "Kill List," a scenically gorgeous installment that dives headfirst into the ugliness of putting a price on legacy."

William Hughes of The A.V. Club gave the episode an A, calling it "a disruptive, aggressively funny hour of TV that leaves no one in an especially secure position." Hughes praised Skarsgård's portrayal of Matsson as "a person that no member of the Roy family has any capacity to hurt", feeling the episode spotlighted the actor's "gift for comedy". He also praised Sarah Snook for capturing Shiv's skill for "managing and riding the waves of insecurity of yet another rich, emotionally broken man," as well as Culkin's "raw, emotionally affecting performance" in his final scene opposite Skarsgård. Vulture's Scott Tobias gave the episode 5 out of 5 stars, calling it "entertainingly nasty" and comparing it to the second season's "Tern Haven" for the way it "gets plenty of comic mileage out of the clash between corporate cultures." Similar to Hughes, Tobias described Roman's outburst as "one of Culkin's rawest moments on the show."

Ben Travers of IndieWire gave the episode an A−, noting the effectiveness of Parekh's "smart framing" and Skarsgård's "physical performance" in his scenes opposite Culkin and Jeremy Strong. He described Roman's outburst as "glorious, and handled exquisitely by Culkin", and praised how the episode raised the stakes for the second half of the season. Noel Murray of The New York Times wrote that Culkin "delivers one of his best performances of the series", and called attention to the episode's "spectacular location". Alan Sepinwall of Rolling Stone praised the episode's cringe comedy, describing its depiction of the characters' desperation as "palpable" and "unbearable", and called Culkin's monologue "spectacularly performed".

=== Accolades ===
TVLine named Culkin as the "Performer of the Week" for the week of April 29, 2023, for his performance in the episode. The site wrote, "Culkin captured that heartbreaking truth as Roman quietly stewed all episode long... until Matsson called Logan 'a prick' during a mountaintop confrontation, triggering a violent rush of defensiveness deep inside Roman to spill out everywhere. Culkin's voice grew strained and high-pitched as Roman lashed out at Matsson for disrespecting his father and not giving them time to grieve. [...] It was a devastating portrait of how grief can make us act out in self-destructive ways, and Culkin reminded us that Roman is much more than just a source of funny zingers."

At the 75th Primetime Emmy Awards, Alexander Skarsgård submitted this episode to support his nomination for Outstanding Supporting Actor in a Drama Series.
