= Honeymoon States =

- Succession episode
- Episode no.: Season 4 Episode 4
- Directed by: Lorene Scafaria
- Written by: Jesse Armstrong; Lucy Prebble
- Cinematography by: Katelin Arizmendi
- Original air date: April 16, 2023
- Running time: 59 minutes

Guest appearances
- Hope Davis as Sandi Furness; Stephen Root as Ron Petkus; Jeannie Berlin as Cyd Peach; Jóhannes Haukur Jóhannesson (voice) as Oskar Guðjohnsen; Zoë Winters as Kerry Castellabate; Scott Nicholson as Colin Stiles; Zack Robidas as Mark Ravenhead; Larry Pine as Sandy Furness; Patch Darragh as Ray Kennedy; Cynthia Mace as Sylvia; Brian Hotaling as Mark Rosenstock

Episode chronology
← Previous "Connor's Wedding"	Next → "Kill List"
- Succession season 4

"Honeymoon States" is the fourth episode of the fourth season of the American satirical comedy-drama television series Succession, and the 33rd overall. It was written by series creator Jesse Armstrong and Lucy Prebble and directed by Lorene Scafaria, and originally aired on HBO on April 16, 2023.

Succession centers on the Roy family, the owners of global media and entertainment conglomerate Waystar RoyCo, and their fight for control of the company amidst uncertainty about the health of the family's patriarch Logan (Brian Cox). The episode takes place during the wake of Logan following his death in the previous episode "Connor's Wedding"; while his family is in mourning, they must make strategic moves with and against each other and company higher-ups in the lead-up to determining who will take over as interim CEO.

"Honeymoon States" received critical acclaim, with reviewers praising its script, performances, and humor. For their performances in the episode, Arian Moayed and Hiam Abbass were nominated for the Primetime Emmy Awards for Outstanding Guest Actor in a Drama Series and Outstanding Guest Actress in a Drama Series respectively.

== Plot ==
The morning after Logan's death, (Note: As depicted in "Connor's Wedding".) Shiv learns from her doctor that an amniocentesis she had previously scheduled confirms a healthy pregnancy, while a sleep-deprived Kendall joins his family and Logan's close associates at Logan's apartment for his wake. Kendall is surprised to see Marcia upon arriving; she insists she and Logan remained in touch after their separation, speaking "intimately" every day. While the siblings reunite, Tom meets with Frank, Karl, and Gerri to discuss who to name interim CEO to the board later that day. Tom is quickly ruled out as an option; he later unsuccessfully attempts to curry favor with Kendall and Roman.

Roman declines a call from Matsson until the siblings are unified on their position regarding the GoJo acquisition. Upon calling Matsson back, however, the siblings are only able to reach his assistant Oskar Guðjohnsen, who tells them GoJo cannot call off their annual company retreat, and that the siblings will have to fly overseas the next day if they want to negotiate with Matsson directly. Connor, meanwhile, negotiates with Marcia to buy Logan's apartment for $63 million. Hugo later pulls Kendall aside and confides that his daughter Juliet sold her Waystar shares prior to news of Logan's death going public.

Frank finds a document in Logan's safe which appears to name Kendall as CEO upon his death; however, the document is undated, and it is unclear whether Kendall's name is underlined or crossed out. Frank, Karl and Gerri wish to dismiss the document as illegitimate, noting that Logan's choosing of a successor has no legal force, but decide to tell the siblings. Kendall is clearly taken aback by the news and privately laments to Frank that he regrets disappointing his father, but Frank comforts him. Roman and Shiv are dispirited at not being named successor, but agree that as Logan's children, they would prefer to have one of them leading the company rather than Logan's old guard. Tom takes Shiv aside to comfort her about Logan's death, and reminisces about their initial courtship. Shiv doesn't tell him about her pregnancy.

The family receives word that Jeryd Mencken wants to attend the wake, and conservative donor Ron Petkus (Note: Last seen in "What It Takes".) makes a toast in Logan's honor; Stewy, Sandi, and her father arrive as well. Kerry arrives in tears to pick up some belongings from Logan's home, and discreetly tells Roman that she and Logan were discussing getting married. Marcia, however, has Kerry swiftly escorted out. Kendall finds his siblings unwilling to discuss the terms of his takeover, and asks Stewy to advocate on his behalf.

Kendall then has a sitdown with Shiv and Roman to talk leadership, and is receptive to their concerns regarding his competence. Roman recalls that Waystar's draft succession plan dictates that leadership be passed down to the COO - a title he currently holds. Kendall and Roman agree to run the company together, since Shiv lacks relevant experience, but promise the skeptical Shiv that they will involve her in all operational decisions. The siblings announce the decision to Waystar's senior executives, with Stewy present to endorse Kendall; the board approves the decision shortly thereafter. Shiv nonetheless feels dejected, and embarrasses herself when she trips and falls in front of other guests.

Hugo and Karolina pull aside Kendall and Roman to discuss the PR strategy for announcing their takeover. Given Kendall's string of company-related controversies, Hugo proposes that they draft a statement casting doubt on Logan's judgment in the time leading up to his death, even suggesting that they invoke sordid details such as his abusive parenting, to make it appear that his sons were already running the company toward the end of Logan's life. Roman is disgusted by the idea and immediately shuts it down. However, Kendall later approaches Hugo privately and uses his knowledge of his daughter's insider trading to blackmail Hugo into going ahead with the more aggressive PR strategy without Roman's or Karolina's knowledge. He argues that his father would have done the same.

== Production ==
"Honeymoon States" was written by series creator and showrunner Jesse Armstrong alongside playwright and executive producer Lucy Prebble, in her first writing credit for the series since the first season's "Austerlitz". It was directed by filmmaker Lorene Scafaria, her second episode for the series after season 3's "Too Much Birthday". Scafaria cited the work of Ingmar Bergman and Eugene O'Neill as inspirations for her approach to the episode, which she likened to an "ensemble play" due to it taking place entirely in a single location.

Hiam Abbass returns as Marcia Roy in the episode, credited in the opening titles of the episode among the main cast. Justin Kirk filmed scenes as Jeryd Mencken for the episode, which were included in the season trailer but ultimately cut from the final edit of the episode.

The series writers initially rejected their consideration to have Shiv become pregnant during the season, but reconsidered their decision later in the production cycle when actor Sarah Snook herself became pregnant. Scafaria returned to direct an additional scene for the opening of "Honeymoon States", where Shiv is informed of her pregnancy, in January 2023.

According to actor Peter Friedman (Frank), the pencil addendums on Logan's letter were added by Armstrong himself.

== Reception ==
=== Ratings ===
Across all platforms, the episode was watched by 2.6 million viewers upon airing, thereby surpassing "Connor's Wedding" as the most-watched episode of the series to date. On linear television, the episode was watched by 0.695 million viewers, with an 18-49 rating of 0.17.

=== Critical reception ===
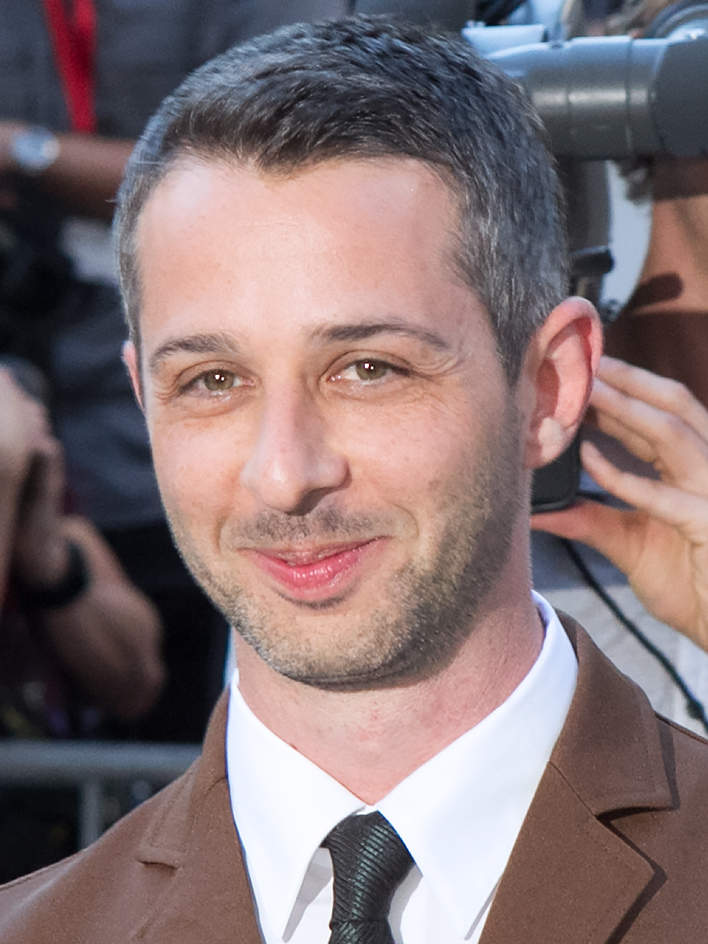
Jeremy Strong's performance in the episode was highly praised by critics.

"Honeymoon States" received critical acclaim, with reviewers praising its script, performances, and humor. On the review aggregator Rotten Tomatoes, it holds an approval rating of 100% based on 18 reviews. The website's critical consensus states, "Mourning gives way to new machinations in "Honeymoon States," a brutally efficient resetting of the board that plops Succession's ensemble into a single location and lets them scheme to scintillating effect."

William Hughes of The A.V. Club gave the episode an A−, feeling the episode excelled as "a comedy piece, the harrowing tragedy of Logan Roy's death last week now revisited as farce." Hughes called Sarah Snook the episode's "dramatic MVP" and further praised the supporting performances of Hiam Abbass, David Rasche, Peter Friedman and Fisher Stevens. However, Hughes expressed concern about the series' "narrative backsliding" in light of the implied fracture amongst the siblings at the end of the episode. Scott Tobias of Vulture gave the episode 5 out of 5 stars, calling it "absolutely delicious" and praising Armstrong and Prebble's script for "turn[ing] to simple, elegant devices to serve as a fulcrum for the drama." Tobias also praised the episode's comedic tone, and singled out Matthew Macfadyen for portraying Tom "reverting back to the humility of courtship rather than the familiarity of a broken marriage" during his talk with Shiv.

Several critics praised the episode's humorous pivot following the third episode's focus on grief. Noel Murray of The New York Times called the episode "one of the funniest of the series, filled with quotable lines and sick burns", and praised the ways in which it drew parallels between Kendall and Logan. Linda Holmes of NPR singled out the scenes between the siblings in the episode for praise, as well as Arian Moayed's performance as Stewy. Alan Sepinwall of Rolling Stone praised the episode for "trend[ing] back toward black comedy, a mode in which this series operates spectacularly well." He commended the episode's examination of the characters' greed in the wake of tragedy, and called the episode overall "sharp and funny — and, at times, sad — enough to suggest that this post-Logan version of Succession will be different but the same in a very, very good way."
