= Tailgate Party (Succession) =

- Succession episode
- Episode no.: Season 4 Episode 7
- Directed by: Robert Pulcini & Shari Springer Berman
- Written by: Will Tracy
- Cinematography by: Patrick Capone
- Original air date: May 7, 2023
- Running time: 61 minutes

Guest appearances
- Natalie Gold as Rava Roy; Ashley Zukerman as Nate Sofrelli; Justin Kirk (photograph) as Jeryd Mencken; Jóhannes Haukur Jóhannesson as Oskar Guðjohnsen; Eili Harboe as Ebba; Mark Linn-Baker as Maxim Pierce; Scott Nicholson as Colin Stiles; Elliot Villar (photograph) as Daniel Jiménez

Episode chronology
← Previous "Living+"	Next → "America Decides"
- Succession season 4

"Tailgate Party" is the seventh episode of the fourth season of the American satirical comedy-drama television series Succession, and the 36th episode overall. It was written by Will Tracy and directed by Shari Springer Berman and Robert Pulcini, and originally aired on HBO on May 7, 2023.

Succession centers on the Roy family, the owners of global media and entertainment conglomerate Waystar RoyCo, and their fight for control of the company amidst uncertainty about the health of the family's patriarch Logan (Brian Cox), who has passed away by this point of the series. The episode is set during a party thrown by Shiv (Sarah Snook) and Tom (Matthew Macfadyen) at their apartment for major business and political figures the night before the United States presidential election, and sees the continuation of the past few episodes' storyline, in which Kendall (Jeremy Strong) and Roman (Kieran Culkin) attempt to sabotage the GoJo deal they have been negotiating with Lukas Matsson (Alexander Skarsgård).

The episode received critical acclaim, with praise for the script and performances of Snook and Macfadyen, who respectively won the Primetime Emmy Award for Outstanding Lead Actress in a Drama Series and the Primetime Emmy Award for Outstanding Supporting Actor in a Drama Series for the episode.

== Plot ==
One day before the presidential election, Shiv and Tom prepare to host the Roys' traditional pre-election party for business and political insiders at their apartment; Matsson declines the invitation. Kendall learns from Rava that their daughter Sophie felt threatened by an encounter with an ATN viewer. The siblings meet for lunch to plan Logan's funeral; there, none of them volunteer to give a speech at the funeral. However, Kendall and Roman get Shiv's permission to invite Nate to the party, hoping to use his bipartisan connections with lawmakers to amass a regulatory push against GoJo's acquisition of Waystar. After her brothers leave, Shiv calls Matsson and demands his presence at the party to prevent her brothers from sabotaging the deal.

Tom has Greg lay off hundreds of ATN employees before arriving at the party. Roman learns Connor's polling numbers are redirecting support from Mencken, and attempts to convince Connor to drop out of the race, offering him an ambassadorship under Mencken's administration, but Connor refuses. Kendall makes a toast in Logan's honor; Matsson appears in the middle of a moment of silence, having brought Oskar and Ebba with him. Shiv takes Matsson to network with the guests in order to secure support for the acquisition; he implies to Nate that Tom will be fired from his leadership of ATN once the deal goes through. Shiv does not dissuade this news, which begins spreading around the party.

Kendall attempts to enlist Nate's help in building a regulatory case against GoJo, offering that ATN sympathetically covers Nate's candidate Daniel Jiménez in his first 100 days in exchange. Nate, however, is uncomfortable accepting a bribe and leaves the party. Roman, meanwhile, learns of Matsson's harassment case involving Ebba, which he and Kendall see as further ammunition against Matsson. Shiv asks for Matsson's assurance that she will retain a major role at the company under his leadership, to which he remains noncommittal.

After a dispute at the party between Matsson and Ebba, Kendall and Roman learn from Ebba that her relationship with Matsson is in fact the least of his scandals: she reveals that he outsourced most of GoJo's code despite claiming to have written it himself - his public persona largely PR-constructed - and that he has grossly inflated the company's subscriber count in India. Matsson admits the latter to Shiv but believes the scandal will perish amidst the high-profile acquisition. Kendall, now emboldened by this news, verbally spars with Matsson in front of onlookers, leading the GoJo team to leave the party with Greg, whom they have taken a liking to.

Roman finds Gerri and apologizes for firing her, passing it off as an overreaction, but she refuses to return to Waystar, having already negotiated a hefty severance agreement that includes no negative publicity around her exit. She threatens to sue Roman and publicize the explicit photos he sent to her (Note: As depicted in "Chiantishire".) if her demands are not met.

Tom takes Shiv to talk privately on their balcony, where he chastises her for allowing rumors of his firing to spread throughout the party. Shiv insists it was merely a move to appease shareholders ahead of the acquisition, but confides her fear that Matsson's many scandals jeopardize her family's future. Tom claims Shiv will survive because of her opportunism, prompting a vicious argument between the two about their marriage. Shiv accuses Tom of only marrying her for power and status and blames his betrayal in Italy (Note: As depicted in "All the Bells Say".) for the time she did not get to spend with Logan in the final months of his life. Tom insists he genuinely loves Shiv, but rebukes her for her infidelity, her refusal to have his child, and for standing idle during his near-imprisonment; he tells her she is "incapable of love" and unfit to be a mother. Shiv leaves without telling Tom about her pregnancy.

Kendall, meanwhile, privately suggests to Frank that Waystar buy GoJo with him as the sole CEO. Roman offers to his siblings to deliver the eulogy at Logan's funeral. Shiv and Tom spend the night in separate beds, neither of them able to sleep.

== Production ==
=== Writing ===
"Tailgate Party" was written by Will Tracy and directed by Shari Springer Berman and Robert Pulcini. It is both Tracy's third writing credit and Berman and Pulcini's third directorial credit for the series.

According to actress Sarah Snook, series creator Jesse Armstrong was primarily influenced by Who's Afraid of Virginia Woolf? in approaching the episode's Shiv-Tom material, drawing upon the premise of an unhappily married couple having to "maintain a good front" to guests at a party. Alexander Skarsgård likened Matsson's role at the party to "throwing a golden hand grenade into a room full of grey suits", having worked with costume designer Jonathan Schwartz to develop Matsson's wardrobe in the episode. Regarding the episode's reveal that Matsson's persona is largely PR-constructed, the actor disagreed with the implication that Matsson is an outright fraud, describing the character as an adherent of Facebook's motto of "move fast and break things" and suggesting his success owed to his "relentless" and "fearless" approach to business. Skarsgård recounted how he and Snook worked together to incorporate a "weird gray zone [of] sexual tension" in the rapport between Shiv and Matsson.

=== Filming ===
Most of the episode was filmed over the course of a week at a penthouse suite known as the "Issroff Residence" in Tower 270 in Tribeca, which has been used as Shiv and Tom's apartment since the series' second season. The siblings' lunch at the start of the episode was filmed on location at Jean-Georges, located inside the Trump International Hotel and Tower. The argument between Shiv and Tom was filmed before the incorporation of Shiv's pregnancy into the plot.

== Reception ==
=== Critical reception ===
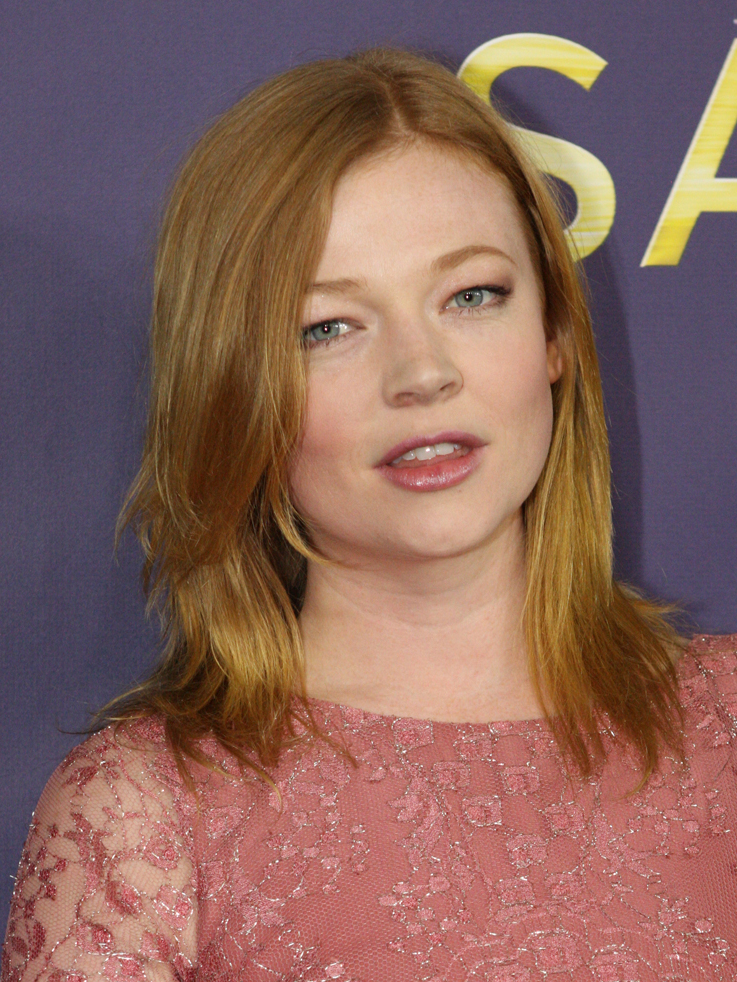
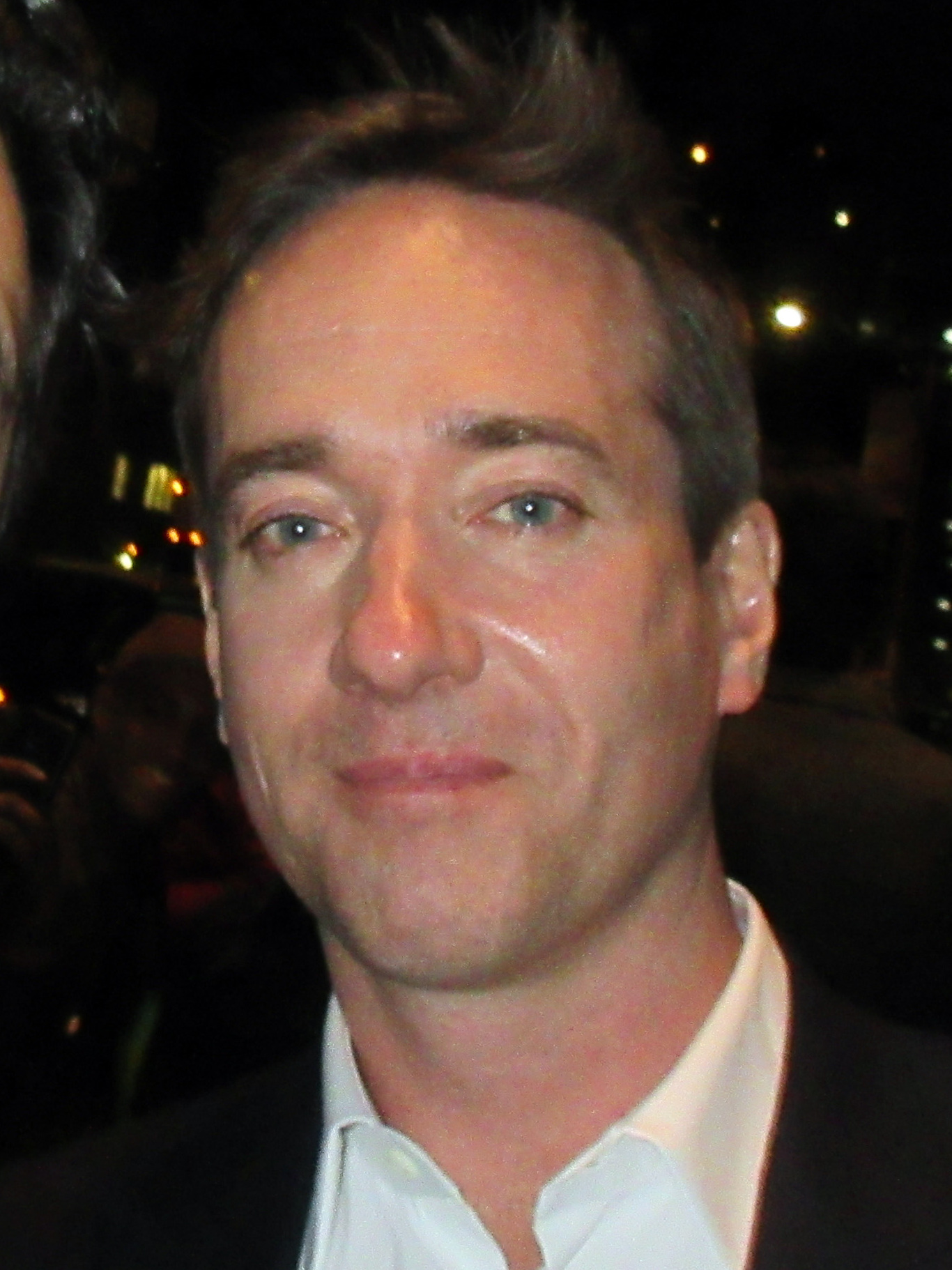
Sarah Snook and Matthew Macfadyen's performances in the episode received widespread acclaim, with both of them winning Primetime Emmy Awards for their performances.

"Tailgate Party" received critical acclaim, with reviewers praising Tracy's script and the performances of Sarah Snook and Matthew Macfadyen. On the review aggregator Rotten Tomatoes, it holds an approval rating of 100% based on 16 reviews. The website's critical consensus states, "Presenting scenes from a marriage that culminate in the ultimate blowup, "Tailgate Party" dishes out plenty of hors d'oeuvres with the Roy clan's backstabbing, but the main course is Sarah Snook and Matthew Macfadyen's explosive performances."

Pamela Paul of The New York Times called the episode "one of the best in the four-season series", and felt its examination of Shiv and Tom's marriage brought forth a "depth and poignancy often pointedly absent from the show’s usual orchestrations of insult." William Hughes of The A.V. Club gave the episode an A, describing it as "a seething cauldron of tension". He called Snook and Macfadyen's final scene together a "gorgeous, ugly performance from the toxic pair who’ve become this show’s unlikely heart", and noted the "palpable dread" generated by the episode's several subplots, praising Alexander Skarsgård's "fun" performance amidst an otherwise "dark" and "unrelenting" hour. Scott Tobias of Vulture gave the episode of 5 out of 5 stars, writing that Snook and Macfadyen "deliver the bullet points of this collapsing marriage with full feeling" during the "extraordinary" argument scene between Shiv and Tom. Ben Travers of IndieWire praised Tracy's writing of the scene, which he called "searing and tense, fitfully funny yet heartbreaking from start to finish." He gave the episode overall an A. Liz Shannon Miller of Consequence wrote that the confrontation scene illustrated "the difference between truth and honesty," calling it "a master class in emotional devastation" and applauding Snook and Macfadyen for embodying "a raw power that comes from years of sublimated emotion".

While praising the "spectacularly played" Shiv-Tom confrontation, Alan Sepinwall of Rolling Stone found the episode's other subplots less compelling by comparison, writing that "it all feels very much in the shadow of what’s happening with the party’s two hosts." Anita Singh of The Daily Telegraph gave the episode 4 out of 5 stars, singling out Macfadyen's "star turn" and Skarsgård's portrayal of the "spectacularly awful" Matsson for praise, but took issue with the episode's "testy and uncomfortable" tone, stating, "this wasn’t an episode to enjoy, exactly, however good the writing may have been." Nick Clark of the Evening Standard, meanwhile, found a "scattergun" quality to Shiv and Tom's progression from "the heights of rekindled romance (...) to a blazing row" within the span of a single episode. He suggested that the series was "in a holding pattern" since the season's midpoint, "seeding storylines, foreshadowing big events, teasing emotional turmoil, but keeping its powder dry."

=== Accolades ===
For their work on the episode, Sarah Snook won the award for Outstanding Lead Actress in a Drama Series and Matthew Macfadyen won the award for Outstanding Supporting Actor in a Drama Series at the 75th Primetime Emmy Awards.
