= Living+ =

- Succession episode
- Episode no.: Season 4 Episode 6
- Directed by: Lorene Scafaria
- Written by: Georgia Pritchett; Will Arbery
- Cinematography by: Katelin Arizmendi
- Original air date: April 30, 2023
- Running time: 62 minutes

Guest appearances
- Annabeth Gish as Joy Palmer; Scott Nicholson as Colin Stiles; Juliana Canfield as Jess Jordan

Episode chronology
← Previous "Kill List"	Next → "Tailgate Party"
- Succession season 4

"Living+" is the sixth episode of the fourth season of the American satirical comedy-drama television series Succession, and the 35th episode overall. It was written by Georgia Pritchett and Will Arbery and directed by Lorene Scafaria, and originally aired on HBO on April 30, 2023.

Succession centers on the Roy family, the owners of global media and entertainment conglomerate Waystar RoyCo, and their fight for control of the company amidst uncertainty about the health of the family's patriarch Logan (Brian Cox), who has passed away by this point of the series. The episode sees the Roys preparing the launch of "Living+", Logan's unrealized initiative on Waystar's Investor Day, as the ambition of Kendall (Jeremy Strong) and the unresolved grief of Roman (Kieran Culkin) threaten to destabilize the company. The episode notably features Cox's first appearance since Logan's death three episodes prior in "Connor's Wedding", as Logan appears via videos he had recorded for the launch.

“Living+" received critical acclaim, with praise for the performances (especially from Strong, Sarah Snook and Matthew Macfadyen), direction, and satirical elements. The episode earned Primetime Emmy Award nominations for Outstanding Directing for a Drama Series for Scafaria (losing to "Connor's Wedding"), and Outstanding Supporting Actress in a Drama Series for J. Smith-Cameron's performance as Gerri Kellman; it also won the Writers Guild of America Award for Television: Episodic Drama.

== Plot ==
The Roys prepare for Waystar's Investor Day event in Los Angeles, where Kendall and Roman plan to launch "Living+", a luxury assisted living community Logan had proposed as a business venture prior to his death. Matsson dislikes the idea and, meeting Shiv en route to the event, tells her to convince her brothers to call it off. Shiv refuses; Matsson reveals that his negotiation with Kendall and Roman in Norway turned hostile. (Note: As seen in "Kill List")

In Los Angeles, Kendall and Roman falsely tell Waystar's senior executives that it is in fact Matsson who is apprehensive about the GoJo deal and behaved erratically; Gerri still promises that the deal is viable. After the others leave, Shiv confronts her brothers, who admit they dislike the deal and apologize for not telling her. Shiv later has an emotional moment to herself in an unused meeting room; Tom enters unexpectedly but comforts her, and the two share a kiss.

Roman visits Waystar Studios to meet with its division head, Joy Palmer, after the disastrous production of their latest big-budget film. (Note: As depicted in "Kill List.") Roman promises Joy the company's full financial support to accelerate the production of profitable content, but she expresses concerns about ATN's favorable coverage of Jeryd Mencken's campaign, which has subjected the studio to increased scrutiny. Roman accuses Joy of not taking him seriously as the company leader and impulsively fires her.

That night, Shiv and Tom begin to reconnect romantically; Tom admits he betrayed Shiv (Note: As depicted in "All the Bells Say".) to preserve his career prospects and status, confiding that he felt his loyalties caught between Shiv and her father. Gerri, meanwhile, takes Roman aside to chastise him for firing Joy without going through proper HR and legal channels, accusing him of being unfit to run the company. Roman angrily fires Gerri as well for disrespecting him; he immediately regrets his decision and seeks advice from Kendall, who is surprised but approves, newly energized over the product launch.

Kendall prepares an outlandish pitch for Living+ that includes wildly optimistic earnings projections, hoping to draw enough investment interest at the event to drive up Waystar's stock price and render the GoJo acquisition untenable. Shiv, concerned that Kendall is entering another manic spiral and facing increasing pressure from Matsson, asks Roman to talk Kendall out of making his speech. Roman, however, can only bring himself to back out of his own role in the presentation, leaving Kendall to deliver it himself. Before Kendall takes the stage, Karl warns him that he will go public with his objections if Kendall makes earnings promises that the company can't deliver.

Despite a shaky start, Kendall ultimately delivers a successful speech, incorporating video footage of Logan that Greg had edited to include a promise of doubling Waystar's parks revenue. Matsson attempts to sabotage the speech by mocking the product in a Tweet that alludes to the Holocaust, but Kendall allays the audience's concerns during a Q&A session, while Shiv privately convinces Matsson to delete the Tweet. Waystar's stock price ultimately increases due to positive press coverage of Kendall's presentation. Afterward, Shiv and Tom plan a pre-election party at their home; Roman repeatedly listens to an edited video of Logan mocking him that Kendall had sent him as a joke; Kendall enjoys a cathartic swim at the beach.

== Production ==
"Living+" was written by Georgia Pritchett and Will Arbery and directed by Lorene Scafaria. It is Pritchett's fifth writing credit for the series and Arbery's first, as well as Scafaria's third episode as a director, and her second for the season after "Honeymoon States".

=== Writing ===
The episode's namesake is a utopian assisted living community that Waystar wants to launch. Yasmeen Hamadeh of Mashable compared it to Disney's Golden Oak and Storyliving ventures, both upscale residential communities that offer exclusive benefits to their patrons — similar to Kendall's pitch for Living+ members to enjoy luxury homes, built-in security, and advance screenings of Waystar films attended by stars and filmmakers. Kendall also pitches "Living+ Support", a life extension idea that Hamadeh felt reminiscent of the series Black Mirror. Both Megan Garber of The Atlantic and Scott Tobias of Vulture compared the life-extension pitch to Theranos; Tobias also drew comparisons to the company WeWork as well as the Villages, Florida's age-restricted living community, while Garber compared it to Google's biotech subsidiary Calico, whose research is focused on combating aging. Whizy Kim of Vox found the company's branding similar to Apple while considering its business model a broad satire of tiered subscription services. Succession creator Jesse Armstrong confirmed that the idea to set the episode around a product launch was inspired by both Apple and Microsoft's keynote events.

=== Filming ===
The series filmed on location in the Los Angeles area for both the first and sixth episodes of the fourth season. For "Living+", the Warner Bros. Studios complex in Burbank stood in for Waystar's studio lot, which Roman visits; Warner Bros. is a subsidiary of Warner Bros. Discovery, the parent company of HBO.

On the other hand, Waystar's Investor Day, said to take place in Los Angeles, was actually filmed inside New York University's Skirball Center for the Performing Arts; Scafaria shot the sequence with seven cameras at once. Actor Jeremy Strong conceived of Kendall's flight suit worn during his investor presentation, hoping to emulate Elon Musk during his tumultuous takeover of Twitter, as well as Shari Redstone, who was featured in a ViacomCBS product launch video riding in a car modeled after the Transformers character Bumblebee. Strong worked with costume designer Michelle Matland to design the flight suit, which was inspired aesthetically by the film Top Gun: Maverick and conceptually by spacesuits designed for SpaceX by Hollywood costume designer José Fernandez. Scafaria and Strong felt the inclusion of an ATN logo on the jacket conjured "fascist imagery" reminiscent of Leni Riefenstahl. The final scene of the episode was filmed in Zuma Beach, Malibu in October 2022; Strong performed Kendall's swimming scenes without a stunt double.

Brian Cox reappears as Logan Roy in the episode, in a series of video snippets Logan had recorded to announce the product idea for Living+. Scafaria makes a voice cameo as the director for the videos, having been asked by Armstrong to play the role.

== Reception ==
=== Critical reception ===
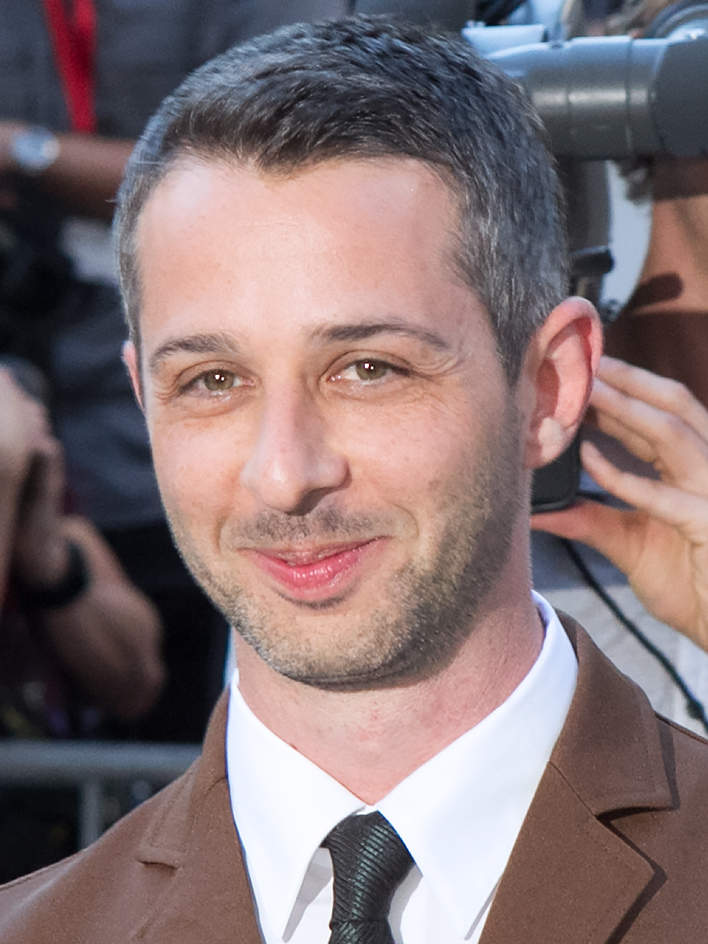
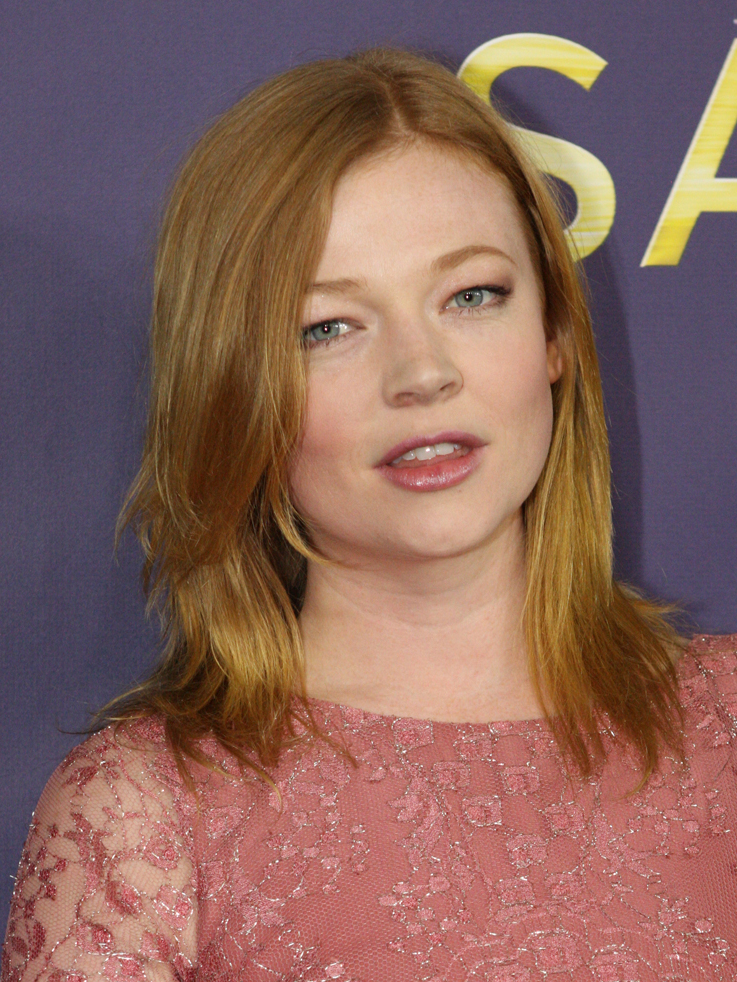
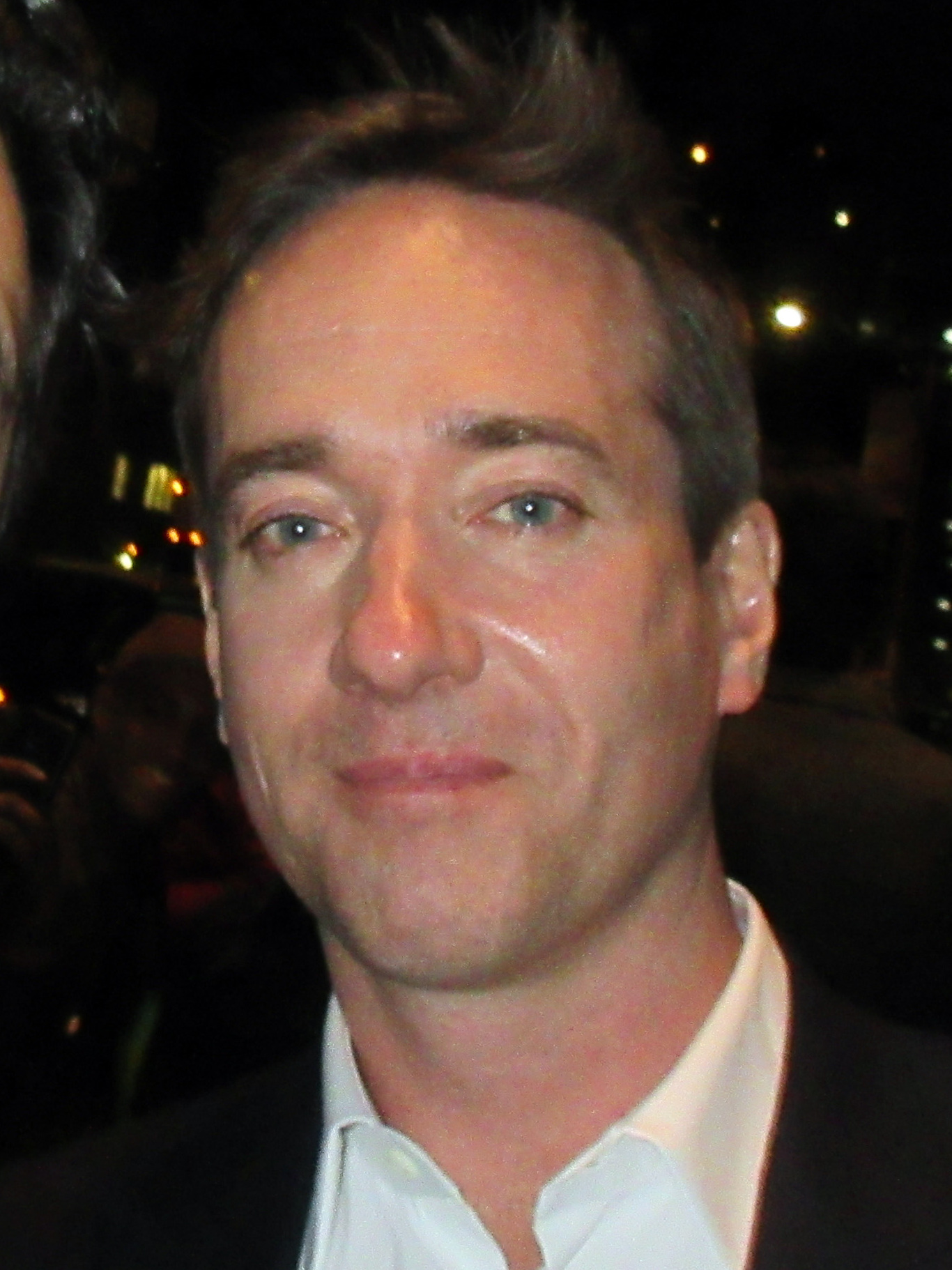
The performances of Jeremy Strong, Sarah Snook and Matthew Macfadyen were highly praised by critics.

"Living+" received critical acclaim, with reviewers praising the performances, Scafaria's direction, and the episode's satirical elements. On the review aggregator Rotten Tomatoes, it holds an approval rating of 94% based on 17 reviews. The website's critical consensus states, "The Roy boys struggle to fill big shoes -- big shoes! -- in "Living+," an acidic episode that may lack the juggernaut momentum of previous entries but goes far in underscoring the corruptive influence of absolute power."

William Hughes of The A.V. Club gave the episode an A−, praising Strong's "profound capacity to express pain and vulnerability that can be practically irresistible in the right arena", as well as Scafaria's directing for capturing the actor's "every twitch and little smile and un-shed tear". Hughes also praised the material involving Shiv and Tom, calling Sarah Snook's performance the episode's "most intriguing" and writing that Matthew Macfadyen "continues to reap incredible dividends by playing a quieter, sadder, and more honest version of Tom". Scott Tobias of Vulture gave the episode 5 out of 5 stars, calling it "an absolutely brilliant parody of the fanciful thinking that makes tech phenomena like Theranos possible." He praised Kendall's presentation as a "dramatic masterstroke", as well as the episode's examination of Shiv and Tom's "sad, sexy, vicious, transactional, and confusing" relationship.

Noel Murray of The New York Times noted Strong's "gift for playing those moments when Kendall's over-the-top enthusiasm suddenly craters", and praised both the actor and the script during Kendall's investor speech for effectively toeing the line between credibility and embarrassment. Erik Kain of Forbes praised Kieran Culkin and J. Smith-Cameron's "terrific" performances during Roman and Gerri's confrontation, and similarly called Snook and Macfadyen "riveting" in their scenes opposite one another. Ben Travers of IndieWire gave the episode an A−, writing that the episode "creates and sustains tension in ways both familiar and disruptive". He felt the episode's distinctive premise and location exemplified the series' ability to "implement an episodic structure within a serialized drama", and applauded Snook and Macfadyen for "capturing such delicate contradictions with piercing clarity" in the Shiv-Tom subplot.

Elizabeth Gregory of the Evening Standard was less positive, finding the episode "stagnant" and "dull" compared to the previous two, and deeming it "arguably unnecessary" to the season's overall storyline. She primarily criticized the episode for revisiting established character threads - such as Kendall and Roman's incompetence - and wrote that its thematic importance was "presently eluding us". The A.V. Club's Hughes, meanwhile, was unconvinced by the episode's depiction of Kendall's speech as a victory, but felt the scene worked nonetheless, due to Strong's performance.

=== Accolades ===
At the 75th Primetime Emmy Awards, J. Smith-Cameron submitted this episode to support her nomination for Outstanding Supporting Actress in a Drama Series.
