= Shiv Roy =

Fictional character from Succession

Siobhan Roy
- Succession character
- Sarah Snook as Shiv Roy
- First appearance: "Celebration" (2018)
- Last appearance: "With Open Eyes" (2023)
- Created by: Jesse Armstrong
- Portrayed by: Sarah Snook

In-universe information
- Full name: Siobhan Roy
- Nicknames: Shiv (by Logan); Shivvy (by Kendall)
- Title(s): President of Domestic Operations, Waystar RoyCo
- Occupation: Political consultant (season 1–2); Businesswoman (season 2-4)
- Affiliation: Waystar RoyCo
- Family: Logan Roy (father); Caroline Collingwood (mother); Connor Roy (half-brother); Kendall Roy (brother); Roman Roy (brother)
- Spouses: Tom Wambsgans (m. 2018)
- Significant other: Nate Sofrelli (ex-boyfriend)
- Relatives: Ewan Roy (paternal uncle); Marianne Hirsch (paternal cousin); Greg Hirsch (paternal first cousin, once removed); Willa Ferreyra (sister-in-law)
- Home: New York City, United States
- Nationality: British-American

Siobhan "Shiv" Roy is a fictional character in the American HBO satirical dark comedy-drama television series Succession. She is portrayed by Sarah Snook.

She is a member of the Roy family, owners of the global media and entertainment conglomerate Waystar Royco, led by her father Logan Roy. Shiv is Logan's youngest child and only daughter from his second marriage. As a left-leaning political fixer upon Logan's retirement, Shiv distanced herself from the company until she was offered a leadership position by her father. The various back-and-forths with her family for control of the company, as well as her strained marriage to Tom Wambsgans, become a central part of Shiv's storyline.

== Development ==
=== Casting and creation ===
Shiv Roy and her siblings were inspired by the offspring of real-life business magnates, such as Ian and Kevin Maxwell, Shari and Brent Redstone, and Rupert Murdoch's children. Jesse Armstrong, the creator of Succession, wanted the Roy children to have lived in England for a while, as a way to show that they were "quite international due to being incredibly wealthy." Sarah Snook originally did not want to audition for Shiv because there was nothing in herself that she found "reflective or accessible" in a "beautiful and wealthy" character. She recorded a tape anyway and was ultimately called in for a screen test. The Succession creative team flew Snook from her native Australia to Los Angeles for her final audition, which she completed with Jeremy Strong, who played her older brother and heir apparent Kendall Roy. Before the audition, she spoke to Armstrong and executive producer Adam McKay on the phone and learned more about their interests in comedy, politics, and family dynamics.

When she was offered the part by Armstrong, Snook turned it down due to concerns with how the series would manage themes of sexism, particularly in the workplace. "If the world is going to be interested in a bunch of white dudes talking about business, and if I’m the only woman in that, then I’m likely to get sidelined and be like some sort of prop," Snook explained to Variety. "I don’t feel like that personally, nor do I feel like I want to compete for that." She gave the role a second chance by re-examining the part through the perspective of Succession's creative team. She had blind faith that the role would open an opportunity for her to fight for female characters, rather than being sidelined as one of the only women attached to the pilot episode. "There’s a focus lens toward that kind of sexism," said Snook. "It is present in the show because it’s present in real life, it’s there, and that’s inherent in the characters’ behavior, as well as the things they say."

== Background ==
Siobhan Roy was born in England as the youngest child and only daughter of Scottish media-mogul Logan Roy and of his second wife, the English aristocrat Caroline Collingwood. She has two older brothers, Kendall and Roman, and an older half-brother, Connor (from Logan's first marriage). Gerri Kellman, the general counsel to Waystar RoyCo, is Shiv's godmother. Shiv relocated to New York City with her father and siblings after her parents' divorce.

One interpretation implies that Logan treated Shiv preferentially; he affectionately calls her "Pinky", but he focused his efforts solely on her older brothers in grooming potential successors. Logan's supposed preference for Shiv caused her to have an acrimonious relationship with her mother, who resented the time they did not get to spend together following the divorce. Disillusioned with her family's right-wing conglomerate, Shiv opted to wield her "natural leadership instincts" in liberal politics by working as a political fixer. She was romantically involved with Nate Sofrelli, a fellow political-fixer who spent time with Kendall in Shanghai, China after he graduated from college.

During a turbulent period in her life (presumably after she experienced a painful breakup with a previous partner), Shiv met Tom Wambsgans, a businessman from Saint Paul, Minnesota. The two enjoyed a courtship in France and eventually fell in love, although their relationship is deeply flawed.

=== Personality ===
Throughout, the series shows Shiv as shrewd, competent, and more resistant than her siblings to their father's wishes. She has an "indomitable" presence with a "persistent" sense of determination, but she is also emotionally troubled.

== Character arc ==
=== Season 1 ===
Shiv begins the first season of Succession as a political consultant largely distanced from Waystar RoyCo's affairs. During Logan's eightieth birthday celebration, the siblings are shocked when he asks them to sign documents that would give his third wife, Marcia, two seats on the company's board. Kendall offers Shiv and Roman a counterproposal that would name him as Logan's successor and appoint the two of them as co-chief operating officers; the duo immediately rebuff Kendall. Logan suddenly suffers a hemorrhagic stroke and is rushed to the hospital during an argument with his children regarding Marcia's involvement with the trust.

In the wake of Logan's incapacitation, the Roy children disagree over who should take control of the company. Roman insists that Shiv signs the trust documents alongside him, but she doubts Marcia's role in the company. He then blames Shiv for causing Logan's stroke with her hardball tactics, provoking a physical altercation. Tom spontaneously proposes to Shiv in the hospital; she accepts but wishes that he asked her under better circumstances. Ultimately Shiv and Roman both back Kendall as acting chief executive officer (CEO) during Logan's incapacitation. She grows suspicious of Marcia and asks Nate to run a background check on her. Marcia reassures her that she is willing to answer any questions she may have.

Roman informs Shiv that nude photographs of the husband of her political candidate, Joyce Miller, have leaked online. She unsuccessfully tries to block ATN, Waystar's global news outlet, from airing the story. Shiv then has a dispute with Tom and his mother-attorney regarding their prenuptial agreement, which does not contain any conditions related to infidelity. Tom wonders if its absence meant that Shiv would be unfaithful to him, but she dodges his concerns. Shiv then has dinner with Nate, who presents an opportunity for the two of them to work for the presidential campaign of Logan's political nemesis. She spends the night with him in his apartment, albeit in separate rooms. Although they are both engaged to other partners, they remain sexually attracted to each other.

Shiv attends a weekend-long family therapy session at Connor's ranch in New Mexico, but she prematurely exits to speak with U.S. Senator and leftist presidential candidate Gil Eavis. Logan chastises her for meeting with his rival and calls her a coward for marrying Tom. Marcia later informs Shiv that Logan will not attend her and Tom's wedding. However, Logan and Marcia appear at the wedding anyway to avoid bad publicity. After meeting with Nate, Tom confronts Shiv of her infidelity, which she denies. She then gathers political ammunition for Gil and leverages it to force a truce between him and Logan. Kendall makes a failed attempt to take over Waystar during the wedding. After they were declared husband and wife, Shiv finally admits her infidelity to Tom and asks for an open marriage. He forgives her and ejects Nate from the wedding.

=== Season 2 ===
Shiv and Tom decide to cut their honeymoon short to attend to family matters in the wake of Kendall's attempted takeover. They join Logan and the other Roy children at the family's summer home in the Hamptons for lunch. Logan asks his children for their opinion on whether he should sell Waystar. None of them is comfortable openly sharing their thoughts, so Logan meets each individually in the privacy of his office. During their meeting, Logan offers Shiv the role of CEO. She accepts but chooses to not disclose the news to Tom; she simply informs him that he was promoted to ATN's chair of global broadcast news.

Gil tells Shiv that if he were to be elected president, he would name her his chief of staff. On the other land, Logan suggests it would take three years for Shiv to fully integrate into her offered role at Waystar. She finally tells Tom the news; he is excited for her but worries about his plans to inherit the company. Shiv reassures him that his ambitions are not in jeopardy before she mocks him and tells Roman in secrecy to not consider him as a threat. After considering her two options, Shiv quits Gil's campaign and informs Logan that she is ready to work for Waystar.

Shiv vehemently opposes Logan's plans to take over Waystar's rival Pierce Global Media (PGM). She asks Tom to talk him out of it before he leaves for the Waystar hunting retreat in Hungary; while he is away, she enjoys a one-night stand. Logan later tells Shiv that it is time to bring her into the company. On her first day, she observes the daily operations of Waystar as everyone is rushed into panic rooms. She is concerned about Kendall's mental health; he tearfully confides to her his belief that the only valuable aspect of him is his loyalty to Logan. During a weekend trip to the Pierce family estate in Long Island, Shiv abruptly announces that she was chosen to serve as CEO. Nan Pierce, the head of PGM, agrees to sell the company to the Roys on the condition that Shiv would be named as Logan's successor on the day of the merger. Logan refuses and calls off the deal, but receives a call soon after saying the Pierces changed their mind. Nan ultimately calls off the acquisition after New York Magazine published a sexual misconduct exposé regarding Waystar's cruise line. During a panel discussion, Shiv suggests that Logan should step down from the company.

As Tom worries about his future with Waystar, Rhea Jarrell offers Shiv her former position as CEO of PGM. Shiv is interested in the offer, despite her growing suspicions that their meeting was a ploy concocted by her father. Logan later confirms Shiv's suspicions and accuses her of conspiring against him.

=== Season 3 ===
After Kendall delivers a surprise statement naming Logan responsible for overseeing the cover-up of the crimes, Logan decides to step back temporarily as CEO. He names Shiv President of Domestic Operations at Waystar, which she quickly comes to learn is a figurehead title that is earning her little respect from within the company. However, Shiv manages successfully to negotiate the terms of a settlement with Stewy and Sandi at Waystar's shareholder meeting, thereby preserving the Roys' majority ownership in the company. Shiv and Logan remain at odds after she protests against Waystar's backing of controversial far-right Congressman Jeryd Mencken for the presidency.

Shiv's relationship with Tom continues to be strained during this period: she becomes irritated with his paranoia about going to prison for the scandal, and is ambivalent about his desire to have a child with her. However, she changes her mind about the latter after a bitter conversation with her mother at the latter's wedding in Italy, where Caroline says she regrets having children. The siblings learn at the wedding that Logan plans to sell Waystar to tech giant GoJo, effectively leaving them without an inheritance, and they resolve to halt the sale by invoking a clause in Logan's divorce agreement which grants the children power of veto over any change in company control. Shiv informs Tom of her plans, but he realizes she has not considered what his status will be within the siblings' alliance. The siblings discover Logan has already renegotiated the divorce agreement by the time they arrive to confront him, and Shiv discovers it was Tom who betrayed her by tipping off Logan about his children's revolt.

=== Season 4 ===
Six months later, Shiv and Tom are on a trial separation and seeking a divorce. Shiv is secretly 20 weeks pregnant, which she hides from her family. Shiv and her siblings are estranged from Logan and planning an independent media venture they call "The Hundred". However, on Logan's birthday they learn their father is attempting to buy PGM again; they successfully outbid him. They then partner with Stewy and Sandi - who want to negotiate a price increase for the GoJo sale - spitefully seeking to pressure Logan into renegotiating the deal with GoJo founder Lukas Matsson. However, Logan dies en route to his meeting with Matsson in Sweden; the siblings learn of his death while at Connor's wedding, and Shiv reads a statement to the press announcing their father's death.

At Logan's wake, the family discovers a document in Logan's safe naming Kendall his successor; he and Roman opt to run the company together as co-CEOs, leaving Shiv uncertain about her position. Shiv attempts to curry favor with Matsson amidst her brothers' attempts to sabotage the GoJo deal, but regrets it once she discovers Matsson has inflated GoJo's subscriber numbers, putting the company's future in jeopardy. She and Tom get into a vicious argument about their marriage during a party which they are hosting on the night before the presidential election, where Tom tells her he regrets marrying her and that she is unfit to be a mother.

Shiv attempts to apologize to Tom the following day during the election, but Tom is unreceptive; she finally tells him she is pregnant with his child, but is hurt when Tom reacts skeptically, believing it to be a manipulation tactic. During the election, Shiv hopes for Democratic candidate Daniel Jiménez to win the presidency, knowing he will allow the GoJo deal to go through, and being deeply concerned about the threat that Mencken's fascist agenda poses to American democracy. Kendall turns on her after learning she is working with Matsson, and she is powerless to stop her brothers from okaying ATN to call the election in Mencken's favor.

The next day she tells Kendall and Roman about her pregnancy in the car on the way to their father's funeral. At the church, the kids reunite with Caroline, who immediately notices that Shiv is pregnant. Both Matsson and Mencken arrive; Shiv meets with Matsson to propose making a deal with Mencken to allow the GoJo sale through in exchange for Matsson's naming an American as Waystar's CEO. Shiv nominates herself, but Matsson is lukewarm, questioning her inexperience and ability to perform effectively while pregnant and thereafter as a new mother. When Roman fails to give his eulogy, his siblings comfort him and give the eulogy in his place. Shiv speaks last, describing the precious rarity of receiving love from her cold father as well as the struggles of being the daughter of a man who did not understand women.

At the funeral reception, Shiv speaks with Mencken and brings him to meet Matsson, where the two pitch for the sale to go through. Mencken remains non-committal until state their proposal to install an American CEO after the GoJo-Waystar acquisition. Tom finally arrives at the reception and shares a moment with Shiv and Caroline. Matsson calls Shiv to report that Mencken has accepted the terms of their deal; Shiv is elated, believing her position as CEO of Waystar is secured. Unbeknownst to her, however, Mattson has begun to look around for other potential CEOs, ultimately settling on Tom. Shiv initially works with her siblings to make Kendall CEO and block the acquisition. But, having the deciding vote, she has a change of heart and ultimately votes to allow the acquisition to proceed and for Tom to become CEO of Waystar. Shiv is last seen leaving the meeting with Tom, the two tentatively holding hands as their car pulls away.

== Reception ==
For her portrayal of Shiv, Sarah Snook won the Primetime Emmy Award for Outstanding Lead Actress in a Drama Series at the 75th Primetime Emmy Awards.
