= List of Succession characters =

The following is a list of characters who appear in Succession, an American satirical comedy-drama television series created by Jesse Armstrong centering on a super-rich and dysfunctional family who own a global media conglomerate.

== Cast timeline ==
Key
Main cast (receives star billing)
Recurring cast (credited as guest starring in two or more episodes)
Guest cast (credited as guest starring in one episode)
Co-starring cast (credited as co-starring in one or more episodes)

Actor	Character	Seasons			
Actor	Character	1	2	3	4
Main characters
Hiam Abbass	Marcia Roy	Main	Main	Recurring (Note: Credited as guest starring in the opening titles, unlike other guest stars.)	Main (Note: Credited only in the episodes in which they appear.)
Nicholas Braun	Greg Hirsch	Main	Main	Main	Main
Brian Cox	Logan Roy	Main	Main	Main	Main
Kieran Culkin	Roman Roy	Main	Main	Main	Main
Peter Friedman	Frank Vernon	Main	Main	Main	Main
Natalie Gold	Rava Roy	Main		Recurring	Recurring
Matthew Macfadyen	Tom Wambsgans	Main	Main	Main	Main
Alan Ruck	Connor Roy	Main	Main	Main	Main
Parker Sawyers	Alessandro Daniels	Main (Note: Pilot only.)			
Sarah Snook	Siobhan "Shiv" Roy	Main	Main	Main	Main
Jeremy Strong	Kendall Roy	Main	Main	Main	Main
Rob Yang	Lawrence Yee	Main	Main		
Dagmara Domińczyk	Karolina Novotney	Recurring	Main	Main	Main
Arian Moayed	Stewy Hosseini	Recurring	Main	Recurring	Main
J. Smith-Cameron	Gerri Kellman	Recurring	Main	Main	Main
Justine Lupe	Willa Ferreyra	Recurring	Recurring	Main	Main
David Rasche	Karl Muller	Recurring	Recurring	Main	Main
Fisher Stevens	Hugo Baker		Recurring	Main	Main
Alexander Skarsgård	Lukas Matsson			Recurring	Main
Recurring characters
Mary Birdsong	Marianne Hirsch	Recurring			Co-starring
Molly Griggs	Grace	Recurring			
Judy Reyes	Eva	Recurring			
Larry Pine	Sandy Furness	Recurring	Recurring	Recurring	Recurring
Ashley Zukerman	Nate Sofrelli	Recurring	Recurring	Guest	Recurring
James Cromwell	Ewan Roy	Recurring	Guest	Recurring	Recurring
Eric Bogosian	Gil Eavis	Recurring	Recurring		
Harriet Walter	Lady Caroline Collingwood	Recurring	Guest	Recurring	Recurring
Caitlin FitzGerald	Tabitha Hayes (Note: FitzGerald appeared in the promotional trailer for season 4 but ultimately made no appearance in the season.)	Recurring	Recurring		
Danny Huston	Jamie Laird		Recurring		
Scott Nicholson	Colin Stiles	Co-starring	Recurring	Recurring	Recurring
Jeannie Berlin	Cyd Peach		Recurring	Guest	Recurring
Patch Darragh	Ray		Recurring	Recurring	Recurring
Holly Hunter	Rhea Jarrell		Recurring		
Zack Robidas	Mark Ravenhead	Co-starring	Guest	Recurring	Recurring
Cherry Jones	Nan Pierce		Recurring		Guest
Annabelle Dexter-Jones	Naomi Pierce		Recurring	Recurring	Guest
Mark Linn-Baker	Maxim Pierce		Guest	Guest	Recurring
Babak Tafti	Eduard Asgarov		Recurring		
Sanaa Lathan	Lisa Arthur			Recurring	
Linda Emond	Michelle-Anne Vanderhoven			Recurring	
Juliana Canfield	Jess Jordan	Co-starring	Co-starring	Recurring	Recurring
Jihae	Berry Schneider			Recurring	
Dasha Nekrasova	Comfry Pellits			Recurring	
Jordan Lage	Keith Zigler			Recurring	
Hope Davis	Sandi Furness			Recurring	Recurring
KeiLyn Durrel Jones	Remi			Recurring	Guest
Zoë Winters	Kerry Castellabate		Co-starring	Recurring	Recurring
Quentin Morales	Iverson Roy	Co-starring	Co-starring	Recurring	Guest
Swayam Bhatia	Sophie Roy	Co-starring	Co-starring	Recurring	Recurring
Justin Kirk	Jeryd Mencken			Guest	Recurring
Pip Torrens	Peter Munion			Recurring	Recurring
Kevin Changaris	Tellis				Recurring
Cynthia Mace	Sylvia Ferreyra				Recurring
Elliot Villar	Daniel Jiménez				Recurring
Jóhannes Haukur Jóhannesson	Oskar Guðjohnsen				Recurring
Brian Hotaling	Mark Rosenstock		Co-starring	Co-starring	Recurring
Eili Harboe	Ebba				Recurring

== Roy family members ==
Roy family tree

Helen Elspeth Roy †	Uncle Noah †
Ewan Roy	Rose Roy †
Logan Roy †	First Wife
Marianne Roy Hirsch	Connor Roy	Willa Ferreyra
Gregory Hirsch	Lady Caroline Collingwood (Second Wife)
Tom Wambsgans	Siobhan Roy	Roman Roy	Kendall Roy	Rava Roy
Sophie Roy	Iverson Roy
Marcia Roy (Third Wife)	First Husband
Amir

=== Logan Roy ===
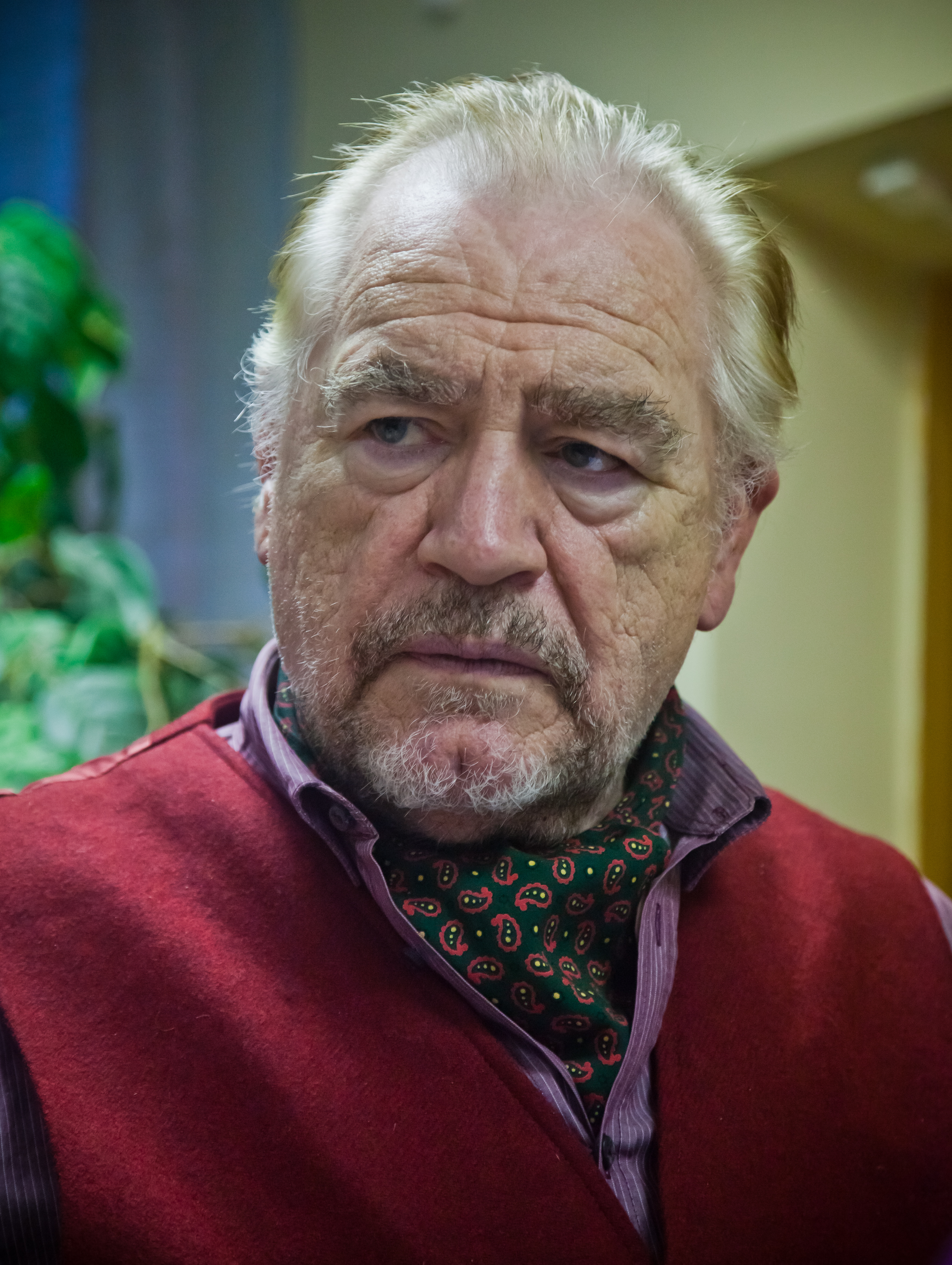
Brian Cox

Logan Roy (played by Brian Cox) is the billionaire founder of media and entertainment conglomerate Waystar RoyCo. He is a brash leader whose primary focus was his company rather than his four children Connor, Kendall, Roman and Siobhan.

Logan was born in 1938, to abject poverty in Dundee, Scotland. His mother Helen died when he was four years old, and he and his elder brother Ewan fled Dundee shortly afterwards during World War II in a convoy traveling to Canada. The two were then raised in Quebec by their aunt and uncle, who sent Logan to boarding school, during which Logan and Ewan's infant sister Rose was brought to Canada. Logan detested boarding school and eventually returned home; Rose died of polio shortly afterwards, which Logan's aunt and uncle blamed on him - Logan continued to carry the guilt into his adulthood. Logan's uncle Noah subjected him to vicious physical abuse throughout his childhood. In his adulthood, Logan used money bequeathed to him by his father to buy an advertising business, which formed the seed for the family holding company he started with Ewan. He then bought out Ewan's shares in the company and purchased the Waystar newspaper in 1967, going on to grow his company into a global media and entertainment empire under the name Waystar RoyCo. His leadership of the company estranged him from Ewan, who despises his politics.

Logan has a son, Connor, with his first wife (who was committed to a psychiatric institution), and three children (Kendall, Roman, and Siobhan) with his second wife, Caroline. While married to Caroline, he had a passionate affair with a woman named Sally-Anne; eventually, he divorced Caroline and went on to meet his third wife, Marcia. Logan is shown to have been emotionally withdrawn and abusive to his children to varying degrees throughout their upbringing, leading all of them to continue clamoring for his approval as adults. As a business leader, Logan is shown to be extraordinarily shrewd, ruthless and well-connected; he holds significant influence over the sitting President of the United States (known within the family as "The Raisin"), who won election in large part due to support from Waystar's right-leaning news network, ATN.

Across the series, Logan serves as the domineering patriarch and long-serving CEO of Waystar, repeatedly manipulating succession plans to retain control. At the outset, he shocks his family by refusing to step aside on his 80th birthday before suffering a stroke, after which he recovers and aggressively reasserts authority, thwarting Kendall's attempted vote of no confidence and later neutralizing a hostile takeover by Stewy Hosseini and Sandy Furness through coercion and leverage, including covering up Kendall's role in a fatal car accident. As pressures mount from declining legacy media, shareholder unrest, and the exposure of systemic sexual abuse within Waystar's cruise division, Logan resists relinquishing power, instead attempting to acquire Pierce Global Media, and ultimately has Kendall take the fall for the cruises scandal, only for Kendall to publicly implicate Logan at a press conference. Logan weathers the scandal through legal settlements, and later accepts a sale of Waystar to streaming giant GoJo without his children's consent, stripping them of their voting power with the help of Caroline. Estranged from his children and preparing to finalize the deal, Logan dies suddenly of a pulmonary embolism while flying to renegotiate terms in Sweden. After his death, an ambiguous succession document naming Kendall is discovered. Logan appears posthumously through recorded messages.

=== Connor Roy ===
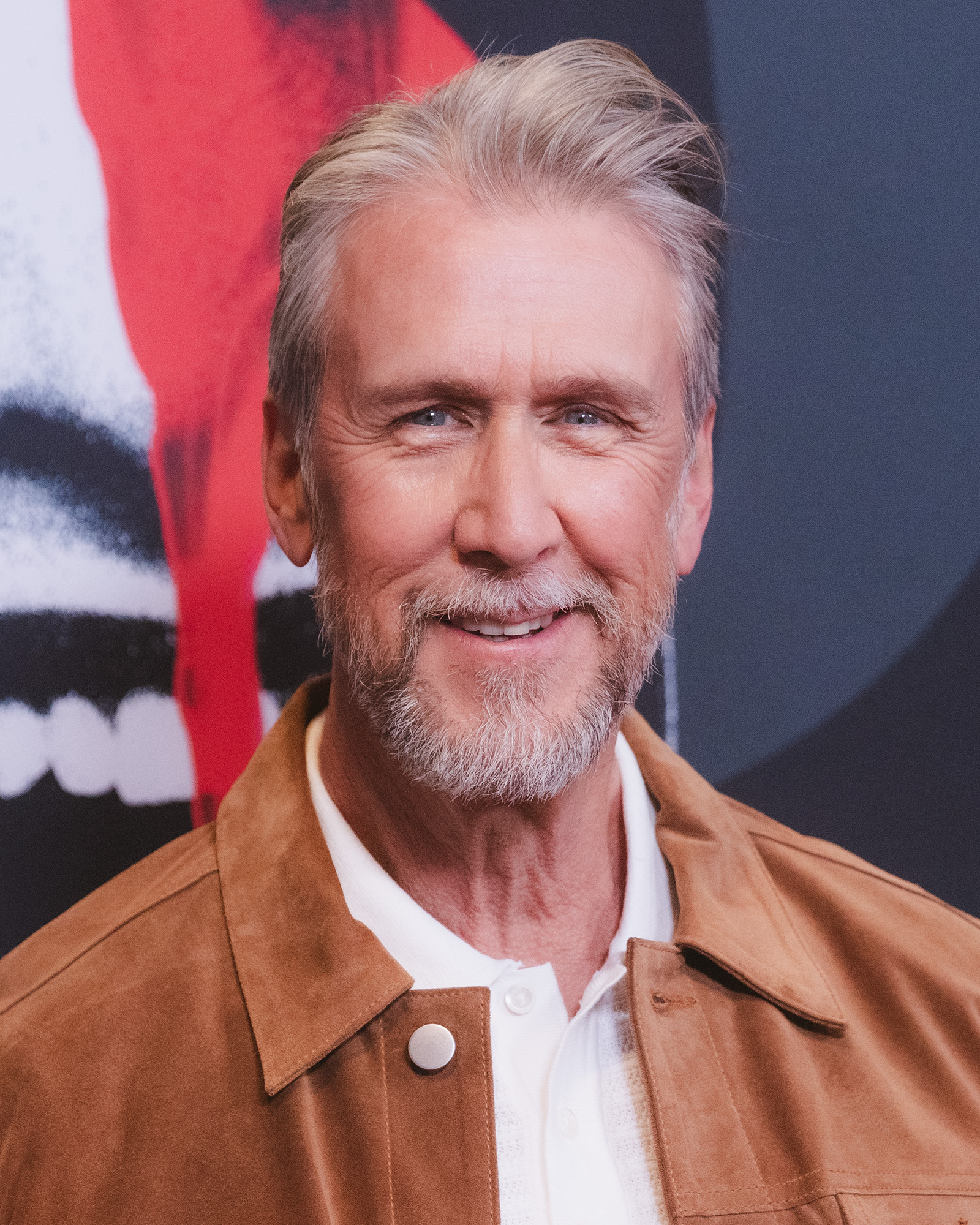
Alan Ruck

Connor Roy (played by Alan Ruck) is the eldest son of Logan's first marriage. Prone to delusions of grandeur, Connor is mostly removed from corporate affairs, residing at a ranch in New Mexico with his young girlfriend Willa, a former call girl, and deferring to his siblings on most firm-related matters. In season 2, he announces his bid for President of the United States, running as an independent candidate.

In the first season, Connor divides his time between New York and Austerlitz following Logan's stroke. He lives with Willa, whom he financially supports while she pursues a career as a playwright. After Kendall's failed vote of no confidence against Logan, the family gathers at Austerlitz for a staged therapy retreat that quickly collapses. Connor later persuades Willa to move to the ranch full-time. During Shiv's wedding, Connor announces his intention to run for President of the United States as a libertarian candidate.

In the second season, Connor relocates to New York with Willa, establishing a base for his presidential campaign while Willa produces her play. His anti-tax platform alarms the family, who fear it could interfere with Waystar's political relationships. Shiv attempts unsuccessfully to dissuade him from running. After Willa's play fails critically and commercially, Connor faces severe financial losses and asks Logan for a $100 million loan; Logan agrees on the condition that Connor suspend his campaign.

In the third season, Connor reacts to Kendall's public denunciation of Logan by acknowledging the family's complicity in the cruises scandal, though he remains aligned with Logan. He postpones his presidential ambitions and seeks a role at Waystar to bolster his credibility. When the sitting president declines to run for reelection, Connor briefly attempts to revive his campaign but fails to secure donor or family support. At Caroline's wedding in Tuscany, Connor proposes to Willa, who accepts after recognizing his vulnerability following Logan's decision to sell Waystar to GoJo.

In the fourth season, Connor and Willa marry aboard a yacht in New York on the same day Logan dies en route to Sweden. After receiving the news from Tom, Connor proceeds with a small ceremony and later purchases Logan's apartment from Marcia, taking responsibility for organizing the funeral. As the election concludes, Connor concedes the race to Jeryd Mencken in exchange for a promised ambassadorship to Slovenia.

=== Kendall Roy ===
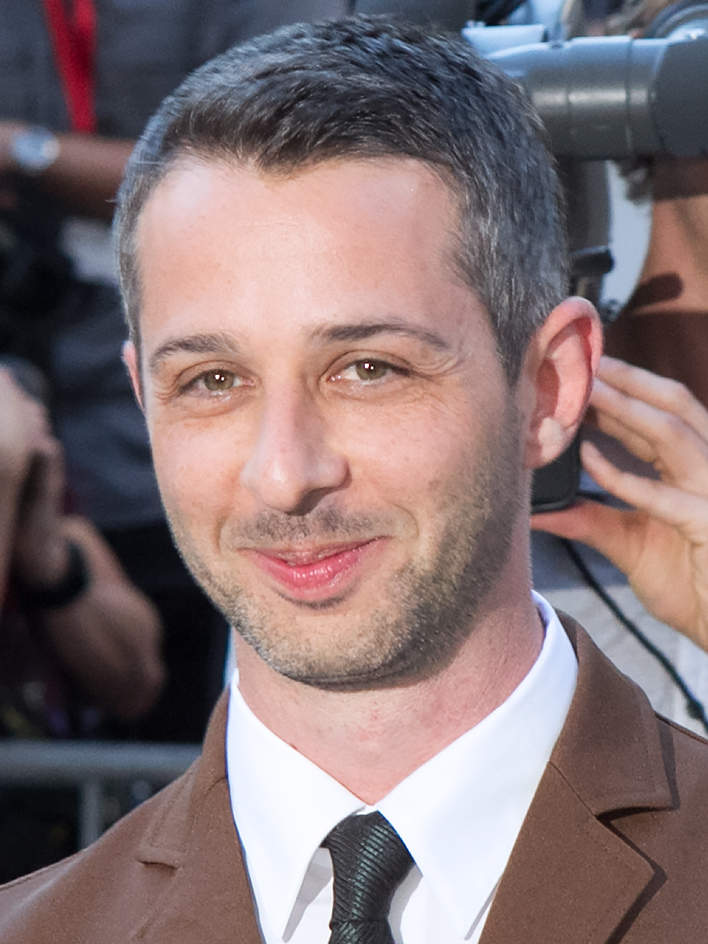
Jeremy Strong

Kendall Logan Roy (played by Jeremy Strong) is the second son of Logan from his second marriage. The presumed successor to Logan, Kendall struggles to prove his worth to his father amid bungling major deals and battling with substance abuse, as well as toiling to maintain a relationship with his estranged wife Rava, his siblings, and his children.

Kendall studied at the Buckley School, then both Harvard and Columbia University, which he attended alongside his best friend Stewy Hosseini. He also spent time in Shanghai learning the fundamentals of the family business. With his wife, Rava, he has a daughter, Sophie, and a son, Iverson. Kendall's substance-abuse issues eventually led to the breakdown of his marriage, and he went on to spend months in rehab before the start of the series. Throughout the series, Kendall is shown to be well-versed in business principles but emotionally insecure and lacking in authenticity and people-skills. He is an avid lover of hip hop and a strong believer in the technology industry and new media.

Kendall begins the series as the presumed successor to his father but is immediately destabilized when Logan announces he will remain CEO. Kendall negotiates Waystar's acquisition of online news startup Vaulter and, after Logan's stroke, serves as acting CEO while secretly relying on financing from Stewy, who is secretly aligned with Sandy Furness. When Logan returns and fires him following a failed vote of no confidence, Kendall relapses and conspires with Stewy and Sandy on a hostile takeover, which collapses after an intoxicated Kendall gets involved in a car accident at Shiv's wedding that kills a waiter; Logan covers up the incident to force Kendall's withdrawal from the takeover. Traumatized, Kendall becomes loyal to Logan, helping dismantle Vaulter and facilitating Logan's attempted acquisition of left-leaning news conglomerate Pierce Global Media (PGM). Amid a scandal involving historic sexual abuse on Waystar's cruise line, Logan has Kendall take the blame for the cover-up to appease shareholders, only for Kendall to reverse course at a press conference and publicly implicate Logan. His ensuing campaign against the company falters amid legal settlements and his own erratic behavior. After being rebuffed from a buyout by Logan, Kendall attempts suicide while at his mother's wedding in Italy, later confessing his role in the accident to his siblings. When Logan secretly sells Waystar to GoJo, Kendall joins Shiv and Roman in a failed attempt to veto the deal. Following Logan's death, an ambiguous document naming Kendall as successor leads him to serve as co-CEO with Roman and attempt to block GoJo's acquisition under Lukas Matsson, including delivering a high-profile investor presentation and attempting regulatory maneuvers. Despite briefly uniting with his siblings to install himself as CEO, Kendall loses the deciding board vote when Shiv defects, enabling the sale and Tom Wambsgans's appointment as CEO, leaving Kendall without a purpose.

=== Roman Roy ===
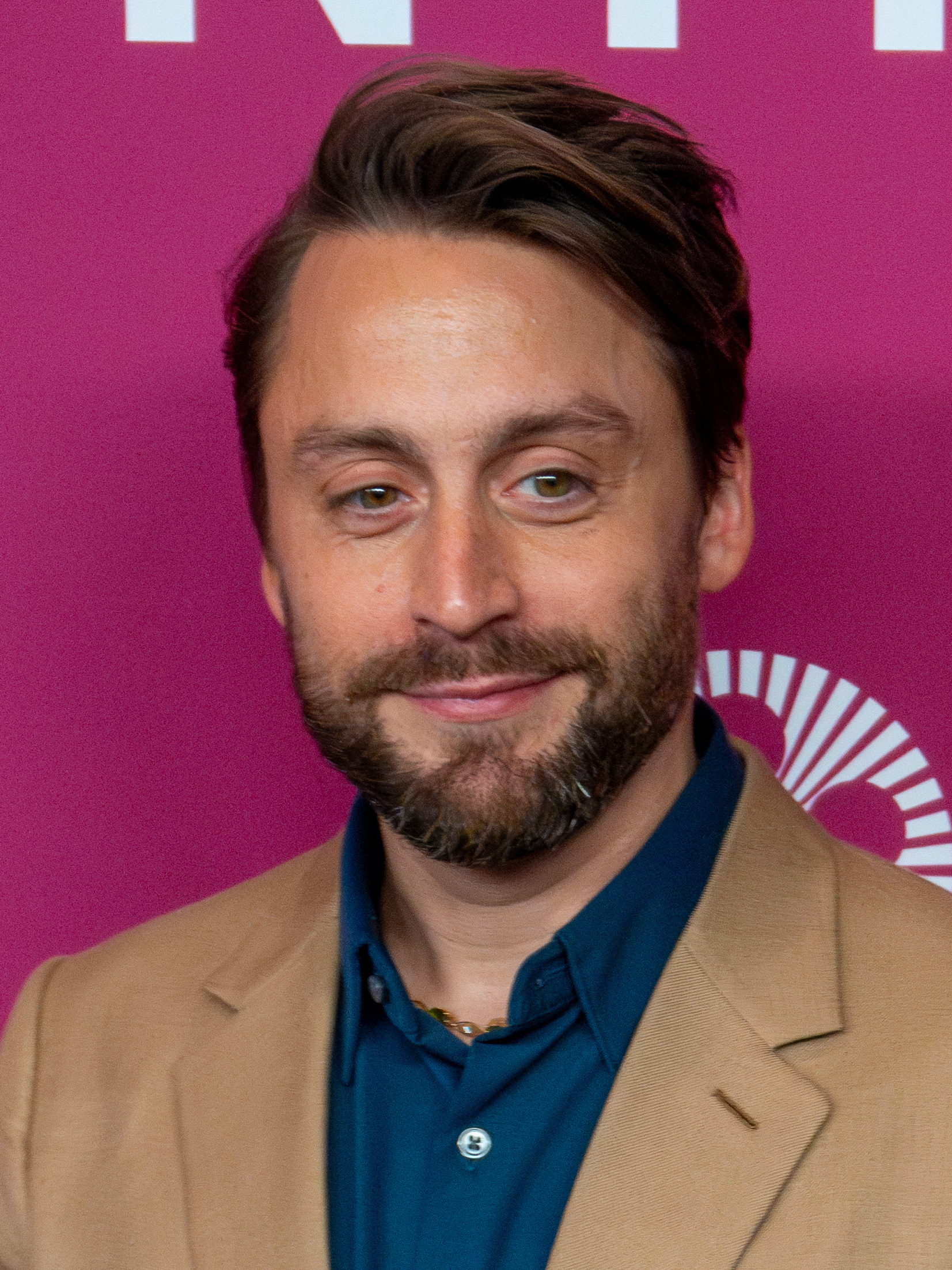
Kieran Culkin

Roman Roy (played by Kieran Culkin) is Logan's third and youngest son. Roman frequently seeks Logan's approval, which contributes to strained relationships with his siblings Kendall and Shiv and affects his standing within Waystar. Although shown to possess sharp instincts and occasional business acumen, Roman often undermines himself through his immaturity and avoidance of responsibility. As a child, he was physically abused by Logan and often humiliated by his siblings, experiences that recur in his adult behavior and personal relationships. Prior to the series, Roman performed poorly while running Waystar's film studio in Los Angeles, with Frank assigned to oversee him.

After Logan suffers a stroke during his 80th birthday, Roman is appointed COO under Kendall's interim tenure as CEO. He largely neglects his responsibilities, and his girlfriend Grace ends their relationship. When Kendall attempts a vote of no confidence against Logan, Roman initially agrees to support it but withdraws after Logan confronts him, contributing to the vote's failure. Logan fires Kendall, retains Roman as COO, and assigns him oversight of a satellite launch. Roman pressures the team to proceed despite safety concerns so the launch can coincide with Shiv's wedding; the rocket explodes on the launchpad, injuring several workers but killing no one.

Following a hostile takeover bid by Stewy Hosseini and Sandy Furness, Roman and Kendall are named co-COOs. Roman resents the arrangement and, at Gerri Kellman's suggestion, enrolls in Waystar's management training program. He develops a close professional relationship with Gerri and increasingly defers to her judgment, and the two develop an unexpected sexual dynamic involving verbal humiliation. During the cruises scandal, Roman attempts to secure funding from Azerbaijani aristocrat Eduard Asgarov. While negotiating in Turkey, Roman, Karl and Laird are briefly held hostage by anti-corruption militia. After returning, Roman advises Logan that the proposed investment is likely illegitimate.

After Kendall publicly accuses Logan of overseeing the cruises cover-up, Logan temporarily steps back and Gerri is appointed acting CEO, a decision Roman supports. Roman remains loyal to Logan despite Kendall's overtures and gains favor by backing far-right presidential candidate Jeryd Mencken and helping initiate talks with GoJo CEO Lukas Matsson. He later damages his standing by accidentally sending Logan an explicit photo meant for Gerri, who distances herself from him, and loses influence as Matsson proposes a full acquisition of Waystar. Roman joins Kendall and Shiv in attempting to block the sale, but Logan neutralizes them by renegotiating his divorce settlement to strip their voting rights.

Six months later, the siblings are estranged from Logan, and pursue an independent media venture, which they abandon after outbidding Logan for Pierce Global Media. Roman and his siblings plan to use the Pierce acquisition to force a higher GoJo offer, but Logan dies en route to meeting Matsson in Sweden. A draft succession document found in Logan's estate leads Roman to serve as co-CEO with Kendall, and the brothers attempt to undermine the GoJo deal. Increasingly insecure, Roman fires Waystar entertainment head Joy Palmer as well as Gerri after they question his authority. On election night, he pressures ATN to call the race for Mencken in exchange for regulatory support against GoJo, despite unresolved vote counts. Roman later breaks down while attempting to deliver Logan's eulogy, and after Mencken abandons him in favor of Shiv's alliance with Matsson, an ashamed Roman provokes an assault by protesters. Subsequently, Roman initially supports Kendall for CEO, but turns against him after Kendall claims he lied about his role in the fatal car accident during Shiv's wedding and then attacks Roman in a rage. Roman ultimately votes to approve the GoJo acquisition and is last seen having a moment to himself at a bar, finally free of the conflict for control of Waystar.

=== Shiv Roy ===
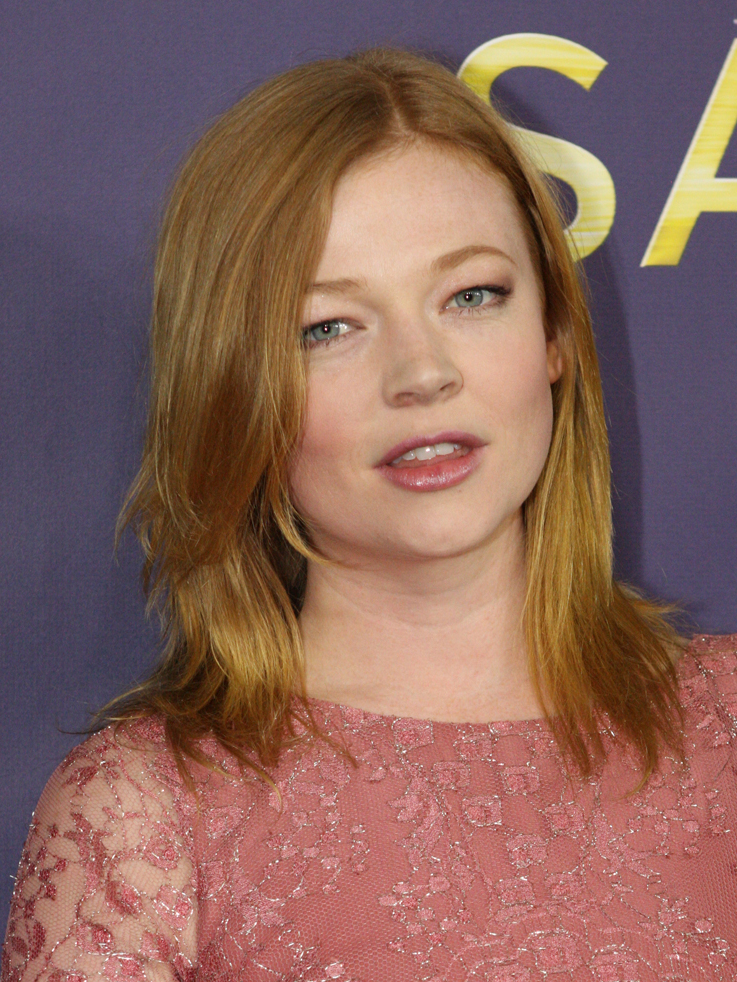
Sarah Snook

Siobhan "Shiv" Roy (portrayed by Sarah Snook) is the youngest child and only daughter of Logan Roy from his second marriage. She is a left-leaning political fixer who previously distanced herself from her family company until finally receiving an offer of leadership from Logan. She is married to Tom Wambsgans, whom she loves but frequently disregards.

During her childhood, Shiv had an acrimonious relationship with her mother Caroline following her parents' divorce; Caroline resented the time they did not get to spend together, blaming Shiv for her supposed preference for Logan. Shiv is implied to have been herself treated preferentially among the children by her father - who affectionately calls her "Pinky" - but Logan focused his efforts solely on Kendall and Roman in grooming his potential successors.

Shiv begins the series largely removed from Waystar Royco, working for Democratic political figures such as Gil Eavis while resisting involvement in the company. After being privately promised the CEO position by Logan, she abandons politics to pursue a leadership role at Waystar, but is repeatedly sidelined, given ambiguous titles, and excluded from real authority. She plays a role in helping the company weather several crises, including helping Logan facilitate his unsuccessful bid for Pierce Global Media (PGN) amid a proxy battle, talking a sexual assault victim from Waystar's cruises out of testifying, and negotiating a shareholder settlement with Stewy and Sandi. Her marriage to Tom deteriorates as she minimizes his legal jeopardy during the cruises scandal and later learns he betrayed her by informing Logan of the siblings’ attempted veto of the GoJo sale. In the final season, Shiv is separated from Tom and secretly pregnant while attempting to position herself as a viable alternative to her brothers after Logan's death. She covertly aligns with Lukas Matsson to advance the GoJo acquisition and believes she has secured the CEO role, only to discover Matsson intends to install Tom instead. Although Shiv initially joins Kendall and Roman in opposing the sale, she ultimately casts the deciding board vote to approve the acquisition due to her misgivings about Kendall, enabling Tom to become CEO. She is last seen leaving with him, her direct claim to power lost but her proximity to it preserved.

=== Tom Wambsgans ===
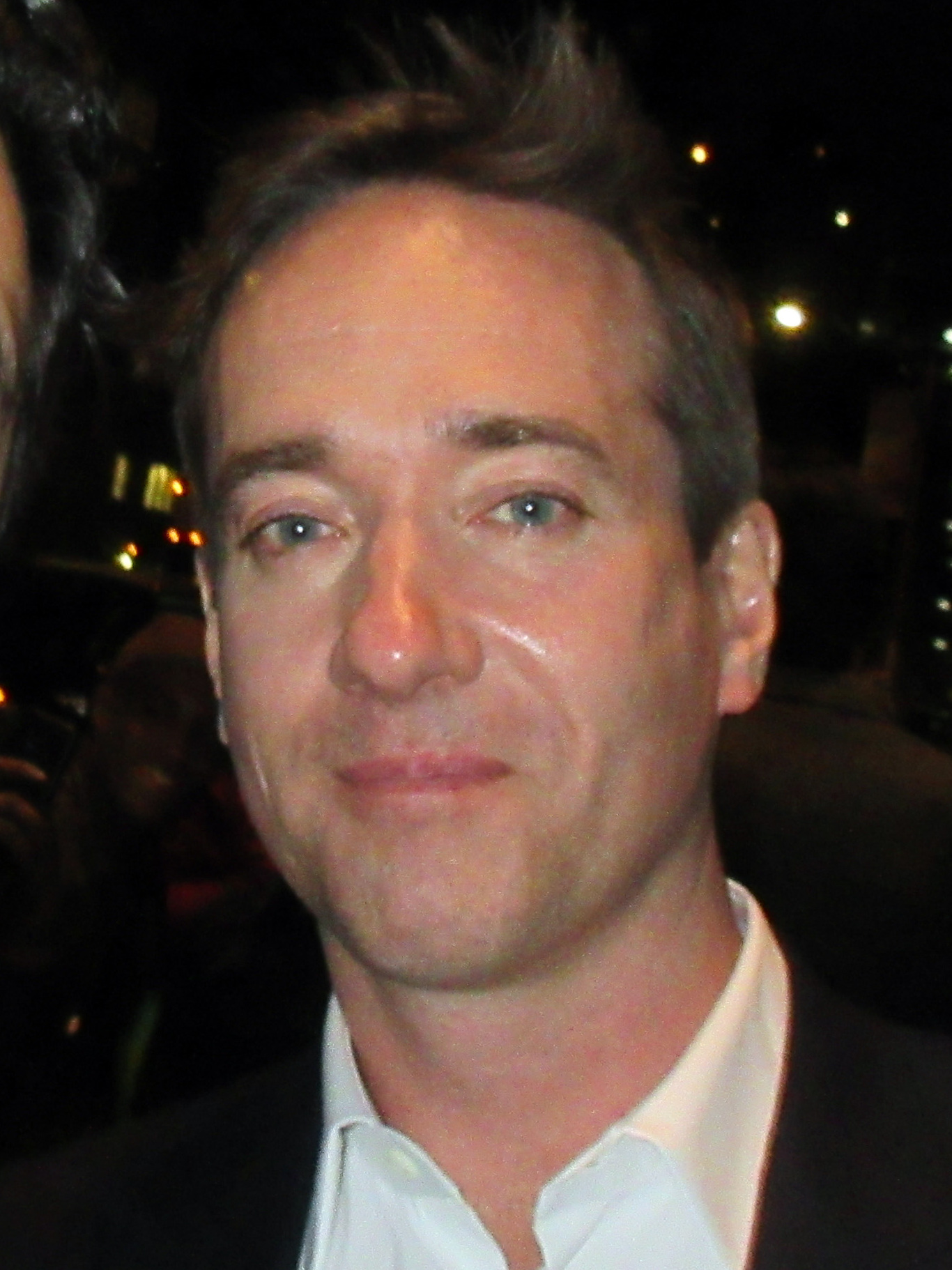
Matthew Macfadyen

Tom Wambsgans (Matthew Macfadyen) is Shiv's fiancé and later husband, and a Waystar executive. He is promoted from heading the amusement park and cruise division to running ATN, the company's global news outlet. He is a people-pleaser and enjoys his proximity to the Roy family's power but is frequently dismissed by the family's inner circle, and uses underlings like Greg to wield his power. He is originally from St. Paul, Minnesota.

At the outset of the series, Tom is appointed head of Waystar's Parks & Cruises division, where he inherits documents detailing a long-running cover-up of sexual misconduct on the company's cruise lines. Panicked, he confides in Greg and briefly considers exposing the scandal, but on Gerri's advice orders the evidence destroyed, unaware Greg has kept copies. His personal life deteriorates in parallel: he has an awkward sexual encounter at his bachelor party, and at his wedding Shiv admits to an affair with Nate Sofrelli and asks for an open marriage. Tom agrees, suppressing his resentment, and ejects Nate from the wedding. He remains publicly loyal to Shiv despite the imbalance in their relationship.

After Stewy and Sandy launch a takeover bid, Shiv secures Tom a promotion to Chair of Global Broadcast News at ATN. Tom attempts to assert authority and sideline network head Cyd Peach, but his confidence collapses when he learns Shiv has been offered the CEO role he hoped to inherit. As the cruises scandal breaks, Greg blackmails Tom with the retained documents; Tom later forces Greg to destroy them during an internal investigation, though Greg withholds some. Tom performs poorly at the Senate hearings regarding the scandal and realizes he has been positioned as a potential scapegoat, though Logan ultimately selects Kendall instead.

Tom remains loyal to Logan as Kendall wages a public campaign against him. Expecting prison, Tom offers himself as a sacrificial option to Logan and becomes increasingly anxious as legal exposure mounts. His humiliation deepens when Shiv is appointed President of Domestic Operations, making her his superior, and his push for a child further strains their marriage. When Shiv, Kendall, and Roman plan to block the sale of Waystar to streaming giant GoJo, Tom betrays them by informing Logan, allowing the plan to be neutralized and securing Tom's place in the company.

Six months later, Tom is embedded in Logan's inner circle but separated from Shiv and pursuing a divorce, unaware she is pregnant. He accompanies Logan to Sweden to renegotiate the GoJo deal, but Logan dies on the flight; Tom informs the siblings of their father's passing. Afterwards, Tom maneuvers to remain indispensable during the ensuing succession fight. On the eve of the election, Tom and Shiv have a brutal argument over their marriage, fueled by his fear of being discarded by Matsson. On election night, as head of ATN, Tom oversees the network's decision to call the race for Jeryd Mencken despite unresolved results, and learns of Shiv's pregnancy. After Shiv brokers Mencken's approval for the GoJo deal on the condition that an American CEO be installed, Matsson selects Tom over Shiv, finding him more compliant and trustworthy. At the final board vote, Shiv votes the acquisition through due to her misgivings about Kendall, resulting in Tom being named CEO.

=== Greg Hirsch ===
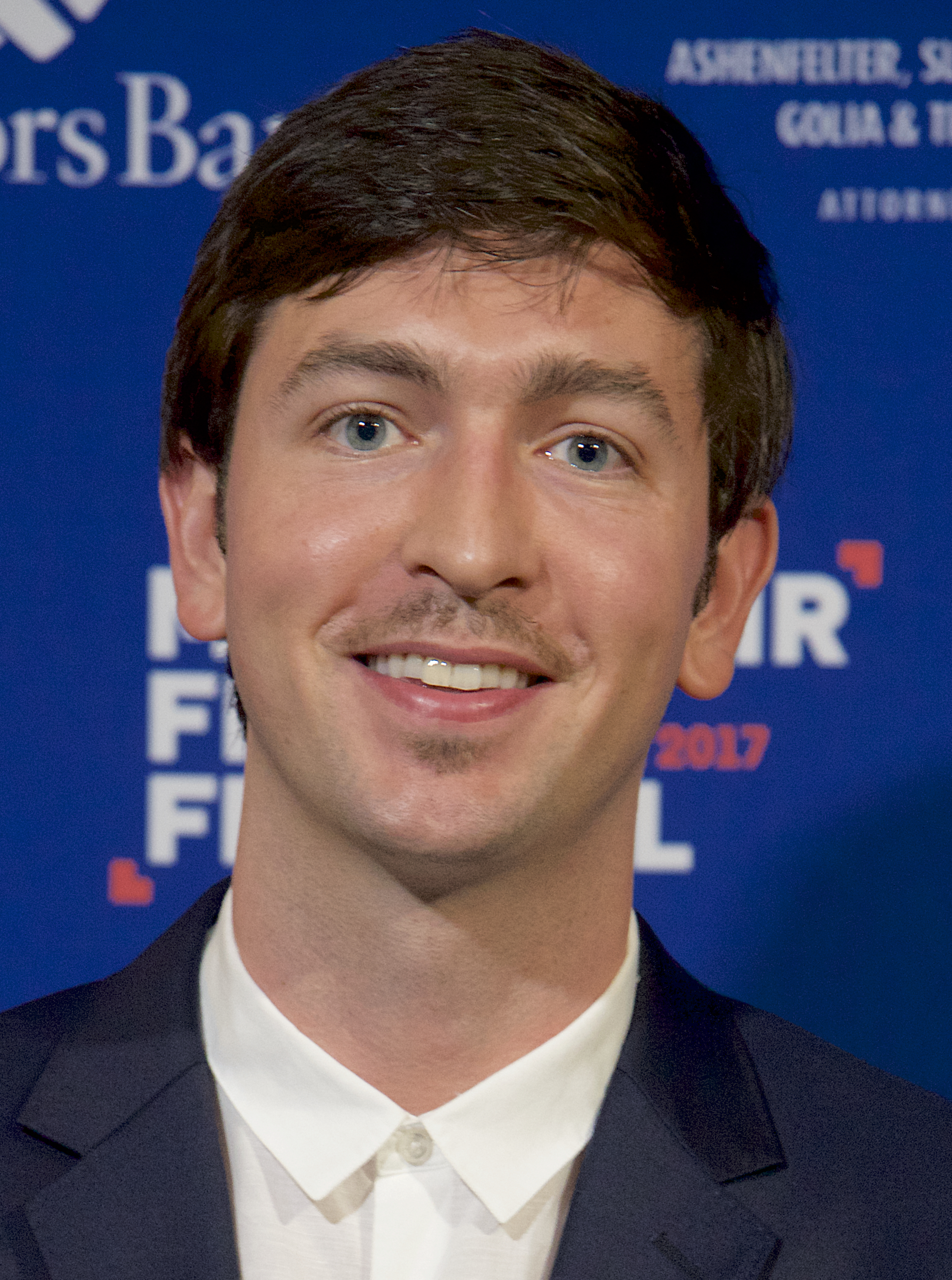
Nicholas Braun

Gregory Hirsch (Nicholas Braun) is Logan's great-nephew and grandson of Ewan Roy. Though he is presented as bumbling and awkward, Greg is shown to possess a keen instinct for survival and a penchant for scheming. Initially unfamiliar with the Roys and their corporate culture, Greg begins the series working at a Waystar theme park, where he is fired on his first day after vomiting inside a mascot costume. At his mother Marianne's urging, he attends Logan Roy's 80th birthday and asks for a job, which brings him into contact with the rest of the family. Greg quickly becomes attached to Tom Wambsgans, who identifies him as vulnerable and easy to manipulate.

Greg is drawn into the Parks & Cruises division after Tom discovers internal documents detailing a long-standing cover-up of sexual misconduct on Waystar's cruise lines. Tom confides in Greg and briefly considers exposing the scandal, but after Greg secretly alerts Gerri Kellman, Tom is persuaded to destroy the evidence. Greg complies but secretly makes copies of the documents, later revealing their existence to Kendall at Shiv and Tom's wedding, impressing Kendall and establishing leverage.

Greg grows closer to Kendall in the following months, running errands for him, supplying drugs, and receiving a luxury Manhattan apartment in return. After Tom is promoted to Chair of Global Broadcast News, Greg joins ATN, where he is uncomfortable with the network's right-wing politics. He reveals to Tom that he kept copies of the cruises documents and blackmails him for a promotion, which Tom grants. When the scandal becomes public and Waystar faces investigation, Tom forces Greg to destroy the documents; Greg burns most of them but secretly keeps some. Despite his grandfather Ewan's threat to disinherit him unless he leaves Waystar, Greg stays after Logan promises protection and later brings the documents to Kendall's press conference accusing Logan of overseeing the cover-up.

Following the press conference, Greg becomes paranoid about legal exposure and turns to Ewan, who hires attorney Roger Pugh to represent him. Realizing Ewan and Pugh intend to use him as leverage against Waystar, Greg abandons Kendall after Logan urges him to negotiate his position and sign a joint defense agreement. This decision alienates Kendall and leads Ewan to cut Greg out of his inheritance, donating his estate to Greenpeace, prompting Greg to attempt to sue the organization. During this period, Greg dates Kendall's assistant Comfry. At Caroline's wedding, Greg accepts Tom's promise of advancement, shortly before Tom informs Logan of the siblings’ attempt to block the GoJo sale.

Six months later, Greg and Tom cultivate a reputation in New York as playboys while Tom is separated from Shiv. After Logan's death, Greg tries to ingratiate himself with the Roy siblings and proves useful at ATN by carrying out mass firings. He gains the confidence of GoJo CEO Lukas Matsson, who tells him that Shiv is secretly assisting GoJo's acquisition of Waystar. Greg relays this information to Tom and later Kendall on election night, and ultimately carries out Tom's order to have ATN call the race for Jeryd Mencken despite clear irregularities. Before the final board vote, Greg learns that Tom—not Shiv—will be named CEO and leaks this to Kendall, prompting a last attempt to block the deal. After the acquisition is approved and Tom is appointed CEO, Greg cautiously approaches him and is retained, his mixed loyalty deemed useful.

=== Marcia Roy ===
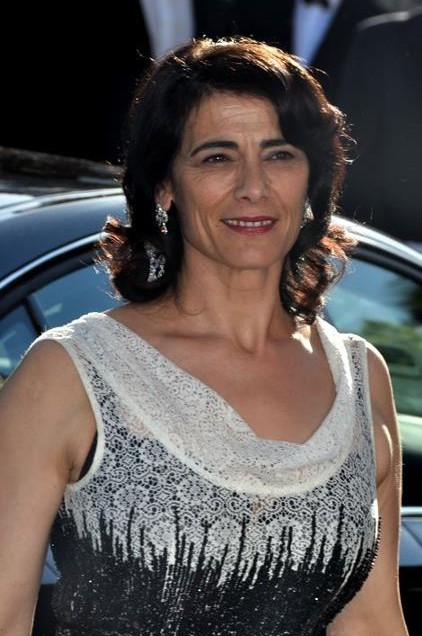
Hiam Abbass

Marcia (played by Hiam Abbass) is the third wife of Logan Roy. Born and raised in Beirut, she is often at odds with Logan's children, whose trust she has yet to earn. She has a son, Amir, from her first marriage, as well as an unnamed daughter. She is a main cast member in the first two seasons and appears in a recurring capacity in seasons three and four.

Marcia is initially positioned as Logan's closest confidante and primary beneficiary after he revises his trust in her favor, a move that immediately alarms his children. Following Logan's stroke, Marcia oversees his recovery and attempts to present a unified family front, while privately expressing disdain for the Roy children, whom she views as spoiled and entitled. Along with her son Amir, Marcia becomes aware of Kendall's involvement in a fatal car accident and is complicit in Logan's subsequent cover-up.

As corporate pressure mounts from Stewy Hosseini and Sandy Furness's takeover bid, Marcia urges Logan to consider selling Waystar, citing his age and obstinacy, advice he resents and increasingly ignores. Their marriage deteriorates further as Logan pursues the acquisition of Pierce Global Media and grows close to its CEO, Rhea Jarrell; Marcia publicly humiliates Logan at a family dinner with the Pierces, and later confronts him after he names Rhea his successor without consulting her, effectively separating from him. After Kendall's public accusation over the cruises scandal, Logan summons Marcia to Sarajevo to stage a public reconciliation, which she agrees to only after securing significant financial and legal protections for herself and her children.

Following Logan's death, Marcia controls access to his legacy, overseeing the wake and funeral, selling their apartment to Connor, while dismissing Logan's assistant and mistress Kerry from the proceedings. At Logan's funeral, she shares a moment of camaraderie with Logan's ex-wife Caroline and his two mistresses, and later tells Shiv that Logan ultimately broke her heart as he did his children's.

=== Rava Roy ===
Rava Roy (Natalie Gold) is Kendall's estranged wife, with whom he has two children. She appears as a main cast member in season one only, and returns in a guest role in seasons three and four.

Rava and Kendall's marriage breaks down as a result of the latter's drug addiction, and she divorces him. The two remain friendly and even have sex again after Logan's stroke, but Rava is insistent on continuing with the divorce; Kendall, who still yearns for her approval, is dismayed. Rava soon learns at Shiv's wedding that Kendall has relapsed into drug usage, and the two distance themselves from one another, though Kendall still occasionally sees his children.

After his bombshell press conference naming his father responsible for covering up the Brightstar Cruises scandal, Kendall arrives unannounced at Rava's apartment and begins using it as a temporary base of operations, to her quiet chagrin. Rava later tells Kendall at his 40th birthday that Waystar has sent men to harass her and the family over Kendall's poor parenting. After Waystar backs far-right Congressman Jeryd Mencken for the presidency, Rava tells Kendall that their daughter Sophie is being harassed by racist ATN viewers as well as facing scrutiny at school for her family's association with ATN, but Kendall refuses to accept responsibility. The morning after the election, the same day as Logan's funeral, street protests break out over Mencken's presidential win; Rava refuses to take the kids to the funeral out of concern for their safety, triggering an argument with Kendall, who unsuccessfully attempts to stop her from leaving.

== Other main cast members ==
=== Frank Vernon ===
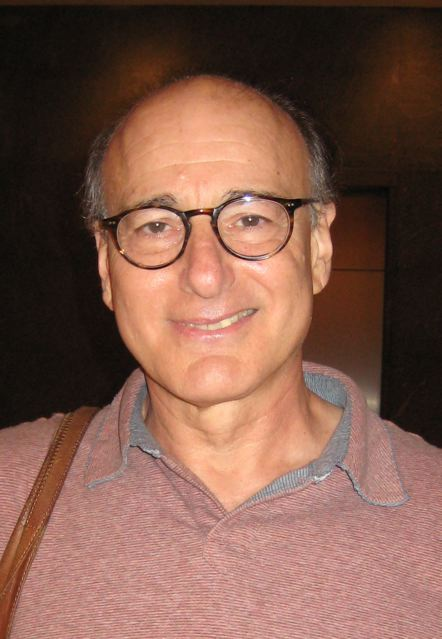
Peter Friedman

Francis "Frank" Vernon (portrayed by Peter Friedman) is the chief operating officer of Waystar RoyCo. He is a longtime confidant of Logan Roy, and a member of his old guard, having been with the company for 30 years. He is godfather and mentor to Kendall, who frequently relies on him to help win back Logan's favor. He is disliked by Roman, which stems from their days working together at the Los Angeles branch of Waystar.

=== Alessandro Daniels ===
Alessandro (played by Parker Sawyers) is an executive of Waystar RoyCo, who is present during the Vaulter acquisition meetings.

Sawyers is credited with the main cast in the pilot episode only. The character was dropped from the show when it was picked up for series, with Gerri filling a similar role from the second episode onwards.

=== Lawrence Yee ===
Lawrence Yee (Rob Yang) is the founder of the media website Vaulter that is acquired by Waystar RoyCo. He holds great contempt for Waystar and Kendall in particular, with whom he is often at odds. Although he is credited in every episode of the first two seasons, he is phased quickly out of the show, with only two appearances in season two, after Vaulter is shut down by Kendall. He is mentioned several times in the series finale as a potential candidate for the CEO of Waystar RoyCo if Matsson's acquisition goes through, but does not appear on-camera.

=== Gerri Kellman ===
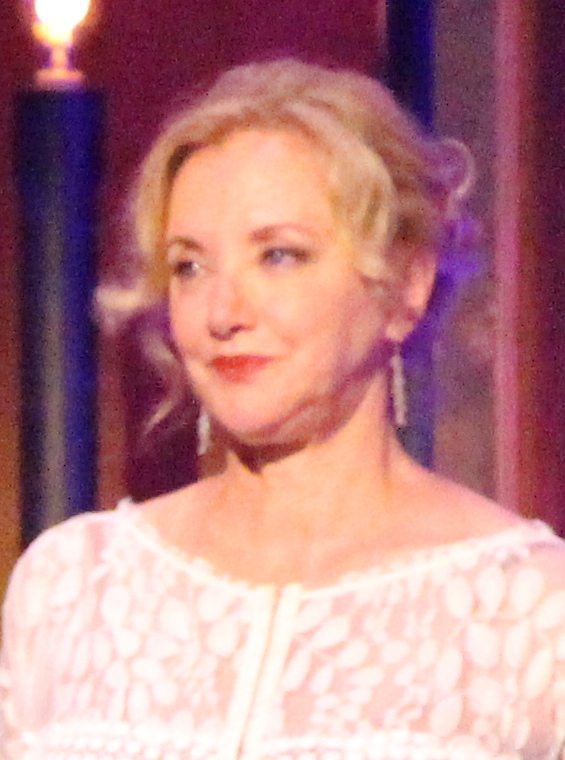
J. Smith-Cameron

Gerri Kellman (played by J. Smith-Cameron) is the general counsel to Waystar RoyCo. She has been with the company for 20 years. She is Shiv's godmother and a close confidante of the Roys, in particular Roman. Eventually, Roman initiates a sexual dynamic between them that involves her verbally humiliating him, though she declines to have actual intercourse.

She first appears in "Shit Show at the Fuck Factory" and continues in a recurring role through the first season, before being promoted to the main cast from season two. In the third season, Logan temporarily steps back as CEO after Kendall publicly exposes his role in covering up the Brightstar Cruises sexual misconduct scandal. Gerri is named acting CEO in his place. She leverages her contacts at the Department of Justice to contain the legal fallout from the cruises scandal, reducing Waystar's penalty to just a fine (albeit a hefty one).

Gerri and Roman's relationship becomes fraught, and ultimately leads to disastrous consequences for both of them. Roman gets into the habit of randomly sending her pictures of his genitalia, and ends up sending one to his father by mistake. Upset by his son's behavior and relationship with a much older woman, Logan also develops doubts about retaining Gerri's services in light of a potential scandal, and feels further threatened by her presence after selling Waystar to GoJo. He decides to fire her for her perceived mishandling of the fallout from the cruises scandal. Roman is tasked with delivering her the unsavory news at Connor's wedding, but Logan dies shortly thereafter, and Gerri remains on Waystar's executive team. However, Roman himself decides to impulsively fire Gerri after she reprimands him for firing Joy Palmer, head of Waystar Studios. He regrets his decision and attempts to reverse course, but Gerri tells him she has negotiated a hefty severance agreement, and that she will publicly sue Roman for sexual harassment if her demands are not met.

=== Willa Ferreyra ===
Willa Ferreyra (Justine Lupe) is Connor's younger girlfriend, and later wife. She is a call girl and aspiring playwright, who eventually leaves sex work when Connor asks her to enter an exclusive relationship with him in exchange for an allowance, which Willa accepts somewhat reluctantly as a means to pursue her career in theatre. Willa's play "The Sands" is staged at great expense by Connor and is a critical and commercial failure. She is passively supportive of his presidential campaign and is deeply hesitant when Connor proposes but ultimately agrees to marry him. Willa later expresses deep doubts about marrying Connor and walks out of their rehearsal dinner, leaving him to wonder anxiously if she will show up the next day. When Connor receives the news on their wedding day that Logan has died, he and Willa consider postponing, and Connor asks her plainly if she is only with him for money. She admits that she's attracted to the security of his wealth, but is nonetheless happy with him, and the two marry as planned, but with few guests in attendance. She first appears in "Shit Show at the Fuck Factory" and continues in a recurring role through the first two seasons, before being promoted to main cast from season three.

=== Karolina Novotney ===
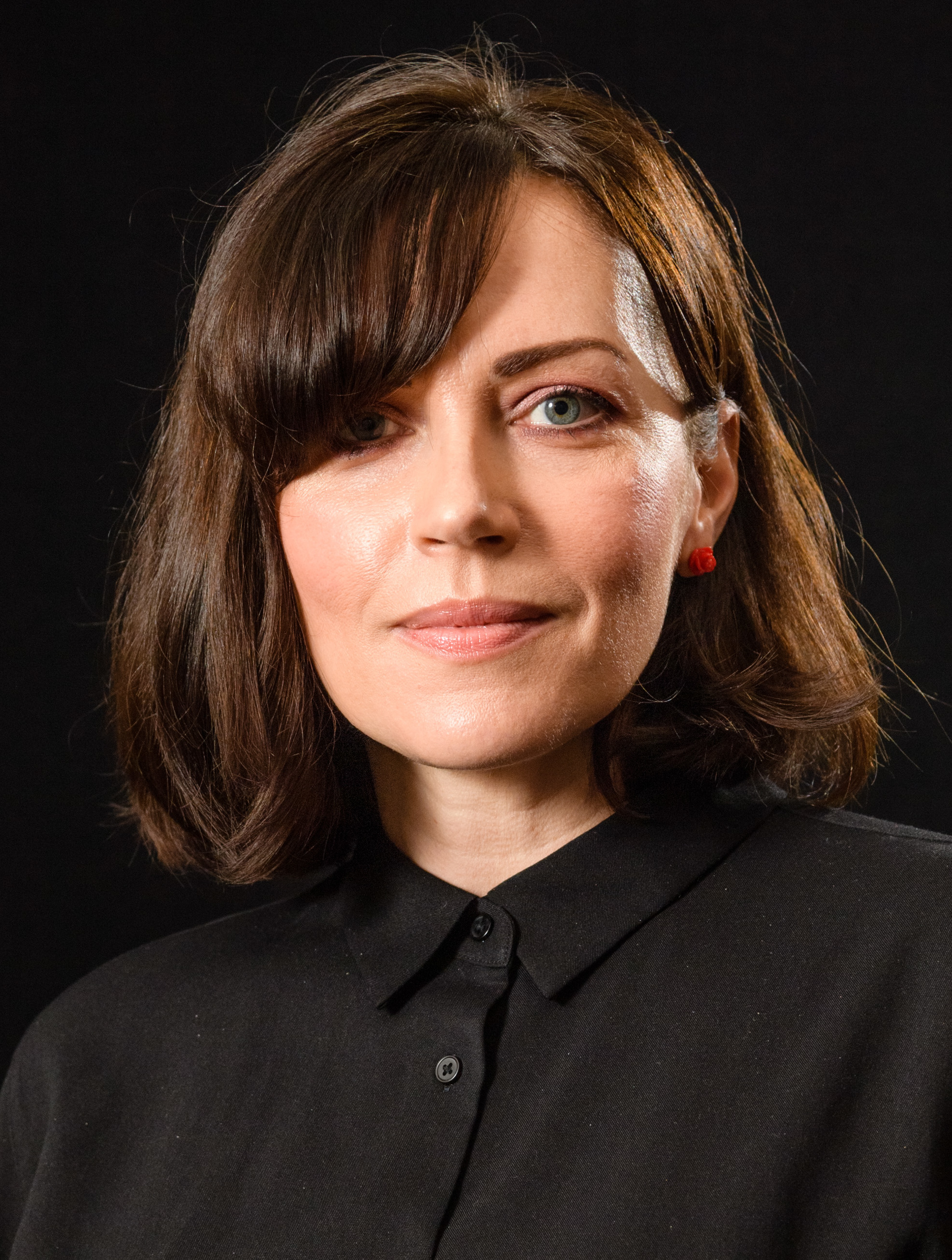
Dagmara Domińczyk

Karolina Novotney (Dagmara Domińczyk) is the head of public relations at Waystar RoyCo. She first appears in "Shit Show at the Fuck Factory" and continues in a recurring role through the first season, before being promoted to main cast from season two. As the series continues, she develops a hostile rivalry with one of her executives, Hugo, as he continues to ingratiate himself with the senior cadre of the company.

=== Karl Muller ===
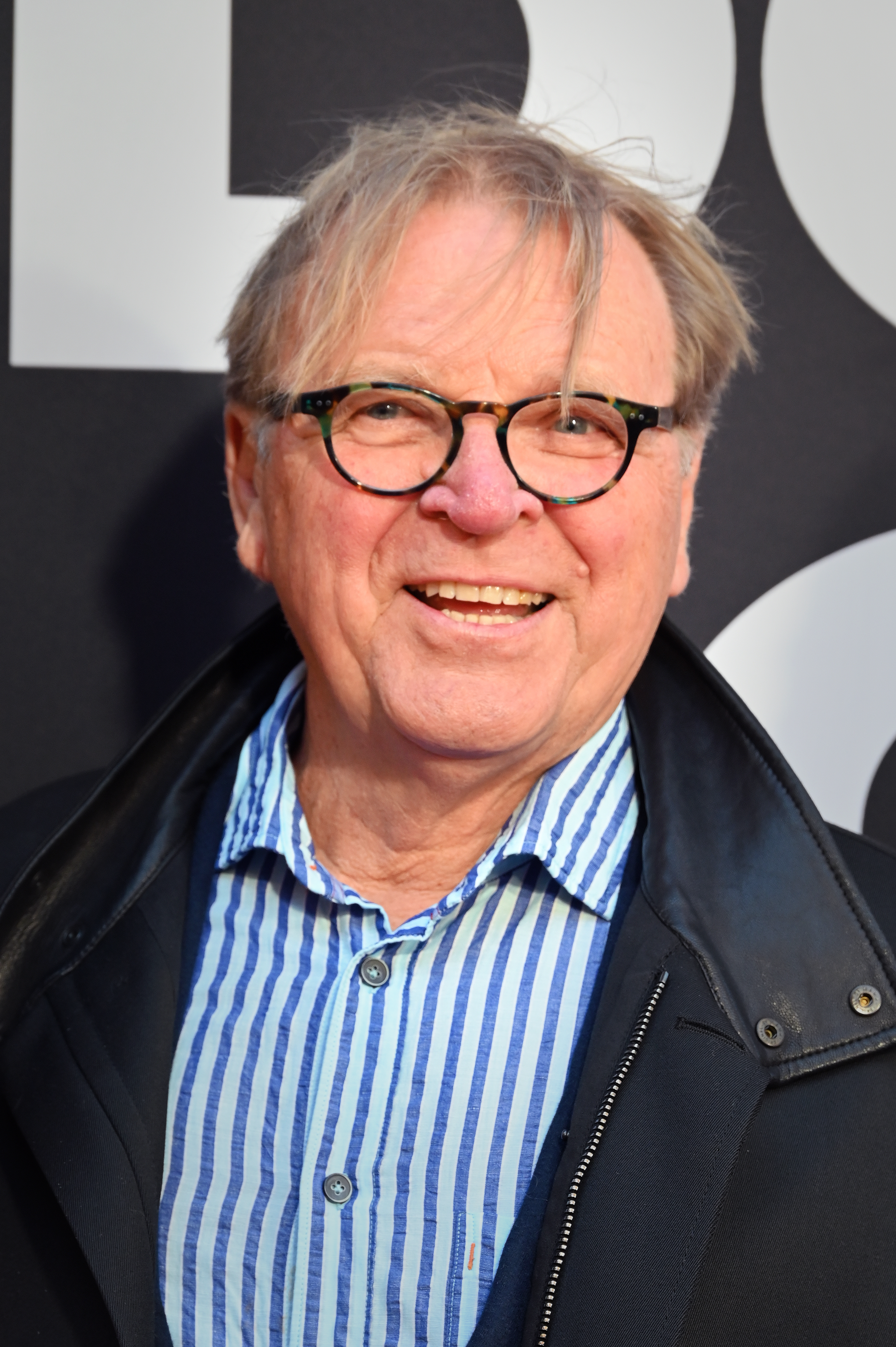
David Rasche

Karl Muller (portrayed by David Rasche) is Waystar RoyCo's chief financial officer. He first appears in "Shit Show at the Fuck Factory" and continues in a recurring role through the first two seasons, before being promoted to main cast from season three.

Karl has worked at Waystar for 23 years and is one of Logan's most trusted associates; he is suggested to have negotiated a major cable news deal in the 1990s, and is implied to frequently solicit prostitutes. He helps Logan defend the company against Stewy and Sandy's takeover bid, though he and most of senior management are opposed to Logan's planned acquisition of Pierce Global Media (PGM). Logan forces Karl along with Tom and Greg to participate in a vicious hazing ritual called "Boar on the Floor" to root out the source of a leak to the Pierces regarding his acquisition plans, though he soon learns that Roman was the one who made the call. Karl accompanies Roman and Jamie Laird, Logan's financial adviser, to Turkey to make a pitch to Azerbaijani billionaire Eduard Asgarov to finance Waystar's privatization. Despite making a successful pitch, Roman admits to Logan that the offer is likely illegitimate, which Karl backs up.

As CFO, Karl is key to finalizing the details of Logan's sale of Waystar to Lukas Matsson, founder and CEO of streaming giant GoJo. After Logan's death, Karl and Frank discover a document in his safe naming Kendall his successor; Karl is concerned, since he plans to retire soon and purchase a Greek island with his brother-in-law, and does not want the company jeopardized at the end of his tenure. Kendall and Roman become co-CEOs, where they spearhead negotiations with Matsson and obtain an offer for $192 per share. GoJo sends a "kill list" consisting of Waystar employees they want to terminate in favor of their own team; Karl is happy to be included on the list given his impending retirement and subsequent payout (referred to as his "golden parachute").

=== Stewy Hosseini ===
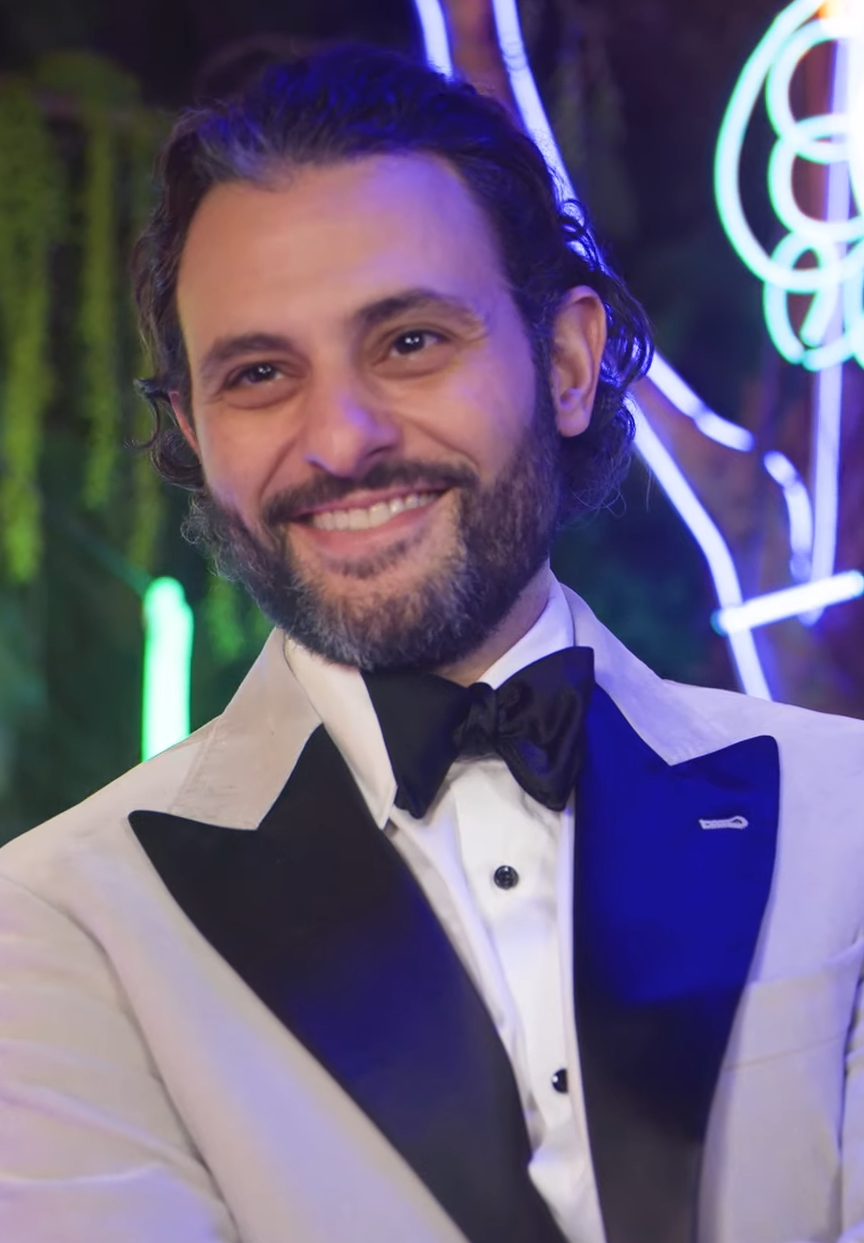
Arian Moayed

Stewy Hosseini (Arian Moayed) is Kendall's friend from college. He is a private-equity investor with a seat on Waystar's board, and is covertly in partnership with Logan's rival Sandy Furness. He first appears in "Lifeboats" and continues in a recurring role through the first season, before being promoted to main cast in season two. He returns in a guest role in season three.

After Logan Roy's stroke, Kendall turns to Stewy for emergency financing when he learns Waystar is heavily leveraged and at risk of triggering a debt recall. Stewy agrees to inject $4 billion into the company in exchange for a board seat. When Kendall plots a vote of no confidence, Stewy abstains, allowing the effort to fail and preserving his relationship with Logan. Stewy subsequently reveals to Kendall his partnership with Logan's rival Sandy Furness and proposes buying Kendall out, prompting Kendall instead to pursue a hostile takeover with Stewy and Sandy holding control. The bid is delivered during Shiv's wedding, but collapses after Kendall withdraws under pressure from Logan after getting involved in a fatal car accident that kills a waiter.

Stewy and Sandy continue a proxy battle for control, refusing Logan's later offer to abandon the fight in exchange for privatization financing. After the cruises scandal and Kendall's public denunciation of Logan, Stewy entertains renewed negotiations, and eventually reaches a settlement granting both sides additional board representation. In the final season, Stewy and Sandi attempt to use the siblings to force a higher price in the GoJo acquisition. Following Logan's death, Stewy supports Kendall's bid for leadership, advocating for Kendall and Roman to serve as co-CEOs, while continuing to position himself advantageously regardless of the company's ultimate ownership.

=== Hugo Baker ===
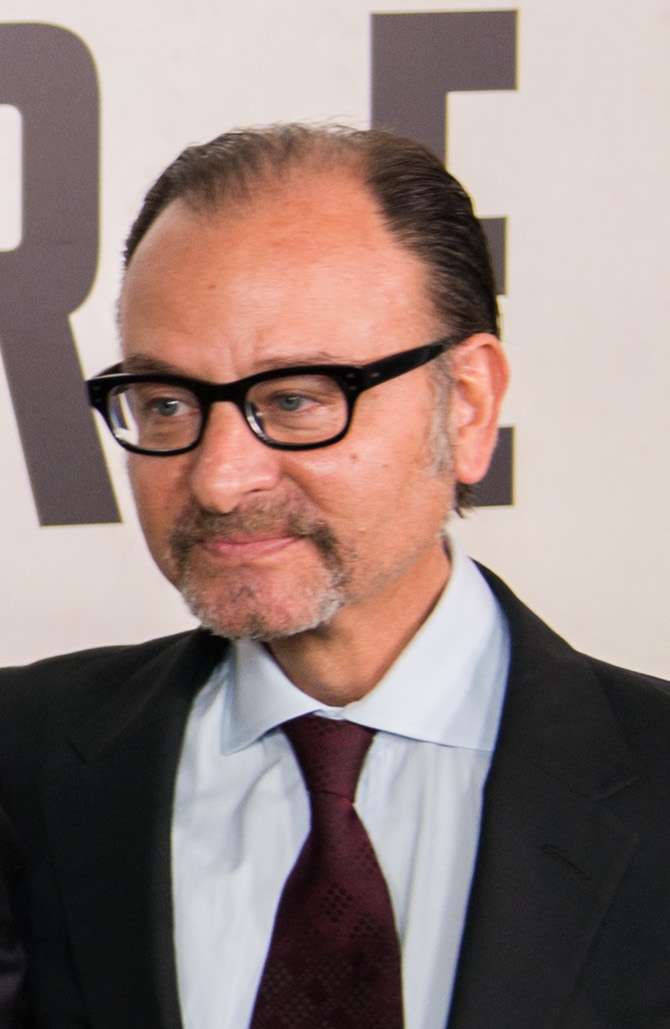
Fisher Stevens

Hugo Baker (Fisher Stevens) is a Senior Vice President of communications at Waystar RoyCo. He is in charge of managing a scandal involving Brightstar cruise lines. He first appears in "Argestes" and continues in a recurring role through season two, before being promoted to main cast from season three onwards. Hugo, described as an "ass-kissing sycophant" by Stevens, is nonetheless shown to be conniving and opportunistic, frequently attempting to pass on responsibility to Karolina, his superior, during times of company crisis. Stevens suggested that Hugo both respects Karolina and yearns for her job, as well as harboring an unrequited attraction towards her. Hugo also has an "antagonistic" relationship with Tom, the two harboring mutual contempt for each other for their perceived obsequiousness.

Hugo begins working permanently alongside Waystar's senior management from the cruises scandal onwards. When Logan dies in the fourth season, Hugo informs his daughter Juliet, who goes on to sell her Waystar shares prior to news of Logan's death going public; Hugo is alarmed at the potential insider trading scandal and asks Kendall's help in containing it. Kendall uses this information to leverage Hugo into discreetly launching a PR campaign questioning Logan's health and decision-making in the time leading up to his death.

When Waystar's senior team travels to Norway to finalize their acquisition by tech giant GoJo, they learn GoJo has opted to retain most of its own management team in the acquisition, with Hugo among those on the "kill list" of employees to terminate. During Logan's funeral, Kendall enlists Hugo as a key aide in his planned takeover of Waystar, asking him to spread news stories about internal opposition to the GoJo deal in light of Waystar's escalating market cap. After the GoJo sale goes through and Tom is named CEO, he immediately decides to fire Hugo.

=== Lukas Matsson ===
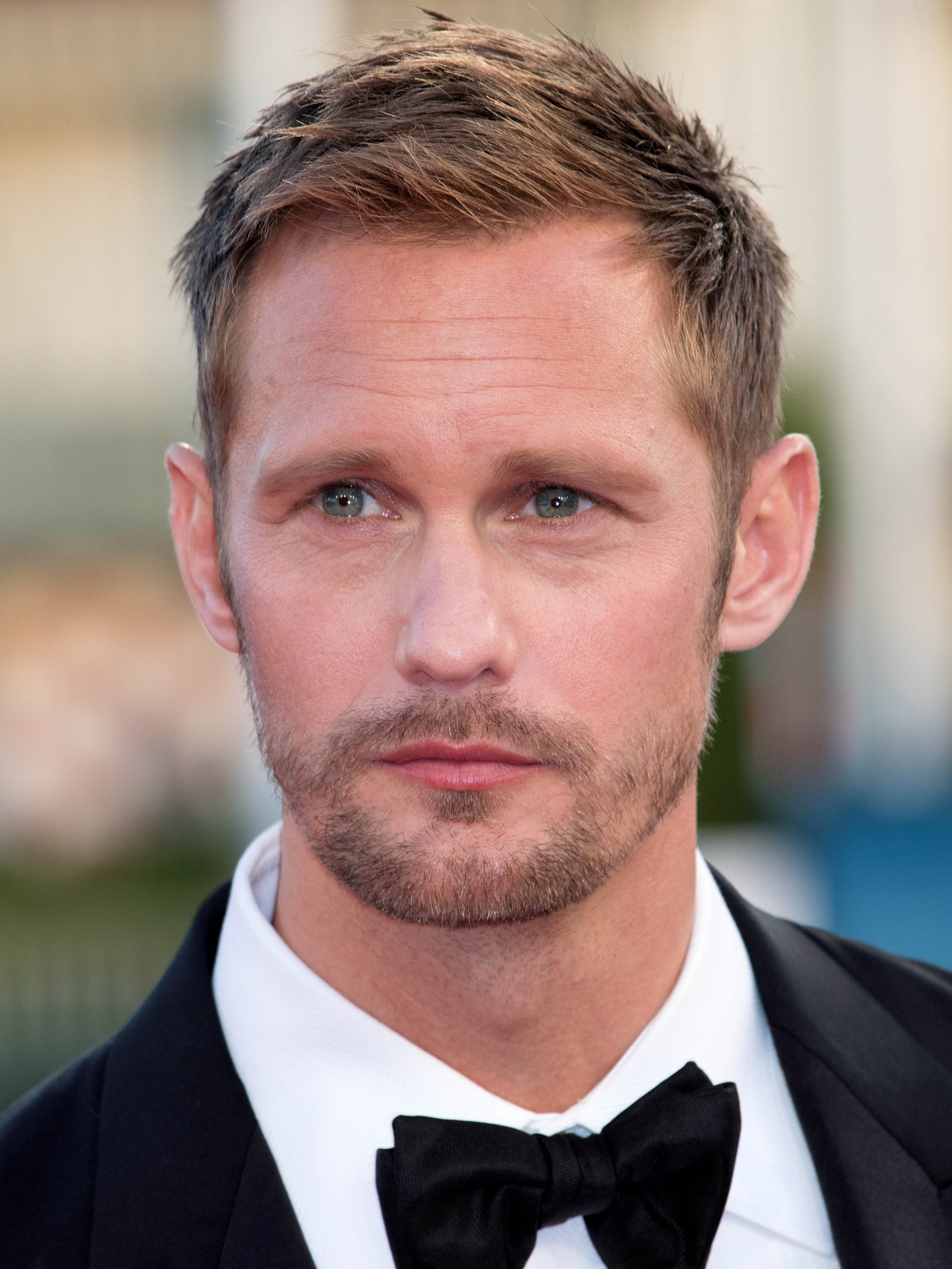
Alexander Skarsgård

Lukas Matsson (played by Alexander Skarsgård) is the eccentric Swedish founder and CEO of tech giant GoJo. The character has drawn comparisons to real-life figures such as Elon Musk, Peter Thiel and Daniel Ek. Skarsgård first appears as Matsson in "Too Much Birthday" and continues in a recurring role for the remainder of season 3, before being credited alongside the main cast in season 4 for the episodes in which he appears.

Logan initially plans for Waystar to acquire GoJo, and Roman draws Matsson's interest after meeting with him at Kendall's birthday party, despite Matsson's open disdain for Logan Roy and legacy media. Matsson later makes cryptic social media posts about GoJo's financing to inflate the company's valuation, and tells Roman he is in fact interested in a merger of equals. When Logan meets Matsson directly, Matsson proposes that GoJo acquire Waystar outright, citing Logan's age and the decline of traditional media, while promising Logan retained control of key assets, namely ATN. Logan accepts the deal without consulting his children, and thwarts their attempt to veto the deal.

Following Logan's death, Matsson takes a more aggressive and erratic role in negotiations, summoning Kendall and Roman to GoJo's retreat in Norway to renegotiate the acquisition. He offers a substantial premium per share but insists on absorbing ATN into GoJo, prompting resistance from the brothers, whom he dismisses as inferior to their father. When Kendall and Roman attempt to sabotage the deal, Matsson bypasses them by making a higher offer directly to Waystar's board. His position is briefly threatened when it is revealed that GoJo's subscriber numbers in India were significantly inflated, a potential scandal he asks Shiv to help manage. Shiv brokers political cover by negotiating regulatory approval with presidential candidate Jeryd Mencken in exchange for appointing an American CEO, leading her to believe she will be selected. Matsson ultimately rejects Shiv, citing concerns about her experience (as well as his sexual attraction to her), and instead appoints Tom, valuing his compliance and operational record. After Shiv casts the deciding vote to approve the sale, Matsson successfully completes GoJo's acquisition of Waystar and is last seen celebrating the deal with Tom and senior executives.

== Recurring characters and guest stars ==
- Marianne Roy Hirsch, played by Mary Birdsong (guest season 1, co-starring season 4), Greg's mother. Appears in "Celebration", "Shit Show at the Fuck Factory", and "Church and State".
- Grace, played by Molly Griggs (season 1), Roman's girlfriend. She has a daughter, Isla, from a previous relationship. She and Roman break up midway through the season. Appears in "Celebration", "Sad Sack Wasp Trap" and "I Went to Market". Grace and Isla were conceived as Roman's wife and daughter, before the direction of the character was amended after the filming of "Celebration".
- Eva, played by Judy Reyes (season 1), an executive producer at ATN, Waystar's primary news channel. She is presumably fired by Kendall, after she threatens one of her on-air personalities into being his date on an event. Appears in "Shit Show at the Fuck Factory", "Lifeboats" and "Sad Sack Wasp Trap".
- Sandy Furness, played by Larry Pine (seasons 1–4), the owner of a rival media conglomerate and a longtime enemy of Logan. He is in partnership with Stewy and backs his private-equity fund, Maesbury Capital. He eventually falls ill (rumored from syphilis) and has his daughter, Sandi, represent him in major negotiations. First appears in "Lifeboats" before continuing in a recurring role.
- Brex, played by Brock Yurich (season 1), Roman's personal trainer. Appears in "Lifeboats" and "I Went to Market".
- Nate Sofrelli, played by Ashley Zukerman (seasons 1–4), a political strategist. He is a former romantic partner of Shiv's who convinces her to work on the Eavis presidential campaign, reigniting their former affair. First appears in "Lifeboats" before continuing in a recurring role.
- Bill Lockhart, played by Mark Blum (seasons 1–2), the retiring head of Waystar RoyCo's Adventure Parks division, responsible for covering up a scandal involving decades of sexual misconduct on the company cruise lines. Appears in "Sad Sack Wasp Trap" and "DC".
- Anna Newman, played by Annika Boras (season 1), an on-air personality at ATN. She is threatened by Eva into going as Kendall's date to the family's annual charity event, the Roy Endowment Creative New York (RECNY) ball. Appears in "Sad Sack Wasp Trap".
- Joyce Miller, played by Eisa Davis (season 1), the former Attorney General of New York elected to a seat in the United States Senate. Shiv initially serves as her political strategist, with her husband's nude photo scandal causing tensions between Shiv and her family. Zoë Chao plays one of her staff members. Appears in "Sad Sack Wasp Trap" and "Which Side Are You On?"
- Ewan Roy, played by James Cromwell (seasons 1–4), Logan's estranged older brother and Greg's grandfather. He resides in Canada where he lives alone as a rancher. Staunchly left-wing, he personally despises Logan and his business empire, once comparing his brother to Adolf Hitler due to Waystar's role in promoting climate change denial through the ATN news network. However, Ewan stops short of actively working against his brother and has a position on Waystar-Royco's board of directors. First appears in "I Went to Market" before continuing in a recurring role.
- Paul Chambers, played by David Patrick Kelly (season 1, 4), a member of Waystar RoyCo's board. He opposes a vote of no confidence in regards to Logan. Appears in "Which Side Are You On?" and "With Open Eyes".
- Gil Eavis, played by Eric Bogosian (season 1–2), a Democratic presidential candidate and United States Senator from Pennsylvania. He is vocally opposed to Waystar RoyCo's attempted takeover of local news networks and becomes a target of their cable news network ATN because of it. Shiv briefly works for him, causing tensions with her family. He later becomes Daniel Jimenez's running mate. First appears in "Austerlitz" before continuing in a recurring role through the first two seasons.
- Dr. Alon Parfit, played by Griffin Dunne (season 1), a corporate therapist hired to work with the Roy family as Logan attempts to rehabilitate their public image. Appears in "Austerlitz".
- Angela, played by Lauren Patten (season 1), an art entrepreneur who is approached by Kendall as a client. She rejects him, unwilling to associate with the Roy name. Appears in "Prague".
- Tabitha Hayes, played by Caitlin FitzGerald (seasons 1–2), Roman's girlfriend. She previously had a sexual encounter with Tom at his bachelor party, and was also involved with Naomi Pierce. First appears uncredited in "Prague" before continuing in a recurring role through the first two seasons.
- Lady Caroline Collingwood, played by Harriet Walter (seasons 1–4), the second wife of Logan Roy, and mother to Kendall, Shiv, and Roman as well as a Waystar shareholder. She has a distant relationship with all three of her children, and even expresses to Shiv that she should not have become a mother. She resides in England, and gets remarried in Tuscany to British CEO Peter Munion, with whom she is suggested to have had a decades-long affair. First appears in "Pre-Nuptial" before continuing in a recurring role.
- Mr & Mrs. Wambsgans, played by Jack Gilpin and Kristin Griffith (season 1), Tom's parents. Tom's mother is a highly respected attorney in the Minneapolis–Saint Paul area. Appear in "Pre-Nuptial" and "Nobody is Ever Missing".
- Jamie Laird, played by Danny Huston (season 2), a banker and financier at Waystar RoyCo's branches. He advises Logan during the proxy battle against Stewy and Sandy, as well as during his attempted acquisition of rival news giant Pierce Global Media (PGM). First appears in "The Summer Palace" before continuing in a recurring role through season two.
- Colin Stiles, played by Scott Nicholson (seasons 2–4, co-starring season 1), Logan's body man. Appears in the background of nearly every episode, initially credited as a co-star before "The Summer Palace".
- Cyd Peach, played by Jeannie Berlin (seasons 2–4), the head of ATN. She butts heads with Tom after his promotion. Logan made plans to fire her prior to his death. First appears in "Vaulter" before continuing in a recurring role.
- Michelle Pantsil, played by Jessica Hecht (season 2), a writer researching an unauthorized biography of Logan. Appears in "Hunting" and "Safe Room".
- Chris, played by Saamer Usmani (season 2), an actor in Willa's play who has a one-night stand with Shiv. Appears in "Hunting" and "Dundee".
- Ray Kennedy, played by Patch Darragh (seasons 2–4), a Waystar executive in charge of the Parks & Cruises division. First appears in "Hunting" before continuing in a recurring role.
- Rhea Jarrell, played by Holly Hunter (season 2), CEO of PGM. She aligns herself with Logan during the attempted acquisition, and the two later become romantically involved. She is fired by Nan after the deal falls through, and is briefly named as Logan's successor as the CEO of Waystar, putting her into conflict with Shiv. First appears in "Safe Room" before continuing in a recurring role through season two.
- Brian, played by Zach Cherry (season 2), a Waystar management trainee who befriends Roman. Appears in "Safe Room".
- Mark Ravenhead, played by Zack Robidas (seasons 2–4, co-starring season 1), ATN's star anchor and alleged neo-Nazi who causes controversy for the Roys. Initially credited as a co-star before "Safe Room".
- Nan Pierce, played by Cherry Jones (season 2, 4), the de facto head of the Pierce family and majority owner of PGM. A liberal, she is hesitant to sell to the Roys because of their politics. Appears in "Tern Haven", "Argestes", and "The Munsters".
- Naomi Pierce, played by Annabelle Dexter-Jones (seasons 2–4), Nan's cousin and member of the Pierce family. She suffers from substance abuse and becomes romantically involved with Kendall. First appears in "Tern Haven" before continuing in a recurring role.
- Mark Pierce, played by Jeremy Shamos (season 2), a member of the Pierce family who is the recipient of two PhDs, and briefly comes at odds with Shiv. Appears in "Tern Haven".
- Maxim Pierce, played by Mark Linn-Baker (seasons 2–4), a member of the Pierce family who works as a consultant at the Brookings Institution and holds Connor's presidential ambitions in scorn. However, he later joins Connor's campaign as an advisor. First appears in "Tern Haven" before continuing in a recurring role.
- Peter Pierce, played by Max Gordon Moore (season 2), a member of the Pierce family known to be a voracious reader. Appears in "Tern Haven".
- Marnie Pierce, played by Christina Rouner (season 2), a member of the Pierce family who intimidates Tom and Roman at dinner. Appears in "Tern Haven".
- Eduard Asgarov, played by Babak Tafti (season 2), an Azerbaijani billionaire pursued by Roman for his money and ties to the Azerbaijani sovereign wealth. He co-owns the Heart of Midlothian Football Club with Roman. Appears in "Argestes", "Dundee" and "DC".
- Jennifer, played by Sydney Lemmon (season 2, 4), an actress in Willa's play who is briefly involved with Kendall. Appears in "Dundee" and "Rehearsal".
- James Weissel, played by Anthony Arkin (season 2), the whistleblower in the Brightstar Cruises sexual misconduct scandal. Nicknamed "The Weasel" by the Roys. Appears in "DC".
- Kira Mason, played by Sally Murphy (season 2), a victim of sexual harassment and abuse in Waystar's cruises division, where she formerly worked as an entertainment manager. Appears in "DC".
- Senator Ed Roberts, played by Victor Slezak (season 2), a Republican congressman present at the hearing for Waystar's sexual misconduct allegations. Appears in "DC" and "This Is Not for Tears".
- Susan Vardy, played by Debbye Turner Bell (season 2), a journalist who interviews James Weissel regarding the cruises scandal. Appears in "DC".
- Philippe Layton, played by Angus Wright (season 2), a high-profile Waystar shareholder who advises Logan to step down from the company amid the cruise line scandal. Appears in "This Is Not for Tears".
- Lisa Arthur, played by Sanaa Lathan (season 3), a high profile, well-connected New York lawyer who takes on Kendall as a client. She is personal friends with Shiv. First appears in "Secession", before continuing in a recurring role.
- Michelle-Anne Vanderhoven, played by Linda Emond (season 3), a senior White House aide and longtime friend and confidant of Logan's. She frequently acts as an intermediary between Logan and the President, who is never seen onscreen and simply known as "The Raisin," a derisive nickname used by the Roys. First appears in "Secession", before continuing in a recurring role.
- Jess Jordan, played by Juliana Canfield (seasons 3–4, co-starring seasons 1–2), Kendall's assistant. Appears in the background of nearly every episode, initially credited as a co-star before "Secession".
- Berry Schneider, played by Jihae (season 3), a leading public relations consultant hired by Kendall. First appears in "Secession", before continuing in a recurring role.
- Comfry Pellits, played by Dasha Nekrasova (season 3), a crisis PR representative working as an assistant to Berry, who forms a connection with Greg. First appears in "Secession", before continuing in a recurring role.
- Keith Zigler, played by Jordan Lage (season 3), Lisa's assistant. Appears in "Secession" before continuing in a recurring role.
- Remi, played by KeiLyn Durrel Jones (season 3), Kendall's body man. First appears in "Mass in Time of War", before continuing in a recurring role.
- Sandi Furness, played by Hope Davis (seasons 3–4), Sandy's daughter, who is aligned with Stewy in the proxy battle for Waystar's ownership. She largely negotiates on behalf of her ailing father. Appears in "Mass in Time of War" before continuing in a recurring role.
- Roger Pugh, played by Peter Riegert (season 3), Ewan's anticapitalist personal attorney whom Ewan hires to represent Greg. Appears in "Mass in Time of War" and "Retired Janitors of Idaho".
- Kerry Castellabate, played by Zoë Winters (seasons 3–4, co-starring season 2), Logan's secretary with whom he has a sexual relationship during season three and end up becoming his lover and allegedly fiancée before his death . Initially credited as a co-star before "The Disruption".
- Sophie Iwobi, played by Ziwe Fumudoh (season 3), a comedian and host of The Disruption, a late-night talk show that skewers Kendall. Appears in "The Disruption".
- Dylan, played by Succession writer Will Tracy (season 3), a writer for The Disruption. Appears in "The Disruption".
- Josh Aaronson, played by Adrien Brody (season 3), a billionaire activist shareholder with four percent equity in Waystar. He organizes a meeting between Kendall and Logan at his private island to determine whether their feud can be reconciled. Appears in "Lion in the Meadow". Additionally, Brody's likeness is digitally inserted into a crowd shot in "Retired Janitors of Idaho".
- Iverson Roy, played by Quentin Morales (season 3, costarring seasons 1–2), Kendall's son, who is implied to have autism. Initially credited as a co-star before "Lion in the Meadow".
- Sophie Roy, played by Swayam Bhatia (seasons 3–4, costarring seasons 1–2), Kendall's daughter. Initially credited as a co-star before "Lion in the Meadow".
- Jeryd Mencken, played by Justin Kirk (seasons 3–4), a controversial far-right Congressman from Virginia whom the Roys support for a presidential nomination. First appears in "What It Takes" before continuing in a recurring role.
- Dave Boyer, played by Reed Birney (season 3), the incumbent Vice President of the United States, who seeks political support from Logan for his own presidential run. He appears in "What It Takes".
- Ron Petkus, played by Stephen Root (seasons 3–4), a lecherous conservative political donor who organizes the Future Freedom Summit in Virginia. Appears in "What It Takes" and "Honeymoon States".
- Rick Salgado, played by Yul Vazquez (season 3), a Republican Congressman hoping to steer the party back towards traditional conservatism. He appears in "What It Takes".
- Peter Munion, played by Pip Torrens (seasons 3–4), a CEO with a string of failed marriages and business ventures that Caroline marries in Tuscany. He first appears in "Chiantishire".
- The Grand Duchess of Luxembourg, played by Ella Rumpf (season 3), an Italian contessa who works as an online brand ambassador. She accompanies Roman to Caroline's wedding, where Greg takes a romantic interest in her. She first appears in "Chiantishire".
- Bridget, played by Francesca Root-Dodson (season 4), Greg's dimwitted date at Logan's birthday party. She appears in "The Munsters".
- Tellis, played by Kevin Changaris (season 4), a financial advisor working for Kendall, Roman and Shiv. He appears in "The Munsters", Rehearsal" and "With Open Eyes".
- Oskar Guðjohnsen, played by Jóhannes Haukur Jóhannesson (season 4), a GoJo senior executive and Matsson's trusted confidante. First appears in "Honeymoon States" before continuing in a recurring role.
- Joy Palmer, played by Annabeth Gish (season 4), the head of Waystar Studios, who Roman impulsively fires after the disastrous production of the blockbuster Kalispitron: Hibernation. She appears in "Living+".
- Ebba, played by Eili Harboe (season 4), GoJo's head of communications and Matsson's ex-girlfriend, to whom he repeatedly sent frozen quantities of his own blood following their breakup. First appears in "Kill List" before continuing in a recurring role.
- Daniel Jimenez, played by Elliot Villar (season 4), the Governor of New York and Democratic nominee for the presidential race, running against Mencken. He appears in "America Decides".
- Darwin Perry, played by Adam Godley (season 4), a respected ATN poll analyst who tries to caution Tom and Roman about rushing to call the presidential election in Mencken's favor. He appears in "America Decides".

=== Notable co-stars ===
- Isla, played by Noelle Hogan (season 1), Grace's daughter from a previous relationship. Appears in "Sad Sack Wasp Trap" and "I Went to Market".
- Tatsuya, played by Jake Choi (season 1), Lawrence's boyfriend and business associate. Appears in "Shit Show at the Fuck Factory" and "Which Side Are You On?"
- Jeane, played by Peggy J. Scott (season 1), Logan's secretary. She is later replaced by Kerry. First appears in "Sad Sack Wasp Trap".
- Amir, played by Darius Homayoun (season 1), Marcia's son who announces at Thanksgiving dinner that he has been hired to head Waystar RoyCo's animation division in Europe. Appears in "I Went to Market" and "Nobody is Ever Missing".
- Steve Cox, played by Wayne Pyle (seasons 2–4), a PGN anchor. First appears in "Vaulter".
- Mark Rosenstock, played by Brian Hotaling (seasons 2–4), a senior Waystar executive alongside Karl, Frank, Hugo and Ray. First appears in "Hunting".
- Pam Thompson, played by Lori Wilner (season 4), an ATN senior producer working under Tom. Appears in "America Decides".
- Sally-Anne, played by Nicole Ansari-Cox (season 4), a woman with whom Logan had a passionate affair while married to Caroline. Ansari-Cox is the real-life wife of Brian Cox (Logan). She appears in "Church and State".
