= Golden Globe Award for Best Actor – Television Series Drama =

Award presented annually by the Hollywood Foreign Press Association

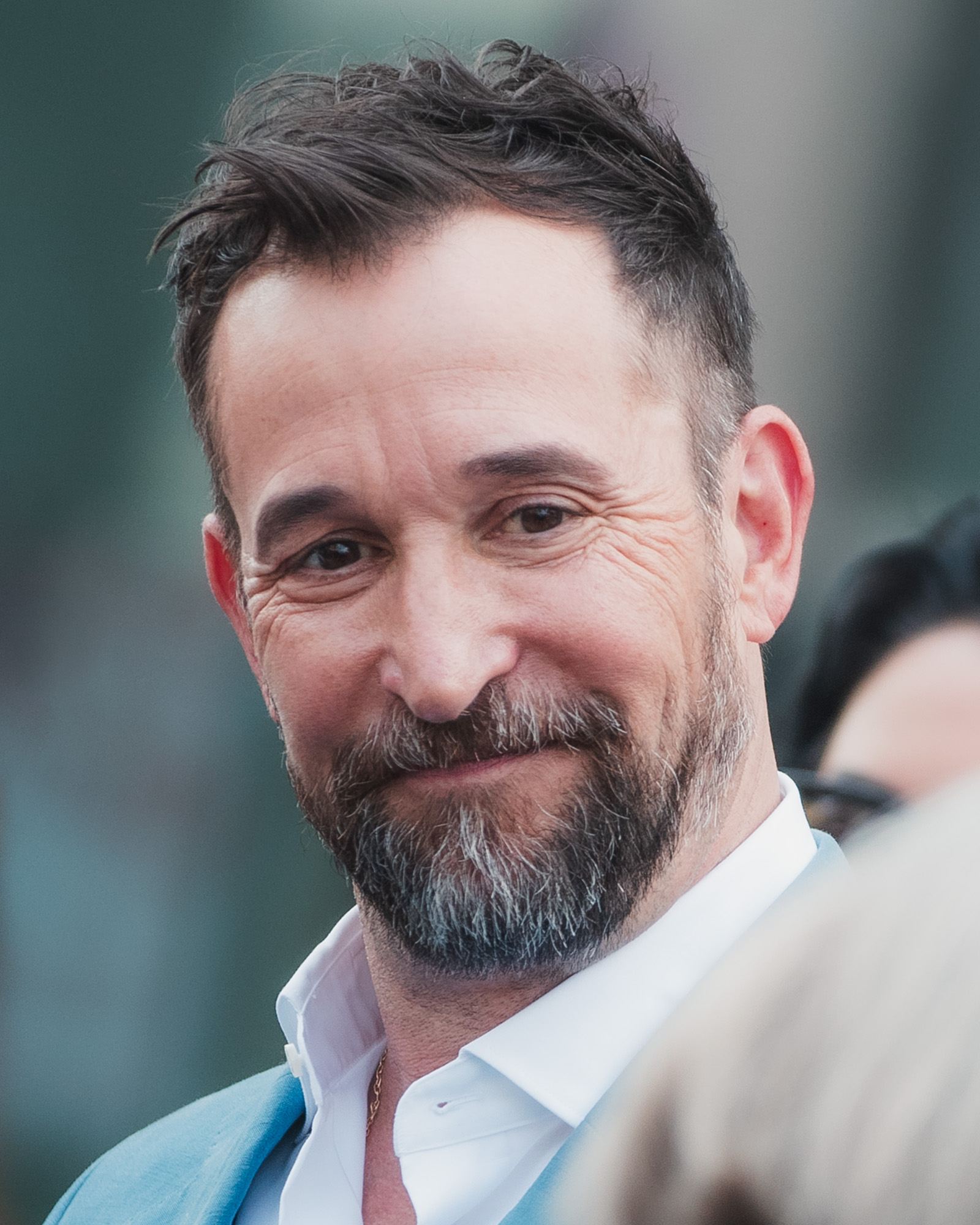
- The 2025 recipient: Noah Wyle
- Awarded for: Best Performance by an Actor in a Television Series – Drama
- Country: United States
- Presented by: Hollywood Foreign Press Association
- First award: March 5, 1962
- Currently held by: Noah Wyle, The Pitt (2025)

Highlights
- Most awards: Ed Asner / John Forsythe / Jon Hamm / Hugh Laurie / Telly Savalas (all 2 each)
- Most nominations: Peter Falk / Tom Selleck (7)
- Website: goldenglobes.org

The Golden Globe Award for Best Actor – Television Series Drama is an award presented annually by the Hollywood Foreign Press Association (HFPA). This Golden Globe Award honors the best performance by an actor in a drama television series.

It was first awarded at the 19th Golden Globe Awards on March 5, 1962 to John Charles Daly and Bob Newhart under the title "Best TV Star – Male". In 1969, the award was presented under the new title "Best TV Actor – Drama"; its current title has been used since 1980. The nominees for the award have been announced annually since 1963.

Noah Wyle is the current recipient of the award for his portrayal of Michael Robinavitch in The Pitt. Ed Asner, John Forsythe, Jon Hamm, Hugh Laurie and Telly Savalas have won the most awards in this category, each winning twice. Peter Falk and Tom Selleck have both been nominated seven times each, for their respective roles on Columbo and Magnum, P.I..

== Winners and nominees ==
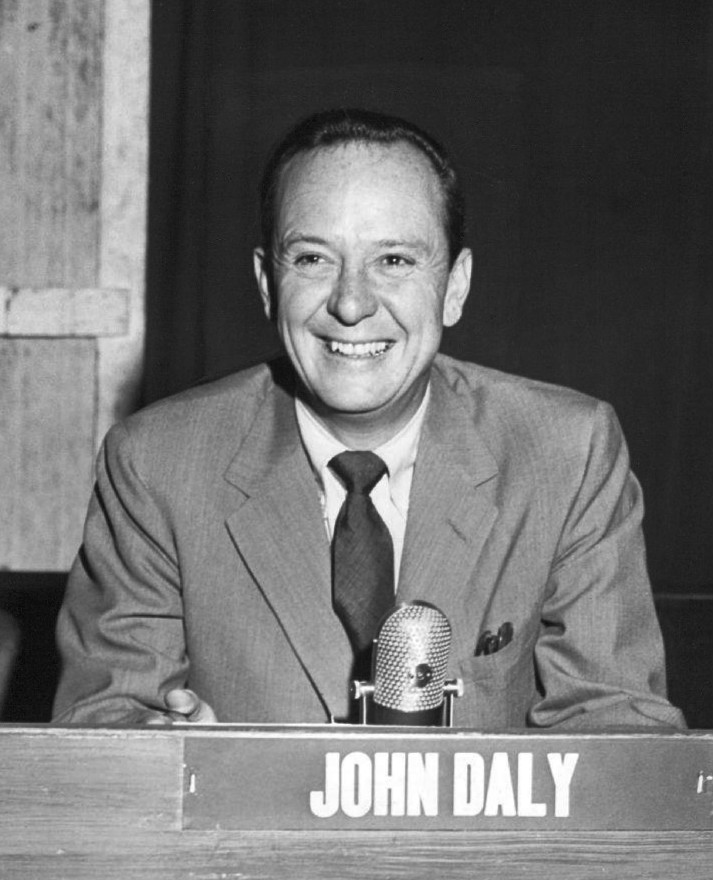
John Charles Daly won the first recipient of this award with Bob Newhart in 1961

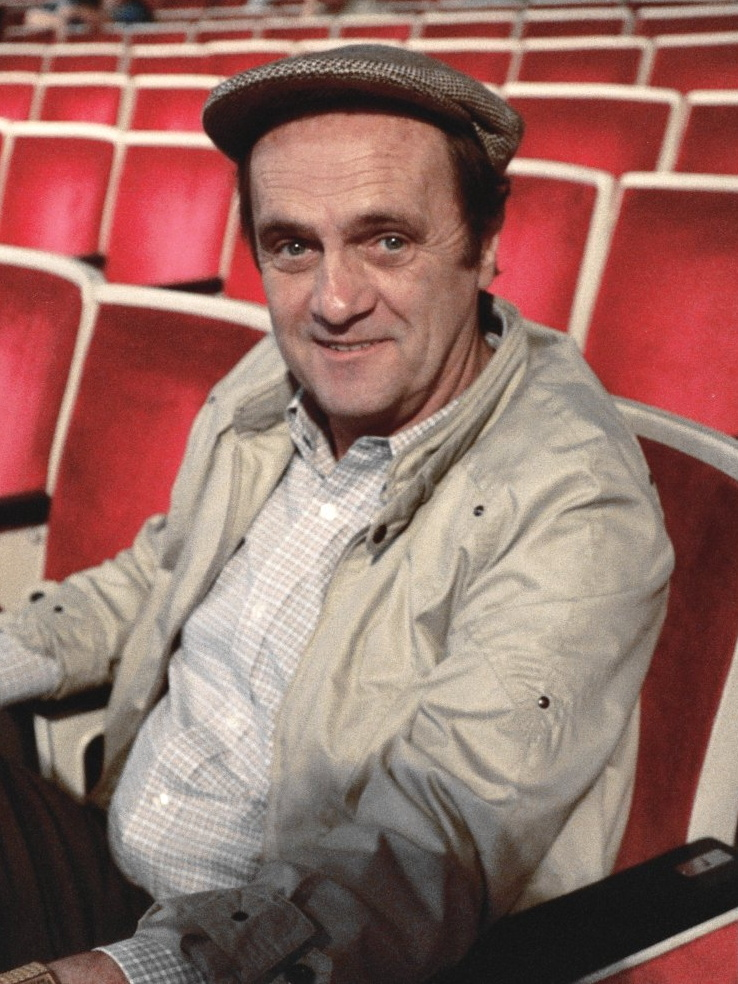
Bob Newhart tied with John Charles Daly to be the first recipient of the award.

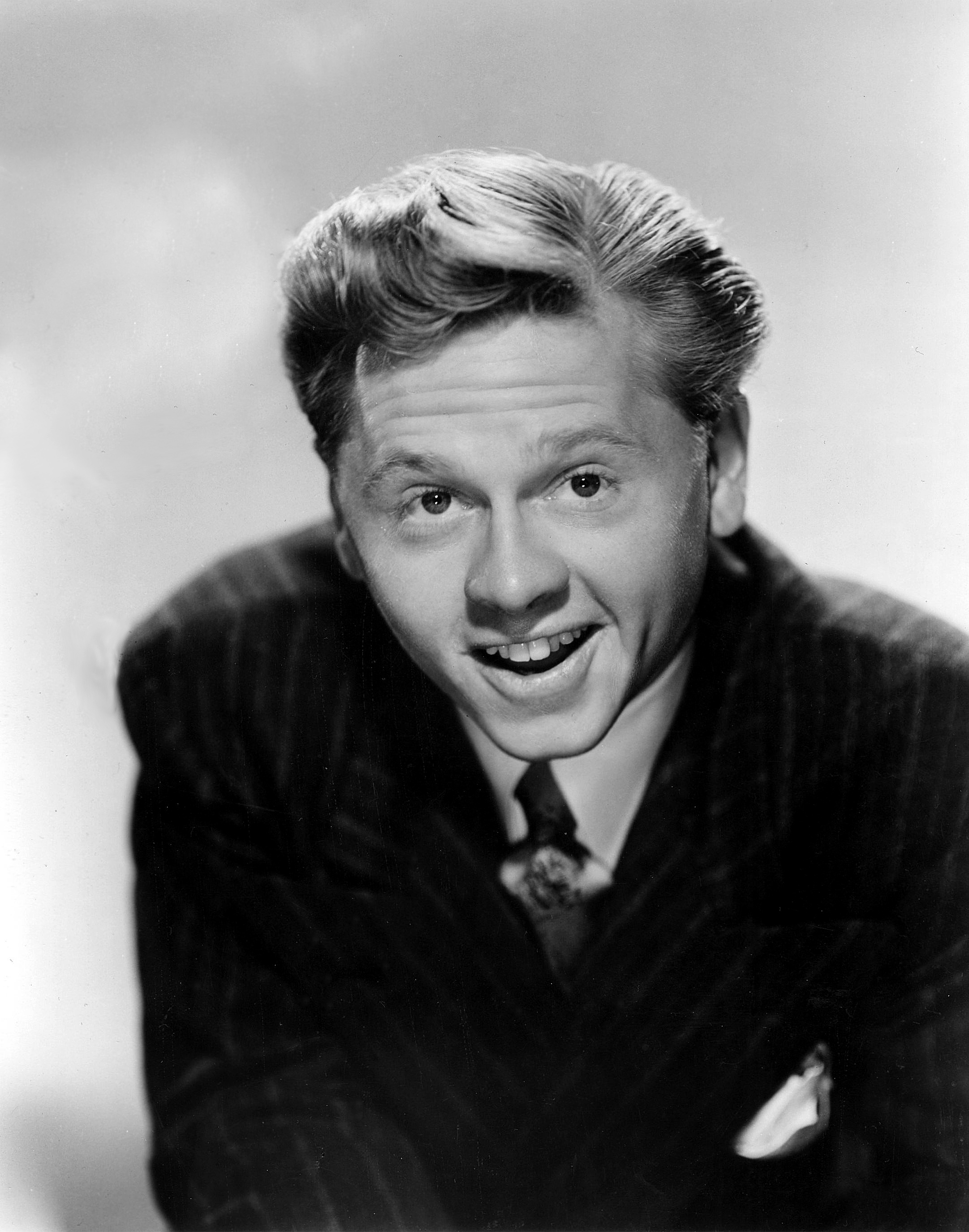
Mickey Rooney won for Mickey in 1963

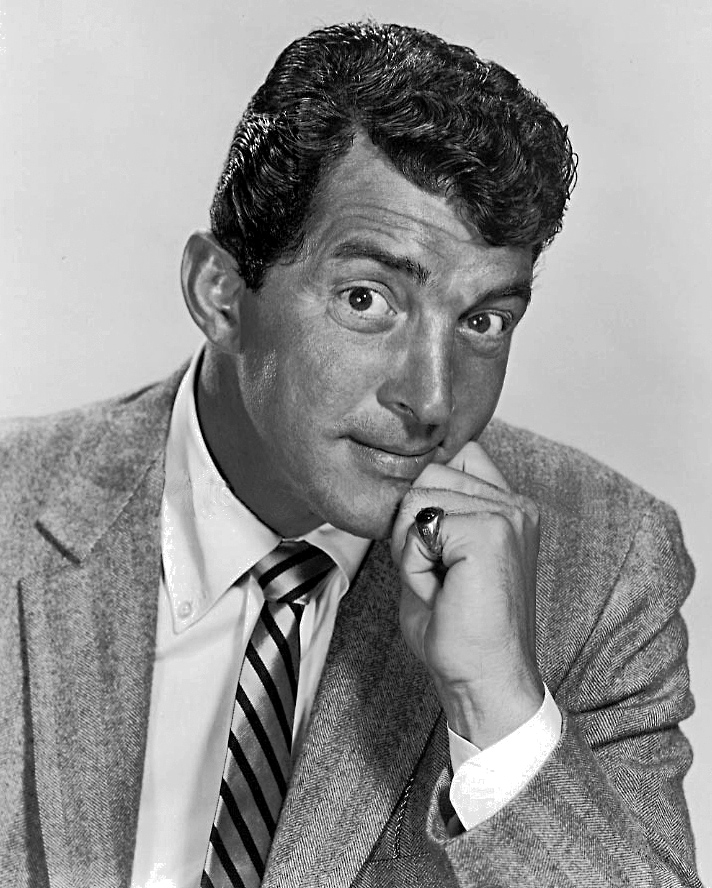
Dean Martin won the award in 1966 for The Dean Martin Show.

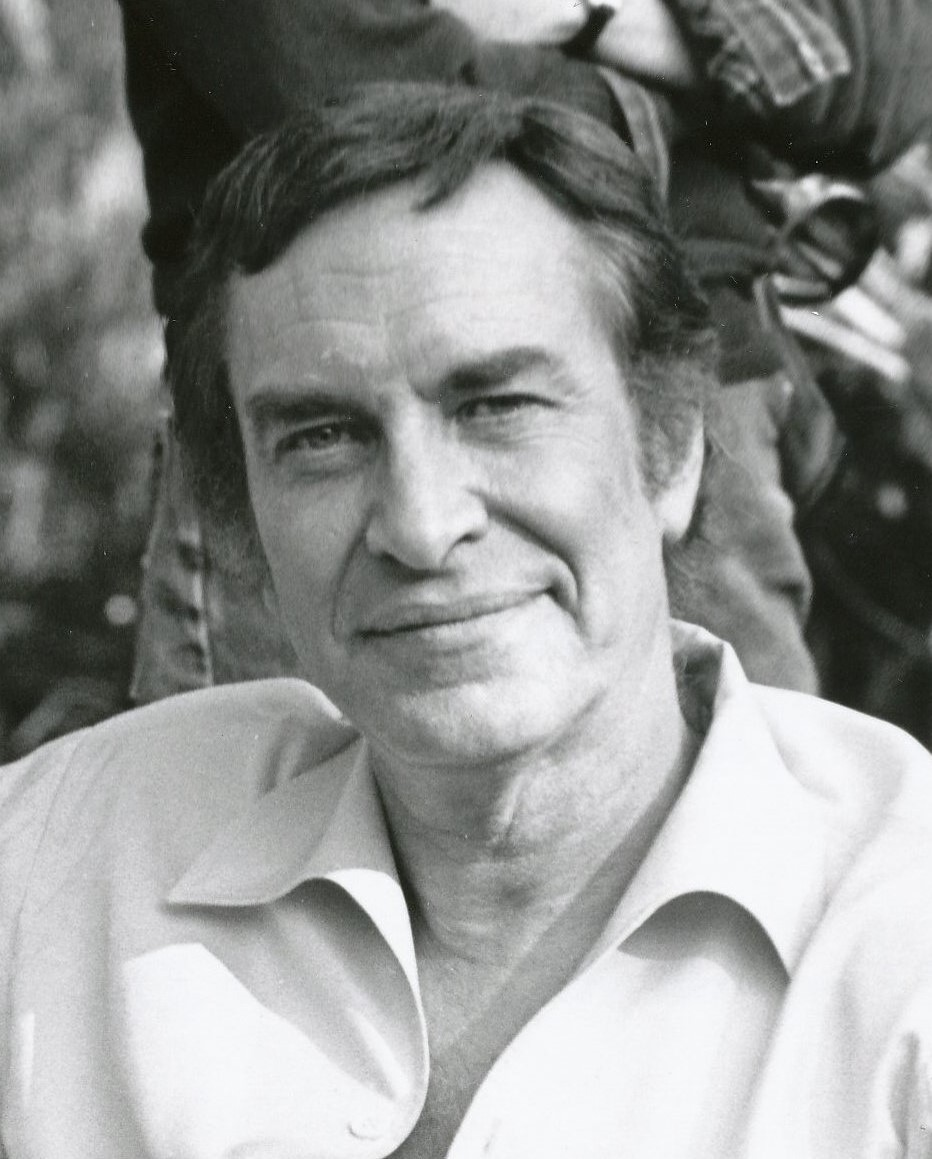
Martin Landau won for Mission: Impossible in 1967

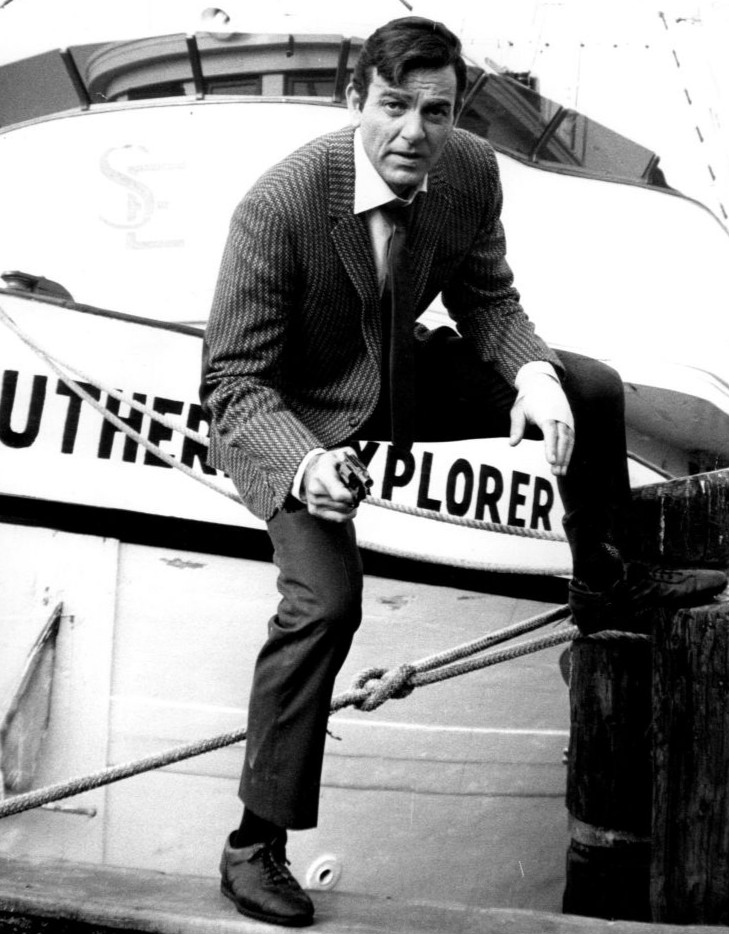
Mike Connors won in 1970 and received five more nominations for his performance on Mannix as Joe Mannix.

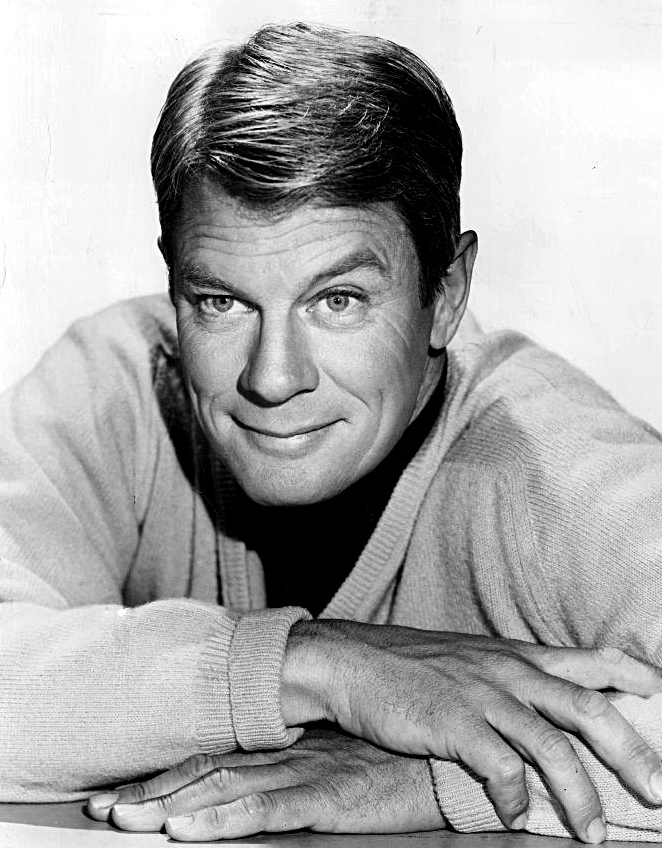
Peter Graves won in 1971 playing Jim Phelps on Mission: Impossible.

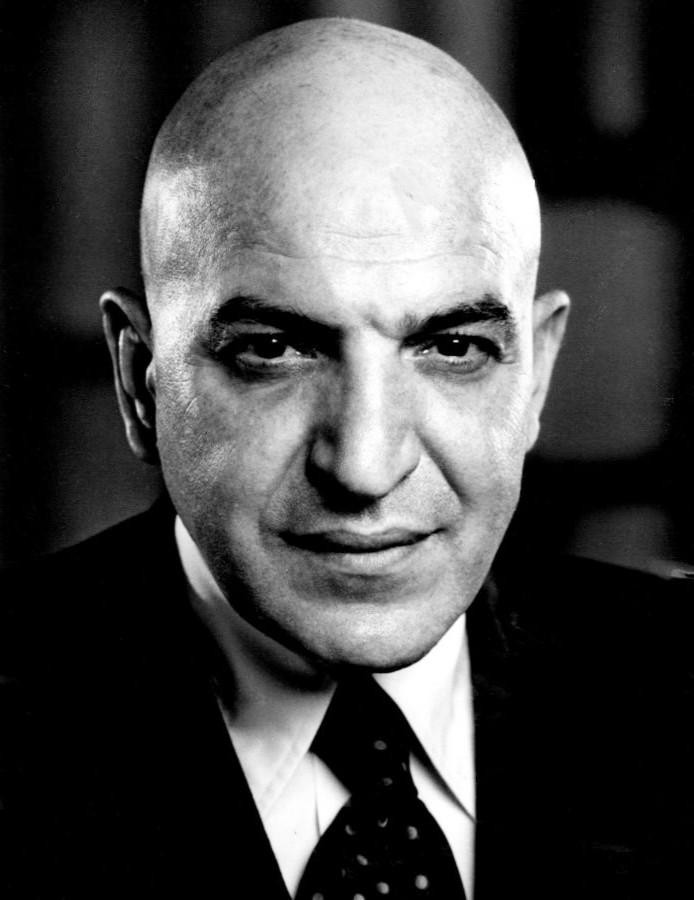
Telly Savalas won the award twice for Kojak

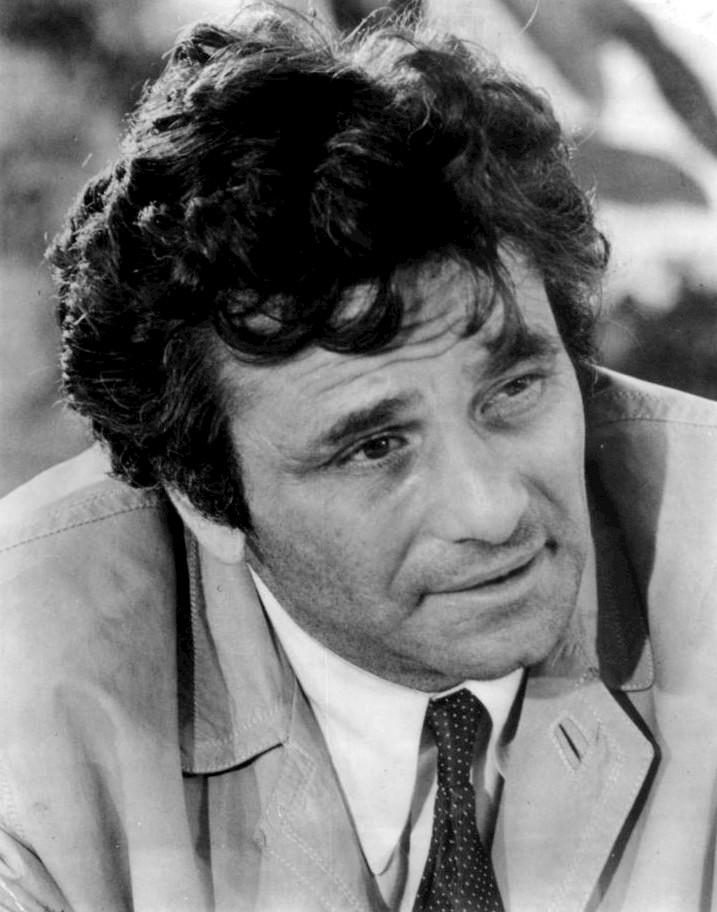
Peter Falk won for Columbo in 1972 (out of seven nominations).

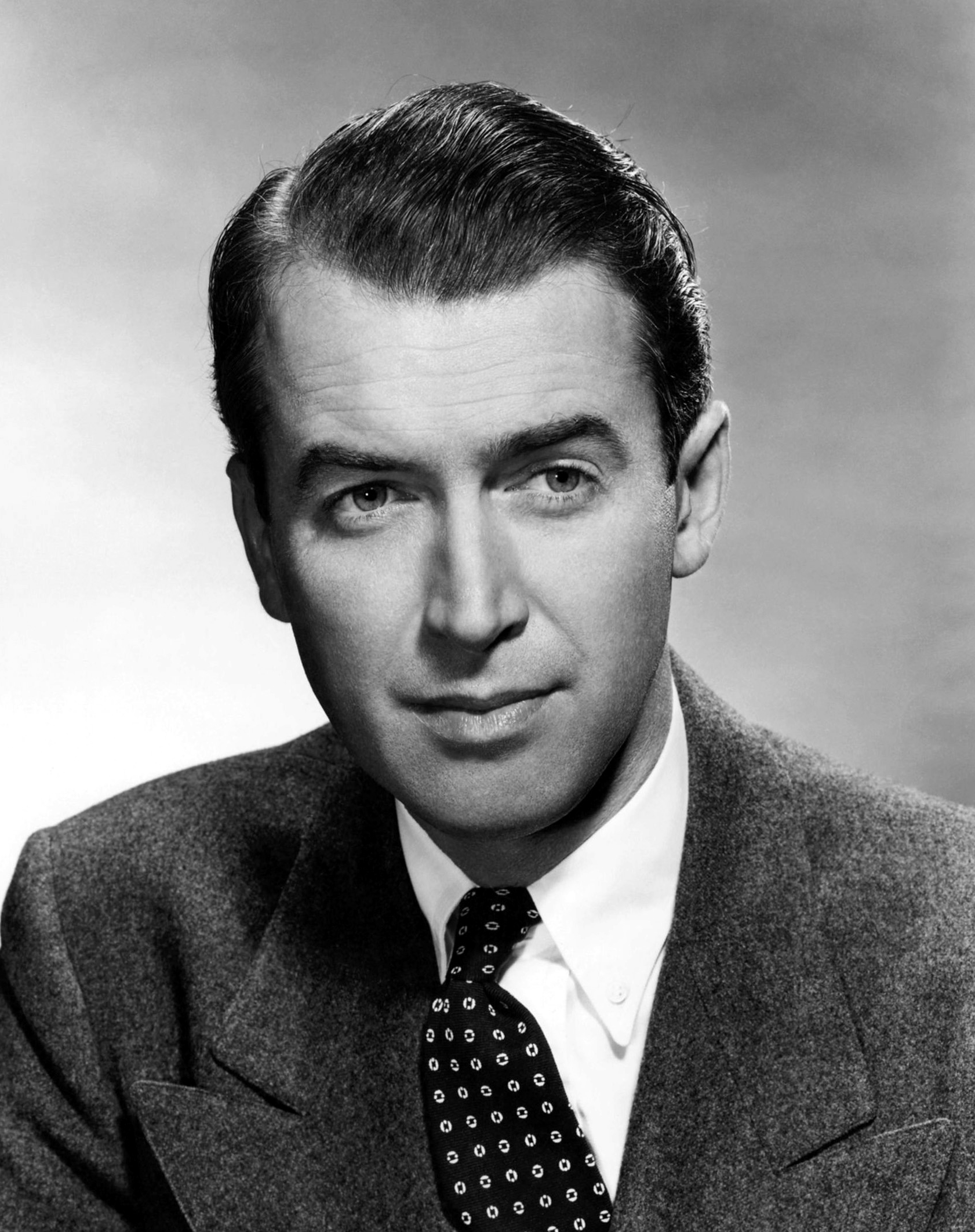
James Stewart won for Hawkins (1972).

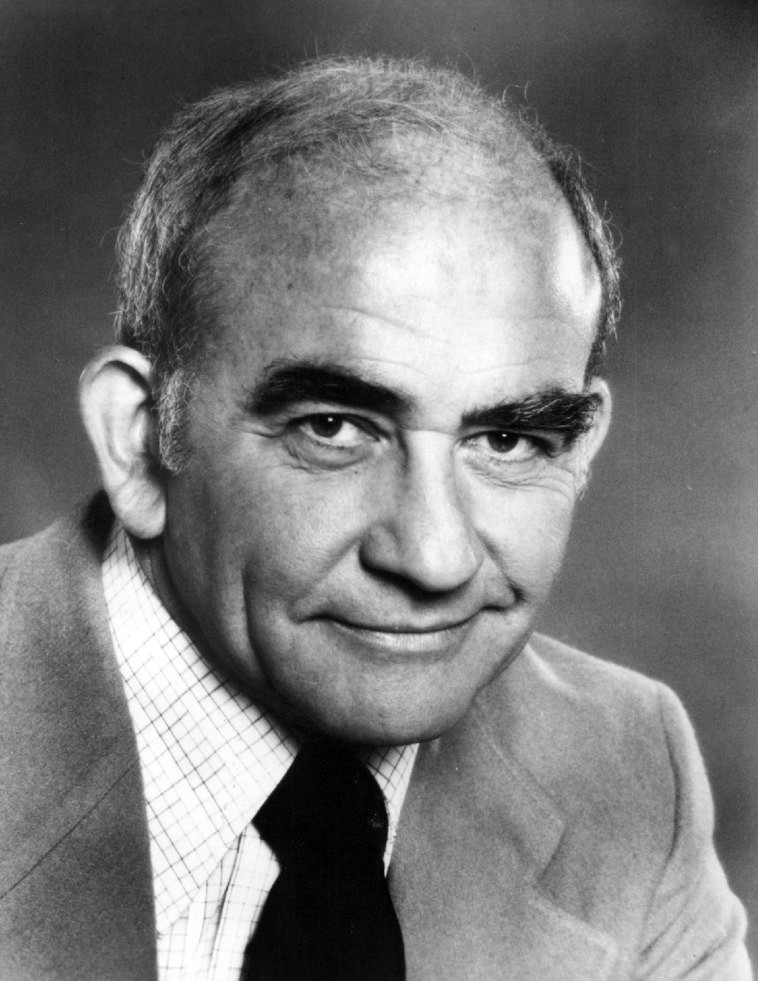
Ed Asner won twice for his role as Lou Grant on the eponymous show.

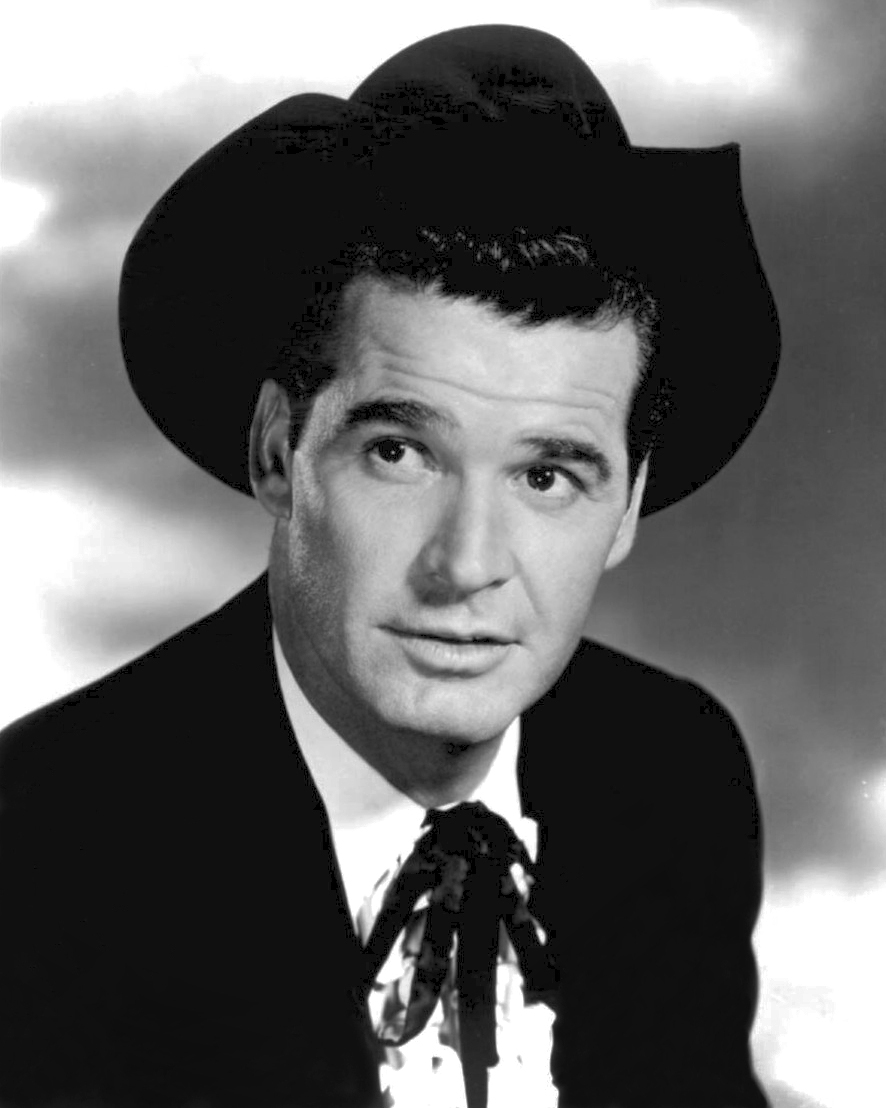
James Garner was nominated three times for his role as Jim Rockford on The Rockford Files.

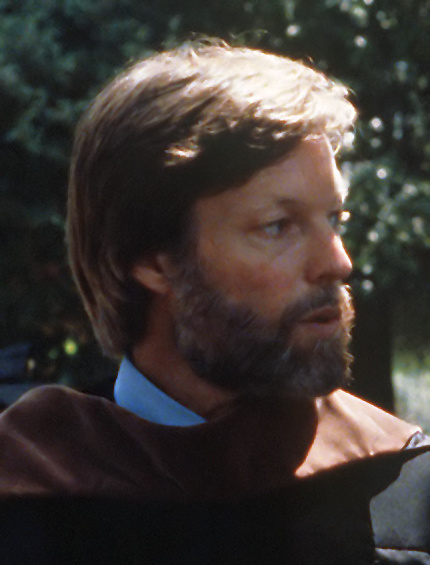
Richard Chamberlain won in 1981 for his role as John Blackthorne on the miniseries Shōgun.

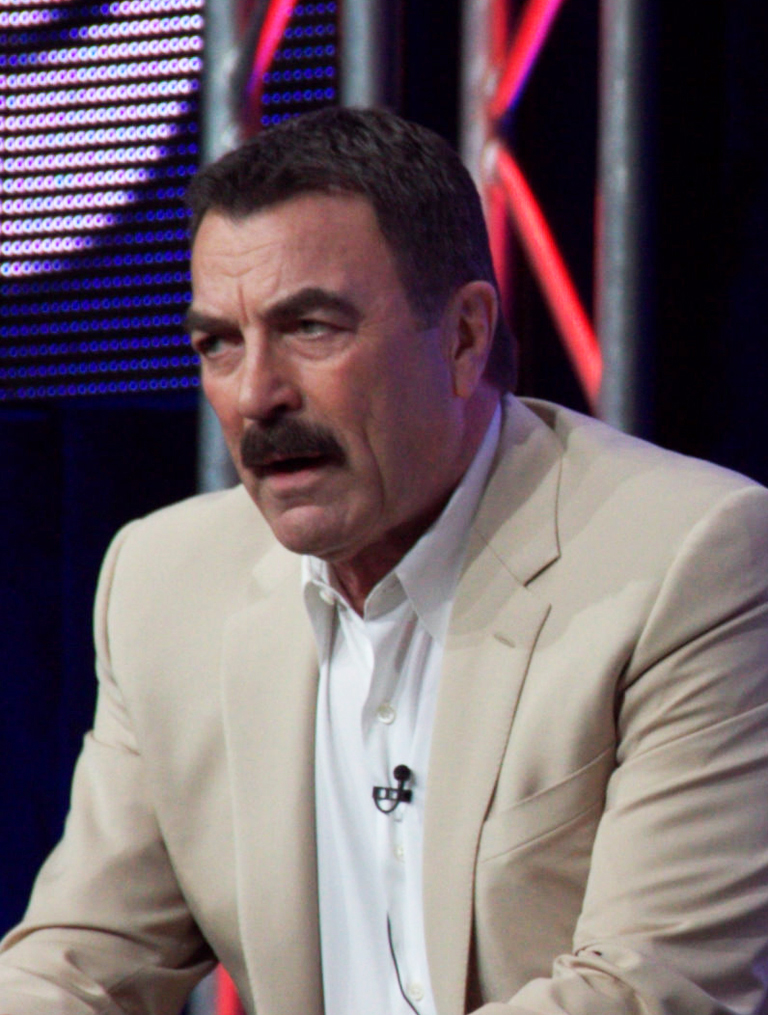
Tom Selleck won for playing the title role in Magnum, P.I.. He tied with Peter Falk for having the most nominations in the category.

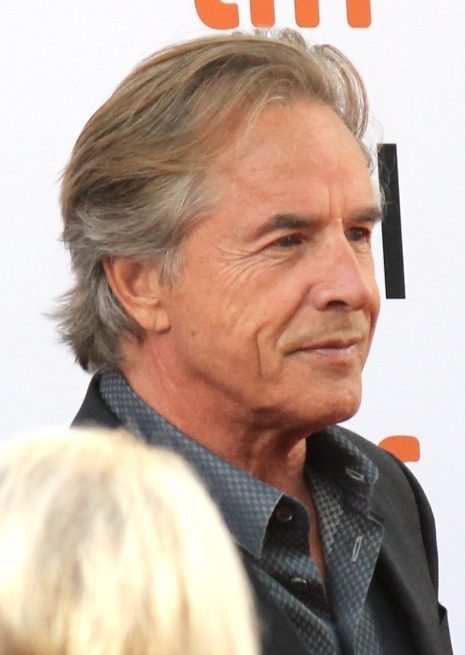
Don Johnson won for Miami Vice (1985)

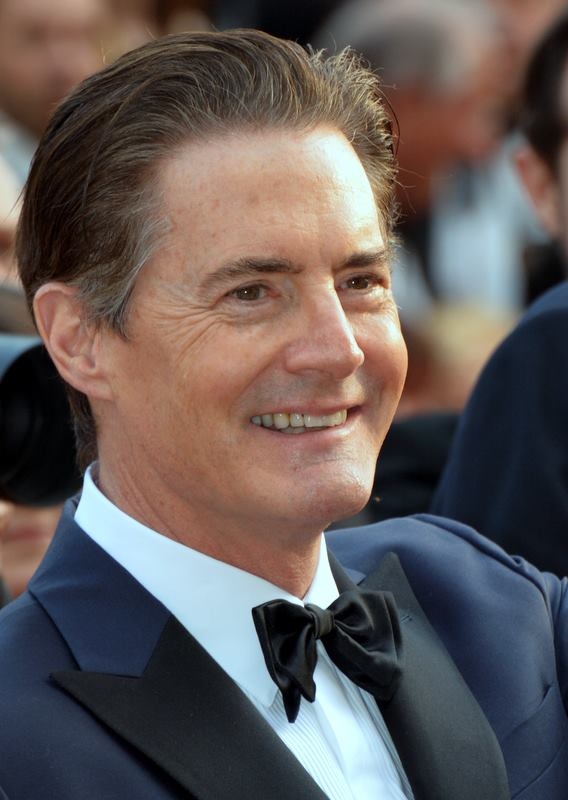
Kyle MacLachlan won in 1991 playing Dale Cooper on Twin Peaks

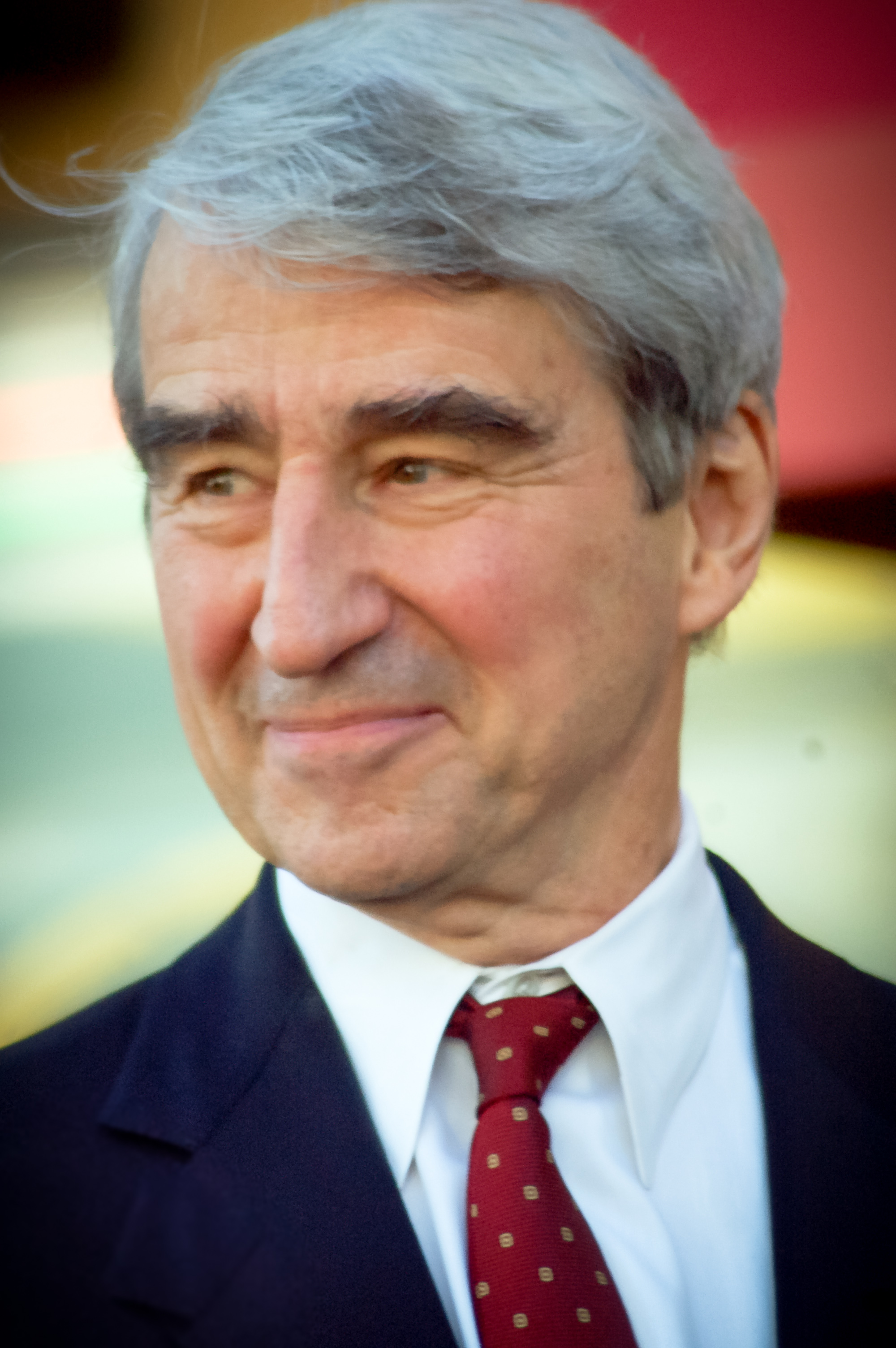
Sam Waterston won for I'll Fly Away (1992)

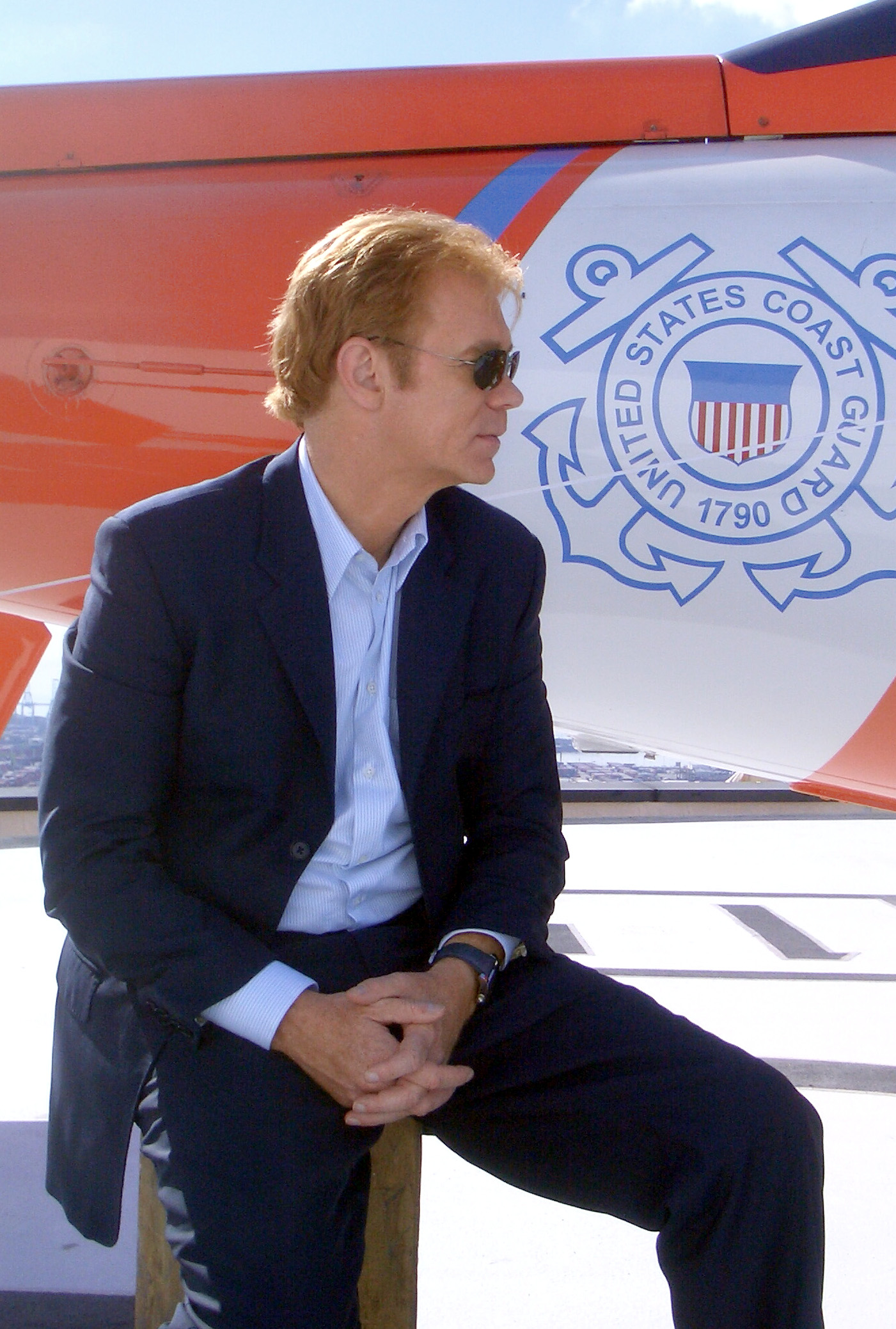
David Caruso won in 1994 for NYPD Blue

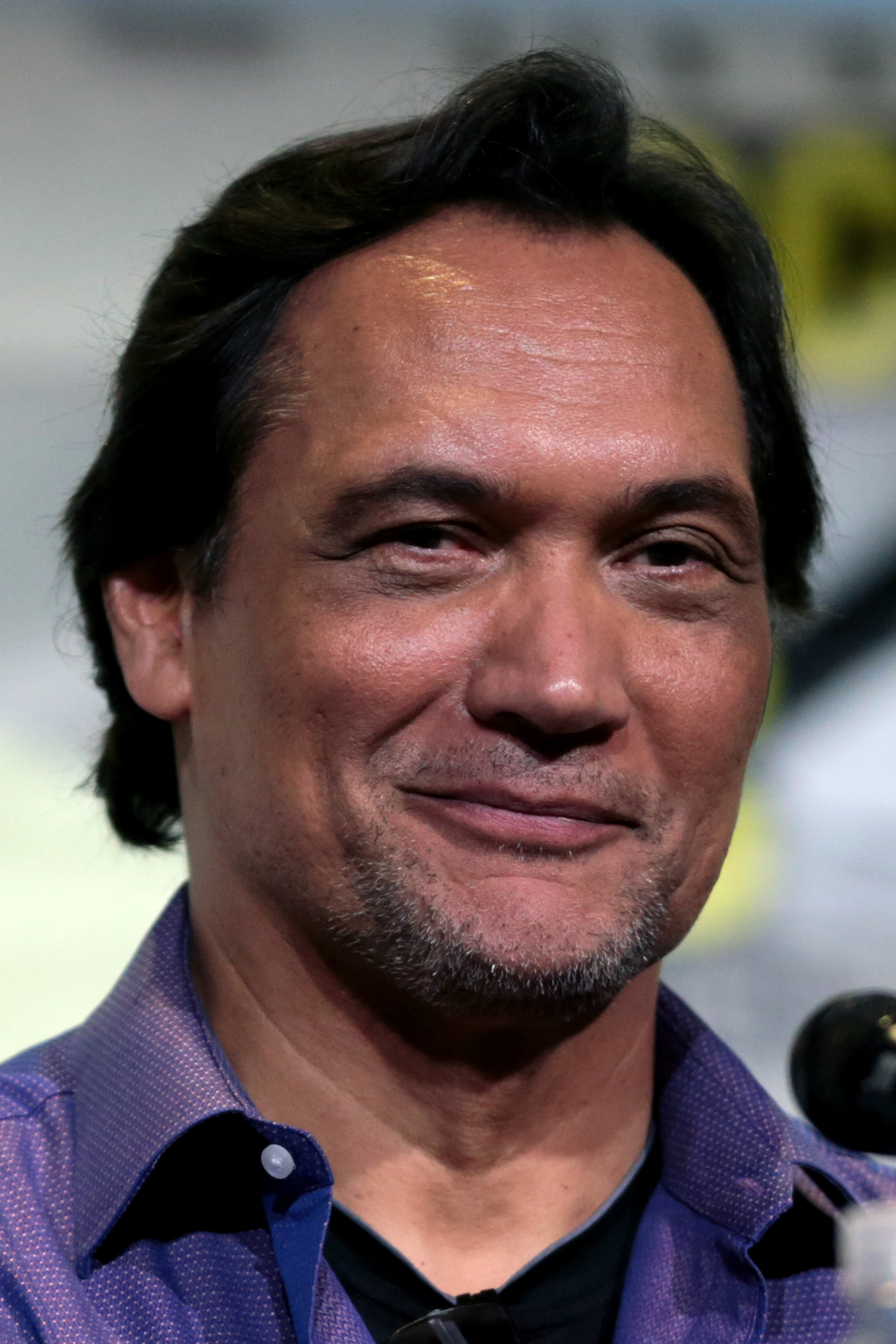
Jimmy Smits received the award for his role in NYPD Blue

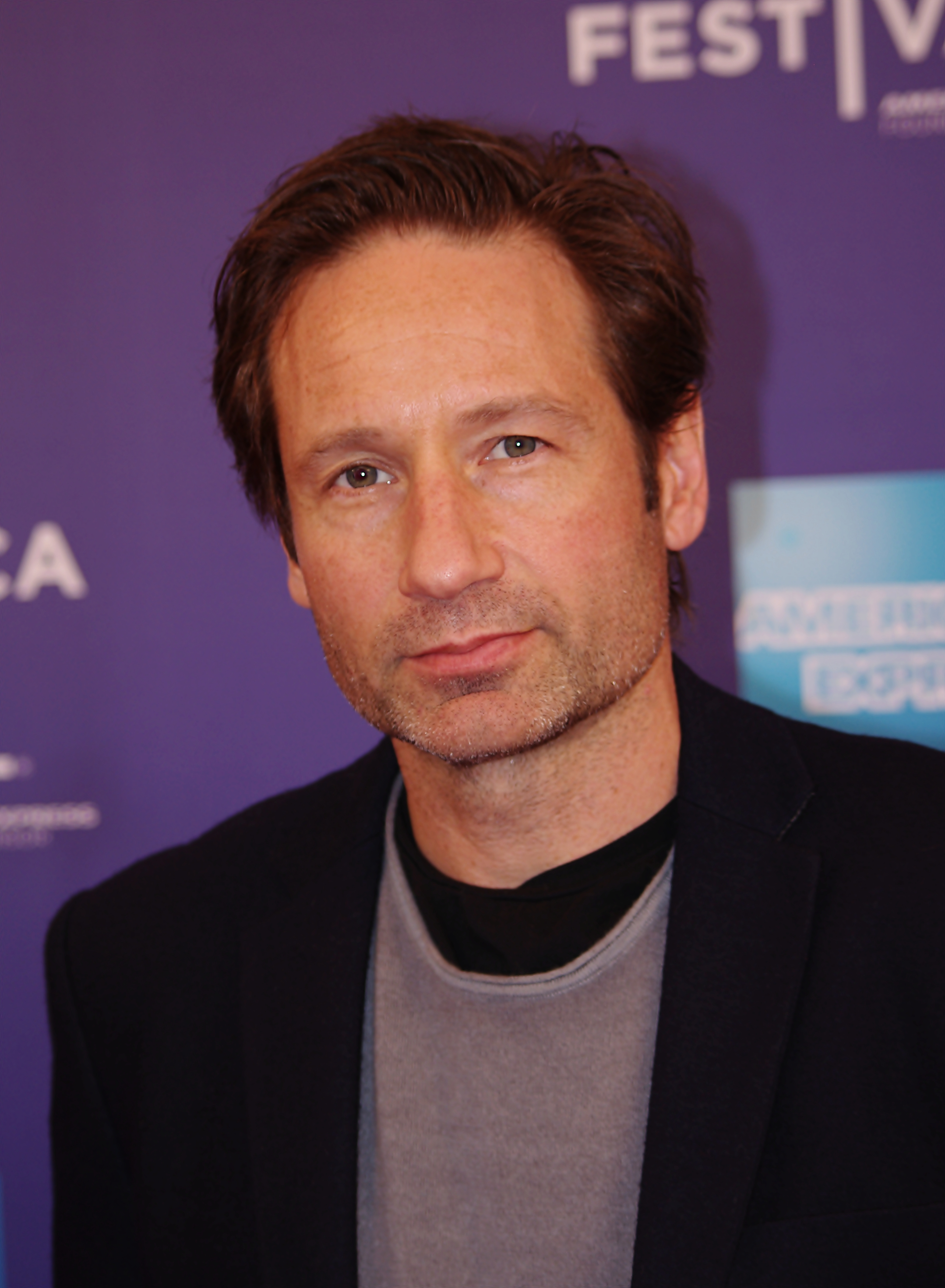
David Duchovny won for The X-Files

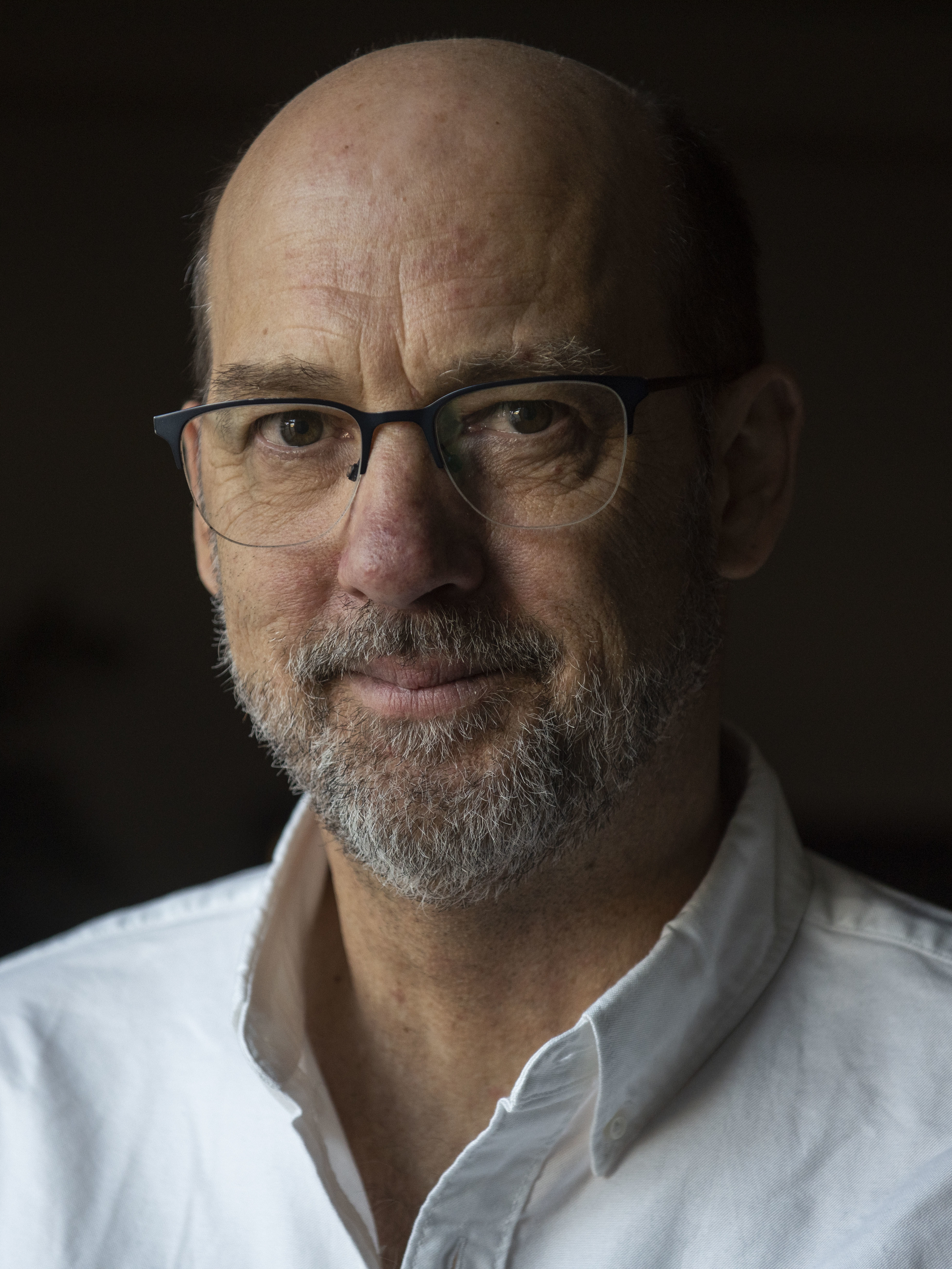
Anthony Edwards won for ER

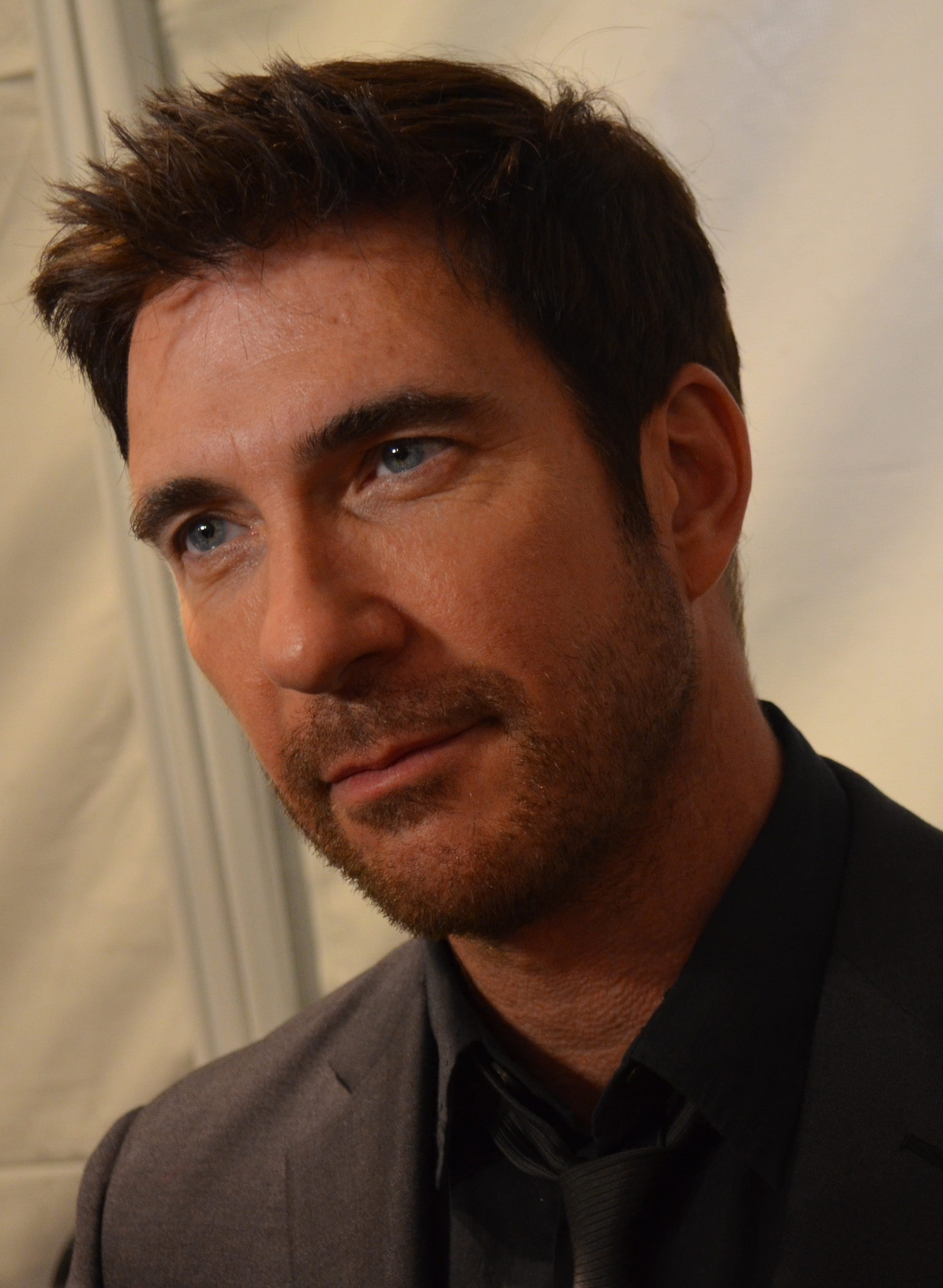
Dylan McDermott won for The Practice (1998).

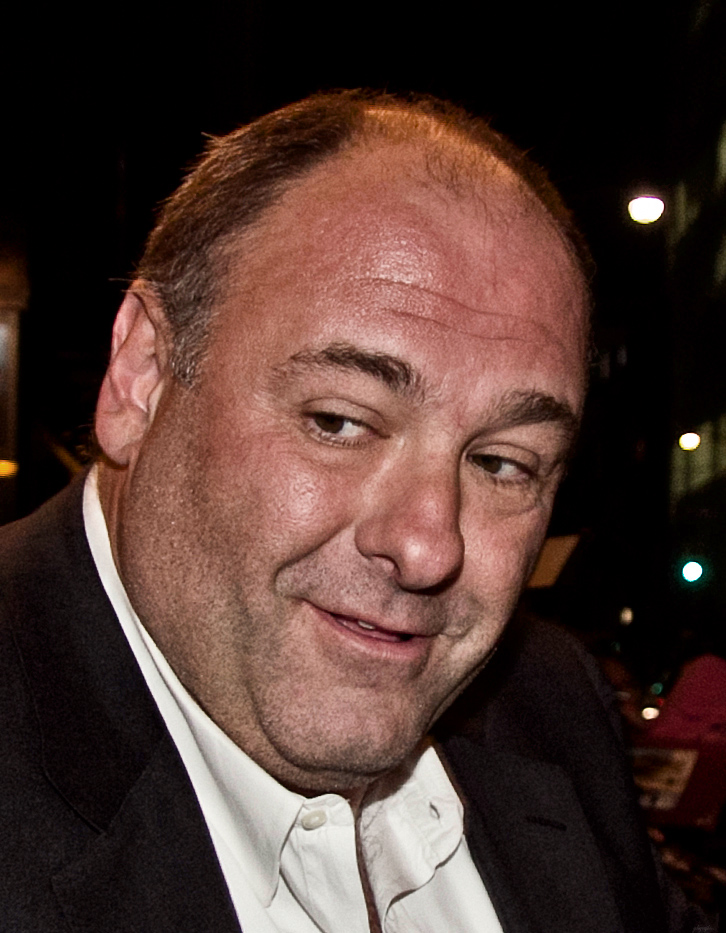
James Gandolfini won in 2000 for playing Tony Soprano in The Sopranos

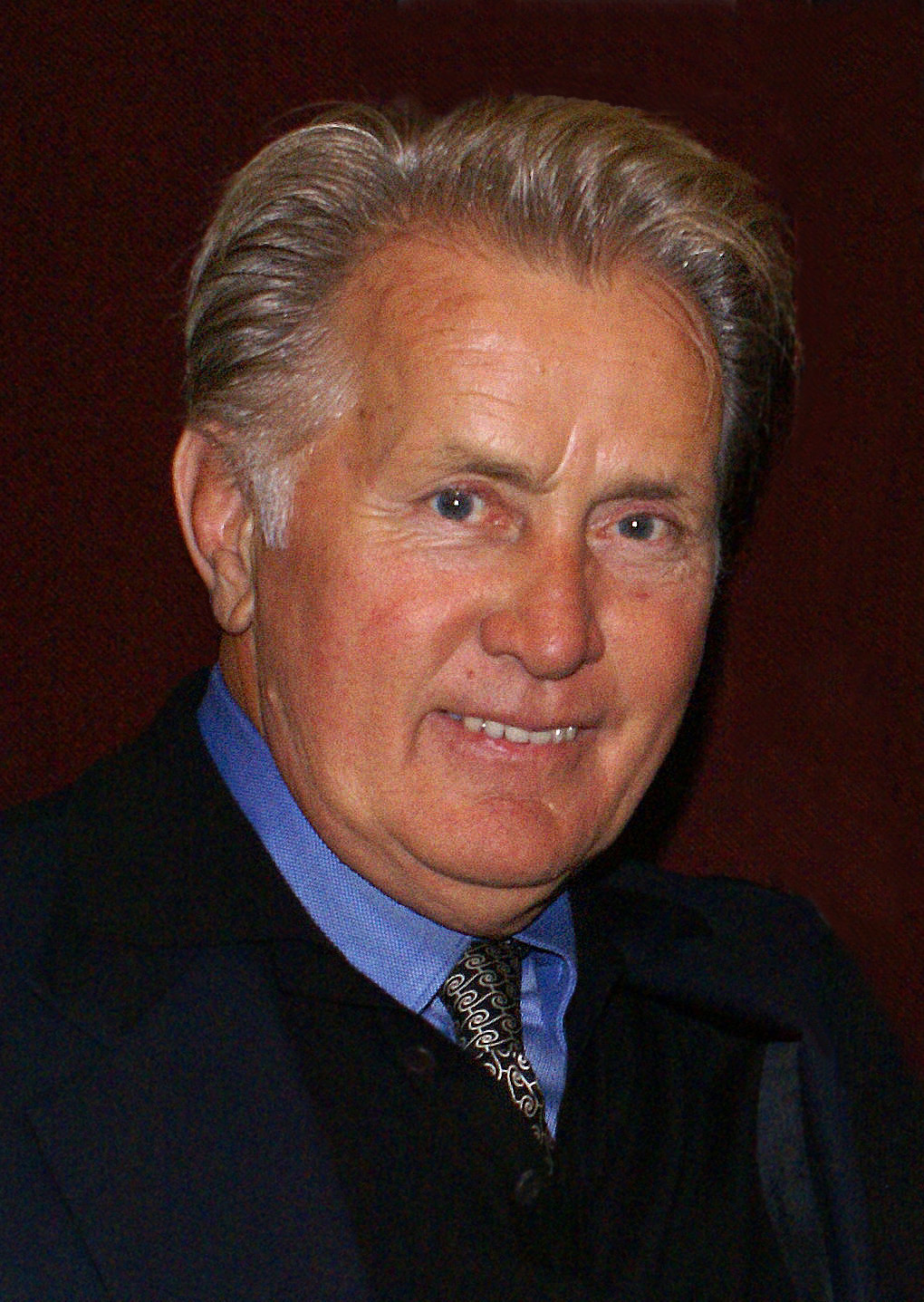
Martin Sheen won for Josiah Bartlet on The West Wing (2004)

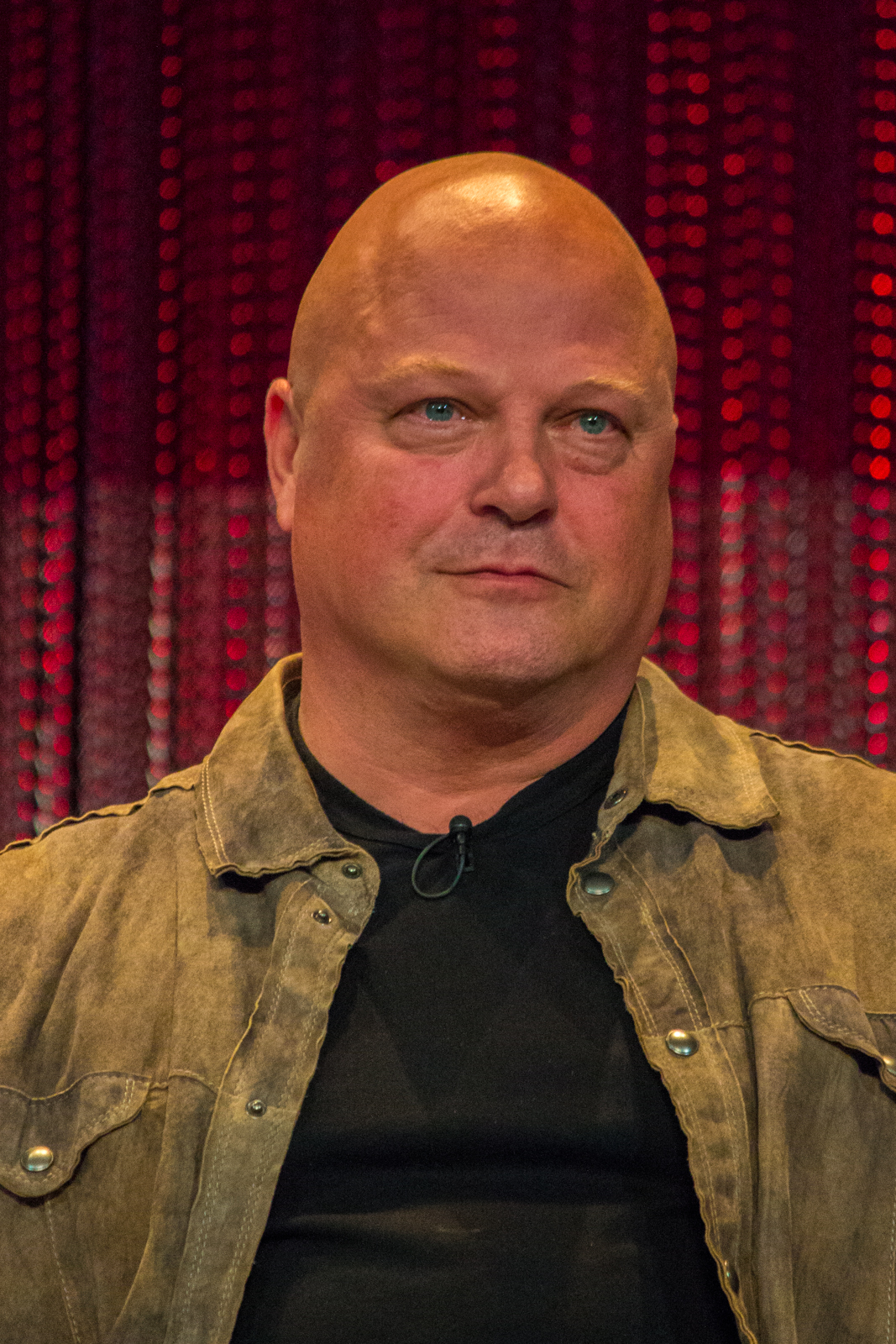
Michael Chiklis won playing Vic Mackey in The Shield (2002)

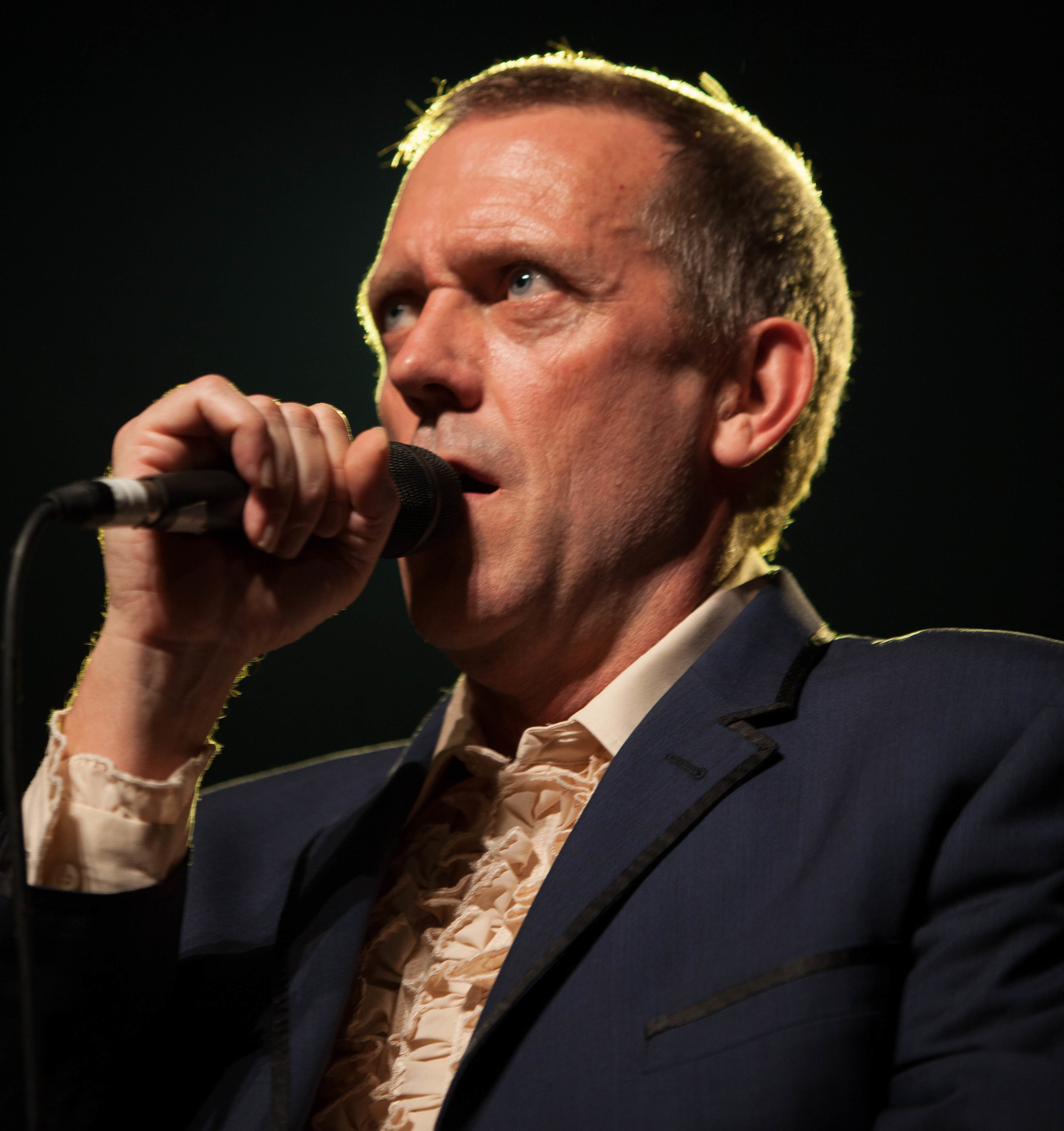
Hugh Laurie won twice for playing Gregory House House (2005, 2006).

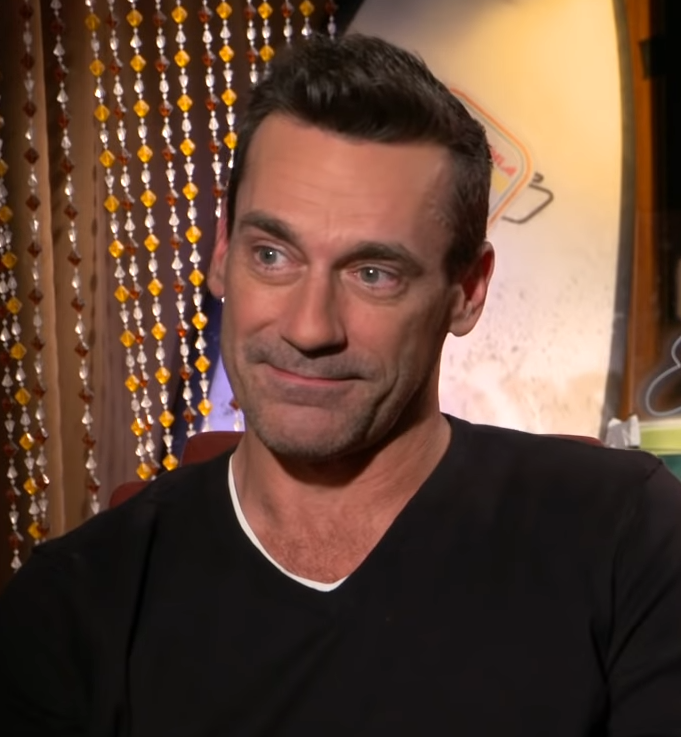
Jon Hamm won in 2008 and 2016 for his role as Don Draper on Mad Men.

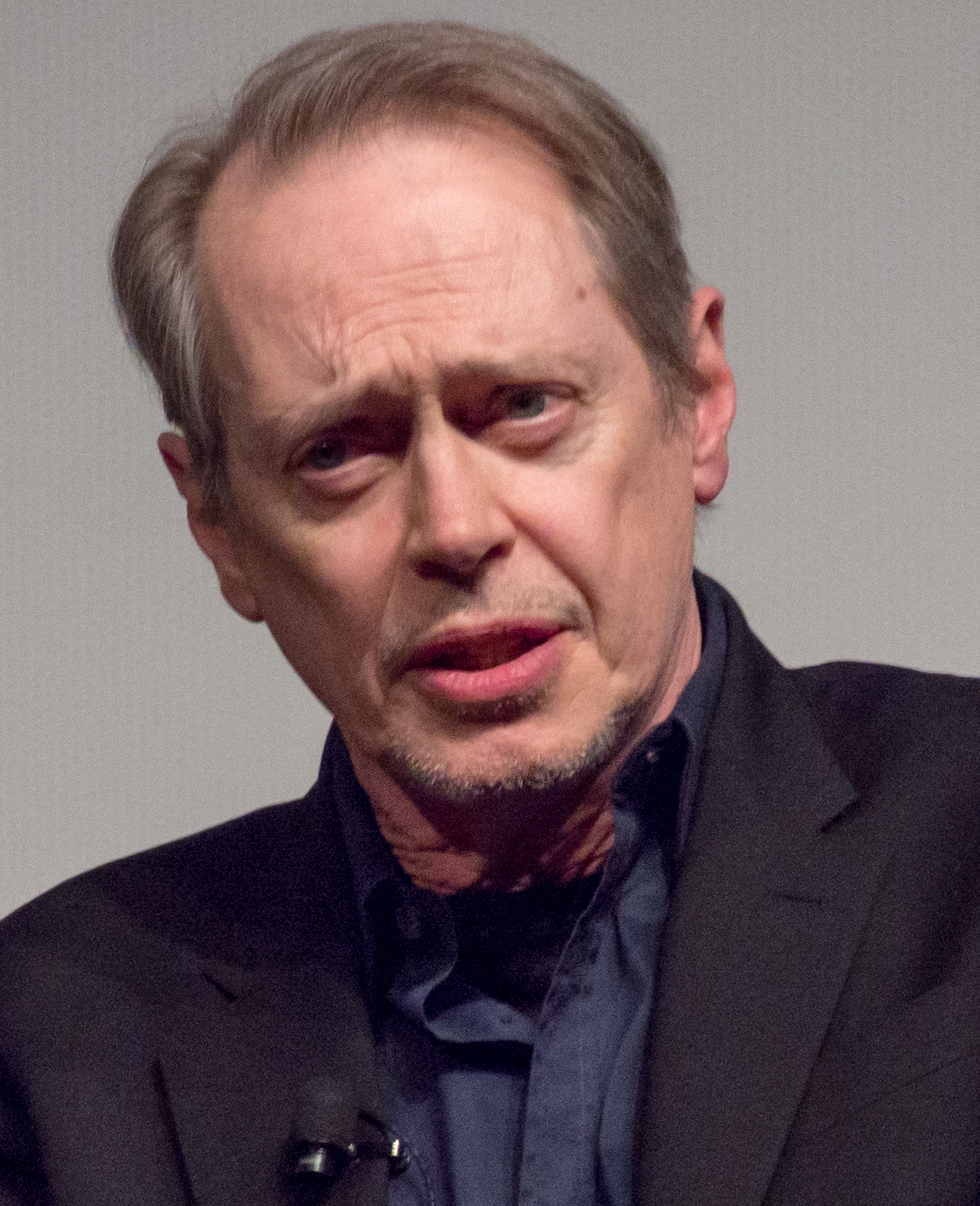
Steve Buscemi won for playing Nucky Thompson Boardwalk Empire (2010)

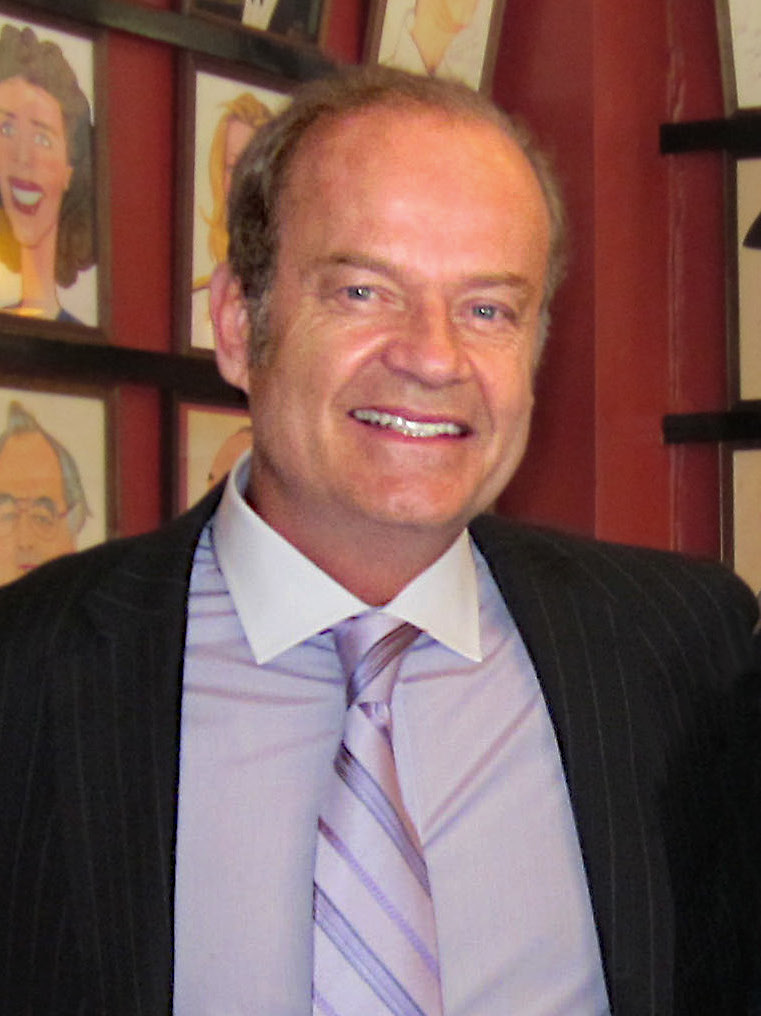
Kelsey Grammer won for playing a corrupt mayor in Boss (2011)

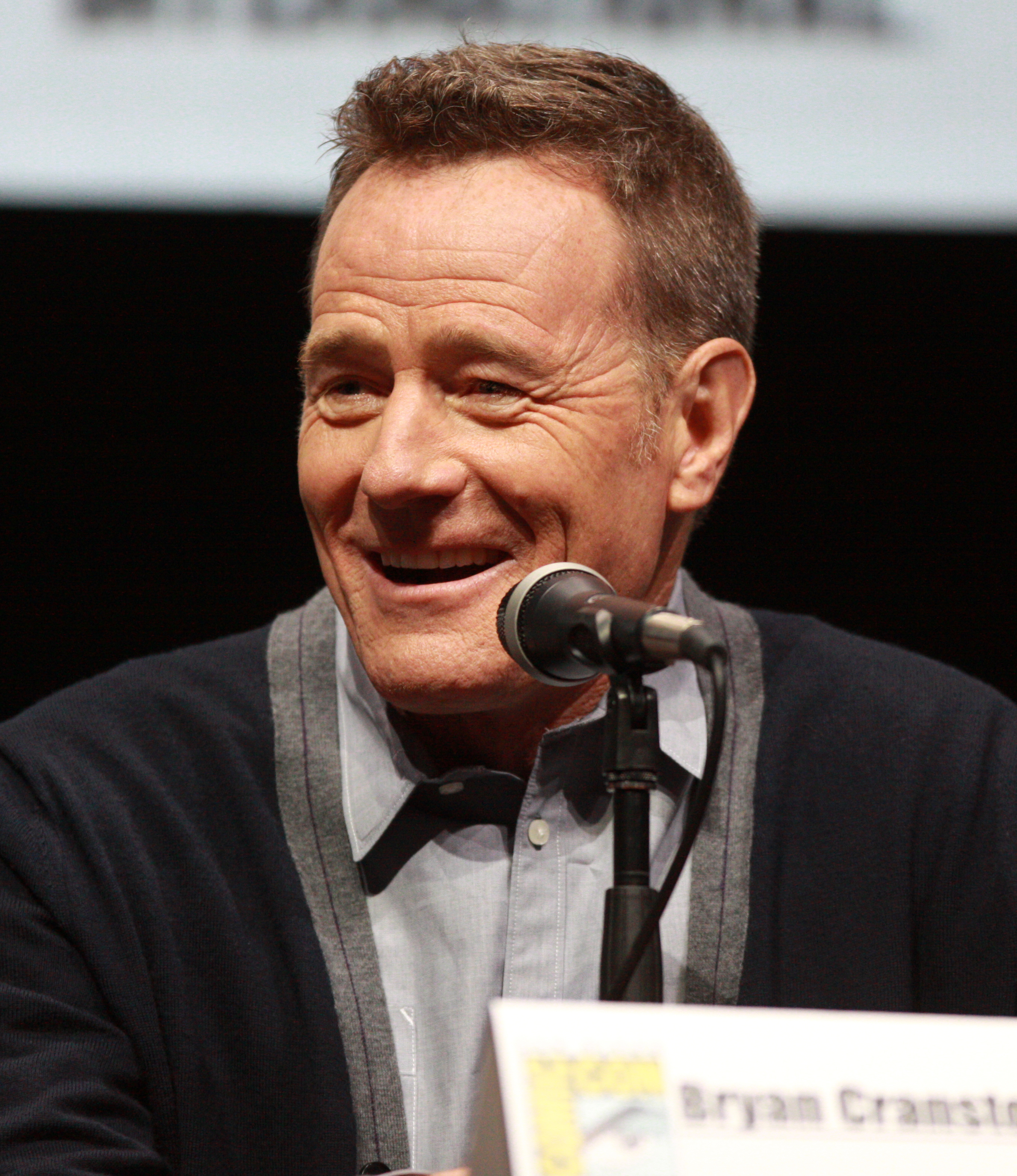
Bryan Cranston won playing Walter White in Breaking Bad (2014)

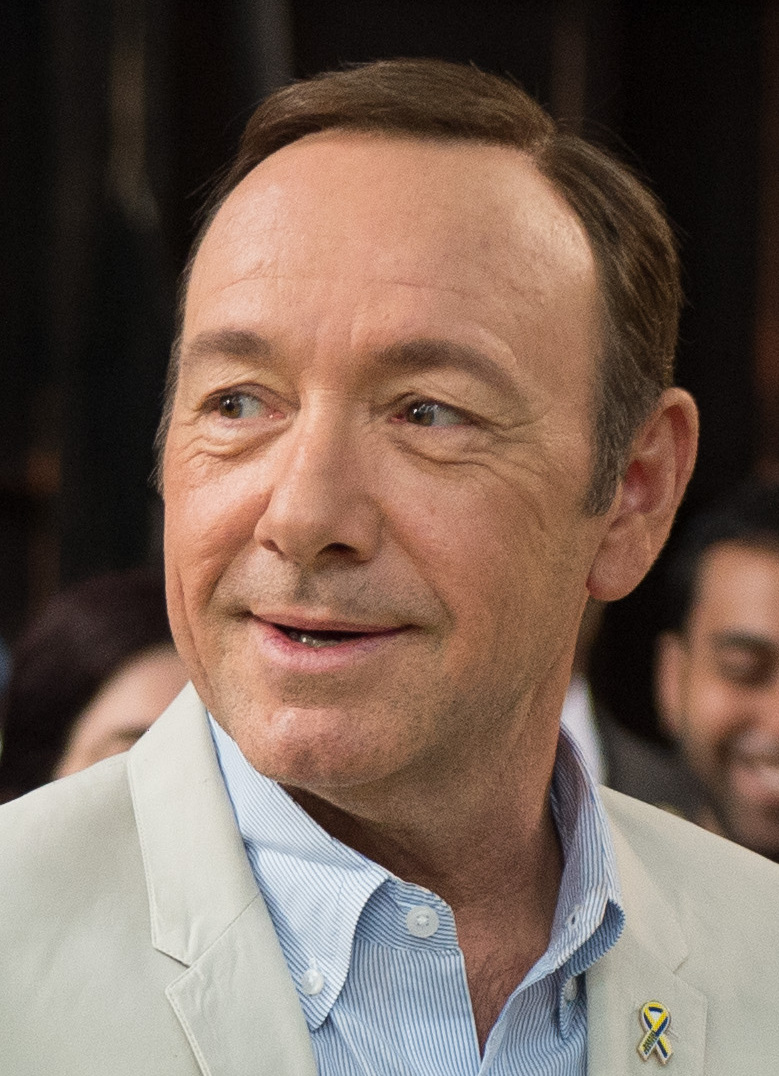
Kevin Spacey won playing Frank Underwood in House of Cards (2014)

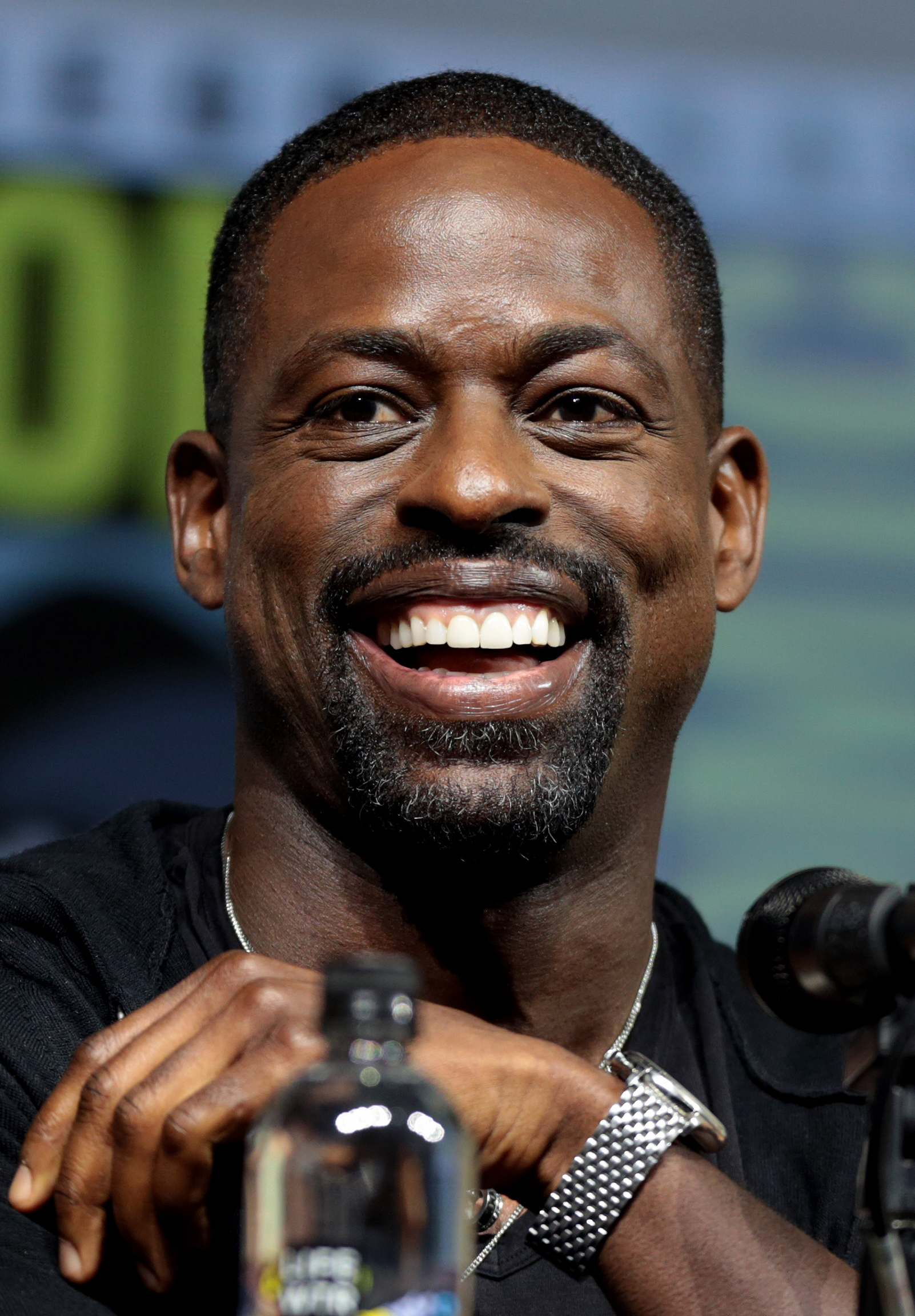
Sterling K. Brown won for This is Us (2017)

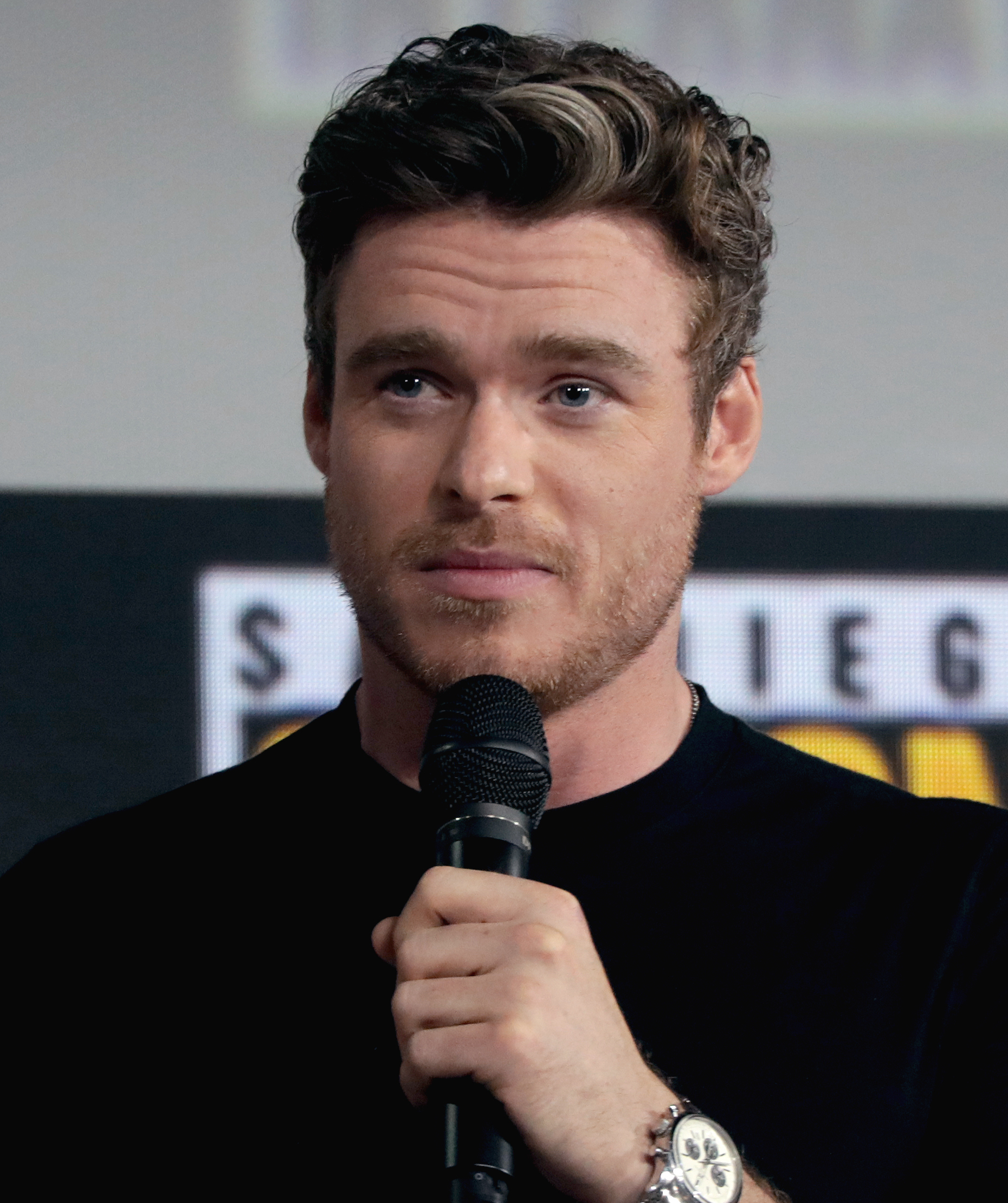
Richard Madden won for Bodyguard (2018)

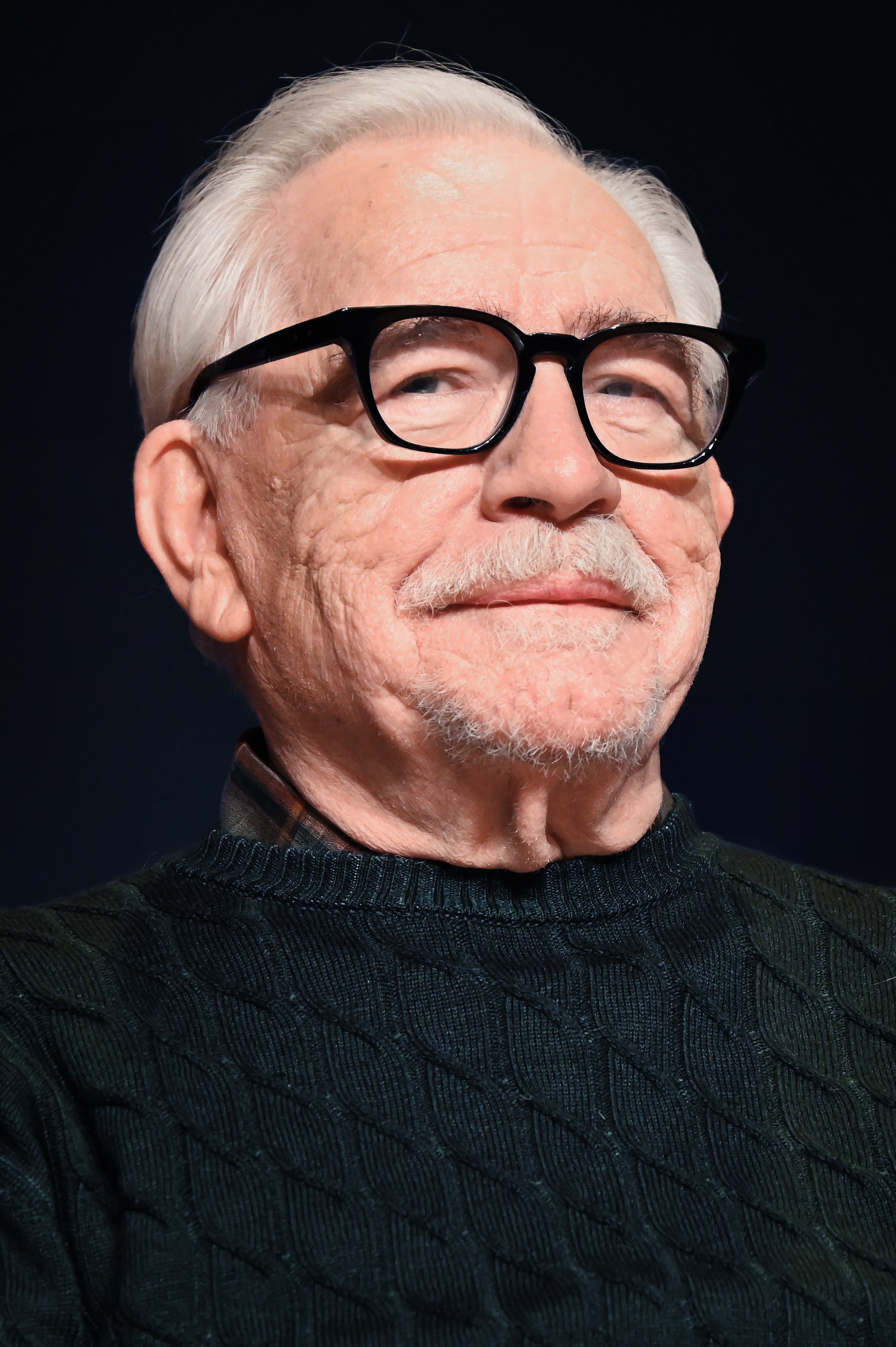
Brian Cox won for Succession (2019)

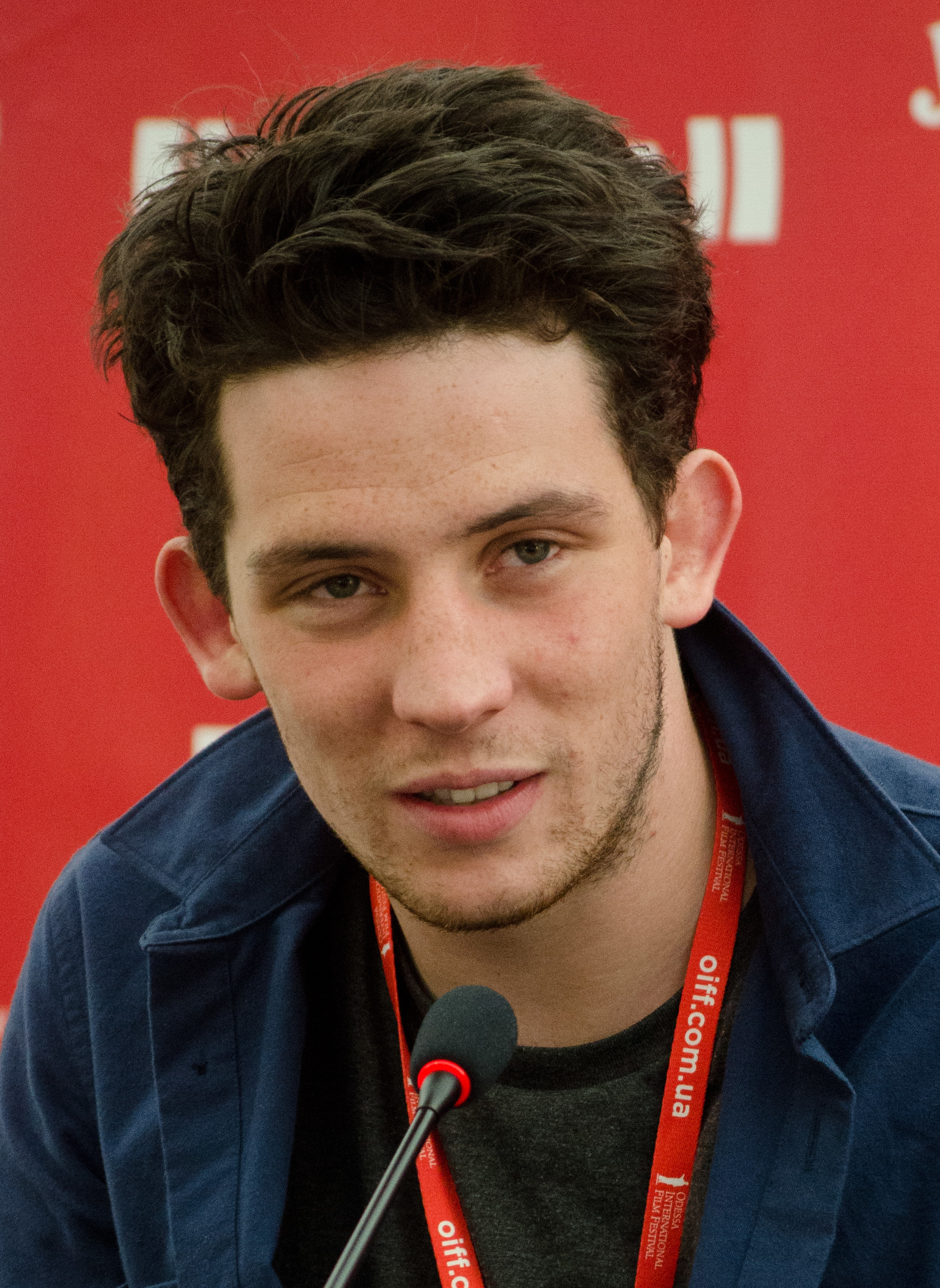
Josh O'Connor won for playing Prince Charles on The Crown (2020)

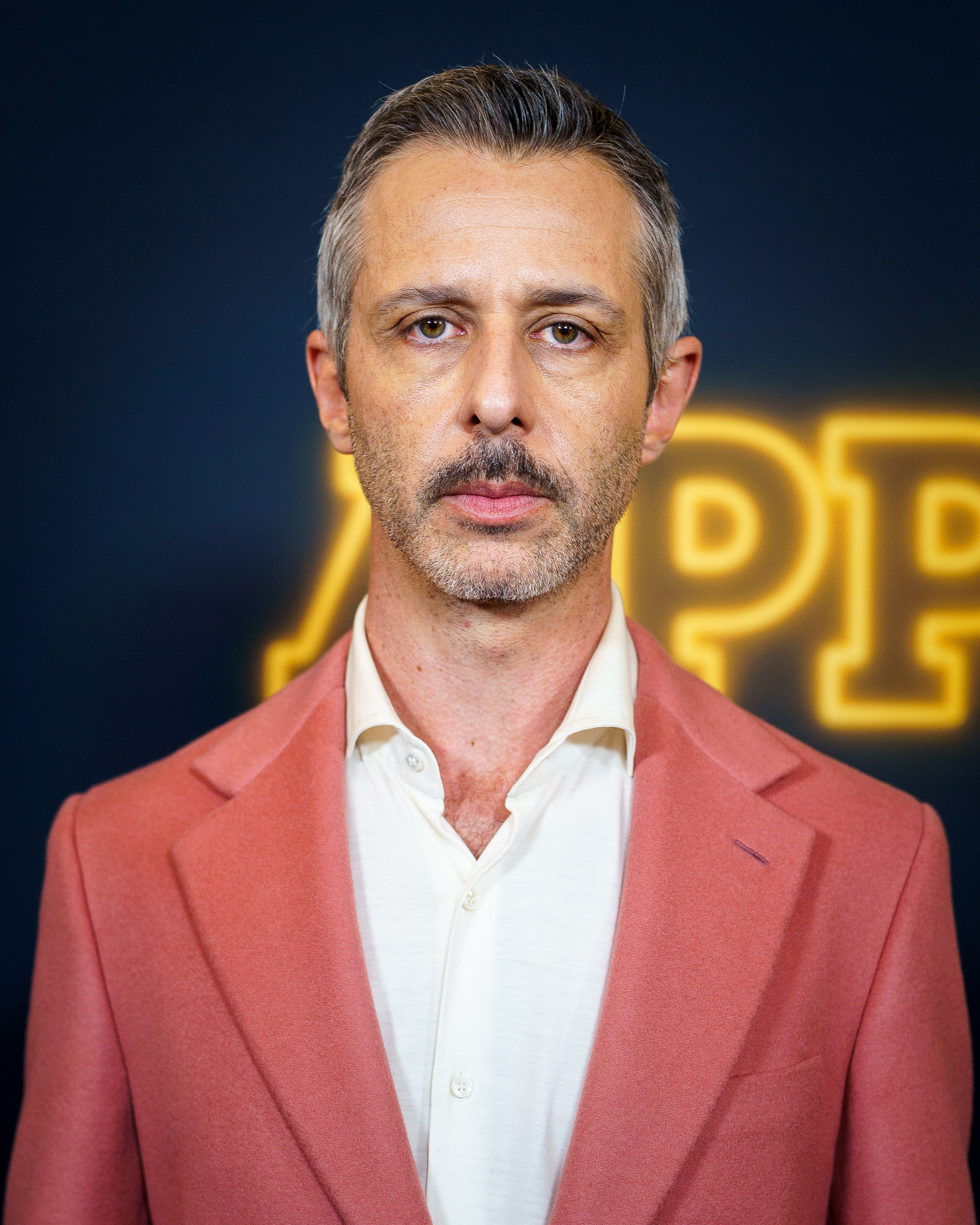
Jeremy Strong won for Succession (2021)

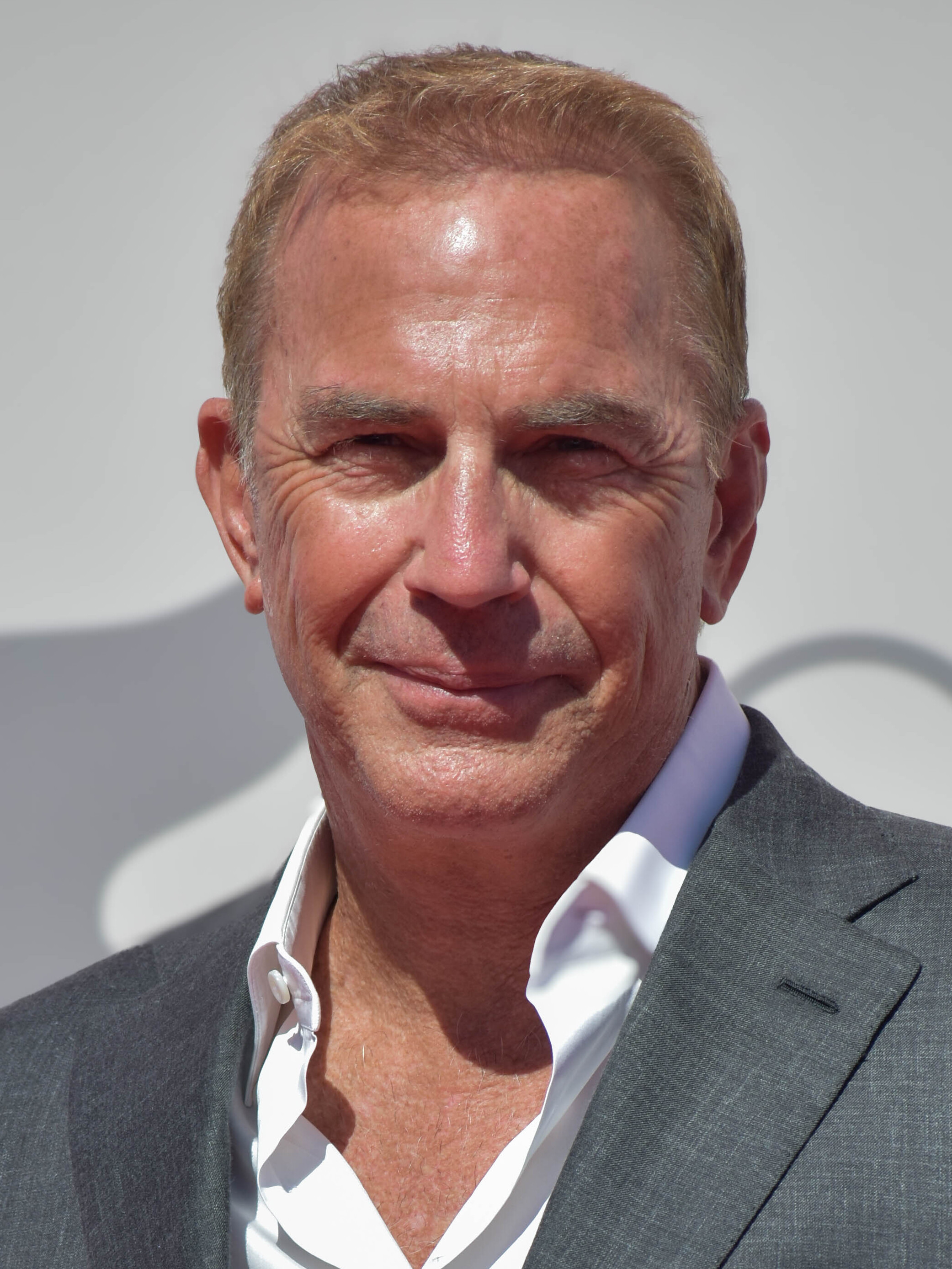
Kevin Costner won for Yellowstone (2022)

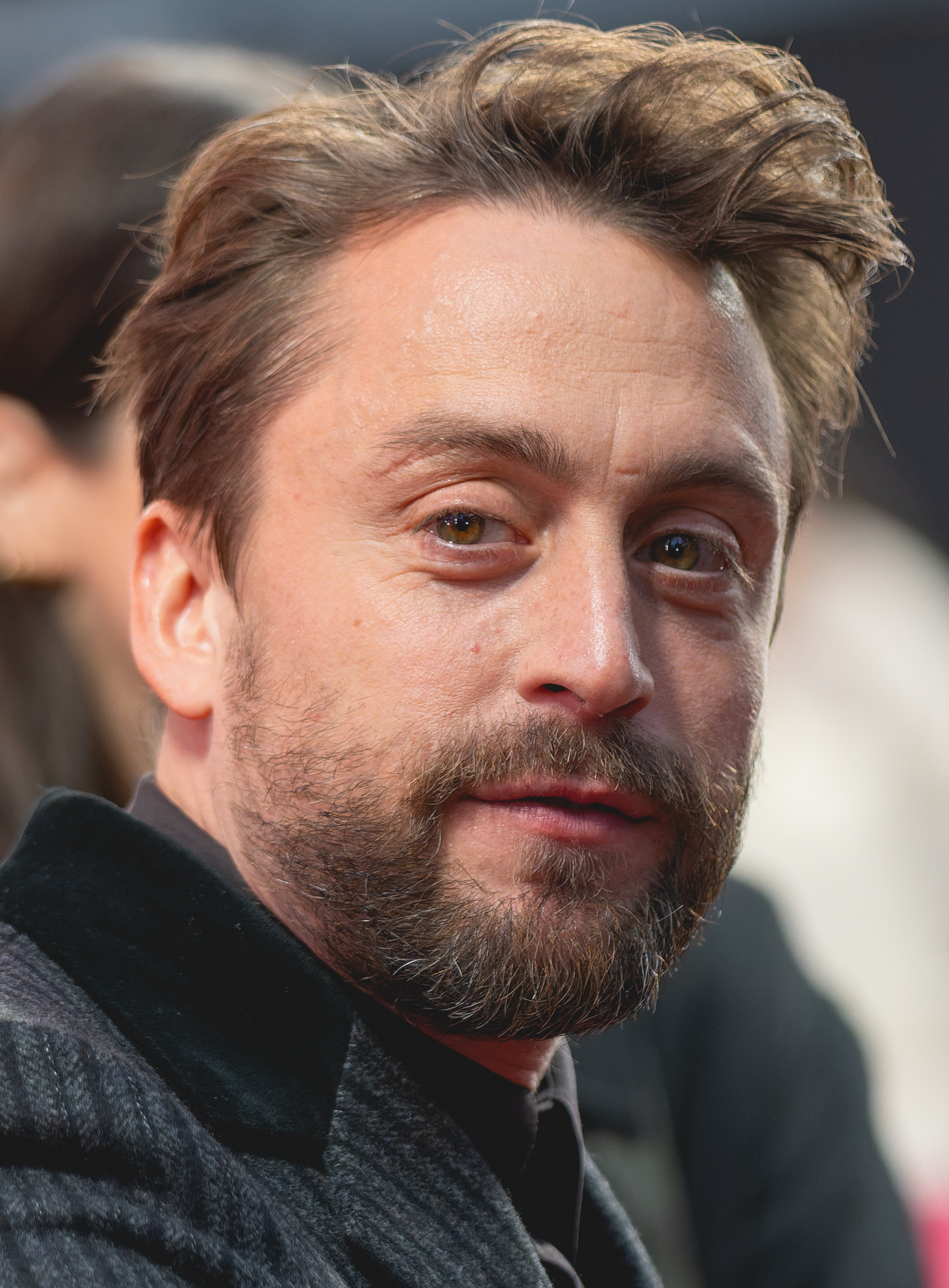
Kieran Culkin won for Succession (2023)

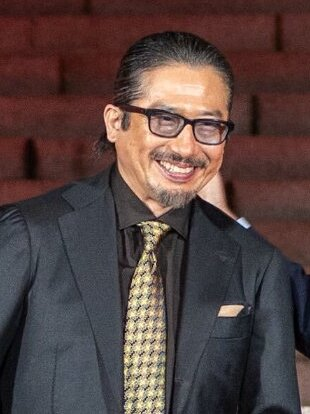
Hiroyuki Sanada won for Shōgun (2024)

Listed below are the winners of the award for each year, as well as the other nominees.

Key	Meaning
‡	Indicates the winning actor.

=== 1960s ===
Year	Actor	Role	Program	Network	Ref
Best TV Star – Male
1961 (19th)
1961 (19th)	John Charles Daly ‡				
1961 (19th)	Bob Newhart ‡				
1962 (20th)
1962 (20th)	Richard Chamberlain ‡	James Kildare	Dr. Kildare	NBC	
1963 (21st)
1963 (21st)	Mickey Rooney ‡	Mickey Grady	Mickey	ABC	
1963 (21st)	Richard Boone	Various Characters	The Richard Boone Show	NBC	
1963 (21st)	Jackie Gleason	Various Characters	American Scene Magazine	CBS	
1963 (21st)	Lorne Greene	Ben Cartwright	Bonanza	NBC	
1963 (21st)	E.G. Marshall	Lawrence Preston	The Defenders	CBS	
1964 (22nd)
1964 (22nd)	Gene Barry ‡	Amos Burke	Burke's Law	ABC	
1964 (22nd)	Richard Crenna	James Slattery	Slattery's People	CBS	
1964 (22nd)	James Franciscus	John Novak	Mr. Novak	NBC	
1964 (22nd)	David Janssen	Richard Kimble	The Fugitive	ABC	
1964 (22nd)	Robert Vaughn	Napoleon Solo	The Man from U.N.C.L.E.	NBC	
1965 (23rd)
1965 (23rd)	David Janssen ‡	Richard Kimble	The Fugitive	ABC	
1965 (23rd)	Ben Gazzara	Paul Bryan	Run for Your Life	NBC	
1965 (23rd)	David McCallum	Illya Kuryakin	The Man from U.N.C.L.E.	NBC	
1965 (23rd)	Robert Vaughn	Napoleon Solo	The Man from U.N.C.L.E.	NBC	
1966 (24th)
1966 (24th)	Dean Martin ‡	Various characters	The Dean Martin Show	NBC	
1966 (24th)	Bill Cosby	Alexander Scott	I Spy	NBC	
1966 (24th)	Robert Culp	Kelly Robinson	I Spy	NBC	
1966 (24th)	Ben Gazzara	Paul Bryan	Run for Your Life	NBC	
1966 (24th)	Christopher George	Sam Troy	The Rat Patrol	ABC	
1967 (25th)
1967 (25th)	Martin Landau ‡	Rollin Hand	Mission: Impossible	CBS	
1967 (25th)	Brendon Boone	Chief	Garrison's Gorillas	ABC	
1967 (25th)	Ben Gazzara	Paul Bryan	Run for Your Life	NBC	
1967 (25th)	Dean Martin	Various characters	The Dean Martin Show	NBC	
1967 (25th)	Andy Williams	Various characters	The Andy Williams Show	NBC	
1968 (26th)
1968 (26th)	Carl Betz ‡	Clinton Judd	Judd, for the Defense	ABC	
1968 (26th)	Raymond Burr	Robert T. Ironside	Ironside	NBC	
1968 (26th)	Peter Graves	Jim Phelps	Mission: Impossible	CBS	
1968 (26th)	Dean Martin	Various characters	The Dean Martin Show	NBC	
1968 (26th)	Efrem Zimbalist Jr.	Lewis Erskine	The F.B.I.	ABC	
Best TV Actor – Drama
1969 (27th)
1969 (27th)	Mike Connors ‡	Joe Mannix	Mannix	CBS	
1969 (27th)	Peter Graves	Jim Phelps	Mission: Impossible	CBS	
1969 (27th)	Lloyd Haynes	Pete Dixion	Room 222	ABC	
1969 (27th)	Robert Wagner	Alexander Mundy	It Takes a Thief	ABC	
1969 (27th)	Robert Young	Dr. Marcus Welby	Marcus Welby, M.D.	ABC	

=== 1970s ===
Year	Actor	Role	Program	Network	Ref
1970 (28th)
1970 (28th)	Peter Graves ‡	Jim Phelps	Mission: Impossible	CBS	
1970 (28th)	Mike Connors	Joe Mannix	Mannix	CBS	
1970 (28th)	Chad Everett	Dr. Joe Gannon	Medical Center	CBS	
1970 (28th)	Burt Reynolds	Lt. Dan August	Dan August	ABC	
1970 (28th)	Robert Young	Dr. Marcus Welby	Marcus Welby, M.D.	ABC	
1971 (29th)
1971 (29th)	Robert Young ‡	Dr. Marcus Welby	Marcus Welby, M.D.	ABC	
1971 (29th)	Raymond Burr	Robert T. Ironside	Ironside	NBC	
1971 (29th)	Mike Connors	Joe Mannix	Mannix	CBS	
1971 (29th)	William Conrad	Frank Cannon	Cannon	CBS	
1971 (29th)	Peter Falk	Lt. Columbo	Columbo	NBC	
1972 (30th)
1972 (30th)	Peter Falk ‡	Lt. Columbo	Columbo	NBC	
1972 (30th)	Mike Connors	Joe Mannix	Mannix	CBS	
1972 (30th)	William Conrad	Frank Cannon	Cannon	CBS	
1972 (30th)	Chad Everett	Dr. Joe Gannon	Medical Center	CBS	
1972 (30th)	David Hartman	Dr. Paul Hunter	The Bold Ones: The New Doctors	NBC	
1972 (30th)	Robert Young	Dr. Marcus Welby	Marcus Welby, M.D.	ABC	
1973 (31st)
1973 (31st)	James Stewart ‡	Billy Jim Hawkins	Hawkins	NBC	
1973 (31st)	David Carradine	Kwai Chang Caine	Kung Fu	ABC	
1973 (31st)	Mike Connors	Joe Mannix	Mannix	CBS	
1973 (31st)	Peter Falk	Lt. Columbo	Columbo	NBC	
1973 (31st)	Richard Thomas	John-Boy Walton	The Waltons	CBS	
1973 (31st)	Robert Young	Dr. Marcus Welby	Marcus Welby, M.D.	ABC	
1974 (32nd)
1974 (32nd)	Telly Savalas ‡	Lt. Theo Kojak	Kojak	CBS	
1974 (32nd)	Mike Connors	Joe Mannix	Mannix	CBS	
1974 (32nd)	Michael Douglas	Steve Keller	The Streets of San Francisco	ABC	
1974 (32nd)	Peter Falk	Lt. Columbo	Columbo	NBC	
1974 (32nd)	Richard Thomas	John-Boy Walton	The Waltons	CBS	
1975 (33rd)
1975 (33rd)	Robert Blake ‡	Tony Baretta	Baretta	ABC	
1975 (33rd)	Telly Savalas ‡	Lt. Theo Kojak	Kojak	CBS	
1975 (33rd)	Peter Falk	Lt. Columbo	Columbo	NBC	
1975 (33rd)	Karl Malden	Mike Stone	The Streets of San Francisco	ABC	
1975 (33rd)	Barry Newman	Anthony J. Petrocelli	Petrocelli	NBC	
1976 (34th)
1976 (34th)	Richard Jordan ‡	Joseph Armagh	Captains and the Kings	NBC	
1976 (34th)	Lee Majors	Steve Austin	The Six Million Dollar Man	ABC	
1976 (34th)	Nick Nolte	Tom Jordache	Rich Man, Poor Man	ABC	
1976 (34th)	Telly Savalas	Lt. Theo Kojak	Kojak	CBS	
1976 (34th)	Peter Strauss	Rudy Jordache	Rich Man, Poor Man	ABC	
1977 (35th)
1977 (35th)	Ed Asner ‡	Lou Grant	Lou Grant	CBS	
1977 (35th)	Robert Conrad	Gregory "Pappy" Boyington	Baa Baa Black Sheep	NBC	
1977 (35th)	Peter Falk	Lt. Columbo	Columbo	NBC	
1977 (35th)	James Garner	Jim Rockford	The Rockford Files	NBC	
1977 (35th)	Telly Savalas	Lt. Theo Kojak	Kojak	CBS	
1978 (36th)
1978 (36th)	Michael Moriarty ‡	Eric Dorf	Holocaust	NBC	
1978 (36th)	Ed Asner	Lou Grant	Lou Grant	CBS	
1978 (36th)	James Garner	Jim Rockford	The Rockford Files	NBC	
1978 (36th)	Richard Hatch	Captain Apollo	Battlestar Galactica	ABC	
1978 (36th)	John Houseman	Professor Charles W. Kingsfield, Jr.	The Paper Chase	CBS	
1978 (36th)	Michael Landon	Charles Ingalls	Little House on the Prairie	NBC	
1979 (37th)
1979 (37th)	Ed Asner ‡	Lou Grant	Lou Grant	CBS	
1979 (37th)	Richard Chamberlain	Alexander McKeag	Centennial	NBC	
1979 (37th)	Erik Estrada	Officer Francis Llewellyn 'Ponch' Poncherello	CHiPs	NBC	
1979 (37th)	James Garner	Jim Rockford	The Rockford Files	NBC	
1979 (37th)	John Houseman	Professor Charles W. Kingsfield, Jr.	The Paper Chase	CBS	
1979 (37th)	Martin Sheen	John Dean	Blind Ambition	CBS	
1979 (37th)	Robert Urich	Dan Tanna	Vega$	ABC	
1979 (37th)	Robert Wagner	Jonathan Hart	Hart to Hart	ABC	

=== 1980s ===
Year	Actor	Role	Program	Network	Ref
1980 (38th)
1980 (38th)	Richard Chamberlain ‡	John Blackthorne	Shōgun	NBC	
1980 (38th)	Ed Asner	Lou Grant	Lou Grant	CBS	
1980 (38th)	Larry Hagman	J. R. Ewing	Dallas	CBS	
1980 (38th)	Robert Urich	Dan Tanna	Vega$	ABC	
1980 (38th)	Robert Wagner	Jonathan Hart	Hart to Hart	ABC	
1981 (39th)
1981 (39th)	Daniel J. Travanti ‡	Capt. Frank Furillo	Hill Street Blues	NBC	
1981 (39th)	Ed Asner	Lou Grant	Lou Grant	CBS	
1981 (39th)	John Forsythe	Blake Carrington	Dynasty	ABC	
1981 (39th)	Larry Hagman	J. R. Ewing	Dallas	CBS	
1981 (39th)	Tom Selleck	Thomas Magnum	Magnum, P.I.	CBS	
1982 (40th)
1982 (40th)	John Forsythe ‡	Blake Carrington	Dynasty	ABC	
1982 (40th)	Larry Hagman	J. R. Ewing	Dallas	CBS	
1982 (40th)	Tom Selleck	Thomas Magnum	Magnum, P.I.	CBS	
1982 (40th)	Daniel J. Travanti	Capt. Frank Furillo	Hill Street Blues	NBC	
1982 (40th)	Robert Wagner	Jonathan Hart	Hart to Hart	ABC	
1983 (41st)
1983 (41st)	John Forsythe ‡	Blake Carrington	Dynasty	ABC	
1983 (41st)	James Brolin	Peter McDermott	Hotel	ABC	
1983 (41st)	Tom Selleck	Thomas Magnum	Magnum, P.I.	CBS	
1983 (41st)	Daniel J. Travanti	Capt. Frank Furillo	Hill Street Blues	NBC	
1983 (41st)	Robert Wagner	Jonathan Hart	Hart to Hart	ABC	
1984 (42nd)
1984 (42nd)	Tom Selleck ‡	Thomas Magnum	Magnum, P.I.	CBS	
1984 (42nd)	James Brolin	Peter McDermott	Hotel	ABC	
1984 (42nd)	John Forsythe	Blake Carrington	Dynasty	ABC	
1984 (42nd)	Larry Hagman	J. R. Ewing	Dallas	CBS	
1984 (42nd)	Stacy Keach	Mike Hammer	Mike Hammer	CBS	
1984 (42nd)	Daniel J. Travanti	Capt. Frank Furillo	Hill Street Blues	NBC	
1985 (43rd)
1985 (43rd)	Don Johnson ‡	Sonny Crockett	Miami Vice	NBC	
1985 (43rd)	John Forsythe	Blake Carrington	Dynasty	ABC	
1985 (43rd)	Tom Selleck	Thomas Magnum	Magnum, P.I.	CBS	
1985 (43rd)	Philip Michael Thomas	Ricardo Tubbs	Miami Vice	NBC	
1985 (43rd)	Daniel J. Travanti	Capt. Frank Furillo	Hill Street Blues	NBC	
1986 (44th)
1986 (44th)	Edward Woodward ‡	Robert McCall	The Equalizer	CBS	
1986 (44th)	William Devane	Greg Sumner	Knots Landing	CBS	
1986 (44th)	John Forsythe	Blake Carrington	Dynasty	ABC	
1986 (44th)	Don Johnson	Sonny Crockett	Miami Vice	NBC	
1986 (44th)	Tom Selleck	Thomas Magnum	Magnum, P.I.	CBS	
1987 (45th)
1987 (45th)	Richard Kiley ‡	Joe Gardner	A Year in the Life	NBC	
1987 (45th)	Harry Hamlin	Michael Kuzak	L.A. Law	NBC	
1987 (45th)	Tom Selleck	Thomas Magnum	Magnum, P.I.	CBS	
1987 (45th)	Michael Tucker	Stuart Markowitz	L.A. Law	NBC	
1987 (45th)	Edward Woodward	Robert McCall	The Equalizer	CBS	
1988 (46th)
1988 (46th)	Ron Perlman ‡	Vincent	Beauty and the Beast	CBS	
1988 (46th)	Corbin Bernsen	Arnie Becker	L.A. Law	NBC	
1988 (46th)	Harry Hamlin	Michael Kuzak	L.A. Law	NBC	
1988 (46th)	Carroll O'Connor	Chief Bill Gillespie	In the Heat of the Night	NBC	
1988 (46th)	Ken Wahl	Vinnie Terranova	Wiseguy	CBS	
1989 (47th)
1989 (47th)	Ken Wahl ‡	Vinnie Terranova	Wiseguy	CBS	
1989 (47th)	Corbin Bernsen	Arnie Becker	L.A. Law	NBC	
1989 (47th)	Harry Hamlin	Michael Kuzak	L.A. Law	NBC	
1989 (47th)	Carroll O'Connor	Chief Bill Gillespie	In the Heat of the Night	NBC	
1989 (47th)	Ken Olin	Michael Steadman	thirtysomething	ABC	

=== 1990s ===
Year	Actor	Role	Program	Network	Ref
1990 (48th)
1990 (48th)	Kyle MacLachlan ‡	Dale Cooper	Twin Peaks	ABC	
1990 (48th)	Scott Bakula	Sam Beckett	Quantum Leap	NBC	
1990 (48th)	Peter Falk	Lt. Columbo	Columbo	ABC	
1990 (48th)	James Earl Jones	Gabriel Bird	Gabriel's Fire	ABC	
1990 (48th)	Carroll O'Connor	Chief Bill Gillespie	In the Heat of the Night	NBC	
1991 (49th)
1991 (49th)	Scott Bakula ‡	Sam Beckett	Quantum Leap	NBC	
1991 (49th)	Mark Harmon	Dickie Cobb	Reasonable Doubts	NBC	
1991 (49th)	James Earl Jones	Gabriel Bird	Gabriel's Fire	ABC	
1991 (49th)	Rob Morrow	Joel Fleischman	Northern Exposure	CBS	
1991 (49th)	Carroll O'Connor	Chief Bill Gillespie	In the Heat of the Night	NBC	
1991 (49th)	Sam Waterston	Forrest Bedford	I'll Fly Away	NBC	
1992 (50th)
1992 (50th)	Sam Waterston ‡	Forrest Bedford	I'll Fly Away	NBC	
1992 (50th)	Scott Bakula	Sam Beckett	Quantum Leap	NBC	
1992 (50th)	Mark Harmon	Dickie Cobb	Reasonable Doubts	NBC	
1992 (50th)	Rob Morrow	Joel Fleischman	Northern Exposure	CBS	
1992 (50th)	Jason Priestley	Brandon Walsh	Beverly Hills, 90210	Fox	
1993 (51st)
1993 (51st)	David Caruso ‡	John Kelly	NYPD Blue	ABC	
1993 (51st)	Michael Moriarty	Benjamin Stone	Law & Order	NBC	
1993 (51st)	Rob Morrow	Joel Fleischman	Northern Exposure	CBS	
1993 (51st)	Carroll O'Connor	Bill Gillespie	In the Heat of the Night	CBS	
1993 (51st)	Tom Skerritt	Jimmy Brock	Picket Fences	CBS	
1994 (52nd)
1994 (52nd)	Dennis Franz ‡	Andy Sipowicz	NYPD Blue	ABC	
1994 (52nd)	Mandy Patinkin	Jeffrey Geiger	Chicago Hope	CBS	
1994 (52nd)	Jason Priestley	Brandon Walsh	Beverly Hills, 90210	Fox	
1994 (52nd)	Tom Skerritt	Jimmy Brock	Picket Fences	CBS	
1994 (52nd)	Sam Waterston	Jack McCoy	Law & Order	NBC	
1995 (53rd)
1995 (53rd)	Jimmy Smits ‡	Bobby Simone	NYPD Blue	ABC	
1995 (53rd)	Daniel Benzali	Theodore Hoffman	Murder One	ABC	
1995 (53rd)	George Clooney	Doug Ross	ER	NBC	
1995 (53rd)	David Duchovny	Fox Mulder	The X-Files	Fox	
1995 (53rd)	Anthony Edwards	Mark Greene	ER	NBC	
1996 (54th)
1996 (54th)	David Duchovny ‡	Fox Mulder	The X-Files	Fox	
1996 (54th)	George Clooney	Doug Ross	ER	NBC	
1996 (54th)	Anthony Edwards	Mark Greene	ER	NBC	
1996 (54th)	Lance Henriksen	Frank Black	Millennium	Fox	
1996 (54th)	Jimmy Smits	Bobby Simone	NYPD Blue	ABC	
1997 (55th)
1997 (55th)	Anthony Edwards ‡	Mark Greene	ER	NBC	
1997 (55th)	Kevin Anderson	Francis Xavier Reyneaux	Nothing Sacred	ABC	
1997 (55th)	George Clooney	Doug Ross	ER	NBC	
1997 (55th)	David Duchovny	Fox Mulder	The X-Files	Fox	
1997 (55th)	Lance Henriksen	Frank Black	Millennium	Fox	
1998 (56th)
1998 (56th)	Dylan McDermott ‡	Bobby Donnell	The Practice	ABC	
1998 (56th)	David Duchovny	Fox Mulder	The X-Files	Fox	
1998 (56th)	Anthony Edwards	Mark Greene	ER	NBC	
1998 (56th)	Lance Henriksen	Frank Black	Millennium	Fox	
1998 (56th)	Jimmy Smits	Bobby Simone	NYPD Blue	ABC	
1999 (57th)
1999 (57th)	James Gandolfini ‡	Tony Soprano	The Sopranos	HBO	
1999 (57th)	Billy Campbell	Rick Sammler	Once and Again	ABC	
1999 (57th)	Rob Lowe	Sam Seaborn	The West Wing	NBC	
1999 (57th)	Dylan McDermott	Bobby Donnell	The Practice	ABC	
1999 (57th)	Martin Sheen	Josiah Bartlet	The West Wing	NBC	

=== 2000s ===
Year	Actor	Role	Program	Network	Ref
2000 (58th)
2000 (58th)	Martin Sheen ‡	Josiah Bartlet	The West Wing	NBC	
2000 (58th)	Andre Braugher	Ben Gideon	Gideon's Crossing	ABC	
2000 (58th)	James Gandolfini	Tony Soprano	The Sopranos	HBO	
2000 (58th)	Rob Lowe	Sam Seaborn	The West Wing	NBC	
2000 (58th)	Dylan McDermott	Bobby Donnell	The Practice	ABC	
2001 (59th)
2001 (59th)	Kiefer Sutherland ‡	Jack Bauer	24	Fox	
2001 (59th)	Simon Baker	Nick Fallin	The Guardian	CBS	
2001 (59th)	James Gandolfini	Tony Soprano	The Sopranos	HBO	
2001 (59th)	Peter Krause	Nate Fisher	Six Feet Under	HBO	
2001 (59th)	Martin Sheen	Josiah Bartlet	The West Wing	NBC	
2002 (60th)
2002 (60th)	Michael Chiklis ‡	Vic Mackey	The Shield	FX	
2002 (60th)	James Gandolfini	Tony Soprano	The Sopranos	HBO	
2002 (60th)	Peter Krause	Nate Fisher	Six Feet Under	HBO	
2002 (60th)	Martin Sheen	Josiah Bartlet	The West Wing	NBC	
2002 (60th)	Kiefer Sutherland	Jack Bauer	24	Fox	
2003 (61st)
2003 (61st)	Anthony LaPaglia ‡	Jack Malone	Without a Trace	CBS	
2003 (61st)	Michael Chiklis	Vic Mackey	The Shield	FX	
2003 (61st)	William Petersen	Gil Grissom	CSI: Crime Scene Investigation	CBS	
2003 (61st)	Martin Sheen	Josiah Bartlet	The West Wing	NBC	
2003 (61st)	Kiefer Sutherland	Jack Bauer	24	Fox	
2004 (62nd)
2004 (62nd)	Ian McShane ‡	Al Swearengen	Deadwood	HBO	
2004 (62nd)	Michael Chiklis	Vic Mackey	The Shield	FX	
2004 (62nd)	Denis Leary	Tommy Gavin	Rescue Me	FX	
2004 (62nd)	Julian McMahon	Christian Troy	Nip/Tuck	FX	
2004 (62nd)	James Spader	Alan Shore	Boston Legal	ABC	
2005 (63rd)
2005 (63rd)	Hugh Laurie ‡	Gregory House	House	Fox	
2005 (63rd)	Patrick Dempsey	Derek Shepherd	Grey's Anatomy	ABC	
2005 (63rd)	Matthew Fox	Jack Shephard	Lost	ABC	
2005 (63rd)	Wentworth Miller	Michael Scofield	Prison Break	Fox	
2005 (63rd)	Kiefer Sutherland	Jack Bauer	24	Fox	
2006 (64th)
2006 (64th)	Hugh Laurie ‡	Gregory House	House	Fox	
2006 (64th)	Patrick Dempsey	Derek Shepherd	Grey's Anatomy	ABC	
2006 (64th)	Michael C. Hall	Dexter Morgan	Dexter	Showtime	
2006 (64th)	Bill Paxton	Bill Henrickson	Big Love	HBO	
2006 (64th)	Kiefer Sutherland	Jack Bauer	24	Fox	
2007 (65th)
2007 (65th)	Jon Hamm ‡	Don Draper	Mad Men	AMC	
2007 (65th)	Michael C. Hall	Dexter Morgan	Dexter	Showtime	
2007 (65th)	Hugh Laurie	Gregory House	House	Fox	
2007 (65th)	Bill Paxton	Bill Henrickson	Big Love	HBO	
2007 (65th)	Jonathan Rhys Meyers	Henry VIII of England	The Tudors	Showtime	
2008 (66th)
2008 (66th)	Gabriel Byrne ‡	Paul Weston	In Treatment	HBO	
2008 (66th)	Michael C. Hall	Dexter Morgan	Dexter	Showtime	
2008 (66th)	Jon Hamm	Don Draper	Mad Men	AMC	
2008 (66th)	Hugh Laurie	Gregory House	House	Fox	
2008 (66th)	Jonathan Rhys Meyers	Henry VIII of England	The Tudors	Showtime	
2009 (67th)
2009 (67th)	Michael C. Hall ‡	Dexter Morgan	Dexter	Showtime	
2009 (67th)	Simon Baker	Patrick Jane	The Mentalist	CBS	
2009 (67th)	Jon Hamm	Don Draper	Mad Men	AMC	
2009 (67th)	Hugh Laurie	Gregory House	House	Fox	
2009 (67th)	Bill Paxton	Bill Henrickson	Big Love	HBO	

=== 2010s ===
Year	Actor	Role	Program	Network	Ref
2010 (68th)
2010 (68th)	Steve Buscemi ‡	Nucky Thompson	Boardwalk Empire	HBO	
2010 (68th)	Bryan Cranston	Walter White	Breaking Bad	AMC	
2010 (68th)	Michael C. Hall	Dexter Morgan	Dexter	Showtime	
2010 (68th)	Jon Hamm	Don Draper	Mad Men	AMC	
2010 (68th)	Hugh Laurie	Gregory House	House	Fox	
2011 (69th)
2011 (69th)	Kelsey Grammer ‡	Tom Kane	Boss	Starz	
2011 (69th)	Steve Buscemi	Nucky Thompson	Boardwalk Empire	HBO	
2011 (69th)	Bryan Cranston	Walter White	Breaking Bad	AMC	
2011 (69th)	Jeremy Irons	Pope Alexander VI	The Borgias	Showtime	
2011 (69th)	Damian Lewis	Nicholas Brody	Homeland	Showtime	
2012 (70th)
2012 (70th)	Damian Lewis ‡	Nicholas Brody	Homeland	Showtime	
2012 (70th)	Steve Buscemi	Nucky Thompson	Boardwalk Empire	HBO	
2012 (70th)	Bryan Cranston	Walter White	Breaking Bad	AMC	
2012 (70th)	Jeff Daniels	Will McAvoy	The Newsroom	HBO	
2012 (70th)	Jon Hamm	Don Draper	Mad Men	AMC	
2013 (71st)
2013 (71st)	Bryan Cranston ‡	Walter White	Breaking Bad	AMC	
2013 (71st)	Liev Schreiber	Ray Donovan	Ray Donovan	Showtime	
2013 (71st)	Michael Sheen	William Masters	Masters of Sex	Showtime	
2013 (71st)	Kevin Spacey	Frank Underwood	House of Cards	Netflix	
2013 (71st)	James Spader	Raymond "Red" Reddington	The Blacklist	NBC	
2014 (72nd)
2014 (72nd)	Kevin Spacey ‡	Frank Underwood	House of Cards	Netflix	
2014 (72nd)	Clive Owen	John "Thack" Thackery	The Knick	Cinemax	
2014 (72nd)	Liev Schreiber	Ray Donovan	Ray Donovan	Showtime	
2014 (72nd)	James Spader	Raymond "Red" Reddington	The Blacklist	NBC	
2014 (72nd)	Dominic West	Noah Solloway	The Affair	Showtime	
2015 (73rd)
2015 (73rd)	Jon Hamm ‡	Don Draper	Mad Men	AMC	
2015 (73rd)	Rami Malek	Elliot Alderson	Mr. Robot	USA	
2015 (73rd)	Wagner Moura	Pablo Escobar	Narcos	Netflix	
2015 (73rd)	Bob Odenkirk	Saul Goodman	Better Call Saul	AMC	
2015 (73rd)	Liev Schreiber	Ray Donovan	Ray Donovan	Showtime	
2016 (74th)
2016 (74th)	Billy Bob Thornton ‡	Billy McBride	Goliath	Amazon Prime Video	
2016 (74th)	Rami Malek	Elliot Alderson	Mr. Robot	USA	
2016 (74th)	Bob Odenkirk	Saul Goodman	Better Call Saul	AMC	
2016 (74th)	Matthew Rhys	Philip Jennings	The Americans	FX	
2016 (74th)	Liev Schreiber	Ray Donovan	Ray Donovan	Showtime	
2017 (75th)
2017 (75th)	Sterling K. Brown ‡	Randall Pearson	This Is Us	NBC	
2017 (75th)	Jason Bateman	Martin "Marty" Byrde	Ozark	Netflix	
2017 (75th)	Freddie Highmore	Dr. Shaun Murphy	The Good Doctor	ABC	
2017 (75th)	Bob Odenkirk	Saul Goodman	Better Call Saul	AMC	
2017 (75th)	Liev Schreiber	Ray Donovan	Ray Donovan	Showtime	
2018 (76th)
2018 (76th)	Richard Madden ‡	David Budd	Bodyguard	Netflix	
2018 (76th)	Jason Bateman	Martin "Marty" Byrde	Ozark	Netflix	
2018 (76th)	Stephan James	Walter Cruz	Homecoming	Prime Video	
2018 (76th)	Billy Porter	Pray Tell	Pose	FX	
2018 (76th)	Matthew Rhys	Philip Jennings	The Americans	FX	
2019 (77th)
2019 (77th)	Brian Cox ‡	Logan Roy	Succession	HBO	
2019 (77th)	Kit Harington	Jon Snow	Game of Thrones	HBO	
2019 (77th)	Rami Malek	Elliot Alderson	Mr. Robot	USA	
2019 (77th)	Tobias Menzies	Prince Philip, Duke of Edinburgh	The Crown	Netflix	
2019 (77th)	Billy Porter	Pray Tell	Pose	FX	

=== 2020s ===
Year	Actor	Role	Program	Network	Ref
2020 (78th)
2020 (78th)	Josh O'Connor ‡	Charles, Prince of Wales	The Crown	Netflix	
2020 (78th)	Jason Bateman	Martin "Marty" Byrde	Ozark	Netflix	
2020 (78th)	Bob Odenkirk	Saul Goodman	Better Call Saul	AMC	
2020 (78th)	Al Pacino	Meyer Offerman	Hunters	Prime Video	
2020 (78th)	Matthew Rhys	Perry Mason	Perry Mason	HBO	
2021 (79th)
2021 (79th)	Jeremy Strong ‡	Kendall Roy	Succession	HBO	
2021 (79th)	Brian Cox	Logan Roy	Succession	HBO	
2021 (79th)	Lee Jung-jae	Seong Gi-hun	Squid Game	Netflix	
2021 (79th)	Billy Porter	Pray Tell	Pose	FX	
2021 (79th)	Omar Sy	Assane Diop	Lupin	Netflix	
2022 (80th)
2022 (80th)	Kevin Costner ‡	John Dutton	Yellowstone	Paramount Network	
2022 (80th)	Jeff Bridges	Dan Chase	The Old Man	FX	
2022 (80th)	Diego Luna	Cassian Andor	Andor	Disney+	
2022 (80th)	Bob Odenkirk	Saul Goodman	Better Call Saul	AMC	
2022 (80th)	Adam Scott	Mark Scout	Severance	Apple TV	
2023 (81st)
2023 (81st)	Kieran Culkin ‡	Roman Roy	Succession	HBO	
2023 (81st)	Brian Cox	Logan Roy	Succession	HBO	
2023 (81st)	Gary Oldman	Jackson Lamb	Slow Horses	Apple TV	
2023 (81st)	Pedro Pascal	Joel Miller	The Last of Us	HBO	
2023 (81st)	Jeremy Strong	Kendall Roy	Succession	HBO	
2023 (81st)	Dominic West	Charles, Prince of Wales	The Crown	Netflix	
2024 (82nd)
2024 (82nd)	Hiroyuki Sanada ‡	Lord Yoshii Toranaga	Shōgun	FX	
2024 (82nd)	Donald Glover	John Smith / Michael	Mr. & Mrs. Smith	Prime Video	
2024 (82nd)	Jake Gyllenhaal	Rozat "Rusty" Sabich	Presumed Innocent	Apple TV	
2024 (82nd)	Gary Oldman	Jackson Lamb	Slow Horses	Apple TV	
2024 (82nd)	Eddie Redmayne	Alexander Duggan / The Jackal	The Day of the Jackal	Peacock	
2024 (82nd)	Billy Bob Thornton	Tommy Norris	Landman	Paramount+	
2025 (83rd)
2025 (83rd)	Noah Wyle ‡	Michael Robinavitch	The Pitt	HBO Max	
2025 (83rd)	Sterling K. Brown	Xavier Collins	Paradise	Hulu	
2025 (83rd)	Diego Luna	Cassian Andor	Andor	Disney+	
2025 (83rd)	Gary Oldman	Jackson Lamb	Slow Horses	Apple TV	
2025 (83rd)	Mark Ruffalo	Tom Brandis	Task	HBO	
2025 (83rd)	Adam Scott	Mark Scout / Mark S.	Severance	Apple TV	

== Actors with multiple awards ==
2 wins

- Ed Asner
- John Forsythe
- Jon Hamm
- Hugh Laurie
- Telly Savalas

== Series with multiple awards ==
3 wins

- NYPD Blue (ABC)
- Succession (HBO)

2 wins

- Dynasty (ABC)
- House (Fox)
- Kojak (CBS)
- Lou Grant (CBS)
- Mad Men (AMC)
- Mission: Impossible (CBS)

== Actors with multiple nominations ==
7 nominations

- Peter Falk
- Tom Selleck

6 nominations

- Mike Connors
- John Forsythe
- Jon Hamm
- Hugh Laurie
- Martin Sheen

5 nominations

- Ed Asner
- Michael C. Hall
- Carroll O'Connor
- Bob Odenkirk
- Liev Schreiber
- Kiefer Sutherland
- Daniel J. Travanti
- Robert Wagner
- Robert Young

4 nominations

- Bryan Cranston
- David Duchovny
- Anthony Edwards
- James Gandolfini
- Larry Hagman
- Telly Savalas

3 nominations

- Scott Bakula
- Jason Bateman
- Steve Buscemi
- Michael Chiklis
- George Clooney
- Brian Cox
- James Garner
- Peter Graves
- Harry Hamlin
- Lance Henriksen
- Rami Malek
- Dylan McDermott
- Rob Morrow
- Gary Oldman
- Bill Paxton
- Billy Porter
- Matthew Rhys
- Jimmy Smits
- James Spader
- Sam Waterston

2 nominations

- Simon Baker
- Corbin Bernsen
- James Brolin
- Sterling K. Brown
- Raymond Burr
- Richard Chamberlain
- William Conrad
- Patrick Dempsey
- Chad Everett
- Mark Harmon
- John Houseman
- Don Johnson
- James Earl Jones
- Peter Krause
- Damian Lewis
- Rob Lowe
- Diego Luna
- Jonathan Rhys Meyers
- Michael Moriarty
- Jason Priestley
- Adam Scott
- Tom Skerritt
- Kevin Spacey
- Jeremy Strong
- Richard Thomas
- Billy Bob Thornton
- Robert Urich
- Ken Wahl
- Dominic West
- Edward Woodward

== TV Series with multiple nominations ==
7 nominations

- Columbo (NBC)
- ER (NBC)
- Magnum, P.I. (CBS)
- The West Wing (NBC)

6 nominations

- Dynasty (ABC)
- House (Fox)
- L.A. Law (NBC)
- Mad Men (AMC)
- Mannix (CBS)
- Succession (HBO)

5 nominations

- 24 (Fox)
- Better Call Saul (AMC)
- Dexter (Showtime)
- Hill Street Blues (NBC)
- In the Heat of the Night (NBC)
- Lou Grant (CBS)
- Marcus Welby, M.D. (ABC)
- NYPD Blue (ABC)
- Ray Donovan (Showtime)

4 nominations

- Breaking Bad (AMC)
- Dallas (CBS)
- Hart to Hart (ABC)
- Kojak (CBS)
- Mission: Impossible (CBS)
- The Sopranos (HBO)
- The X-Files (Fox)

3 nominations

- Big Love (HBO)
- Boardwalk Empire (HBO)
- The Crown (Netflix)
- The Dean Martin Show (NBC)
- The Man from U.N.C.L.E. (NBC)
- Miami Vice (NBC)
- Millennium (Fox)
- Mr. Robot (USA)
- Northern Exposure (CBS)
- Ozark (Netflix)
- Pose (FX)
- The Practice (ABC)
- Quantum Leap (NBC)
- The Rockford Files (NBC)
- Run for Your Life (NBC)
- The Shield (FX)
- Slow Horses (Apple TV+)

2 nominations

- The Americans (FX)
- Andor (Disney+)
- Beverly Hills, 90210 (Fox)
- The Blacklist (NBC)
- Cannon (CBS)
- The Equalizer (CBS)
- The Fugitive (ABC)
- Gabriel's Fire (ABC)
- I'll Fly Away (NBC)
- I Spy (NBC)
- Grey's Anatomy (ABC)
- Homeland (Showtime)
- Hotel (ABC)
- Ironside (NBC)
- Law & Order (NBC)
- Medical Center (CBS)
- The Paper Chase (CBS)
- Picket Fences (CBS)
- Reasonable Doubts (NBC)
- Rich Man, Poor Man (ABC)
- Severance (Apple TV+)
- Six Feet Under (HBO)
- The Streets of San Francisco (ABC)
- The Tudors (Showtime)
- Vega$ (ABC)
- The Waltons (CBS)
- Wiseguy (NBC)

== See also ==
- Primetime Emmy Award for Outstanding Lead Actor in a Drama Series
- Screen Actors Guild Award for Outstanding Performance by a Male Actor in a Drama Series
