= List of awards and nominations received by Jeremy Strong =

Jeremy Strong awards and nominations
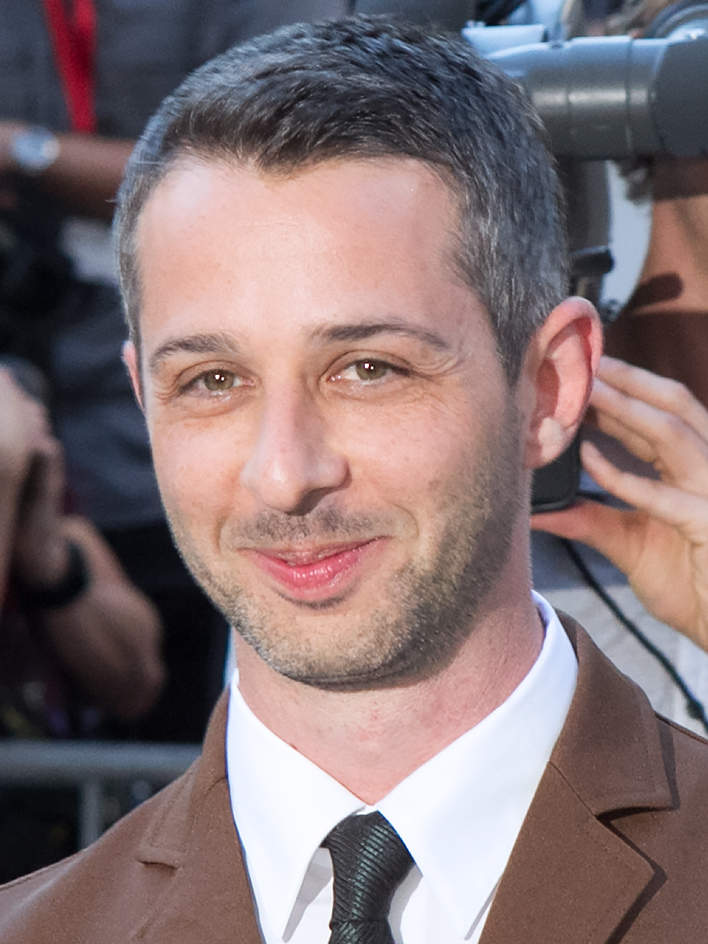
- Strong in 2014
Awards and nominations
Award	Wins	Nominations
Academy Awards	0	1
Actor Awards	3	5
BAFTA Awards	0	1
Golden Globes	1	3
Primetime Emmy Awards	1	3
Tony Awards	1	1
- Totals
Awards won	10
Nominations	31

Jeremy Strong is an American actor known for his roles on stage and screen. He has received a Tony Award, a Primetime Emmy Award, a Golden Globe Award, a Critics' Choice Television Award, and three Actor Awards, in addition to nominations for an Academy Award and a BAFTA Award.

Strong earned acclaim for his breakthrough role as Kendall Roy in the HBO black comedy-drama series Succession from 2018 to 2023. For his performance, he earned several awards including the Primetime Emmy Award for Outstanding Lead Actor in a Drama Series, Golden Globe Award for Best Actor - Television Series Drama and the Critics' Choice Television Award for Best Actor in a Drama Series as well as a nominations for the Screen Actors Guild Award for Outstanding Actor in a Drama Series, and the TCA Award for Individual Achievement in Drama.

On Broadway, he received the Tony Award for Best Actor in a Play for his role as Dr. Thomas Stockmann in the revival of the Henrik Ibsen play An Enemy of the People (2024). He also earned nominations for the Drama League Award and Outer Critics Circle Award. He previously received Lucille Lortel Award nominations for his roles in the David Ives play New Jerusalem (2008) and in the Nick Jones play The Coward (2011).

For his role as Roy Cohn in the Donald Trump biographical film The Apprentice (2024) he was nominated as Best Supporting Actor for the Academy Award, BAFTA Award, SAG and Golden Globe.

== Major associations ==
=== Academy Awards ===
Year	Category	Nominated work	Result	Ref.
2024	Best Supporting Actor	The Apprentice	Nominated	

=== Actor Awards ===
Year	Category	Nominated work	Result	Ref.
2015	Outstanding Performance by a Cast in a Motion Picture	The Big Short	Nominated	
2020	Outstanding Performance by a Cast in a Motion Picture	The Trial of the Chicago 7	Won	
2021	Outstanding Performance by an Ensemble in a Drama Series	Succession (season 3)	Won	
2021	Outstanding Performance by a Male Actor in a Drama Series	Succession (season 3)	Nominated	
2023	Outstanding Performance by an Ensemble in a Drama Series	Succession (season 4)	Won	
2024	Outstanding Performance by a Male Actor in a Supporting Role	The Apprentice	Nominated	

=== BAFTA Awards ===
Year	Category	Nominated work	Result	Ref.
2024	Best Actor in a Supporting Role	The Apprentice	Nominated	

=== Emmy Awards ===
Primetime Emmy Awards
Year	Category	Nominated work	Result	Ref.
2020	Outstanding Lead Actor in a Drama Series	Succession (episode: "This Is Not for Tears")	Won	
2022	Outstanding Lead Actor in a Drama Series	Succession (episode: "Too Much Birthday")	Nominated	
2023	Outstanding Lead Actor in a Drama Series	Succession (episode: "With Open Eyes")	Nominated	

=== Golden Globe Awards ===
Year	Category	Nominated work	Result	Ref.
2021	Best Actor in a Television Series – Drama	Succession (season 3)	Won	
2023	Best Actor in a Television Series – Drama	Succession (season 4)	Nominated	
2024	Best Supporting Actor – Motion Picture	The Apprentice	Nominated	

=== Tony Awards ===
Year	Category	Nominated work	Result	Ref.
2024	Best Actor in a Play	An Enemy of the People	Won	

== Other theatre awards ==
Organizations	Year	Category	Work	Result	Ref.
Broadway.com Audience Awards	2024	Favorite Leading Actor in a Play	An Enemy of the People	Nominated	
Drama League Awards	2024	Distinguished Performance	An Enemy of the People	Nominated	
Lucille Lortel Awards	2008	Outstanding Lead Actor	New Jerusalem	Nominated	
Lucille Lortel Awards	2011	Outstanding Lead Actor	The Coward	Nominated	
Outer Critics Circle Awards	2024	Outstanding Performer in a Broadway Play	An Enemy of the People	Nominated	

== Miscellaneous awards ==
Organizations	Year	Category	Work	Result	Ref.
AACTA Awards	2022	Best Actor in a Series	Succession	Nominated	
Canadian Screen Awards	2025	Best Supporting Performance in a Drama Film	The Apprentice	Won	
Critics' Choice Awards	2020	Best Actor in a Drama Series	Succession (season 2)	Won	
Critics' Choice Awards	2022	Best Actor in a Drama Series	Succession (season 3)	Nominated	
Critics' Choice Awards	2024	Best Actor in a Drama Series	Succession (season 4)	Nominated	
Dorian Awards	2019	TV Performance of the Year – Actor	Succession	Nominated	
Hollywood Critics Association	2023	Best Actor in a Broadcast Network or Cable Series, Drama	Succession	Nominated	
Palm Springs International Film Festival	2015	Ensemble Performance Award	The Big Short	Won	
Santa Barbara International Film Festival	2023	Virtuosos Award	Armageddon Time	Honored	
Satellite Awards	2019	Best Supporting Actor – Television	Succession	Won	
Satellite Awards	2021	Best Actor in a Drama Series	Succession	Nominated	
Satellite Awards	2022	Best Supporting Actor in a Motion Picture	Armageddon Time	Nominated	
Television Critics Association	2020	Individual Achievement in Drama	Succession	Nominated	
Television Critics Association	2022	Individual Achievement in Drama	Succession	Nominated	
Television Critics Association	2023	Individual Achievement in Drama	Succession	Nominated	
