= List of Succession episodes =

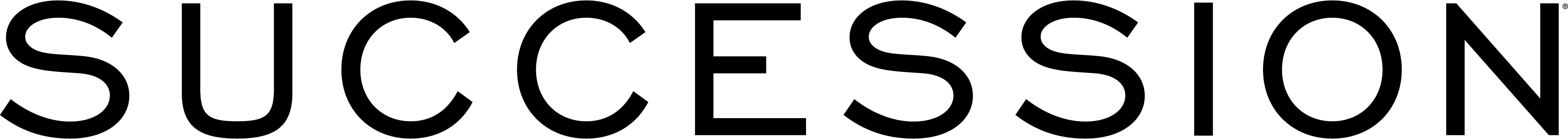
Logo for Succession

Succession is an American satirical comedy-drama television series created by Jesse Armstrong that premiered on HBO on June 3, 2018. The series centers on the Roy family, the owners of global media and entertainment conglomerate Waystar RoyCo, and their fight for control of the company amidst uncertainty about the health of the family's patriarch.

The series stars Brian Cox as Logan Roy, the family patriarch; his children are played by Alan Ruck as Connor, Jeremy Strong as Kendall, Kieran Culkin as Roman, and Sarah Snook as Shiv. Other starring cast members include Matthew Macfadyen as Tom Wambsgans, Shiv's husband and Waystar executive; Nicholas Braun as Greg Hirsch, Logan's grandnephew also employed by the company; and Hiam Abbass as Marcia, Logan's third wife.

During the course of the series, 39 episodes of Succession aired over four seasons, between June 3, 2018, and May 28, 2023.

== Series overview ==
Season	Episodes	Originally released		Average viewership (in millions)
Season	Episodes	First released	Last released	Average viewership (in millions)
1	10	June 3, 2018	August 5, 2018	0.603
2	10	August 11, 2019	October 13, 2019	0.597
3	9	October 17, 2021	December 12, 2021	0.553
4	10	March 26, 2023	May 28, 2023	0.705

== Episodes ==
=== Season 1 (2018) ===
No. overall	No. in season	Title	Directed by	Written by	Original release date	U.S. viewers (millions)
1	1	"Celebration"	Adam McKay	Jesse Armstrong	June 3, 2018	0.582
2	2	"Shit Show at the Fuck Factory"	Mark Mylod	Tony Roche	June 10, 2018	0.491
3	3	"Lifeboats"	Mark Mylod	Jonathan Glatzer	June 17, 2018	0.605
4	4	"Sad Sack Wasp Trap"	Adam Arkin	Anna Jordan	June 24, 2018	0.543
5	5	"I Went to Market"	Adam Arkin	Georgia Pritchett	July 1, 2018	0.583
6	6	"Which Side Are You On?"	Andrij Parekh	Susan Soon He Stanton	July 8, 2018	0.673
7	7	"Austerlitz"	Miguel Arteta	Lucy Prebble	July 15, 2018	0.626
8	8	"Prague"	S. J. Clarkson	Jon Brown	July 22, 2018	0.637
9	9	"Pre-Nuptial"	Mark Mylod	Jesse Armstrong	July 29, 2018	0.558
10	10	"Nobody Is Ever Missing"	Mark Mylod	Jesse Armstrong	August 5, 2018	0.730

=== Season 2 (2019) ===
No. overall	No. in season	Title	Directed by	Written by	Original release date	U.S. viewers (millions)
11	1	"The Summer Palace"	Mark Mylod	Jesse Armstrong	August 11, 2019	0.612
12	2	"Vaulter"	Andrij Parekh	Jon Brown	August 18, 2019	0.603
13	3	"Hunting"	Andrij Parekh	Tony Roche	August 25, 2019	0.607
14	4	"Safe Room"	Shari Springer Berman & Robert Pulcini	Georgia Pritchett	September 1, 2019 (Note: "Safe Room" was first made available on August 30, 2019, through HBO's digital platform.)	0.577
15	5	"Tern Haven"	Mark Mylod	Will Tracy	September 8, 2019	0.507
16	6	"Argestes"	Matt Shakman	Susan Soon He Stanton	September 15, 2019	0.610
17	7	"Return"	Becky Martin	Jonathan Glatzer	September 22, 2019	0.508
18	8	"Dundee"	Kevin Bray	Mary Laws	September 29, 2019	0.579
19	9	"DC"	Mark Mylod	Jesse Armstrong	October 6, 2019	0.705
20	10	"This Is Not for Tears"	Mark Mylod	Jesse Armstrong	October 13, 2019	0.660

=== Season 3 (2021) ===
No. overall	No. in season	Title	Directed by	Written by	Original release date	U.S. viewers (millions)
21	1	"Secession"	Mark Mylod	Jesse Armstrong	October 17, 2021	0.564
22	2	"Mass in Time of War"	Mark Mylod	Jesse Armstrong	October 24, 2021	0.520
23	3	"The Disruption"	Cathy Yan	Ted Cohen & Georgia Pritchett	October 31, 2021	0.405
24	4	"Lion in the Meadow"	Shari Springer Berman & Robert Pulcini	Jon Brown	November 7, 2021	0.484
25	5	"Retired Janitors of Idaho"	Kevin Bray	Tony Roche & Susan Soon He Stanton	November 14, 2021	0.584
26	6	"What It Takes"	Andrij Parekh	Will Tracy	November 21, 2021	0.525
27	7	"Too Much Birthday"	Lorene Scafaria	Georgia Pritchett & Tony Roche	November 28, 2021	0.645
28	8	"Chiantishire"	Mark Mylod	Jesse Armstrong	December 5, 2021	0.613
29	9	"All the Bells Say"	Mark Mylod	Jesse Armstrong	December 12, 2021	0.634

=== Season 4 (2023) ===
No. overall	No. in season	Title	Directed by	Written by	Original release date	U.S. viewers (millions)
30	1	"The Munsters"	Mark Mylod	Jesse Armstrong	March 26, 2023	0.598
31	2	"Rehearsal"	Becky Martin	Tony Roche & Susan Soon He Stanton	April 2, 2023	0.481
32	3	"Connor's Wedding"	Mark Mylod	Jesse Armstrong	April 9, 2023	0.609
33	4	"Honeymoon States"	Lorene Scafaria	Jesse Armstrong & Lucy Prebble	April 16, 2023	0.695
34	5	"Kill List"	Andrij Parekh	Jon Brown & Ted Cohen	April 23, 2023	0.652
35	6	"Living+"	Lorene Scafaria	Georgia Pritchett & Will Arbery	April 30, 2023	0.847
36	7	"Tailgate Party"	Shari Springer Berman & Robert Pulcini	Will Tracy	May 7, 2023	0.739
37	8	"America Decides"	Andrij Parekh	Jesse Armstrong	May 14, 2023	0.746
38	9	"Church and State"	Mark Mylod	Jesse Armstrong	May 21, 2023	0.789
39	10	"With Open Eyes"	Mark Mylod	Jesse Armstrong	May 28, 2023	0.896
