= Michael Tolaydo =

American theater actor of Kenyan origin

- Born: Michael Tolaydo; 23 July 1946 (age 79); Nairobi, Kenya
- Other names: Michael Ellis-Tolaydo
- Occupation: Actor
- Years active: 1976–present

Michael Tolaydo (born 23 July 1946), also as Michael Ellis-Tolaydo, is a Kenyan actor particularly active in American theater.

== Career ==
He was born on 23 July 1946 in Nairobi, Kenya. He started his acting career in theater productions. In his first theater play, he played as one of the policemen in a school production of Arsenic and Old Lace. Then he has been part of several of Motti Lerner's plays directed by Sinai Peter. He permanently moved to DC from NYC in the early 1980s.

He has been nominated for a supporting actor Helen Hayes Award and later received one for ensemble acting. His most notable theater plays include" Equus, The Night Alive, Tribes, Privates on Parade, and Blue Heart. He also acted in the plays, The Admission, Apples from the Desert and New Jerusalem. He was again nominated for the Helen Hayes Award for supporting actor for his role in New Jerusalem. In later years, he continued to dominate in the theater with the plays, The Accident, Benedictus, and The Pangs of the Messiah, Heroes in which he won Helen Hayes Award for Ensemble Acting.

Apart from acting, he is also a Professor Emeritus of Theater, Film, and Media Studies at St. Mary's College of Maryland. After 29 years of teaching career, he retired in May 2016.

== Filmography ==
Year	Film	Role	Genre	Ref.
1976	The Time of Your Life	Drunkard	TV movie	
2005	Triumph at Carville a Tale of Leprosy in America	Narrator	Documentary	
