= Secession (Succession) =

- Succession episode
- Episode no.: Season 3 Episode 1
- Directed by: Mark Mylod
- Written by: Jesse Armstrong
- Cinematography by: Patrick Capone
- Original air date: October 17, 2021
- Running time: 58 minutes

Guest appearances
- Natalie Gold as Rava Roy; Sanaa Lathan as Lisa Arthur; Linda Emond (voice) as Michelle-Anne Vanderhoven; Scott Nicholson as Colin; Juliana Canfield as Jess Jordan; Annabelle Dexter-Jones as Naomi Pierce; Jihae as Berry Schneider; Dasha Nekrasova as Comfry; Jordan Lage as Keith

Episode chronology
← Previous "This Is Not for Tears"	Next → "Mass in Time of War"
- Succession season 3

"Secession" is the third-season premiere of the American satirical comedy-drama television series Succession, and the 21st episode overall. It was written by series creator Jesse Armstrong and directed by Mark Mylod, and originally aired on HBO on October 17, 2021.

The episode picks up immediately from where the second season left off, and follows Kendall and Logan mobilizing their respective sides in preparation for a corporate battle in the wake of Kendall's bombshell press conference.

== Plot ==
Having just publicly named his father responsible for Waystar RoyCo's cover-up of historic sexual misconduct on the company cruise lines, (Note: As depicted in "This Is Not for Tears".) a manic Kendall leaves with Greg and Karolina to mobilize support for his side ahead of the company's shareholder meeting. In the car, Karolina warns Kendall that he has exposed both himself and the company at large to legal action; when she refuses to side with him, Kendall ejects Karolina from the vehicle, leaving her to be swarmed by reporters. On the way to Waystar's offices, Kendall learns that his security clearance has been revoked, and thus decides to set up operations at his ex-wife Rava's apartment. There, he meets with leading public relations strategist Berry Schneider and her assistant Comfry, having hired the two to help steward his public image.

In Europe, Logan and the rest of his children and senior management are taken from their yacht to an airfield to plan. Logan calls Kendall and gives him one chance to recant his statement; when Kendall refuses, Logan resolves to amass support from his allies against his son, including the President of the United States. Gerri attempts to reach out to the White House but is informed by a senior aide that the DOJ cannot afford Waystar any favors. Logan decides to split his inner circle into two camps: he, Tom, Karl, Frank and Hugo depart for Sarajevo in Bosnia (which has no extradition treaty with the U.S.) while Roman, Gerri and Shiv are sent back to New York.

On the aircraft, Logan states that he plans to temporarily step back as CEO and fields opinions on who out of Shiv, Roman and Gerri would be a suitable figurehead. Tom discreetly calls Shiv to inform her of the meeting taking place and has her confirm that she is still interested in leading the company. Shiv soon discovers that Roman and Gerri have also received word of Logan's plans. Kendall places calls to most of Waystar's senior management, hoping to sway more members to his side; Frank listens to his offer of a position inscrutably, while Shiv hangs up on him.

Logan and his team arrive at a hotel in Sarajevo next to the airport. Roman calls Logan bid to forward himself as CEO, while also advocating for Gerri if he fails. Logan immediately responds by telling his team that Roman will not be promoted.

In New York, Shiv meets with Lisa Arthur, an attorney and friend, under the pretense of hiring her to represent Waystar (which Lisa has already declined). Shiv confides to Lisa her conflicting loyalties between Logan, Kendall, and her ambition, asking that Lisa act as her legal advisor; when Lisa refuses, Shiv realizes Kendall has already contacted her, and angrily storms off. On her way to Waystar, Shiv receives a call from Roman informing her that Gerri has been named Waystar's interim CEO, apparently due to Shiv's failure to secure Lisa's services. Shiv decides to change plans and reroutes her vehicle.

Lisa meets with Kendall at Rava's apartment to receive background on his case, preliminary to being formally hired as his attorney. Naomi Pierce arrives at roughly the same time, leading to tensions with Rava. Kendall later calls Logan's side to inform them that he has hired Lisa, Logan has his team hire rival lawyer Layo Upton, opting for an aggressive approach against Kendall.

== Production ==
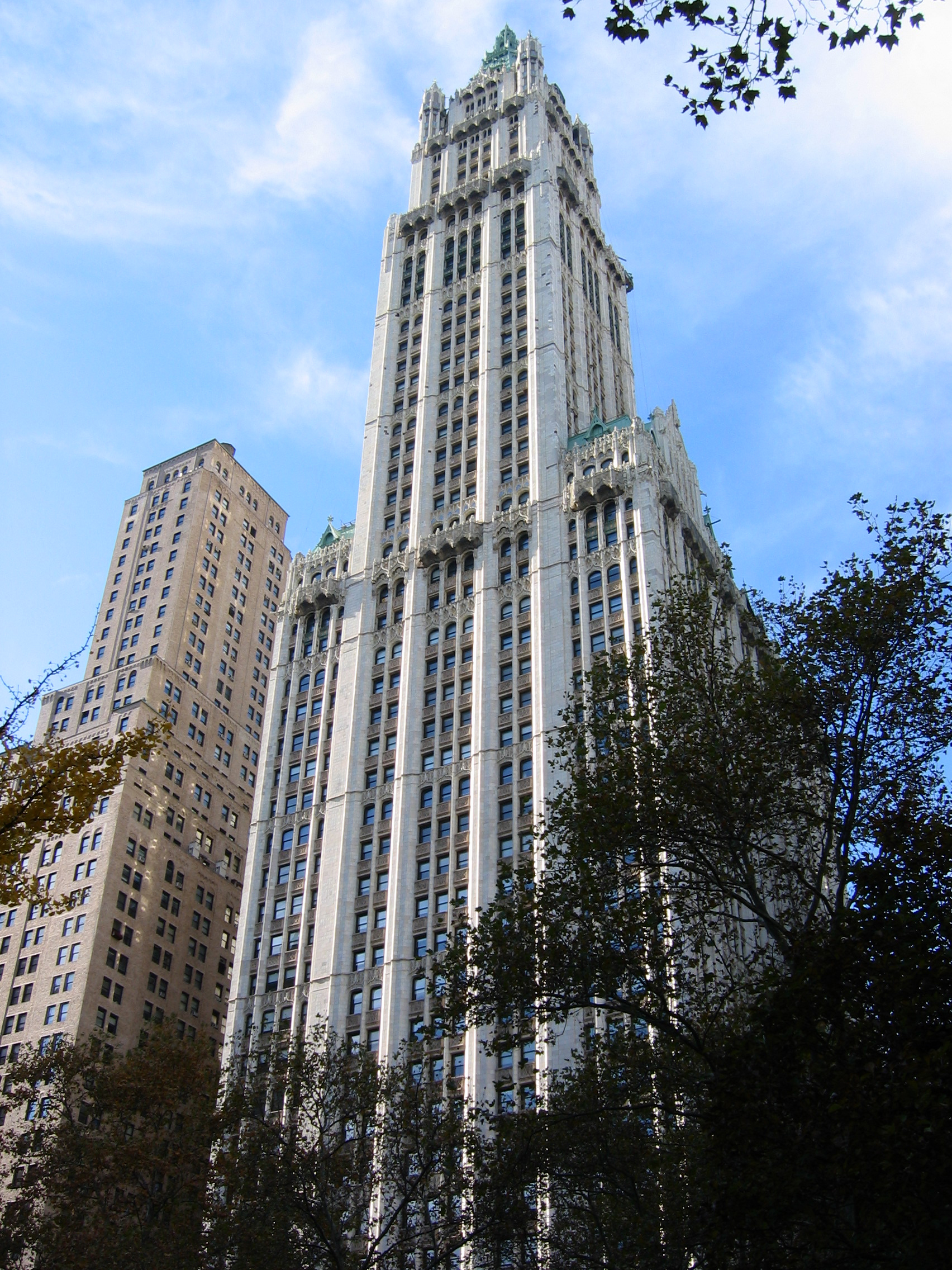
The Woolworth Building was used in season 3 as Rava's apartment.

"Secession" was written by Succession creator and showrunner Jesse Armstrong and directed by Mark Mylod in his ninth episode for the series. Justine Lupe (Willa), David Rasche (Karl), and Fisher Stevens (Hugo) were promoted to series regulars for season 3, and are all credited in the opening titles for the first time in this episode. Conversely, Hiam Abbass, Arian Moayed, and Rob Yang's credits are removed from the title sequence. Natalie Gold, a series regular in the first season, reprises her role of Rava Roy in a guest capacity. Additionally, the episode introduces Sanaa Lathan, Jihae, and Dasha Nekrasova in their respective recurring roles as Lisa Arthur, Berry Schneider, and Comfry, all of whom Kendall hires to his side. Linda Emond makes a voice cameo as White House aide Michelle-Anne Vanderhoven, having also been cast in a recurring role in the season.

Filming for the episode took place in both New York and Europe. The scenes at the airfield were filmed at Florence Airport, with the production renting a Boeing 737 and a Dassault Falcon for the Roys' business jets. Pavilion A of the Woolworth Building in Tribeca was used as Rava's apartment. Scenes set in Sarajevo were filmed in the village of Ellenville, New York, with the Honor's Haven Retreat & Conference—a wellness resort—standing in for the fictional Hotel Clio, where Logan and his executives take refuge. According to executive producer Scott Ferguson, the visual effects team combined footage shot in Tuscany (where the last two episodes of the season were filmed) with exterior shots of Honor's Haven to mimic the appearance of the Balkans.

== Reception ==
=== Ratings ===
Upon airing, the episode was watched by 0.564 million viewers, with an 18-49 rating of 0.12. According to HBO, the episode reached 1.4 million viewers across platforms, making it the most-watched episode of the series thus far.

=== Critical reception ===
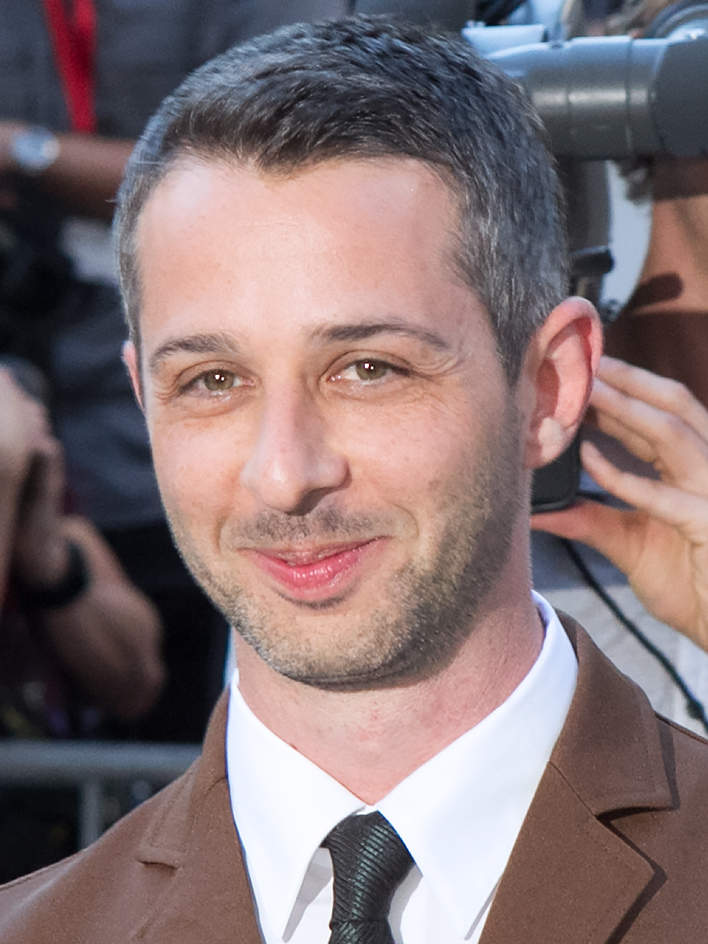
Jeremy Strong's performance in the episode was praised by critics.

"Secession" received largely positive reviews, with critics praising the episode's performances, fast pace, and seamless reintroduction to the series' narrative. Noel Murray of The New York Times was impressed with how much narrative ground the premiere was able to cover in a short span, writing that episode "barrels forward, generating much of its tension and humor from the people who are on the periphery of Logan and Kendall’s feud and are scrambling to keep up." Anita Singh of The Daily Telegraph awarded the episode 5 out of 5 stars, particularly praising Jeremy Strong's performance for "[embodying] all the contradictions of Kendall’s character: the ego, the vulnerability, the recklessness and the self-doubt." Singh also commended Armstrong's writing, remarking that "every line of dialogue is a gem." Scott Tobias of Vulture gave the episode 4 out of 5 stars, praising its humor throughout, as well as its characterization of Kendall following the season 2 finale, writing, "it is hilariously, tragically clear from the beginning that Kendall has not thought any of this through. He seemed to believe that the man who killed the king would also assume the throne."

Some critics took issue with the manner in which the episode reintroduced audiences to the series. Roxana Hadadi of The A.V. Club gave the premiere a B, calling it a "solid introduction into the next chapter of Roy family backstabbing." Hadadi called Strong "excellent at careening between emotional extremes" as Kendall, and praised Sarah Snook and Kieran Culkin's performances as "a master class in fractional degrees of nuance." However, she criticized the script for making the episode feel "a little too self-aware," writing, "it felt like everyone jumped on the Succession train in the past two years. During this episode, it also feels like Armstrong knows that, and is leaning (slightly extraneously) into it. [...] Everything seems amped up in a slightly performative way." Reviewing the third season as a whole, Lucy Mangan of The Guardian declared that the series' writing remains "immaculate," but called the premiere "particularly plot-heavy," stating that it offered "less room for the delicate characterisation that customarily leaven[s] the script and make[s] you wring your hands with [its] deftness and intelligence." Alan Sepinwall of Rolling Stone wrote, "the episode could come off like a bit of narrative throat-clearing. But it’s been so long since we’ve seen these characters... that a slower re-entry into their world is helpful, especially when it’s as typically funny as this one." Sepinwall deemed that the series overall was "in tip-top shape after its lengthy absence."
