= This Is Not for Tears =

- Succession episode
- Episode no.: Season 2 Episode 10
- Directed by: Mark Mylod
- Written by: Jesse Armstrong
- Original air date: October 13, 2019
- Running time: 70 minutes

Guest appearances
- Danny Huston as Jamie Laird; Eric Bogosian as Senator Gil Eavis; Justine Lupe as Willa; Fisher Stevens as Hugo Baker; Annabelle Dexter-Jones as Naomi Pierce; David Rasche as Karl; Angus Wright as Philippe Layton; Ashley Zukerman as Nate Sofrelli; Victor Slezak as Senator Roberts; Juliana Canfield as Jess Jordan

Episode chronology
← Previous "DC"	Next → "Secession"

"This Is Not for Tears" is the tenth and final episode of the second season of the American satirical comedy-drama television series Succession, and the 20th episode overall. It was written by series creator Jesse Armstrong and directed by Mark Mylod, and originally aired on HBO on October 13, 2019.

In the episode, the Roys attempt to decide whom to sacrifice as a public scapegoat in the fallout of a sexual misconduct scandal that has put the future of the company in jeopardy.

"This Is Not for Tears" received universal critical acclaim, with many critics and fans regarding it as the show's best episode and the episode that made Succession a cultural phenomenon. Out of the eighteen Primetime Emmy Award nominations received by the show for its second season, eight were specifically for the episode, which won Outstanding Writing for a Drama Series for Armstrong and Outstanding Lead Actor in a Drama Series for Jeremy Strong's performance as Kendall Roy.

== Plot ==
Greg is called to testify before the Senate regarding the sexual misconduct on Brightstar Cruises. He fumbles his way through questioning from Senator Eavis. Logan watches the testimony in a car with Hugo as they discuss who should be the company's public scapegoat for the scandal. Logan receives a call from an influential Waystar shareholder, who suggests that Logan take responsibility for the crimes.

After the testimony, the Roys spend a holiday on a large yacht in the Mediterranean. Connor and Willa are the first to arrive, and Willa is upset to hear that her recently opened play has been panned by critics. Shiv tells Tom she wants to have a threesome with him and a female yacht employee, though Tom is clearly apprehensive. Kendall soon arrives on the boat with Naomi Pierce and Greg.

Roman, Karl and Laird return from Turkey, having been released by the anti-corruption militia on account of being foreigners. Laird claims to Logan that the deal to secure financing from Eduard Asgarov's family was successful and will allow Waystar to go private, but Roman admits the agreement is likely spurious. Laird, who was seeking to profit off the Turkey deal, reminds the others of the legal consequences if Waystar remains public, and leaves the yacht for the others to resolve the dispute amongst themselves. Connor asks Logan for money to cover the financial loss related to Willa's play as well as numerous other expenses; Logan agrees so long as Connor suspends his presidential campaign. Logan asks Kendall to have Naomi leave the yacht, surmising that she is enabling his drug abuse; before departing, Naomi tells Kendall that Logan only favors him in his broken state.

At breakfast the next day, Logan nonchalantly offers to take the fall for the cruises misconduct, but the others immediately begin debating other options as they gather to the table. Tom's name is suggested by several members, including Shiv, as he oversaw the handling of the relevant documents, though the discussion is inconclusive amidst arguments. Logan and Kendall travel to a Greek island in an attempt to enlist financial aid from Stewy, but he turns them down. While relaxing on a beach, Tom confesses to Shiv that he is unhappy with their marriage and resents how she has treated him. After returning to the yacht, Tom eats a piece of Logan's chicken in defiance, while a reeling Shiv implores Logan not to sacrifice Tom.

Logan finally approaches Kendall and persuades him to bear the public responsibility for the crimes. Kendall asks Logan if he ever saw him fit to run the company, but Logan tells his son that he does not see him as a "killer". A despondent Kendall suggests that he deserves the punishment for the death of Andrew Dodds, though Logan dismisses that incident as a "No Real Person Involved" case. Logan announces his choice at dinner, which shocks the other family members. Logan also appoints Roman as the company's sole COO.

The following morning, Kendall and Greg are flown back to New York to give a press conference, and Greg expresses sympathy for Kendall's situation. As Logan and Shiv watch on television from the yacht, Kendall begins by saying he has been chosen to accept blame for the company's handling of the cruises incidents, but suddenly deviates from his prepared remarks by blaming Logan, calling his father a "malignant presence, a bully, and a liar" and stating that Logan was personally responsible for approving the legal settlements covering up the misconduct. Additionally, he informs the reporters that he has brought documents proving his father's guilt, which Greg has on hand. The speech shocks the reporters, Karolina, and the rest of the Roy family, including Logan, whose initial surprise gradually gives way to a faint smile.

== Production ==
=== Writing ===
"This Is Not for Tears" was written by Succession showrunner Jesse Armstrong and directed by Mark Mylod in his eighth episode for the series. Like the first season's finale, the title of the episode derives from the poem "Dream Song 29" in John Berryman's The Dream Songs.

According to series star Brian Cox, the ending of the episode is meant to serve as a culmination of Logan's relationship with his children, particularly Kendall. In an interview with Deadline Hollywood, Cox said, "these are entitled children who've had everything done for them, and they need to be schooled on the harsh realities of business... [Logan]'s testing his children to see if they have the mettle in them, and for a lot of the episodes, the mettle is not clear. Logan does love his children, but at the same time, it's all about their worth in terms of the company." Armstrong has stated that he left the ending open to interpretation.

=== Filming ===
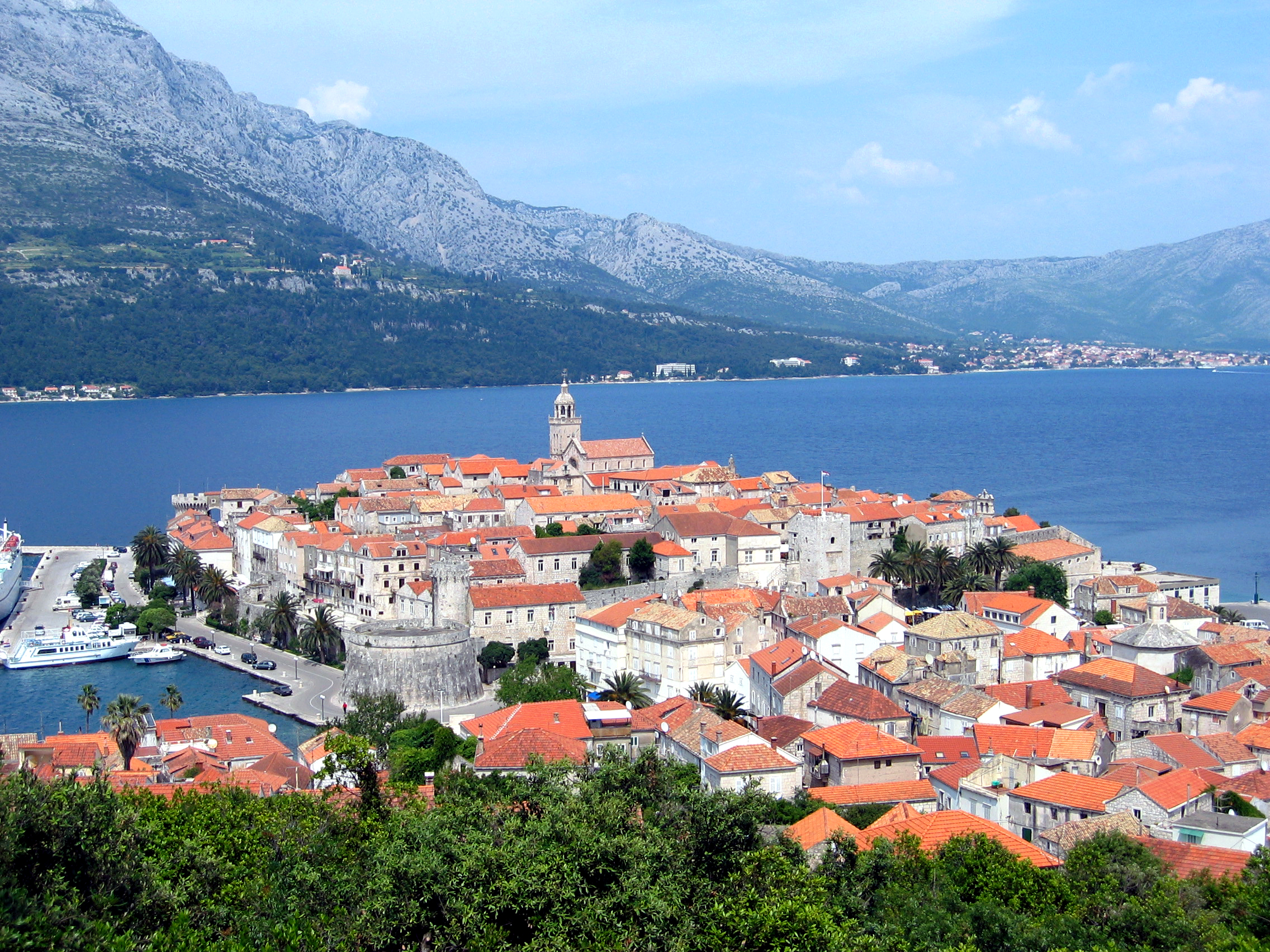
Filming for the episode primarily took place in Korčula, Croatia.

The majority of the episode was shot on the Solandge, a 279-foot luxury yacht that initially launched in 2013. Armstrong stated in an interview that the decision to film the episode on a yacht mirrored the real-life history of media moguls like Robert Maxwell conducting important meetings on family yachts. Mylod characterized the yacht setting as "the ultimate gilded cage to trap these characters in," and noted that it embodied the metaphor of "throwing one of [the characters] overboard." The director recounted that the production was initially aiming to rent a less expensive yacht given the challenges of obtaining one of the caliber shown in the episode, and credited HBO with providing the requisite funding to charter the Solandge. The yacht scenes were filmed in the Adriatic Sea around Cavtat, near Dubrovnik, Croatia.

== Reception ==
=== Ratings ===
Upon airing, the episode was watched by 0.66 million American viewers, with an 18-49 rating of 0.17.

=== Critical reception ===
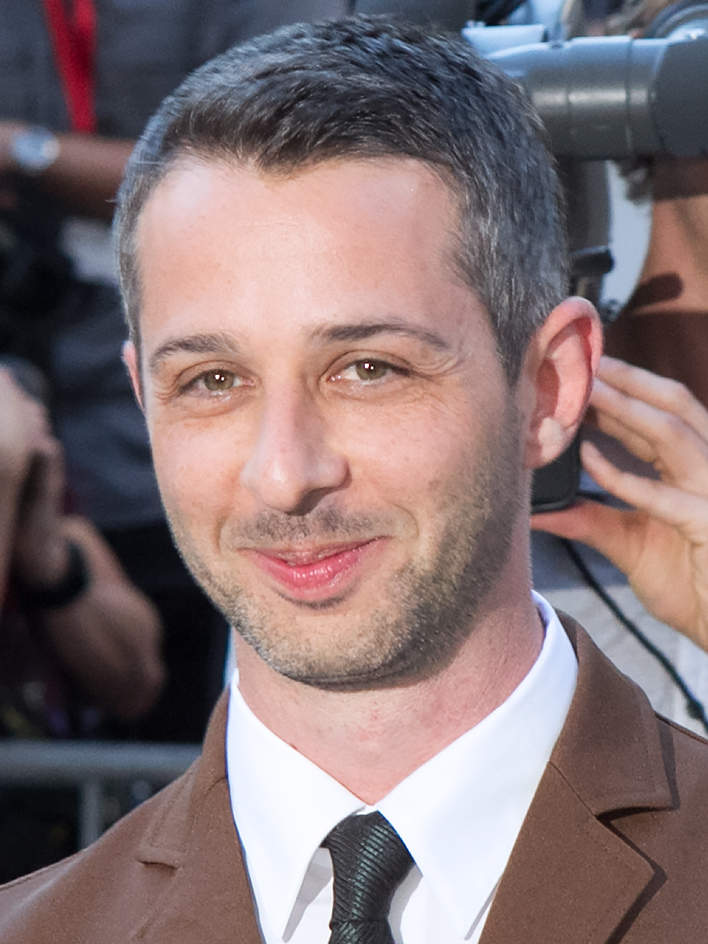
Jeremy Strong won the Primetime Emmy Award for Outstanding Lead Actor in a Drama Series for his performance in "This Is Not for Tears."

"This Is Not for Tears" was universally acclaimed by critics, who praised Armstrong's writing, Mylod's direction, Jeremy Strong's performance and the twist ending. On Rotten Tomatoes, the episode has a rating of 100% based on 15 reviews, with the critics' consensus stating, "Guided by Jeremy Strong's brilliant performance, series creator Jesse Armstrong reverses course and delivers a seriously satisfying season finale in "This Is Not for Tears.""

Sophie Gilbert of The Atlantic felt the episode was the series' "most gorgeous episode to date" due to the location choices, describing Mylod's direction as having the "visual poetry and psychosexual familial tension of a late Bertolucci movie, or one by Luca Guadagnino." Randall Colburn of The A.V. Club gave the episode an A−, praising Strong and Cox's performances and the satisfying payoff of the arc between Logan and Kendall. However, Colburn was less positive about Tom's resolution, calling it the episode's "only sketchy moment." Noel Murray of The New York Times wrote, "this jaw-dropper ending works because the writer Jesse Armstrong sets it up superbly, beginning with that long scene when everybody debates — with hilariously exaggerated politeness — the matter of whose body might best fit under a bus." Murray compared the family negotiation scene to an episode of Survivor, calling it "a fascinating study of human nature as these people try to save their jobs — and their senses of self — with a combination of strategic shade-throwing and personal appeals."

Sean T. Collins of Decider, who had remained skeptical of the season and the series at large compared to other critics, nonetheless reserved high praise for "This Is Not for Tears," declaring it "a high point not just for the episode or the season but the entire series." Collins felt that the episode deftly balanced comedy and drama despite his misgivings about the dramedy genre, and remarked: "The best thing about the finale... isn’t just the catharsis of watching one of Logan’s emotionally abused children (albeit one who committed vehicular homicide) strike back — it’s the show’s apparent recognition that actor Jeremy Strong is the best weapon in its arsenal." David Stubbs of The Guardian felt that with the finale, Armstrong has "shown that a series can not only survive but thrive without likeable, moral and sympathetic characters. And even find a way of making us care for them."

=== Accolades ===
At the 72nd Primetime Emmy Awards, Jeremy Strong won Outstanding Lead Actor in a Drama Series and Jesse Armstrong won Outstanding Writing for a Drama Series for the episode. Additionally, Mark Mylod was nominated for Outstanding Directing for a Drama Series, and Matthew Macfadyen and Nicholas Braun selected the episode to support their nominations in the categories of Outstanding Supporting Actor in a Drama Series. Furthermore, at the 72nd Primetime Creative Arts Emmy Awards, "This Is Not for Tears" received nominations for Stephen H. Carter, Carmen Cardenas, George DeTitta, and Ana Buljan in the category Outstanding Production Design for a Narrative Contemporary Program (One Hour or More); Bill Henry and Venya Bruk in the category Outstanding Single-Camera Picture Editing for a Drama Series (which it won); and Nicholas Britell in the category Outstanding Music Composition for a Series.
