= Defiance (play) =

Play written by John Patrick Shanley

- Written by: John Patrick Shanley
- Original language: English

Premiere
- Date premiered: February 9, 2006
- Place premiered: Manhattan Theatre Club

Defiance is a play by American playwright John Patrick Shanley. It ran Off-Broadway from February 9, 2006, to June 4, 2006.

== Background ==
Defiance is the second of three plays of a planned trilogy. Shanley explained that the trilogy "explores specifics of my life story as it overlaps with major changes in the social fabric of this country." Shanley had military duty at Camp Lejeune from 1970 to 1972.

Shanley said "In short, Doubt turned into Defiance, which is my second play about American hierarchy".

== Plot ==
The play concerns a colonel who promotes a black officer solely based on race. The black officer finds out that the colonel has had a brief affair with a private's wife, and he is torn between his desire to go unnoticed and his realization that he must do the right thing.

== Productions ==
The play premiered Off-Broadway at the Manhattan Theatre Club's City Center Stage I on February 9 (in previews), 2006. Directed by Doug Hughes, the cast featured Stephen Lang, Chris Chalk, Margaret Colin and Chris Bauer. The play closed on June 4, 2006. It received a Henry Hewes Design Award nomination for Costumes design by Catherine Zuber.

The play was produced at the Pasadena Playhouse in Pasadena, California, running from January 12, 2007 to February 18. Directed by Andrew J. Robinson, the cast featured Kevin Kilner and Jordan Baker.
