= Armageddon Time =

2022 film by James Gray

- Theatrical release poster
- Directed by: James Gray
- Written by: James Gray
- Produced by: Anthony Katagas; Marc Butan; Rodrigo Teixiera
- Starring: Anne Hathaway; Jeremy Strong; Banks Repeta; Jaylin Webb; Anthony Hopkins
- Cinematography: Darius Khondji
- Edited by: Scott Morris
- Music by: Christopher Spelman
- Production companies: RT Features; MadRiver Pictures; Keep Your Head; Spacemaker Productions
- Distributed by: Focus Features (United States); Universal Pictures (International)
- Release dates: May 19, 2022 (Cannes); October 28, 2022 (United States)
- Running time: 115 minutes
- Country: United States
- Language: English
- Budget: $15 million
- Box office: $6.6 million

Armageddon Time is a 2022 American coming-of-age drama film written, directed, and produced by James Gray. The film stars Anne Hathaway, Jeremy Strong, Banks Repeta, Jaylin Webb, and Anthony Hopkins. Inspired by Gray's childhood experiences, the story follows a young Jewish-American boy who befriends an African-American classmate and begins to struggle with his family's expectations and growing up in a time of inequality and prejudice. It was shot in New Jersey and Fresh Meadows, Queens, where Gray grew up.

Armageddon Time had its world premiere at the 2022 Cannes Film Festival on May 19, 2022, and was released in the United States via a limited theatrical release on October 28, 2022, by Focus Features, before expanding wide on November 4. It received positive reviews from critics, but grossed just $6 million against a production budget of $15 million.

== Plot ==
In 1980 Queens, New York City, on his first day in sixth grade, Jewish-American Paul Graff becomes friends with a rebellious African-American classmate, Johnny Davis. Johnny was held back by a year and gets harsher treatment from their teacher when they both joke around in class. Paul often disengages from his schoolwork and draws pictures instead.

Paul lives with his financially stable family. He is close with his maternal grandfather, Aaron Rabinowitz, who encourages him to pursue his aspiration to become an artist. His well-meaning but strict parents, Esther and Irving, are less convinced of Paul's career prospects as an artist. At night, Aaron tells Paul the story of how Aaron's mother escaped antisemitic persecution in Ukraine, fleeing to London before eventually emigrating to the U.S. with Aaron and her British husband.

One day, Paul and Johnny are caught smoking a joint in the restrooms, unaware that it's an illegal drug. Furious, Esther allows Irving to beat Paul as punishment. In the hope that he becomes more disciplined, Paul is sent to the Forest Manor Prep private school by his parents, where his older brother Ted is studying. Meanwhile, Johnny stops going to school after being relegated to special education.

Forest Manor is financially supported by famous businessman Fred Trump, who also supports Ronald Reagan in the upcoming presidential election. Many of the students are also Reagan supporters. On Paul's first day, Fred's daughter Maryanne, one of the school's famous alumni, gives a speech to the students about working to earn their success. Paul sees the school's advantages over his previous school but doesn't feel welcome. He is also unnerved by other students' racist comments when Johnny meets with him during recess. Johnny begins living in secret at Paul's clubhouse, having nowhere to go other than living with his sick grandmother, where foster system workers searching for Johnny have begun to visit regularly.

While playing at the park on the weekend, Paul tells Aaron of his struggles at school and how he did nothing when he witnessed racism. Aaron encourages Paul to stand up against prejudice when he sees it, reminding him that while antisemitism still covertly persists, he and his family still have the privilege of being white. Shortly after, Aaron dies of bone cancer, with the family mourning his loss.

Tired of living under high expectations from family and school, as well as the unfair treatment of Johnny, Paul convinces Johnny to steal a computer from school and sell it so they can run away together. After stealing the computer, they are arrested for trying to pawn it. While being interrogated, Paul confesses that it was all his plan. But knowing that he has no options in life, Johnny takes the blame to let Paul go, much to Paul's dismay. Paul and Johnny bid farewell, as Irving arrives to take him home with no consequences because Irving once did the interrogating officer a favor. At home, Irving confesses to Paul that he is sympathetic to his frustration with America's unfair racial inequality, but tells him that they need to survive to have a good life. The two agree to not tell Esther what happened, as she is still mourning her father.

Days later, the Graff family are disappointed by Reagan's victory in the election, while Paul is focused on schoolwork. During a Thanksgiving dance at school, Fred Trump addresses the students, expressing hope that they'll become the next successful elite. A disillusioned Paul leaves during the speech.

== Cast ==
- Banks Repeta as Paul Graff
- Anne Hathaway as Esther Graff, Paul's mother and Aaron's daughter
- Jeremy Strong as Irving Graff, Paul's father
- Jaylin Webb as Johnny Davis, Paul's African-American friend and public school classmate
- Anthony Hopkins as Aaron Rabinowitz, Paul's grandfather
- Tovah Feldshuh as Mickey Rabinowitz, Paul's grandmother and Aaron's wife
- Ryan Sell as Ted Graff, Paul's older brother
- John Diehl as Fred Trump, a famous businessman and financier of Forest Manor Prep private school
- Jessica Chastain as Maryanne Trump, Fred's daughter
- Andrew Polk as Mr. Turkeltaub, Paul and Johnny's public school teacher
- Teddy Coluca as Uncle Louis, Paul's uncle
- Marcia Haufrecht as Aunt Ruth, Paul's aunt
- Dane Zagarino (aka Dane West) as Topper Lowell, Paul's friend at Forest Manor
- Richard Bekins as Forest Manor Headmaster Fitzroy
- Domenick Lombardozzi as Police Sergeant D'Arienzo
- Marcia Jean Kurtz as Forest Manor Student Guide
- Landon James Forlenza as Chad Eastman, Topper's friend
- Eva Jette Putrello as Veronika Bronfman, a Forest Manor student
- Jacob MacKinnon as Edgar Romanelli, a public school student

== Production ==
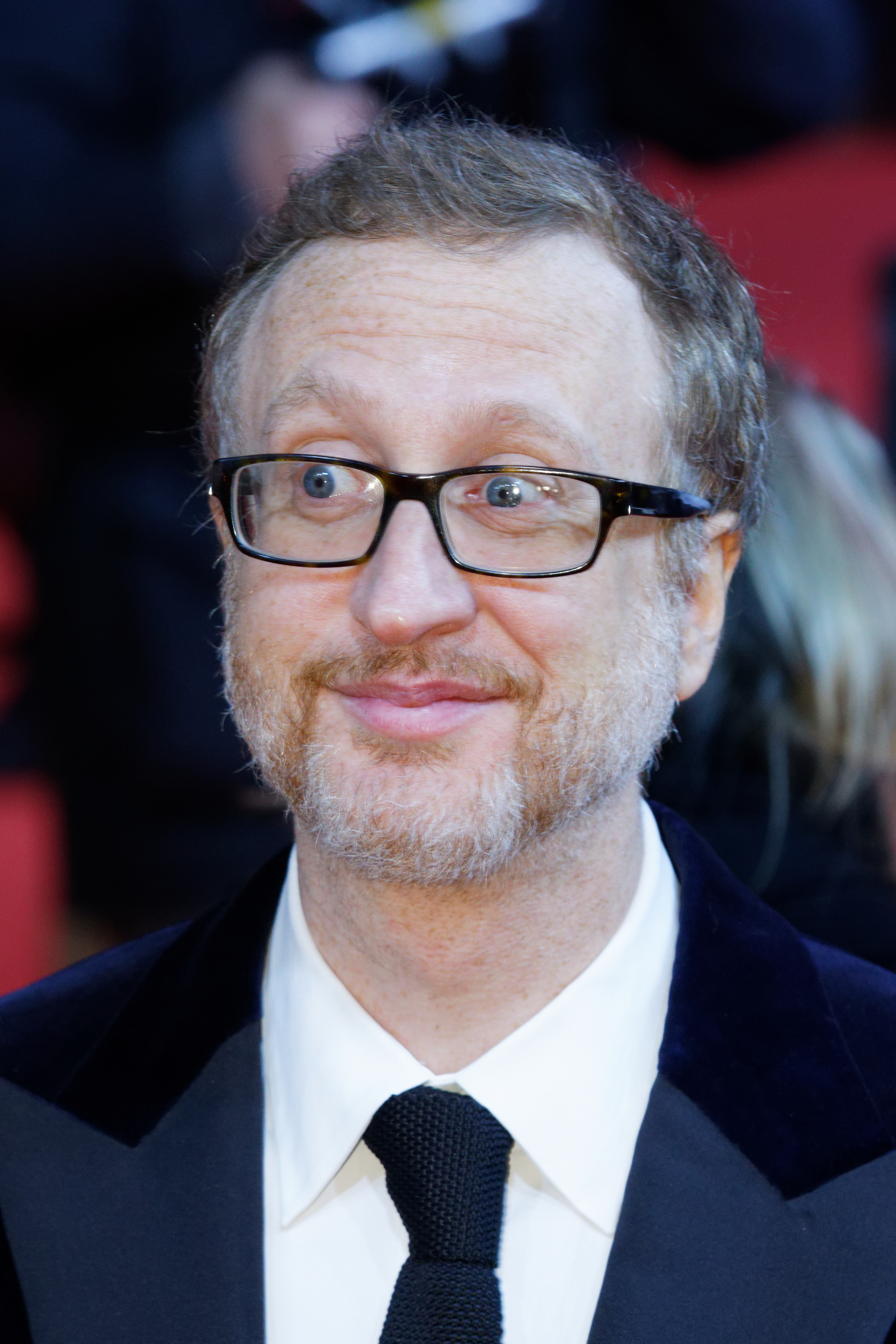
Writer, director, and producer James Gray

On May 16, 2019, Variety reported that James Gray would write and direct Armageddon Time, a film based on his upbringing in Queens, New York. Cate Blanchett was cast in May 2020, with Gray saying she would shoot all her scenes in three days, including a long monologue. The next month, Robert De Niro, Oscar Isaac, Donald Sutherland, and Anne Hathaway were added to the cast, with plans to film in New York City once the effects of the COVID-19 pandemic were minimal.

Filming began in October 2021 in New Jersey. It was initially expected to start in early 2021. In October, it was reported that Anthony Hopkins and Jeremy Strong would also star alongside newcomers Banks Repeta, Jaylin Webb, and Ryan Sell, with Hopkins and Strong replacing De Niro and Isaac, respectively. Production wrapped in December 2021, and Andrew Polk and Tovah Feldshuh were confirmed to star. Domenick Lombardozzi was revealed as part of the cast in March 2022. Jessica Chastain was later revealed to have replaced Blanchett in a cameo role.

The title comes from The Clash's song "Armagideon Time", which is heard several times in the film.

== Release ==
The film premiered at the 2022 Cannes Film Festival on May 19, 2022, where it received a seven-minute standing ovation. It began a limited release in the U.S. on October 28, 2022, before expanding nationwide on November 4. It was distributed in the U.S. by Focus Features and internationally by Universal Pictures.

Armageddon Time was released on VOD platforms on November 22, 2022, followed by release on home media (Blu-ray and DVD) on January 3, 2023, by Universal Pictures Home Entertainment and Studio Distribution Services.

== Reception ==
=== Box office ===
The film grossed $1.9 million domestically and $4.7 million internationally, for a worldwide total of $6.5 million. Sources such as Variety attributed this performance to poor marketing, a mixed audience reception and the general public losing interest in supporting prestige films in favor of MCU franchise and horror films in a movie-going environment altered by the pandemic.

Gray called the film's financial performance a "failure" and warned that films of its kind would continue to fail commercially, adding,

You're now in a situation where literally every single one of these [non-franchise] movies is not doing well, and in some ways, that's the great equalizer ... But you also know as a film person that has absolutely no bearing on the long-term reaction to a film. I'm a film person, and I have no idea what the box office receipts were of, you know, A Clockwork Orange or something. So I try to divorce myself from that as well. Because I can't do anything about it.

=== Critical response ===
On the review aggregator website Rotten Tomatoes, 76% of 229 critics' reviews are positive, with an average rating of 6.8/10. The website's consensus reads: "Armageddon Time finds writer-director James Gray excavating his own past and returning with a well-acted drama refreshingly free of nostalgia." Metacritic, which uses a weighted average, assigned a score of 74 out of 100 based on 54 critics, indicating "generally favorable" reviews.

Filmmaker Alexander Payne praised the film, saying "James' film is about himself and his family, but I saw myself and my own struggles with myself and with family. I heard echoes of myself in the choices I made as a kid and continue to make as I stumble my way through life. But no matter how maladroit the actions of his characters, James Gray paints them with compassion and understanding. Understanding — what else is there? We're not bad people. We're just doing it all for the first time."

In June 2025, IndieWire ranked the film at number 17 on its list of "The 100 Best Movies of the 2020s (So Far)."

Nell Minow of RogerEbert.com gave the film 2.5/4 stars, noting that some of the characters felt like caricatures and that Johnny's character was underwritten. Owen Gleiberman from Variety also critiqued how Johnny's character is only there to serve as a lesson for Paul and does not get an appropriate ending for his amount of screentime.

=== Accolades ===
Award or film festival	Date of ceremony	Category	Recipient(s)	Result	Ref.
AARP Movies for Grownups Awards	28 January 2023	Best Intergenerational Film	Armageddon Time	Nominated	
AARP Movies for Grownups Awards	28 January 2023	Best Time Capsule	Armageddon Time	Nominated	
Cannes Film Festival	28 May 2022	Palme d'Or	James Gray	Nominated	
Critics' Choice Awards	15 January 2023	Best Young Actor/Actress	Banks Repeta	Nominated	
Casting Society of America	9 March 2023	Studio or Independent Feature – Drama	Douglas Aibel and Matthew Glasner	Nominated	
Gijón International Film Festival	19 November 2022	Best Film	James Gray	Nominated	
Gotham Independent Film Awards	28 November 2022	Best Screenplay	James Gray	Nominated	
Guild of Music Supervisors Awards	5 March 2023	Best Music Supervision for Film Budgeted Under 25 Million Dollars	Joe Rudge	Nominated	
Las Vegas Film Critics Society	11 December 2022	Best Male Youth Performance (Under 21)	Banks Repeta	Nominated	
Music City Film Critics Association	9 January 2023	Best Young Actor	Banks Repeta	Nominated	
National Board of Review	8 December 2022	Top Ten Independent Films	Armageddon Time	Won	
National Society of Film Critics	7 January 2023	Best Screenplay	James Gray	Runner-up	
Portland Critics Association Awards	16 January 2023	Best Actor in a Supporting Role	Anthony Hopkins	Nominated	
San Diego Film Critics Society Awards	6 January 2023	Best Youth Performance (Under 16)	Jaylin Webb	Won	
San Diego Film Critics Society Awards	6 January 2023	Best Youth Performance (Under 16)	Banks Repeta	Runner-up (tied)	
San Francisco Bay Area Film Critics Circle	9 January 2023	Best Supporting Actor	Anthony Hopkins	Nominated	
Santa Barbara International Film Festival	February 10, 2023	Virtuoso Award	Jeremy Strong	Won	
Satellite Awards	3 March 2023	Best Actor in a Supporting Role	Jeremy Strong	Nominated	
Seattle Film Critics Society	17 January 2023	Best Youth Performance	Banks Repeta	Nominated	
Washington D.C. Area Film Critics Association	12 December 2022	Best Youth Performance	Banks Repeta	Nominated	

== See also ==
- Liberty Heights
