= Succession (TV series) =

American television series (2018–2023)

- Genre: Black comedy; Comedy-drama; Family drama; Political satire; Tragicomedy
- Created by: Jesse Armstrong
- Showrunner: Jesse Armstrong
- Starring: Hiam Abbass; Nicholas Braun; Brian Cox; Kieran Culkin; Peter Friedman; Natalie Gold; Matthew Macfadyen; Alan Ruck; Sarah Snook; Jeremy Strong; Rob Yang; Dagmara Domińczyk; Arian Moayed; J. Smith-Cameron; Justine Lupe; David Rasche; Fisher Stevens; Alexander Skarsgård
- Music by: Nicholas Britell
- Opening theme: "Succession (Main Title Theme)"
- Country of origin: United States
- Original language: English
- No. of seasons: 4
- No. of episodes: 39 (list of episodes)

Production
- Executive producers: Jesse Armstrong; Will Ferrell; Adam McKay; Frank Rich; Kevin Messick; Mark Mylod; Jane Tranter; Georgia Pritchett; Tony Roche; Scott Ferguson; Jon Brown; Lucy Prebble; Will Tracy
- Producers: Regina Heyman; Dara Schnapper; Jonathan Filley; Ron Bozman; Gabrielle Mahon
- Production locations: United States; England (seasons 1–2); Iceland (season 2); Croatia (season 2); Scotland (season 2); Italy (season 3); Norway (season 4); Barbados (season 4)
- Cinematography: Andrij Parekh; Patrick Capone; Christopher Norr; Katelin Arizmendi
- Editors: Mark Yoshikawa; Ken Eluto; Jane Rizzo; Anne McCabe; Joe Giganti; Suzy Elmiger; William Henry; Ellen Tam; Brian A. Kates
- Camera setup: Single camera
- Running time: 56–88 minutes
- Production companies: HBO Entertainment; Gary Sanchez Productions; Hyperobject Industries (season 2–4); Hot Seat Productions (season 4); Project Zeus

Original release
- Network: HBO
- Release: June 3, 2018 – May 28, 2023

Succession is an American satirical comedy-drama television series created by English screenwriter Jesse Armstrong that aired for four seasons on HBO from June 3, 2018, to May 28, 2023. The series centers on the Roy family, the owners of global media and entertainment conglomerate Waystar RoyCo, and their fight for control of the company amidst uncertainty about the health of the family's patriarch.

Brian Cox portrays the family patriarch Logan Roy. His children are played by Alan Ruck as Connor, Jeremy Strong as Kendall, Kieran Culkin as Roman, and Sarah Snook as Shiv. Other starring cast members are Matthew Macfadyen as Tom Wambsgans, Shiv's husband and Waystar executive; Nicholas Braun as Greg Hirsch, Logan's grandnephew also employed by the company; Hiam Abbass as Marcia, Logan's third wife; and Peter Friedman as Frank Vernon, a longtime confidant of Logan; while Dagmara Domińczyk, Arian Moayed, J. Smith-Cameron, Justine Lupe, David Rasche, Fisher Stevens, and Alexander Skarsgård featured in recurring roles before being promoted to the main cast.

Succession received universal critical acclaim for its writing, acting, humor, musical score, directing, production values, and examination of its subject matter. Many critics and publications have named the show one of the greatest television series of all time. The series has received several accolades, including three wins each for the Golden Globe for Best Television Series – Drama and the Primetime Emmy for Outstanding Drama Series in 2020, 2022 and 2023 as well as the British Academy Television Award for Best International Programme. Culkin, Cox and Strong each won Golden Globe Award for Best Actor – Television Series Drama for their performances, and Culkin and Strong won the Primetime Emmy Award for Outstanding Lead Actor in a Drama Series. Snook and Macfadyen both also won Emmy Awards: for Lead Actress and Supporting Actor respectively, with Macfadyen winning twice. Armstrong also won four Emmys and a BAFTA for his writing.

== Premise ==
Succession follows the Roy family, which owns the New York City-based global media conglomerate Waystar RoyCo. The family patriarch, Logan Roy, has experienced a decline in health. His four children—estranged oldest son Connor (Ruck), power-hungry Kendall (Strong), irreverent Roman (Culkin), and politically savvy Shiv (Snook)—who all have varying degrees of connection to the company begin to prepare for a future without their father and vie for prominence within the company.

== Cast and characters ==
- Hiam Abbass as Marcia Roy (seasons 1–2 and 4; (Note: Credited when appearing.) recurring season 3): Logan's third and current wife. Born and raised in Beirut, she is often at odds with Logan's mistrustful children. She has a son, Amir, from her first marriage and a daughter from a previous relationship.
- Nicholas Braun as Greg Hirsch: the bumbling yet opportunistic grandson of Logan's brother Ewan. Greg is unfamiliar with the rough terrain he must navigate to win Logan over, and finds himself indentured to Tom Wambsgans in his quest for a place at Waystar.
- Brian Cox as Logan Roy: the Dundee-born billionaire, born into poverty before establishing the media and entertainment conglomerate Waystar RoyCo. He is a brash leader whose primary focus is his company, rather than his four children: Connor from his first marriage and Kendall, Roman, and Siobhan from his second marriage. He is married to Marcia, his third wife.
- Kieran Culkin as Roman Roy: half-brother to Connor and the middle child from Logan's second marriage. Roman is immature, does not take responsibilities seriously and often finds himself lacking the common sense his father requires of him. He is frequently at odds with his older brother Kendall and sometimes his sister Shiv, with whom he often vies for power and their father's attention.
- Peter Friedman as Frank Vernon: COO and later vice-chairman of Waystar RoyCo, and longtime confidant of Logan. Frank is a member of Logan's old guard, on whom Kendall frequently relies to help win back Logan's favor. He is Kendall's mentor and godfather, and is disliked by Roman.
- Natalie Gold as Rava Roy (season 1; recurring seasons 3–4): Kendall's former wife and mother of their two children.
- Matthew Macfadyen as Tom Wambsgans: Shiv's fiancé and then her husband. Tom is a Waystar executive who is promoted from head of the amusement park and cruise division to running ATN, the company's global news outlet. He enjoys his proximity to the Roy family's power, but is frequently dismissed by the family's inner circle. He ingratiates himself with those more powerful than he, but torments his hapless subordinate Greg.
- Alan Ruck as Connor Roy: the only child from Logan's first marriage. Mostly removed from corporate affairs, he defers to his half-siblings on most firm-related matters and resides at a ranch in New Mexico with his younger girlfriend Willa. He is prone to delusions of grandeur and "had an interest in politics from a young age." Similar to his half-siblings, Connor does not have the best recollections of his childhood, as he mentioned that he went three years without seeing Logan when he was a child.
- Sarah Snook as Siobhan "Shiv" Roy: Logan's youngest child and only daughter. A left-leaning political fixer, she worked for a time for presidential candidate Gil Eavis, whose political views clash with Waystar. She eventually leaves politics to focus on building a future at Waystar. She is engaged to and then marries Tom, but their relationship is undermined by Shiv's infidelity.
- Jeremy Strong as Kendall Roy: the younger half-brother of Connor and the eldest child from Logan's second marriage. As Logan's heir apparent, Kendall struggles to prove his worth to his father after botching major deals and battling substance abuse. He toils to maintain a relationship with his siblings, as well as his ex-wife Rava and their children.
- Rob Yang as Lawrence Yee (seasons 1–2): the founder of media website Vaulter that is acquired by Waystar RoyCo. He holds great contempt for Waystar and particularly Kendall, with whom he is often at odds.
- Dagmara Domińczyk as Karolina Novotney (seasons 2–4; recurring season 1): the head of public relations for Waystar RoyCo and a member of the company's legal team.
- Arian Moayed as Stewy Hosseini (seasons 2 and 4; recurring seasons 1 and 3): Kendall's friend from the Buckley School and Harvard who is now a private equity investor with a seat on Waystar's board. He is covertly in partnership with Logan's rival Sandy Furness.
- J. Smith-Cameron as Gerri Kellman (seasons 2–4; recurring season 1): the general counsel to Waystar RoyCo, who is also godmother to Shiv. She becomes a mentor figure to Roman, with whom she also shares a secret sexual connection.
- Justine Lupe as Willa Ferreyra (seasons 3–4; recurring seasons 1–2): Connor's girlfriend, and later wife, who is younger than him, is a former call girl and an aspiring playwright.
- David Rasche as Karl Muller (seasons 3–4; recurring seasons 1–2): Waystar RoyCo's CFO and member of the company's legal team.
- Fisher Stevens as Hugo Baker (seasons 3–4; recurring season 2): a senior communications executive for Parks and Cruises in charge of managing a scandal involving Brightstar cruise lines.
- Alexander Skarsgård as Lukas Matsson (season 4; recurring season 3): the Swedish CEO of streaming media giant GoJo who is looking to buy Waystar RoyCo.

== Episodes ==
Season	Episodes	Originally released		Average viewership (in millions)
Season	Episodes	First released	Last released	Average viewership (in millions)
1	10	June 3, 2018	August 5, 2018	0.603
2	10	August 11, 2019	October 13, 2019	0.597
3	9	October 17, 2021	December 12, 2021	0.553
4	10	March 26, 2023	May 28, 2023	0.705

== Production ==
=== Development ===
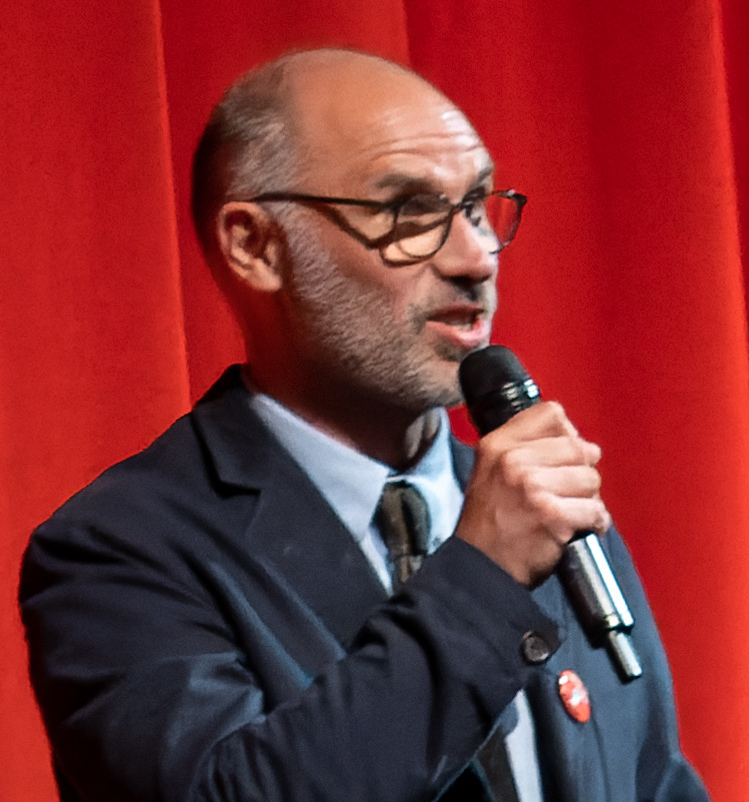
Series creator and showrunner Jesse Armstrong

Showrunner Jesse Armstrong initially conceived the series as a feature film about the Murdoch family, but the script never went into production. Armstrong eventually expanded the scope of the story to include the larger landscape of Wall Street, which he felt better suited a television format. Armstrong wrote a new script centered on original characters loosely inspired by various powerful media families such as the Murdochs, the Redstones, the Maxwells, and the Sulzbergers. On June 6, 2016, it was announced that HBO had given the production a pilot order. The episode was written by Armstrong and directed by Adam McKay. Executive producers for the pilot include Armstrong, McKay, Will Ferrell, Frank Rich, and Kevin Messick. On May 16, 2017, it was announced that HBO had given the production a series order for a first season consisting of ten episodes. The previously announced creative team continued their involvement as the series entered into production. (Note: Attributed to multiple sources:)

On April 26, 2018, it was announced that the series would premiere on June 3, 2018. On June 11, 2018, HBO renewed the series for a second season. On May 23, 2019, it was announced that the second season would premiere on August 11, 2019. On August 20, 2019, HBO renewed the series for a third season. On March 28, 2020, HBO announced the third season's production was delayed due to the COVID-19 pandemic. The third season premiered on October 17, 2021. In June 2021, executive producer Georgia Pritchett commented that the series would not go beyond five seasons, and possibly would end after season four. On October 26, 2021, HBO renewed the series for a fourth season which premiered on March 26, 2023. In an interview with The New Yorker in February 2023, Armstrong confirmed that the series would conclude with the fourth season. He stated that while the season was not initially pitched as the series' last, "the decision to end solidified through the writing and even when we started filming: I said to the cast, 'I'm not a hundred percent sure, but I think this is it.'" Before filming the fourth season, Armstrong had ideas for a fifth season, but ultimately decided to end the series after finishing the table read for the series finale.

=== Casting ===
On October 6, 2016, it was announced that Brian Cox, Jeremy Strong, Kieran Culkin, Sarah Snook, Nicholas Braun, and Matthew Macfadyen had been cast in lead roles in the series' pilot. On November 4, 2016, it was announced that Hiam Abbass, Alan Ruck, Rob Yang, Parker Sawyers, and Peter Friedman had also joined the main cast of the pilot. On January 24, 2018, it was reported that Ashley Zukerman had joined the series in a recurring role. On May 21, 2019, Holly Hunter joined the cast in a recurring role in the second season.

In January 2021, it was announced Sanaa Lathan, Linda Emond and Jihae had joined the cast of the series in recurring roles in the third season. In February 2021, it was reported that Hope Davis was cast in a recurring role in the third season. In March 2021, Dasha Nekrasova was reported to have a recurring role in the third season. In May 2021, Alexander Skarsgård was cast in a recurring role while Adrien Brody was cast to guest star for the third season. In August 2021, it was announced Ella Rumpf would guest star in the third season. In January 2023, it was announced that Adam Godley, Annabeth Gish, Eili Harboe and Jóhannes Haukur Jóhannesson were cast in the fourth season.

=== Costuming ===
Michelle Matland served as costume designer for all four seasons, and primarily costumed the characters in variations in black, navy blue, and beige and avoided using primary colors. The series' costuming aesthetic, using designer clothing with neutral colors and minimalist, logo-less designs, has been described as "stealth wealth" and "quiet luxury".

=== Filming ===
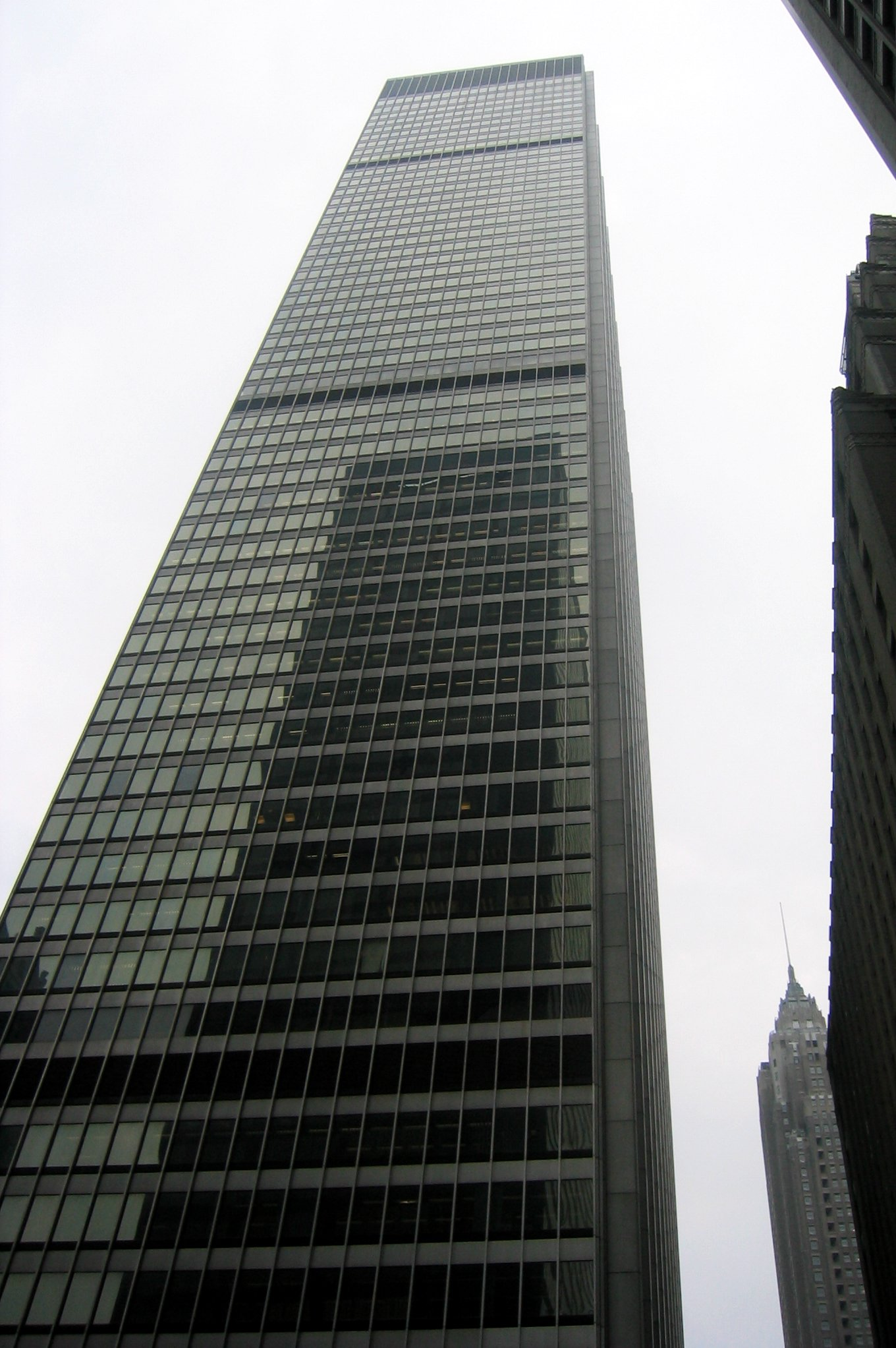
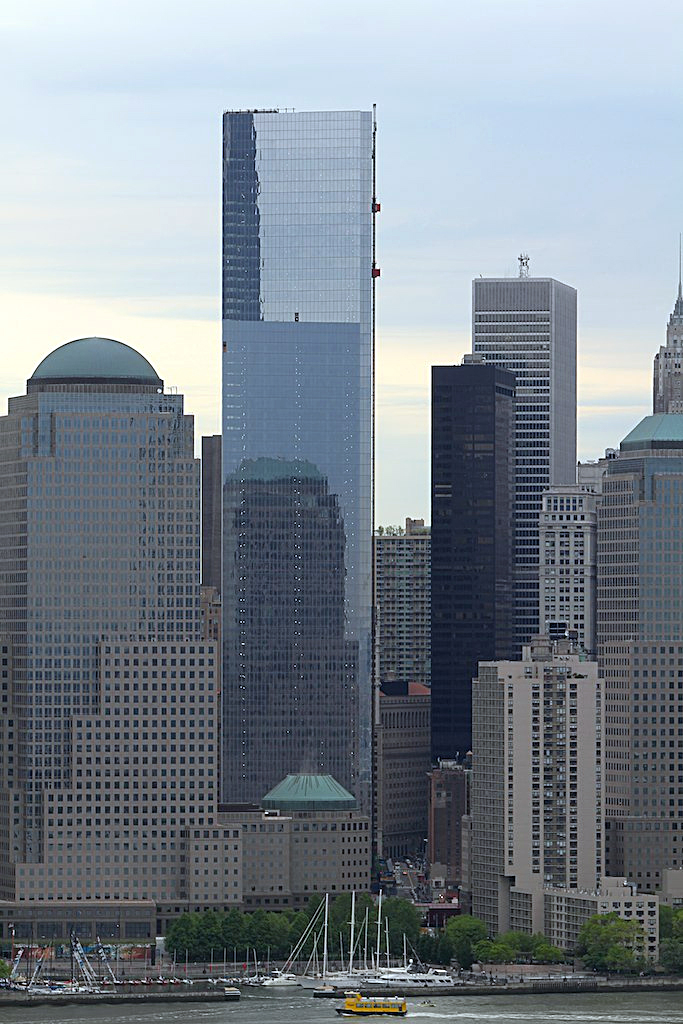
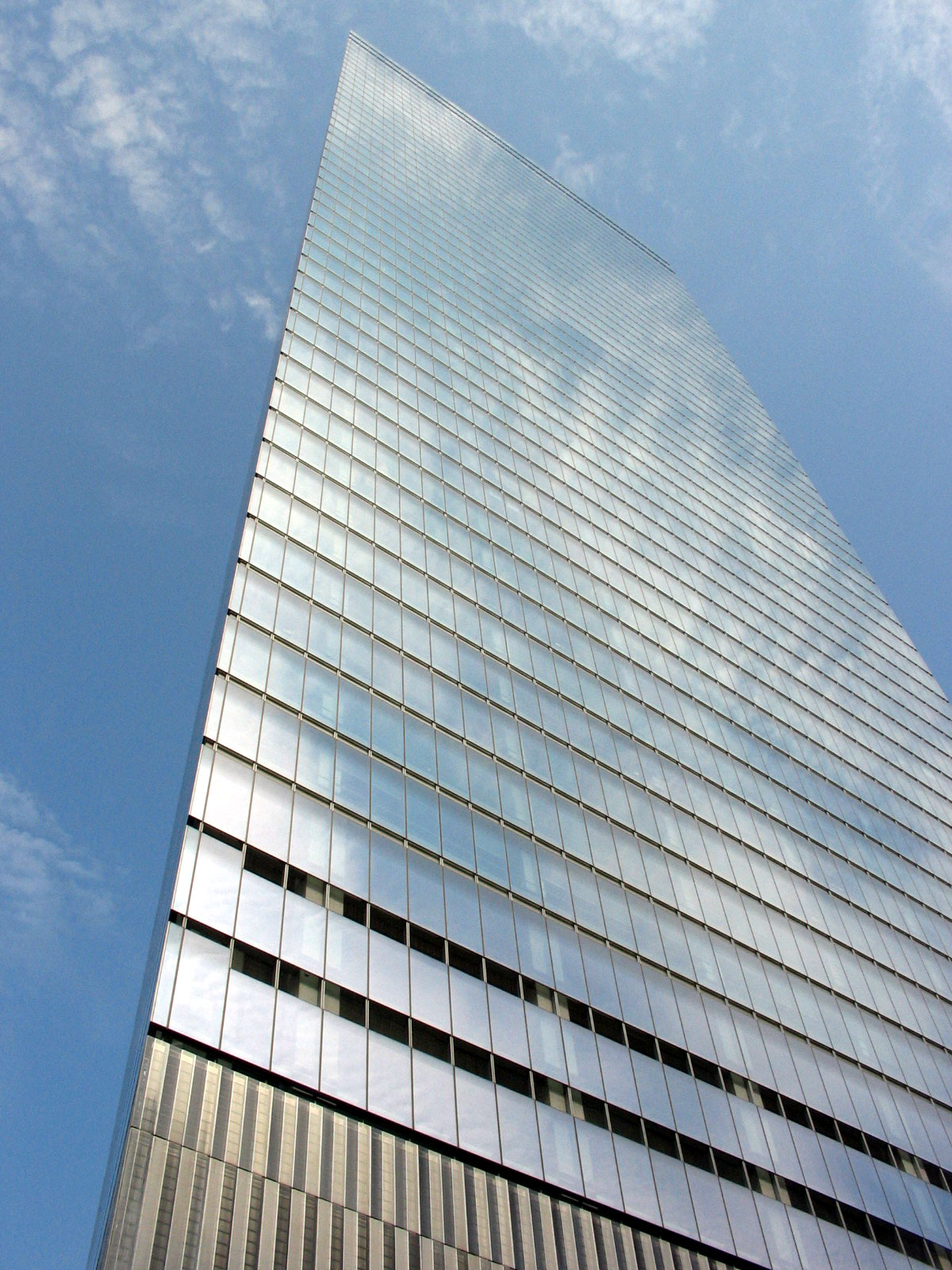
From left to right, the 28 Liberty Street, 4 World Trade Center, and 7 World Trade Center in New York City, which variously stand in for Waystar RoyCo's headquarters.

The series was primarily filmed in Manhattan, and shot on 35 mm film. The series is distinct for its predominantly handheld cinematography, which was inspired by the Dogme 95 movement and intended to embody the style of mockumentaries. Cinematographer Patrick Capone characterized the series' camerawork as "voyeuristic" and "non-cinema[tic]", relying on natural light, close coverage and frequent zooms to evoke the feeling of "eavesdropping" upon the characters and their environments.

Director Adam McKay filmed the pilot in late 2016, while principal photography for the rest of the first season of the series began in October 2017. Key locations included the American Irish Historical Society on Fifth Avenue as the location for Logan's apartment, 714 Broadway as the location of Shiv's season 1 apartment, and the Downtown Manhattan Heliport on the East River for scenes of the Roys departing on their helicopters. For scenes depicting the interiors of the Waystar RoyCo offices, the crew uses towers 4 and 7 of the World Trade Center, while 28 Liberty Street is used for exterior shots. Silvercup Studios in Queens houses many of the sets used for the series.

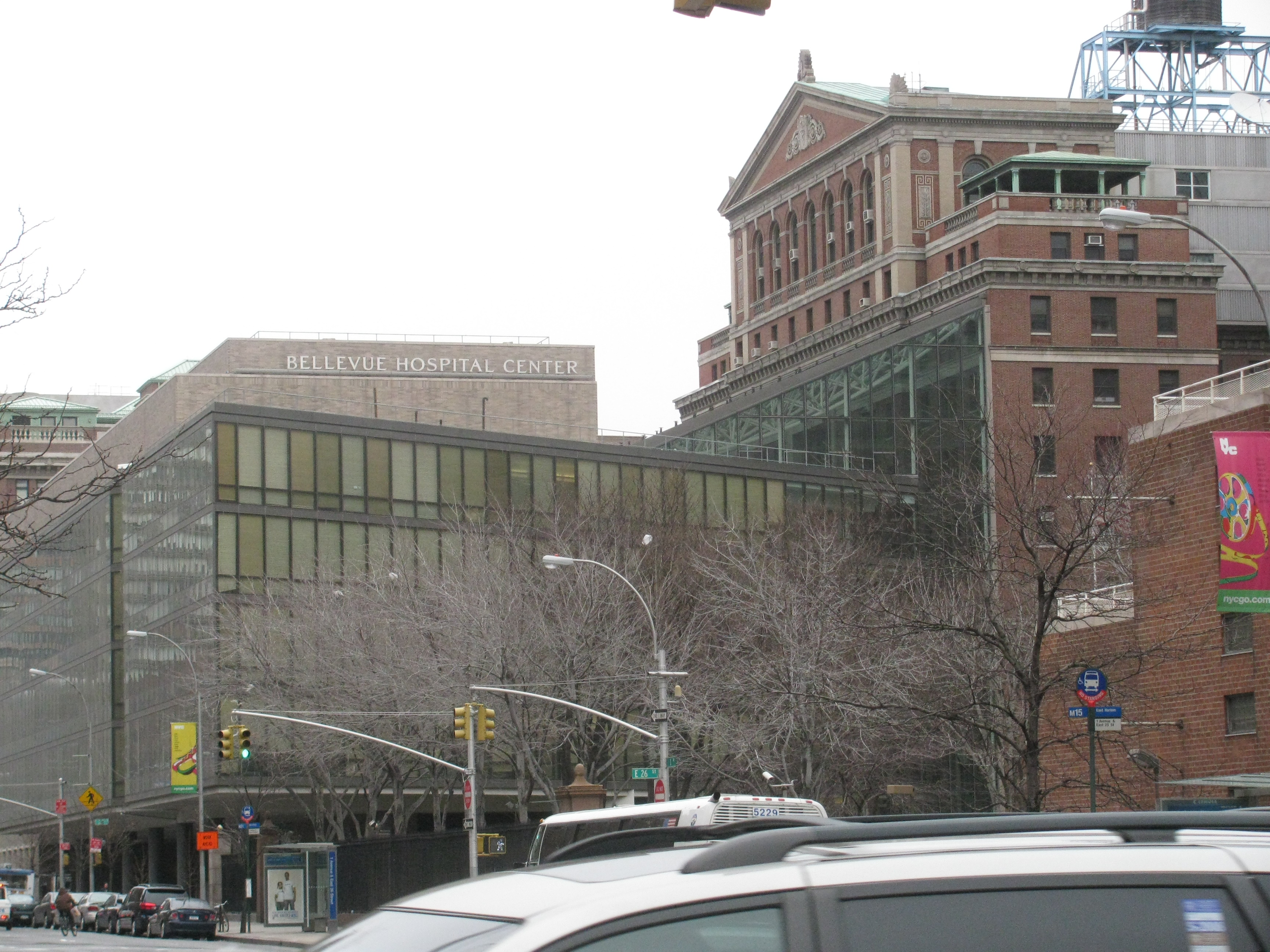
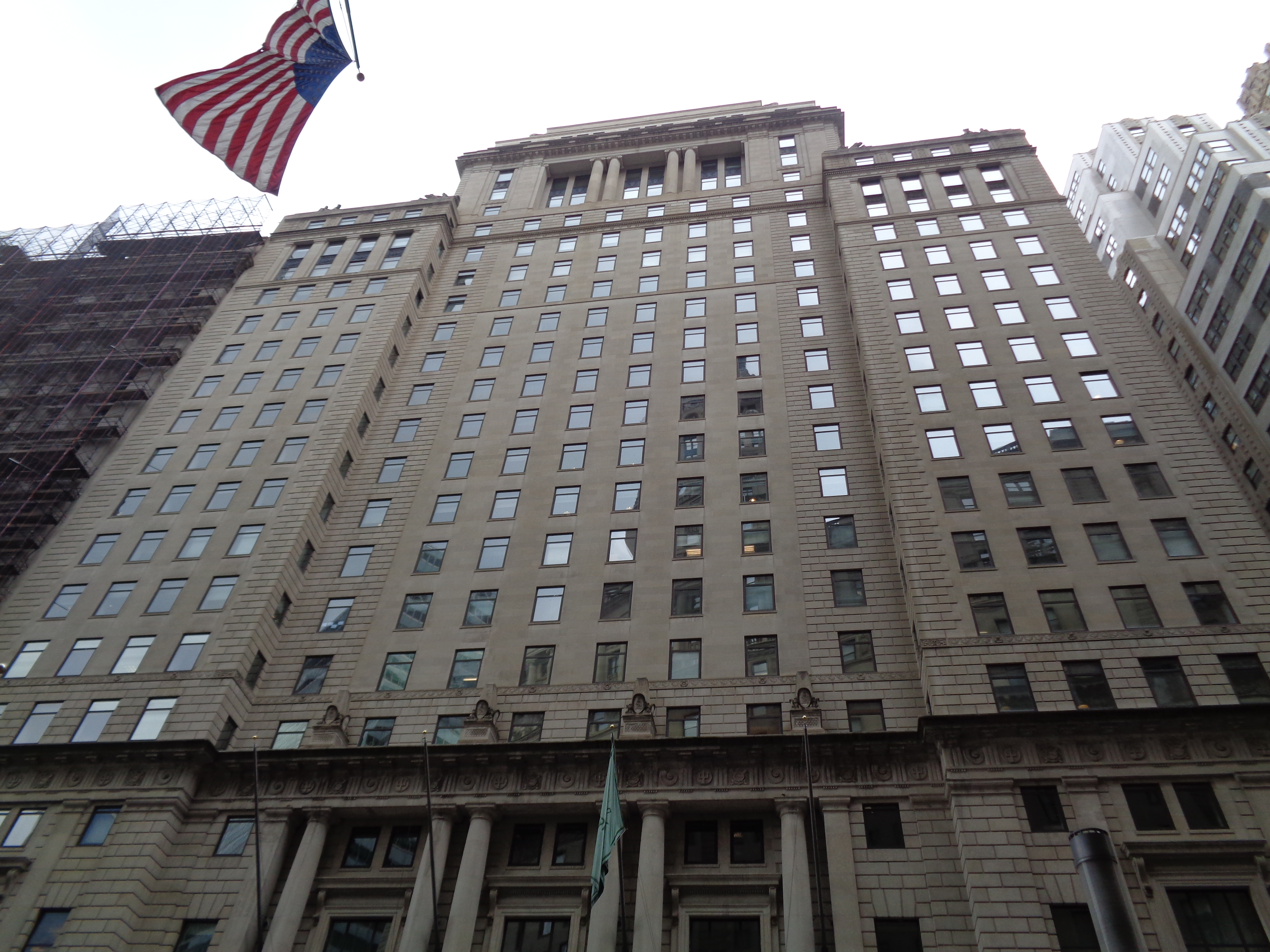
From left to right, the Bellevue Hospital and Cunard Building near New York City, locations where scenes from the first season were filmed.

Other filming locations for the first season included Bellevue Hospital (where the second episode took place), the Cunard Building on 25 Broadway (which houses Cipriani S.A., the venue for a gala in the fourth episode), the East New York Freight Tunnel (the entrance of a bachelor party in the eighth episode), and the Financial District of Lower Manhattan. From mid-to-end of January 2018, the production moved from New York to New Mexico for the episode "Austerlitz", which was primarily filmed in Santa Fe. On February 22, 2018, filming took place in New Jersey, which required the closing of the Atlantic City-Brigantine tunnel. On February 25, 2018, filming took place at Eastnor Castle near Ledbury in Herefordshire, England, which served as the setting for the last two episodes of the season.

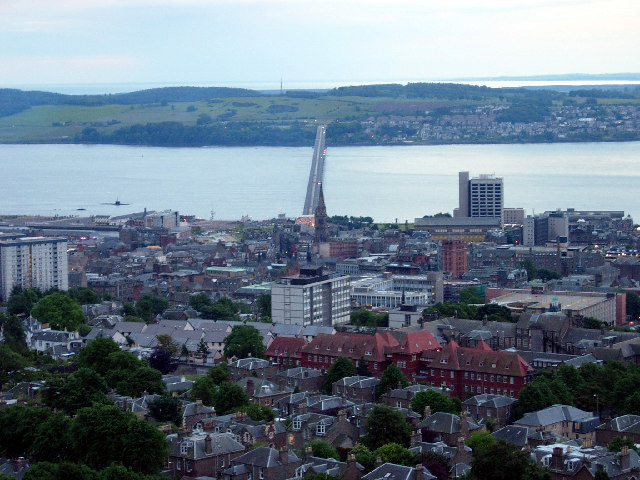
For season 2, scenes were filmed on location in Dundee, as well as surrounding areas in Scotland.

The second season saw a significant increase in location shifts. The opening scenes of the season premiere were shot on location in Iceland, while Henry Ford II's 1960 estate in the Hamptons was used as the Roys' summer home. Oheka Castle in Huntington, New York, stood in for the Roys' hunting lodge in Hungary for the episode "Hunting". Filming also took place on Long Island, with a mansion once belonging to Junius Spencer Morgan featuring prominently in the episode "Tern Haven". The estate is one of several in the area used as filming locations for the second season. From April through May 2019, the production recruited extras for filming in Lake Placid, and Lake George, New York, where the episode "Argestes" was shot. Production moved to Cox's hometown of Dundee for the eighth episode, with additional filming taking place in Glasgow and Ayr for the preceding episode (which takes place in England). Starting from July 17, 2019, the crew filmed in Korčula, Croatia, for the second-season finale episode "This Is Not for Tears", including extensive scenes on a yacht.

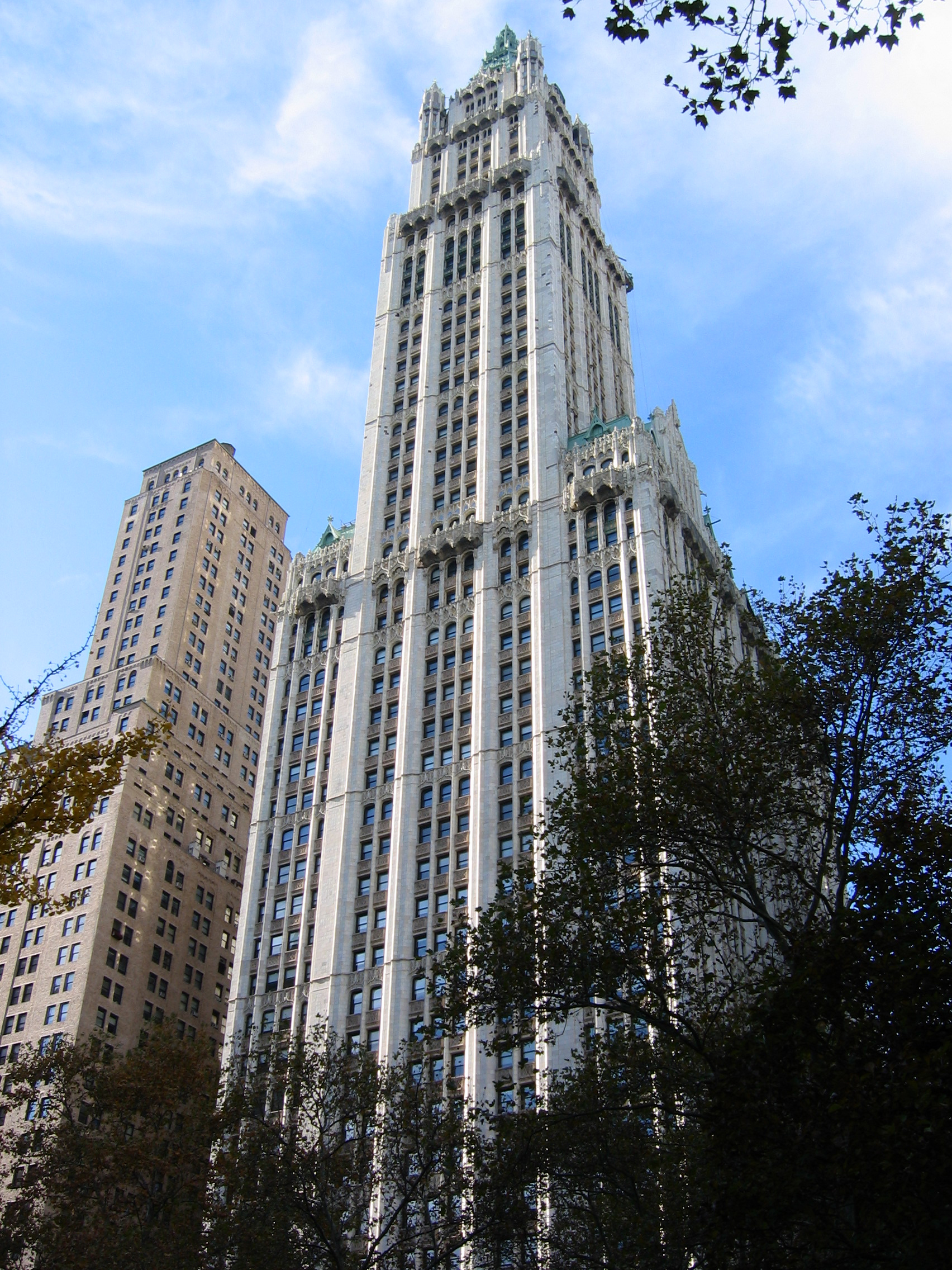
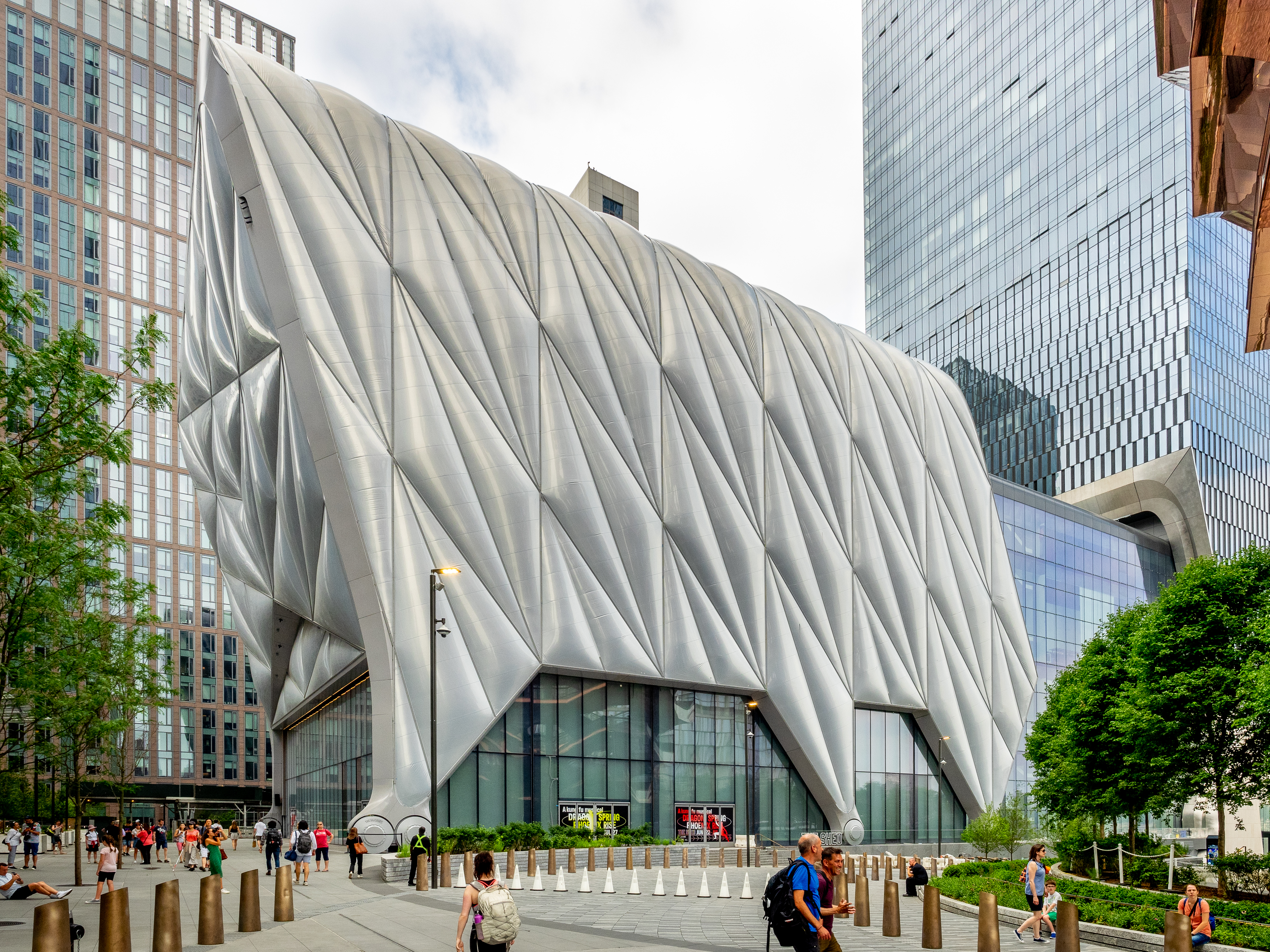
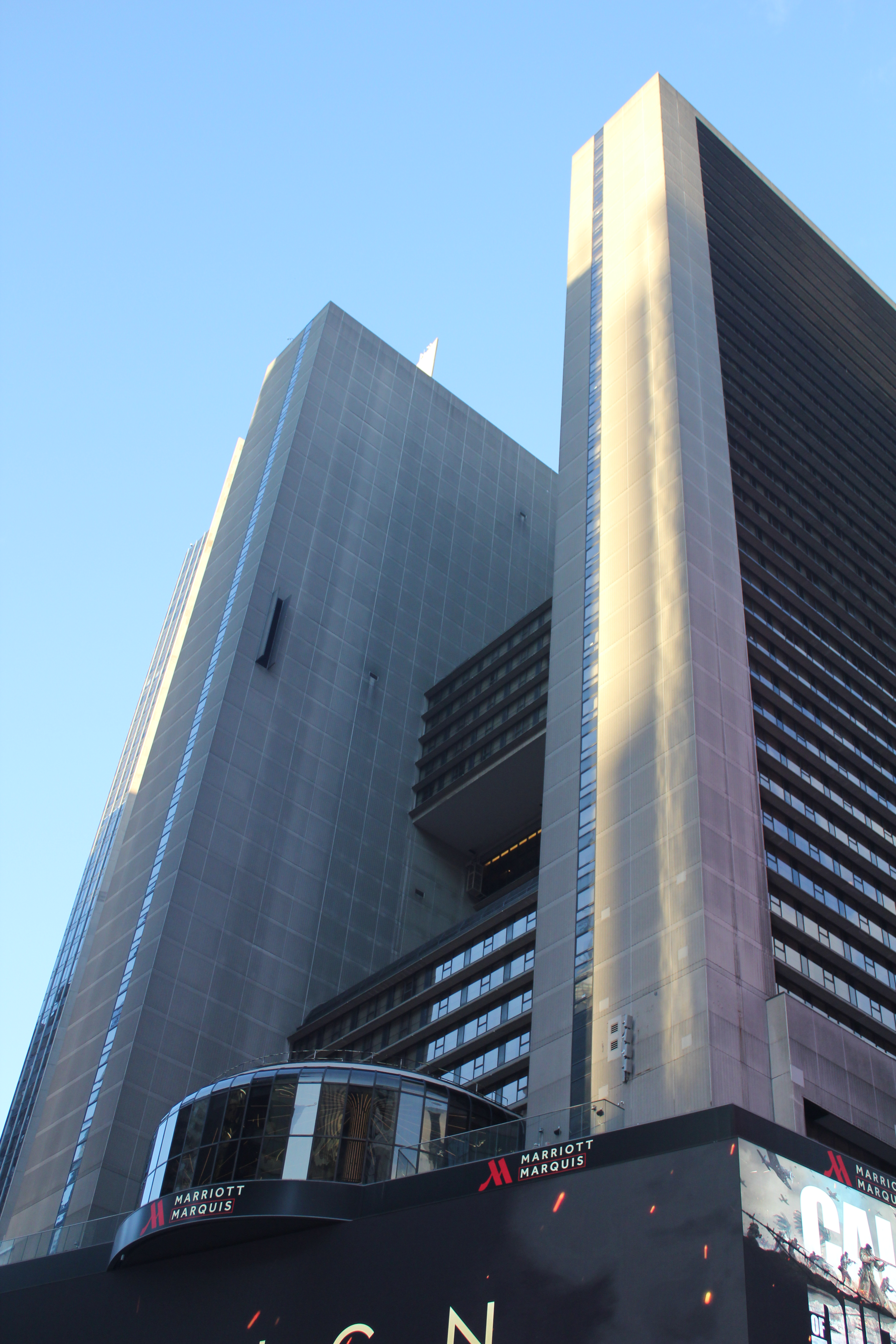
From left to right, the Woolworth Building, The Shed, and New York Marriott Marquis were locations used for season 3.

Filming for the third season, which was slated to begin in April 2020, was postponed due to the COVID-19 pandemic. In early November 2020, star Alan Ruck announced that filming would begin in mid-November in New York City. The season had begun filming in New York as of December 2020. Filming locations in the city included the Woolworth Building in Tribeca, The Shed in Hudson Yards, and a number of hotels including the Marriott Marquis in Times Square and the Plaza Hotel on Fifth Avenue. Production also returned to the Hamptons, at locations including Montauk and Wainscott. In May, additional filming for season 3 took place in Richmond, Virginia, primarily at the Jefferson Hotel. In June, production on the third season moved to Italy for the final two episodes, with filming primarily taking place in the Val d'Orcia region of Tuscany – where a wedding reception was filmed at the estates La Foce and Villa Cetinale. Additional filming took place in other nearby comuni in the province of Siena – including Pienza, Montalcino and Chianciano Terme – as well as in Cortona, Lake Como, Milan, and Florence (the lattermost of which was used for establishing shots in the opening episodes).

Production on the ten-episode fourth season began in New York City on June 27, 2022, with Mark Mylod directing the first episode. In October 2022, it was confirmed that filming occurred in western Norway, including locations such as the Atlantic Ocean Road, Romsdalen Gondola, Eggen Restaurant, and Juvet Landscape Hotel, as part of a storyline involving Skarsgård's character. The series also filmed in Los Angeles and Barbados for the fourth season.

=== Music ===
On November 17, 2017, it was reported that Nicholas Britell would serve as the series' composer. The score is considered as a combination of "hip hop and classical music" and along with the main title theme, it received critical acclaim and several accolades.

== Release and reception ==
On April 27, 2018, the series held its official world premiere during the Series Mania Festival in Lille, France, in which the pilot episode was screened. On May 22, 2018, the series held its official US premiere at the Time Warner Center in New York City. All four seasons aired on Sky Atlantic in the UK.

HBO released the first season on DVD on August 6, 2018, which included special features; a Blu-ray release was made available on November 6 of the same year. Subsequent seasons were released on DVD; season 2 on September 15, 2020, season 3 on May 17, 2022, and season 4 and the complete series on September 12, 2023. The complete series was released on Blu-ray on August 27, 2024.

=== Critical response ===
Critical response of Succession
Season	Rotten Tomatoes	Metacritic
1	89% (88 reviews)	70 (29 reviews)
2	97% (238 reviews)	89 (19 reviews)
3	97% (145 reviews)	92 (31 reviews)
4	97% (324 reviews)	92 (31 reviews)

The series has received an average score of 95% on the review aggregator website Rotten Tomatoes and a score of 85 on Metacritic. In 2021, BBC Culture polled 206 "critics, journalists, academics and industry figures" from around the world to compile the 100 greatest television series of the 21st century; Succession came in at number 10. In 2022, Rolling Stone ranked the show number 11 on its list of the 100 greatest TV shows. In 2023, Variety ranked Succession #13 on its own list of the 100 greatest TV shows of all time. The series has often drawn parallels to the works of William Shakespeare, particularly King Lear.

The first season was met with positive reviews from critics. On the review aggregation website Rotten Tomatoes, the season holds an approval rating of 89% with an average rating of 7.9/10, based on 89 reviews. The website's critical consensus reads, "Peppering its pathos with acid wit, Succession is a divine comedy of absolute power and dysfunction – brought to vivid life by a ferocious ensemble." Metacritic, which uses a weighted average, assigned the season a score of 70 out of 100 based on 29 critics, indicating "generally favorable reviews".

The second season received widespread critical acclaim. On Rotten Tomatoes, the season holds a 97% rating with an average rating of 8.9/10, based on 238 reviews. The website's critical consensus reads, "Succession returns in darkly funny form, with sharp writing, exceptional performances, and a surprising new level of sympathy for some of television's least likable characters." On Metacritic, the season has a weighted average score of 89 out of 100, based on 19 critics, indicating "universal acclaim".

The third season received critical acclaim. On Rotten Tomatoes, the season holds a 97% approval rating with an average rating of 9.3/10, based on 146 reviews. The website's critical consensus reads, "Fans already buying what Succession is selling will be pleasantly surprised to find its third season in crackling form – even if it gets a little too real from time to time." On Metacritic, the season has a weighted average score of 92 out of 100, based on 31 critics, indicating "universal acclaim".

The fourth and final season received widespread critical acclaim. On Rotten Tomatoes, the season holds an approval rating of 97% with an average rating of 9.2/10, based on 324 reviews. The website's critical consensus reads, "As compulsively watchable as ever, Succession's final season concludes the saga of the backbiting Roy family on a typically brilliant – and colorfully profane – high note." On Metacritic, the season has received a weighted average score of 92 out of 100, based on 31 critics, indicating "universal acclaim".

=== Reaction from Murdoch family ===
Executive producer Frank Rich told Town & Country in 2019 that he heard from Murdoch insiders that members of the family found the show to be "interesting" and even "amusing". Rupert Murdoch responded to an e-mail sent by a Semafor reporter that he had never seen the show. Furthermore, Vanity Fair reported that as part of the settlement for her divorce from Murdoch, Jerry Hall was barred from contacting Succession producers with ideas for storylines.

According to a December 2024 Nevada commissioner's report for the state's probate court in the disputed succession of Rupert Murdoch, the depiction of the chaotic aftermath of Logan Roy's death in "Connor's Wedding" in April 2023 prompted Murdoch's children to discuss their own public relations strategy for their father's death. Ultimately the discussions led to Elisabeth Murdoch's trust representative drafting a memorandum to create a plan to avoid a similar scenario from occurring in real life. The commissioner's report also criticized one of Rupert and Lachlan Murdoch's trust representatives for lacking knowledge about the family and conducting research through watching Succession.

=== Ratings ===
The series premiere drew 582,000 live viewers, down from the 1.39 million viewers that watched its lead-in, Westworld. The second-season finale drew 1.1 million viewers across all viewing platforms. The third season premiered to 1.4 million viewers across various platforms and ended with 1.7 million viewers across all viewing platforms, a record high for the show. The series finale drew 2.9 million viewers, making it the highest watched episode of the show. This was a 68% increase from the 1.7 million viewers for the third-season finale.

Succession : U.S. viewers per episode (thousands)
Audience measurement performed by Nielsen Media Research

=== Accolades ===
Succession has received numerous awards and nominations from various television award ceremonies. It has received 75 Primetime Emmy Award nominations with 19 wins. Its first season received five nominations at the 71st Primetime Emmy Awards, including Outstanding Drama Series, and Jesse Armstrong won for Outstanding Writing for a Drama Series (for the episode "Nobody Is Ever Missing").

Its second season received 18 nominations with seven wins at the 72nd Primetime Emmy Awards; including Outstanding Drama Series, Jeremy Strong for Outstanding Lead Actor in a Drama Series, Cherry Jones for Outstanding Guest Actress in a Drama Series, Armstrong for Outstanding Writing for a Drama Series (for the episode "This Is Not for Tears") and Andrij Parekh for Outstanding Directing for a Drama Series (for the episode "Hunting"). Brian Cox, Matthew Macfadyen, Kieran Culkin, Nicholas Braun, Sarah Snook, James Cromwell, and Harriet Walter all received acting nominations. The season broke the record for the most acting nominations in a single year, with 14.

Its third season received a leading 25 nominations with four wins at the 74th Primetime Emmy Awards; including Outstanding Drama Series, Macfadyen for Outstanding Supporting Actor in a Drama Series, and Armstrong for Outstanding Writing for a Drama Series (for the episode "All the Bells Say"). Cox, Strong, Culkin, Braun, Snook, Cromwell, and Walter all received repeat nominations, while J. Smith-Cameron, Adrien Brody, Arian Moayed, Alexander Skarsgård, Hope Davis, and Sanaa Lathan all received acting nominations as well. The series also received three nominations for Outstanding Directing for a Drama Series.

Its fourth and final season received a leading 27 nominations with six wins at the 75th Primetime Emmy Awards: including Outstanding Drama Series; Culkin for Outstanding Lead Actor in a Drama Series; Snook for Outstanding Lead Actress in a Drama Series; Macfadyen for Outstanding Supporting Actor in a Drama Series; and Armstrong and Mark Mylod for Outstanding Writing and Directing for a Drama Series, respectively, for the episode "Connor's Wedding". Nominations included Cox and Strong for Outstanding Lead Actor in a Drama Series; Braun, Alan Ruck, and Skarsgård for Outstanding Supporting Actor in a Drama Series; Smith-Cameron for Outstanding Supporting Actress in a Drama Series; and Cromwell, Moayed, Abbass, Jones, and Walter all received guest acting nominations. It also received two nominations for Outstanding Directing for a Drama Series (for the episodes "Living+" and "America Decides").

== Podcast ==
In July 2020, HBO launched a companion podcast, HBO's Succession Podcast. The first season featured British-American broadcaster, podcaster, and filmmaker Roger Bennett interviewing members of the cast over eight episodes. The second season featured American journalist Kara Swisher discussing with guests how season three plot points tied to real world events. A third season of the podcast continued the same format to examine the fourth and final season of the series, with Swisher reprising hosting duties.

== See also ==
- List of Primetime Emmy Awards received by HBO
- Succession of Rupert Murdoch, a 2024 court dispute over the terms of the family trust
