= New Jerusalem (play) =

New Jerusalem is a play written by David Ives, based on a true story that features the noted philosopher and scholar Baruch Spinoza, a Jewish-Dutch philosopher of Portuguese Sephardi origin. Complete title and subtitle: New Jerusalem; The Interrogation of Baruch de Spinoza at Talmud Torah Congregation: Amsterdam, July 27, 1656.

== Synopsis ==
Spinoza’s writing and inquiries have caused trouble for himself and other Jews, who are not completely accepted by Dutch society. He is said to be spreading poisonous thought, and to be a threat to the piety and the morality of the city. He is accused of atheism and heresy for challenging important tenets of Judaism and Christianity. He is interrogated by the Jewish authorities, and his ideas are debated, with the threat of excommunication and ostracism. The play follows the young Spinoza into the tavern, and to his music teacher he is in love with. Everywhere he goes his ideas and character are challenged. The play ends in catastrophe — the excommunication of Spinoza.

== Context ==
In an interview regarding this play author David Ives points out that the Jewish authorities were "faced with a very difficult question: They had made a deal with the Dutch authorities that in order to retain their freedom to practice their religion, they would police their own community. This was a Faustian bargain that they had to fulfill." The play tells of a young man whose community needed to shut him out if they were to survive in Amsterdam.

Though Spinoza’s ideas are lucidly expressed, the real subject of New Jerusalem may be the “problematic place of revealed religion in a secular society”, according to one critic. At the start of the play it is revealed that Spinoza has been spied on by an agent of the Calvinist leaders of Amsterdam, who fear the spread of atheism may be a threat. "We are tolerant, but we have our limits," says the character Abraham van Valkenburgh. "Like the God of Israel, we can smite. And with a vengeance." He warns the chief rabbi a heretic exists in his community, and he must take action or there will be dire trouble.

It is described as a "battle of ideas", a "portrait of the philosopher as a young man", and a "daring leap into metaphysics". Peter Marks has said, "One of the fascinating facets of Ives's play is the degree to which the gears of the gentle Spinoza's probing intellect, and his effort to understand the nature of the universe in ways not explained in Scripture, seem to his adversaries to be instruments of chaos and terror."

== Production history ==
It opened January 13, 2008 at the Classic Stage Company in New York. It was directed by Walter Bobbie, with sets by John Lee Beatty costumes by Anita Yavich, and lighting by Ken Billington, with a cast that included Richard Easton, Jeremy Strong, Fyvush Finkel, David Garrison, Jenn Harris, Michael Izquierdo and Natalia Payne.

It opened July 2, 2010 at Theatre J in Washington D.C., where it broke box office records, and was directed by Jeremy Skidmore.

It was produced in 2018 at the New Jewish Theatre in New York, and the Lantern Theatre Company in Philadelphia.

New Jerusalem was performed at the Skirball Cultural Center in Los Angeles. and recorded as an audio book with a cast that includes Edward Asner, Richard Easton, Andrea Gabriel, Arye Gross, Amy Pietz, James Wagner, Matthew Wolf.
