= Jeremy Strong =

American actor (born 1978)

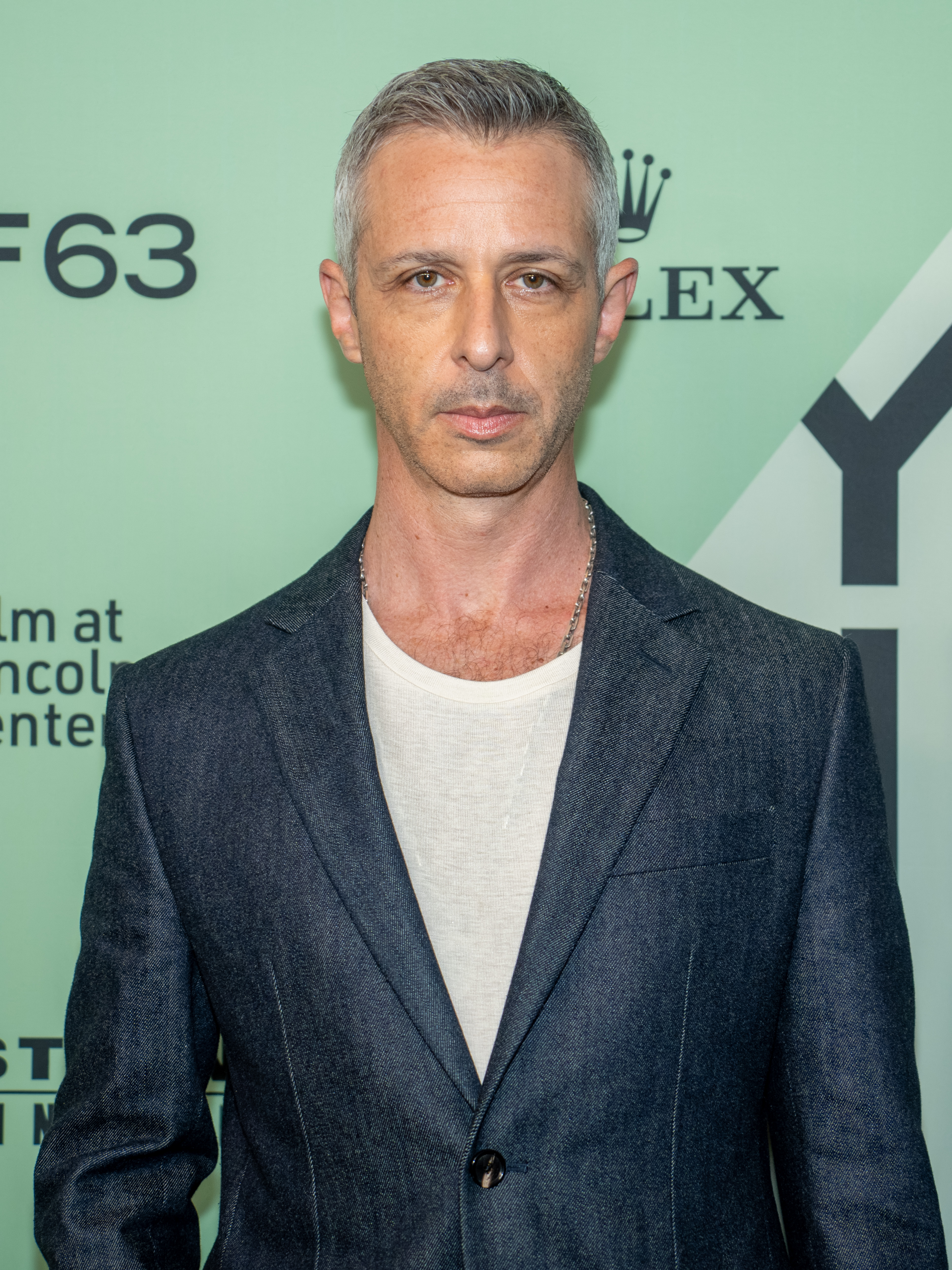
- Strong in 2025
- Born: December 25, 1978 (age 47); Boston, Massachusetts, U.S.
- Education: Yale University (BA)
- Occupation: Actor
- Years active: 1990s–present
- Spouse: Emma Wall (m. 2016)
- Children: 3
- Awards: Full list

Jeremy Strong (born December 25, 1978) is an American actor. Known for his intense method acting style in roles across both stage and screen, (Note: An excerpt from the corresponding section of this article: Such techniques are often referred to as method acting, but Strong prefers the term "identity diffusion" because he does not draw on his own life experience.) he has received accolades including a Tony Award, a Primetime Emmy Award, and a Golden Globe Award as well as nominations for an Academy Award and a BAFTA Award. In 2022, Strong was featured on Time's list of the 100 most influential people in the world.

A graduate of Yale University, Strong studied acting at the Royal Academy of Dramatic Art in London and the Steppenwolf Theatre Company in Chicago. His film debut came that same year with the comedy Humboldt County, and he played small roles in the films Lincoln (2012), Zero Dark Thirty (2012), Parkland (2013), and The Big Short (2015). Strong's breakthrough was his portrayal of Kendall Roy in the HBO drama series Succession (2018–2023), winning the Primetime Emmy Award and the Golden Globe Award for Best Actor in a Drama Series.

Strong acted in the films Lincoln (2012), The Gentlemen (2019), The Trial of the Chicago 7 (2020), and Armageddon Time (2022). For his portrayal of Roy Cohn in the biographical drama The Apprentice (2024), he earned Best Supporting Actor nominations for the Academy Award, Actor Award, BAFTA Award, and Golden Globe Award. He also portrayed music producer Jon Landau in the musical biopic Springsteen: Deliver Me from Nowhere (2025) and Mark Zuckerberg in the legal thriller The Social Reckoning (2026).

On stage, Strong made his off-Broadway debut in the John Patrick Shanley play Defiance in 2006, with his Broadway debut portrayed the role of Richard Rich in the revival of A Man for All Seasons in 2008. He returned to Broadway playing a conscientious doctor in a small town in the revival of the Henrik Ibsen play An Enemy of the People in 2024, earning a Tony Award for Best Actor in a Play.

== Early life ==
Strong was born on 25 December 1978 in Boston, Massachusetts, to Maureen and David Strong. His mother is of Irish descent, and his father's family is Jewish, originally from Russia; his paternal grandfather worked as a plumber in Queens, New York City. His mother worked as a hospice nurse, and his father worked in juvenile jails. He lived in a "rough neighborhood" in the Jamaica Plain area of Boston, a place he often regarded as "somewhere I just wanted to get out of." His family was working class. Since his parents could not afford to go on vacations outside the Boston area, they put a canoe on cinder blocks in the family's backyard; Strong and his brothers would often sit in it and pretend to take trips. His parents had a tumultuous relationship throughout his childhood and eventually divorced.

When Strong was 10, his parents moved the family to the suburb of Sudbury, for better schools. Strong recalled Sudbury as "a kind of country-club town where we didn't belong to the country club". His interest in acting began there, as he became involved with a children's theater group and performing in musicals. Among his costars in the children's theater group was Chris Evans' older sister; Evans remembers being impressed by Strong's performances. Later, Evans and Strong acted together in a high school production of A Midsummer Night's Dream.

Strong particularly idolized actors Daniel Day-Lewis, Al Pacino, and Dustin Hoffman—all famous for the lengths they went to preparing for roles—putting posters of their films on his bedroom wall and avidly following news of their careers as well as reading every interview they gave. When the 1996 film adaptation of Arthur Miller's The Crucible, starring Day-Lewis, was filmed near Boston, Strong got a job on the film's greenery crew, at one point holding up a branch outside a window during the filming of a scene. Strong worked on the sound crew for Amistad, holding a boom mike over Anthony Hopkins as he made a speech, and he helped to edit Pacino's directorial debut Looking for Richard.

After high school, Strong applied to colleges with a letter of recommendation from DreamWorks, which had made Amistad. He was accepted at Yale University and granted a scholarship, intending to study drama. On his first day in class, he found the professor's discussions of Konstantin Stanislavski and accompanying blackboard illustrations so alienating that he decided immediately to change his major to English.

Strong continued to act and starred in a number of plays at Yale, all of them produced through the student-run Yale Dramatic Association, known as the Dramat. The plays were all ones that Pacino had performed, such as American Buffalo, The Indian Wants the Bronx, and Hughie. Strong arranged an offstage visit from Pacino, which did not go down well with other members of the Dramat, because it was budgeted so extravagantly that it nearly bankrupted their organization. Despite claiming not to remember the cost overruns, Strong admitted to being a "rogue agent" in planning the event. During one summer at Yale, Strong received an internship with Hoffman's production company. He also studied at the Royal Academy of Dramatic Art in London and the Steppenwolf Theatre Company in Chicago.

== Career ==
=== 2001–2008: Early years on stage ===
After Yale, Strong moved to New York in 2001. He lived in a small apartment in SoHo, above a restaurant where he waited tables. Strong described it as a state of "gilded squalor" (in the words of Francis Bacon), with little but his bed, books, and a closet with expensive clothing. When not working, he persuaded local FedEx offices to give him some free envelopes in which he put headshots and recordings of himself performing monologues to distribute to talent agencies. For almost a year, he got no calls for auditions. In an attempt to get representation, Strong contacted his former schoolmate Evans, who had become successful after Not Another Teen Movie. Evans set up a meeting between Strong and his agent at Creative Artists Agency, who chose not to sign Strong.

The following summer, Strong got a spot in the summer company at the Williamstown Theatre Festival in western Massachusetts. Strong continued to work offstage in theater and film. In 2003, his position as an assistant at an independent film production company led to his service as Day-Lewis's personal assistant on The Ballad of Jack and Rose, released two years later. On set, he was so devoted to attending to Day-Lewis, who lived apart from his family during the shoot, that crew members nicknamed him Cletus after the character from The Simpsons, for his focus on menial tasks. Strong has stated that at the end of the shoot, Day-Lewis wrote him a note "that contains many of what have become my most deeply held precepts and beliefs about this work." He has not publicized the contents of the note out of respect for Day-Lewis.

Strong returned to Williamstown in 2004 when he was cast with Jessica Chastain, Chris Messina, and Michelle Williams in The Cherry Orchard. He became friends with all three actors, and for intermittent periods in the late 2000s, he lived in the basement of Williams' townhouse in the Brooklyn neighborhood of Boerum Hill when he could not afford his own apartment.

During the mid-2000s, he worked as a typist for playwright Wendy Wasserstein. At night, he performed the role of an alcoholic Irishman in a one-man Conor McPherson play in a small bar in Midtown Manhattan. After Wasserstein discovered how much time Strong was spending observing her building's Irish doorman for the part, she considered writing a play based on Strong and the doorman but was unable to proceed with it before her death in 2006. Frank Rich, one of Wasserstein's close friends, said Strong was "her assistant, slash—to some extent—caregiver."

By that time, Strong had begun getting off-Broadway roles. He took part in Marine weapons training at Camp Lejeune to prepare for his role as a marine in the John Patrick Shanley play Defiance (2005). David Rooney described Strong's character as a "a distraught, uneducated soldier from the small-town South". Rooney described his performance as "intense" noting, "while [the] dramaturgical shortcomings hamper the actors...Strong has emotional impact in his single scene." Strong immersed himself in early 17th-century Dutch philosophy to play a young Baruch Spinoza in David Ives's New Jerusalem in 2008. Also in 2008, Strong was asked to understudy with six hours' notice for an actor who had a family emergency; by the next night, he had memorized all the character's lines. He received favorable notice for this performance, and he was able to sign with an agent.

=== 2009–2023: Film roles and Succession ===
Later in 2008, he made his Broadway debut in A Man for All Seasons at the American Airlines Theatre. Strong portrayed Richard Rich opposite Frank Langella as Thomas More. Ben Brantley of The New York Times described Strong as a "talented" actor portraying the "ambitious moral-chameleon". He was chosen as the 2008/2009 Leonore Annenberg Fellow by Lincoln Center Theater and nominated for the Lucille Lortel Award for Outstanding Lead Actor in a Play twice within a three-year period. Strong's Defiance role helped him secure his first film role in Humboldt County. He played Abraham Lincoln's secretary John George Nicolay, acting opposite Day-Lewis in Steven Spielberg's historical drama Lincoln (2012).

He went on to play a CIA analyst in Kathryn Bigelow's historical drama Zero Dark Thirty (2012) opposite Chastain, Lee Harvey Oswald in political drama Parkland (2013), James Reeb in Ava DuVernay's civil rights drama Selma (2014), a mentally-disabled person in legal drama The Judge (2014), and a real estate developer in Aaron Sorkin's drama Molly's Game (2017), reuniting with Chastain again. Strong was set to play a leading role in a major film for the first time in Bigelow's period crime drama Detroit (2017) as a soldier and practiced his marksmanship in preparation, but he was fired from the film after the first day of shooting because, according to Bigelow, "the character wasn't working in the story." Strong later persuaded her to give him another part in the film.

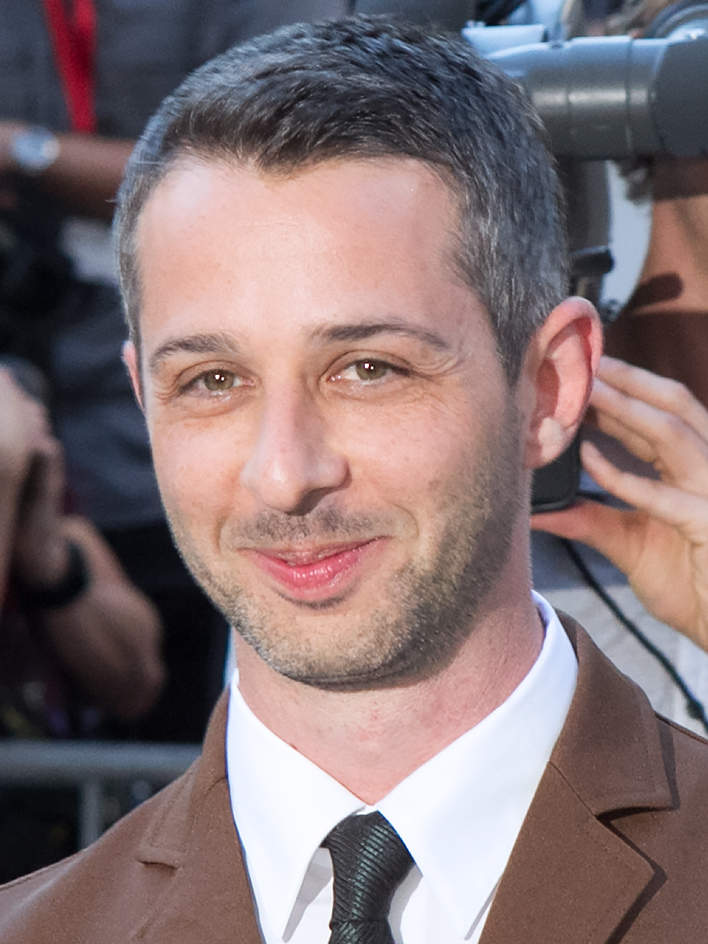
Strong in 2014

Strong's role in the 2015 Adam McKay film The Big Short led McKay to offer him a part in the TV series Succession. He initially was interested in playing Roman Roy, the family's wisecracking youngest son, but after the part was given to Kieran Culkin, Strong auditioned for the part of the middle son, Kendall Roy. The role was a career breakthrough for him; Strong's performance in the role has received universal acclaim from critics, and his performance won him a Primetime Emmy Award for Outstanding Lead Actor in a Drama Series in 2020. He also received the Golden Globe Award for Best Actor – Television Series Drama and an Actor Award for Outstanding Performance by an Ensemble in a Drama Series. TVLine named Strong "Performer of the Year" in 2021 for his work on Succession, writing, "For three seasons now, Strong has been carefully crafting a portrait of a little boy lost, a man who knows how to play the corporate hero but doesn't know how to be OK with himself. ... Succession remains one of the best shows on television in large part because Strong's central performance is so complex and so fascinating."

Strong appeared in Guy Ritchie's action comedy The Gentlemen (2019), a film that he did not want to discuss on the record with The New Yorker. In 2020, he reunited with Sorkin playing a central role as anti-war activist Jerry Rubin, part of the Chicago Seven, in the Sorkin's directed Netflix drama The Trial of the Chicago 7 (2020). Rooney of The Hollywood Reporter wrote "Strong gives Jerry a touching puppy-dog innocence and vulnerability". For his performance he was nominated for an Actor Award for Outstanding Performance by a Cast in a Motion Picture. The film received critical acclaim as well as six nominations in the 93rd Academy Awards. He acted in the James Gray coming-of-age drama Armageddon Time (2022) alongside Anne Hathaway and Hopkins. The film had its world premiere at the 2022 Cannes Film Festival. Justin Chang of NPR wrote, "Strong is terrific — and very un-Kendall Roy-like — as Paul's father, a plumber with a big heart and a fierce temper".

=== 2024–present: Career expansion ===
In 2024, Strong returned to Broadway in the Amy Herzog adaptation of the Henrik Ibsen play An Enemy of the People directed by Sam Gold. He garnered universal acclaim and won the Tony Award for Best Actor in a Play for his role as Dr. Thomas Stockmann, a principled doctor who attempts to alert the public that their town's spa water is contaminated. He next portrayed Roy Cohn, a ruthless lawyer and mentor to Donald Trump, played by Sebastian Stan, in the biographical drama The Apprentice, which premiered at the 2024 Cannes Film Festival. Owen Gleiberman of Variety described his performance as "magnetic." Rooney of The Hollywood Reporter noted, "It's to Strong's credit that, while playing an odious, utterly irredeemable human being, he finds notes of pathos in Cohn's decline." For his work, Strong was nominated as Best Supporting Actor for an Academy Award, a BAFTA Award, an Actor Award, and a Golden Globe Award.

In 2025, Strong was invited to serve as a jury member at the 2025 Cannes Film Festival. He was also invited to join the Actors Branch of the Academy of Motion Picture Arts and Sciences.

Strong portrayed Jon Landau, manager for Bruce Springsteen, in the biographical film Springsteen: Deliver Me from Nowhere released on October 24, 2025. The film is based on the book of the same name about the making of Springsteen's 1982 album Nebraska. Also that year, Strong served as executive producer on Netflix documentary The White House Effect.

Strong portrayed Mark Zuckerberg in The Social Reckoning, a companion piece to The Social Network (2010). Directed and written by Sorkin, this is the third time they've worked together. Strong is also set to star in and produce The Best of Us, a Paramount+ series about the 9/11 first responders.

== Acting philosophy and technique ==
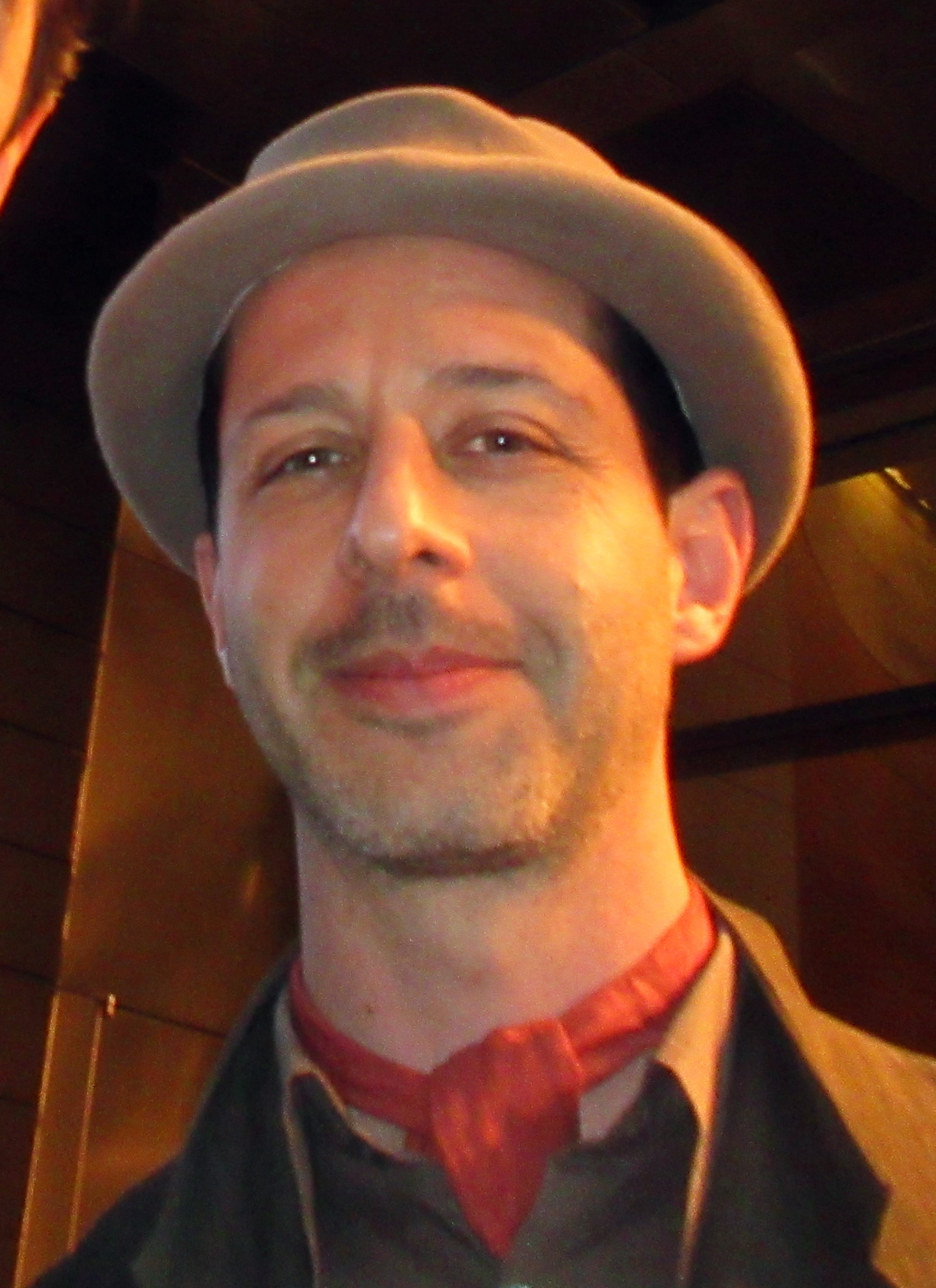
Strong in 2019

Strong prepares intensely for his roles, often to replicate some aspect of the character whether or not it is prominent in his portrayal. He has stated, "I think you have to go through whatever the ordeal is that the character has to go through". For The Judge, where he played the main character's developmentally disabled younger brother, he spent time with an autistic man as Hoffman had for Rain Man, and he requested personalized props for the character not mentioned in the script. "All I know is, he crosses the Rubicon", said costar Robert Downey Jr.. For The Big Short, Strong followed his real life counterpart Vincent Daniel, and observed his mannerisms, which included constantly chewing gum, something Strong did in all his scenes. In preparation for his Succession audition for Kendall Roy, he read Michael Wolff's biography of media mogul Rupert Murdoch and his family, which mentions that Murdoch's son James is known for lacing his shoes very tightly; Strong thus did the same for the audition, believing that it expressed the character's "inner tensile strength".

Strong's devotion to his craft occasionally has led to personal injury. In the first season Succession episode "Which Side Are You On?", his character had to run a considerable distance to be present at a board meeting after his limousine gets stuck in traffic. Because Strong wanted to be genuinely sweaty and breathless in every take, he ran as fast and far as he could in Tom Ford dress shoes and fractured his foot. Two seasons later, he jumped off a 5-foot-high (1.5 m) platform, wearing Gucci shoes while filming the episode "Too Much Birthday", impacting his tibia and femur and requiring a leg brace. The take ultimately was not used.

Strong seldom rehearses, saying he wants "every scene to feel like I'm encountering a bear in the woods", an approach he admits may not be popular with his costars. On The Trial of the Chicago 7, Strong asked to be sprayed with tear gas. Director Sorkin stated "I don't like saying no to Jeremy... But there were 200 people in that scene and another seventy on the crew, so I declined to spray them with poison gas".

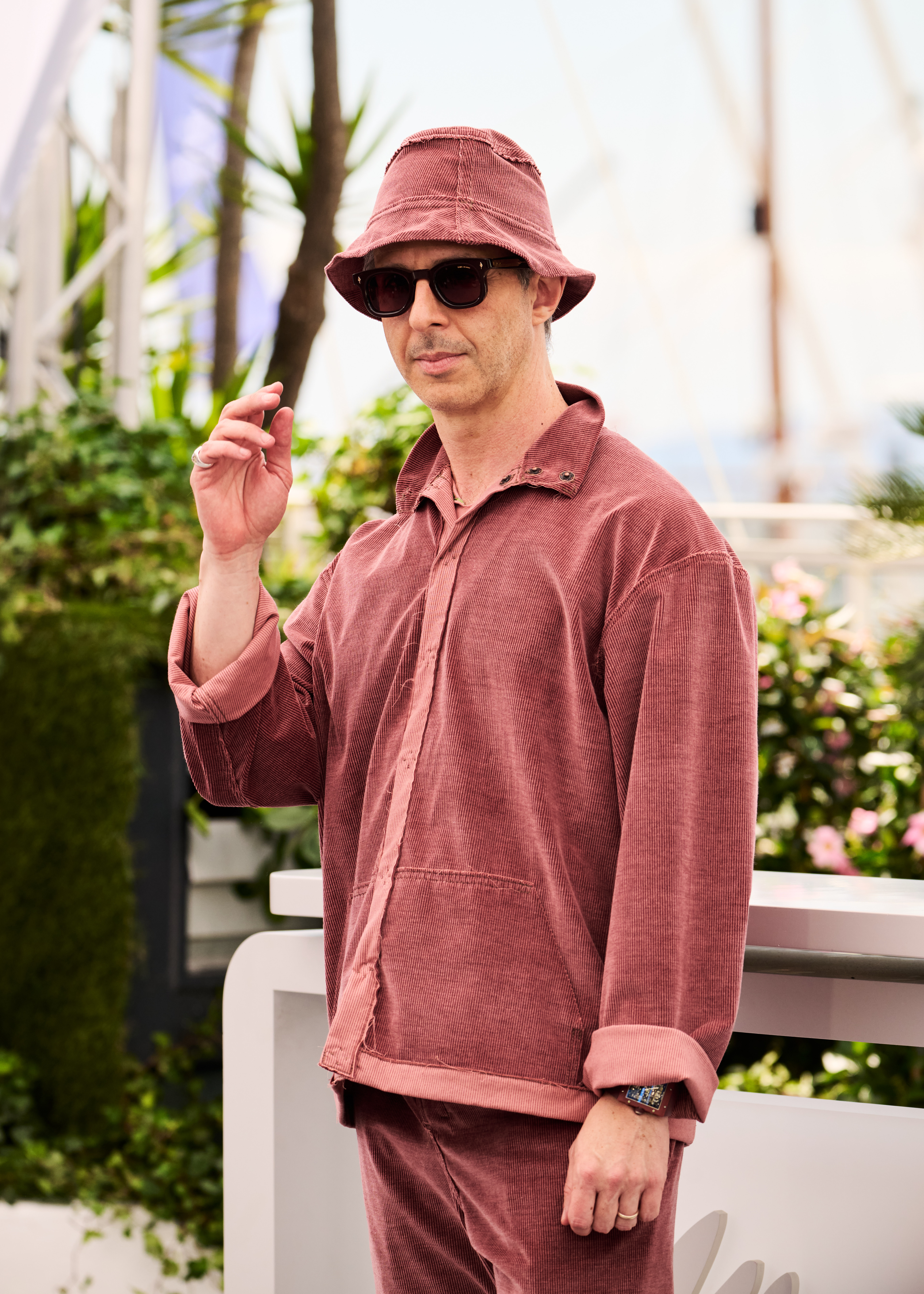
Strong at the Cannes Film Festival in 2025

On Succession, Strong intentionally deepened his alienation from the rest of the cast by timing his visits to the makeup trailer to be the only one there at the time. His costar Culkin described Strong as being in "a bubble" before shoots: "It's hard for me to actually describe his process because I don't really see it". Culkin has stated that Strong's methods are not intrusive to his own process. Matthew Macfadyen described Strong's techniques as "not the main event... That's not to say that's wrong. That's just not useful". Brian Cox, who portrayed Strong's character's father on the show, expressed his concerns that Strong's intense approach to acting may lead to early burnout. However, he added that Strong's performance "is always extraordinary and excellent". During the shooting of The Big Short, Strong similarly reduced the interactions with his cast mates, although he admitted to having a good time, he also found it to be "distracting" and "depleting," recalling, "These guys can all be in a comedy, but I need to feel like I’m in a global warming catastrophe documentary."

Similar to method acting, Strong uses the term "identity diffusion" to describe his technique because he does not draw on his own life experience. "If I have any method at all, it is simply this: to clear away anything—anything—that is not the character and the circumstances of the scene... And usually that means clearing away almost everything around and inside you, so that you can be a more complete vessel for the work at hand". He quoted jazz pianist Keith Jarrett to explain his approach to acting: "I connect every music-making experience I have, including every day here in the studio, with a great power, and if I do not surrender to it nothing happens". Strong admits the intensity he brings to his work might cause him problems, and he has stated "I don't know if I even believe in balance... I believe in extremity". His wife has stated that "He does a really good job of maintaining what he's doing but also creating a space for the family and a normal life".

Strong has noted a preference for films based on actual events, such as Selma, Detroit, and The Trial of the Chicago 7, saying he "never wanted anything more than to be part of telling stories that feel meaningful, films about social justice in particular."

Along with Day-Lewis, Hoffman, and Pacino, Strong has mentioned Hopkins, Denzel Washington, Isabelle Huppert, Meryl Streep, Philip Seymour Hoffman, Ben Kingsley, Laurence Olivier, Robert Duvall, Ian Holm, and Kenneth Branagh as his influences.

== Personal life ==
In 2016, Strong married Emma Wall, a Danish psychiatrist and documentary filmmaker; they met four years earlier at a party in New York City during Hurricane Sandy. They have three daughters. They live in New York and have homes in Copenhagen and Tisvilde. Strong has said he is an irreligious person.

== Acting credits ==
Key
†	Denotes works that have not yet been released

=== Film ===
Year	Title	Role	Notes	Ref.
2008	Humboldt County	Peter		
2008	The Happening	Private Auster		
2009	The Messenger	Return soldier		
2009	Kill Daddy Good Night	Bruce		
2009	Contact High	Carlos		
2010	The Romantics	Pete		
2010	Yes	Man	Short film	
2011	Love Is Like Life But Longer	Blind man	Short film	
2012	Lincoln	John George Nicolay		
2012	Robot & Frank	Jake		
2012	Please, Alfonso	Alfonso	Short film	
2012	See Girl Run	Brandon		
2012	Zero Dark Thirty	Thomas		
2013	Parkland	Lee Harvey Oswald		
2014	The Judge	Dale Palmer		
2014	Time Out of Mind	Jack		
2014	Selma	James Reeb		
2015	Black Mass	Josh Bond		
2015	The Big Short	Vincent 'Vinny' Daniel		
2017	Detroit	Attorney Lang		
2017	Molly's Game	Dean Keith		
2019	Serenity	Reid Miller		
2019	The Gentlemen	Matthew Berger		
2020	The Trial of the Chicago 7	Jerry Rubin		
2022	Armageddon Time	Irving Graff		
2024	The Apprentice	Roy Cohn		
2025	Springsteen: Deliver Me from Nowhere	Jon Landau		
2026	The Social Reckoning	Mark Zuckerberg		

=== Television ===
Year	Title	Role	Notes
2011–2013	The Good Wife	Matt Becker	5 episodes
2013	Mob City	Mike Hendry	4 episodes
2016	Masters of Sex	Art Dreesen	9 episodes
2018–2023	Succession	Kendall Roy	Main role; 39 episodes
TBA	The Boys from Brazil †	Yakov Liebermann	Main role; 5 episodes
TBA	The Best of Us †	Jason Smith	Main role; 6 episodes

=== Theater ===
Year	Production	Role	Venue	Ref.
2004	Haroun and the Sea of Stories	Mr. Sengupta / Khattam-Shud / Walrus	Williamstown Theatre Festival	
2005	Defiance	PFC Evan Davis	Hallie Flanagan Davis Powerhouse Theater	
2006	Defiance	PFC Evan Davis	Manhattan Theatre Club, Off-Broadway	
2006	Frank's Home	William	Playwrights Horizons, Off-Broadway	
2007	New Jerusalem	Baruch Spinoza	Classic Stage Company, Off-Broadway	
2008	A Man for All Seasons	Richard Rich	American Airlines Theatre, Broadway	
2009	Our House	Merv	Playwrights Horizons, Off-Broadway	
2010	The Coward	Lucidus Culling	The Duke on 42nd Street, Off-Broadway	
2011	The Hallway Trilogy	Lucas	Rattlestick Playwrights Theater	
2012	A Month in the Country	Mikhail Alexandrovitch Rakitin	Williamstown Theatre Festival	
2012	The Great God Pan	Jamie	Playwrights Horizons, Off-Broadway	
2024	An Enemy of the People	Doctor Thomas Stockmann	Circle in the Square Theatre, Broadway	

== Awards and nominations ==
Strong has received numerous accolades over his career for his roles on stage and screen. For his role as Kendall Roy in the HBO drama series Succession (2018–2023) he received a Primetime Emmy Award, a Golden Globe Award, and a Critics' Choice Television Award as Best Lead Actor in a Drama Series, in addition to two Actor Award for Outstanding Performance by an Ensemble in a Drama Series. For his role as Doctor Thomas Stockmann in the Broadway revival of the Henrik Ibsen play An Enemy of the People he received the Tony Award for Best Leading Actor in a Play. Most recently he was nominated as Best Supporting Actor for an Academy Award, a BAFTA Award, Actor Award and a Golden Globe Award for his role as Roy Cohn in The Apprentice.

== See also ==
- List of actors with Academy Award nominations
- List of Jewish Academy Award winners and nominees
- List of Primetime Emmy Award winners
- List of Golden Globe winners
