= All the Bells Say =

- Succession episode
- Episode no.: Season 3 Episode 9
- Directed by: Mark Mylod
- Written by: Jesse Armstrong
- Cinematography by: Patrick Capone
- Original air date: December 12, 2021
- Running time: 66 minutes

Guest appearances
- Hiam Abbass as Marcia Roy; Harriet Walter as Lady Caroline Collingwood; Alexander Skarsgård as Lukas Matsson; Pip Torrens as Peter Munion; Scott Nicholson as Colin; Zoë Winters as Kerry; Dasha Nekrasova as Comfry; Ella Rumpf as the contessa; Tomas Arana as Laurie; Quentin Morales as Iverson Roy; Swayam Bhatia as Sophie Roy

Episode chronology
← Previous "Chiantishire"	Next → "The Munsters"
- Succession season 3

"All the Bells Say" is the ninth and final episode of the third season of the American satirical comedy-drama television series Succession, and the 29th episode overall. It was written by series creator Jesse Armstrong and directed by Mark Mylod, and originally aired on HBO on December 12, 2021.

Succession centers on the Roy family, the owners of global media and entertainment conglomerate Waystar RoyCo, and their fight for control of the company amidst uncertainty about the health of the family's patriarch Logan (Brian Cox). The episode is set in Tuscany during the wedding of Caroline Collingwood (Harriet Walter), Roy's ex-wife and the mother of his three youngest children Kendall (Jeremy Strong), Shiv (Sarah Snook) and Roman (Kieran Culkin), and follows the latter three grappling with their futures amidst Logan's negotiations with GoJo, which stand to determine the fate of Waystar.

"All the Bells Say" received widespread acclaim from critics, who praised its writing, performances, and dramatic tension. In particular, Kendall’s confession to Shiv and Roman regarding his part in a young man's death, (Note: As seen in "Nobody Is Ever Missing".) and the episode's climax in which the three come together to face their father, were singled out as two of the best scenes in the entire series. Out of the twenty-five Primetime Emmy Award nominations received by Succession for its third season, six specifically went to the episode, more than for any other, including Outstanding Directing for a Drama Series and three acting nominations; it won Outstanding Writing for a Drama Series for Armstrong and Outstanding Supporting Actor in a Drama Series for Matthew Macfadyen's performance as Tom Wambsgans.

== Plot ==
Kendall is recovering after nearly drowning in the pool. Gerri reports that, due to heavy fines from the DOJ and Lukas Matsson's manipulation of the market, GoJo's market capitalization has exceeded Waystar's. Logan and Roman travel to Matsson's villa to meet with him in person; Matsson proposes that they reverse the deal, with GoJo buying out Waystar and Matsson as CEO – while Logan exits with a settlement along with continued control of key assets. Logan declines, but he stays to negotiate further while Roman goes back to the wedding.

In Tuscany, Roman, Shiv and Connor sit down for an intervention with Kendall, believing that his near-drowning was a suicide attempt, but Kendall dismisses their concerns, insisting that it was an accident. Upon learning of Logan's plans for a merger with GoJo – which could jeopardize his presidential campaign – and hearing Kendall refer to himself as Logan's "eldest son," Connor lashes out at his siblings for constantly snubbing him. Upon hearing of Connor's woes, Willa accepts his marriage proposal. (Note: As seen in "Chiantishire".) Karl and Frank arrive in Italy to help Logan with the GoJo deal. Greg and Roman compete to pursue an Italian contessa, who is a friend of the bride's extended family.

During the wedding reception, Roman – noticing odd behavior from Gerri, Kerry and others amid apparent concerns over the GoJo deal – tells an angry Shiv about Matsson's proposal to buy Waystar. Suspecting that Logan may sell the company after all, the two inform Kendall, realizing that giving Matsson control of the company's board severely endangers their prospects of ever taking over as CEO. Kendall, overwhelmed, breaks down in tears over his failure as both a father to his children and as a whistleblower against the company, and finally admits his involvement in the waiter's death at Shiv's wedding. (Note: As seen in "Nobody Is Ever Missing".) Shiv and Roman comfort him, and Roman suggests that Kendall does not deserve to be fully blamed for the accident.

The three siblings recall a clause in Logan and Caroline's divorce agreement granting the children a vote over any change in company control. They decide to band together, forming a majority voting bloc against Logan. On the road, Shiv relays their plans to Tom, who realizes that Shiv has not considered where he will fall under this alliance. Tom vaguely hints to Greg about major changes happening at Waystar and offers him a "deal with the devil". Greg, though reluctant at first, accepts.

The children arrive at Logan's villa to confront their father. Logan refuses to halt the sale, insisting that the time is right to sell Waystar to a "serious tech operation" like GoJo. The three hold firm against Logan's attempts to divide them; Logan argues that the siblings losing company control will be a teachable moment for them, and erupts in anger when Shiv mentions the supermajority clause. He puts Caroline on the phone, revealing the two renegotiated their divorce agreement to deprive the children of their voting power, effectively leaving them powerless to stop the sale. Roman begs his father to reconsider, but Logan declares that the deal is settled because it ultimately works in his own favor. Roman then pleads with Gerri to oppose Logan and help the siblings remove him but she declines, declaring the buyout to be in her best interest financially. Tom arrives at the villa shortly after and attempts to comfort Shiv, who silently realizes that Tom sabotaged the siblings by informing Logan of their plan.

== Production ==
"All the Bells Say" was written by Succession creator and showrunner Jesse Armstrong and directed by Mark Mylod in his twelfth episode for the series. Like the previous two season finales, as well as the series finale, the episode's title derives from a line in John Berryman's "Dream Song 29".

=== Writing ===
Mylod characterized the episode's climax – which sees Kendall, Roman and Shiv take a stand against Logan – as a bookend to the "chaos at the end of episode two" (which sees the Roy siblings disbanded), stating, "the siblings, however damaged, found their way back together for the first time [...] since their teenage years, I think." Armstrong described Roman's decision to stand up to his father in the episode as a progression from his refusal to do so in the episode "Which Side Are You On?" from the first season. He remarked, "Some people would see growth... I'm on the fence about human beings, and people certainly change what they do, but in my view, people's essential selves don't change. In a way that's what makes drama and choices interesting."

Brian Lowry of CNN compared Logan's decision to sell the company to the acquisition of 21st Century Fox by Disney, writing: "Although series creator Jesse Armstrong has stressed that Rupert Murdoch and his clan aren't the sole inspiration for the series, it's worth noting that Murdoch made his own stunning deal in 2019 to sell major assets to Disney, retaining control of others. Given that Matsson floated the possibility of leaving Logan a few key baubles, there's little to fear of him being idle in the seasons to come, however many that might be." Armstrong himself cited AT&T's 2018 acquisition of HBO's parent company WarnerMedia – as well as the preceding AOL Time Warner merger of 2001 – as inspirations for the storyline, while also admitting to the Disney-Murdoch comparison.

=== Filming ===
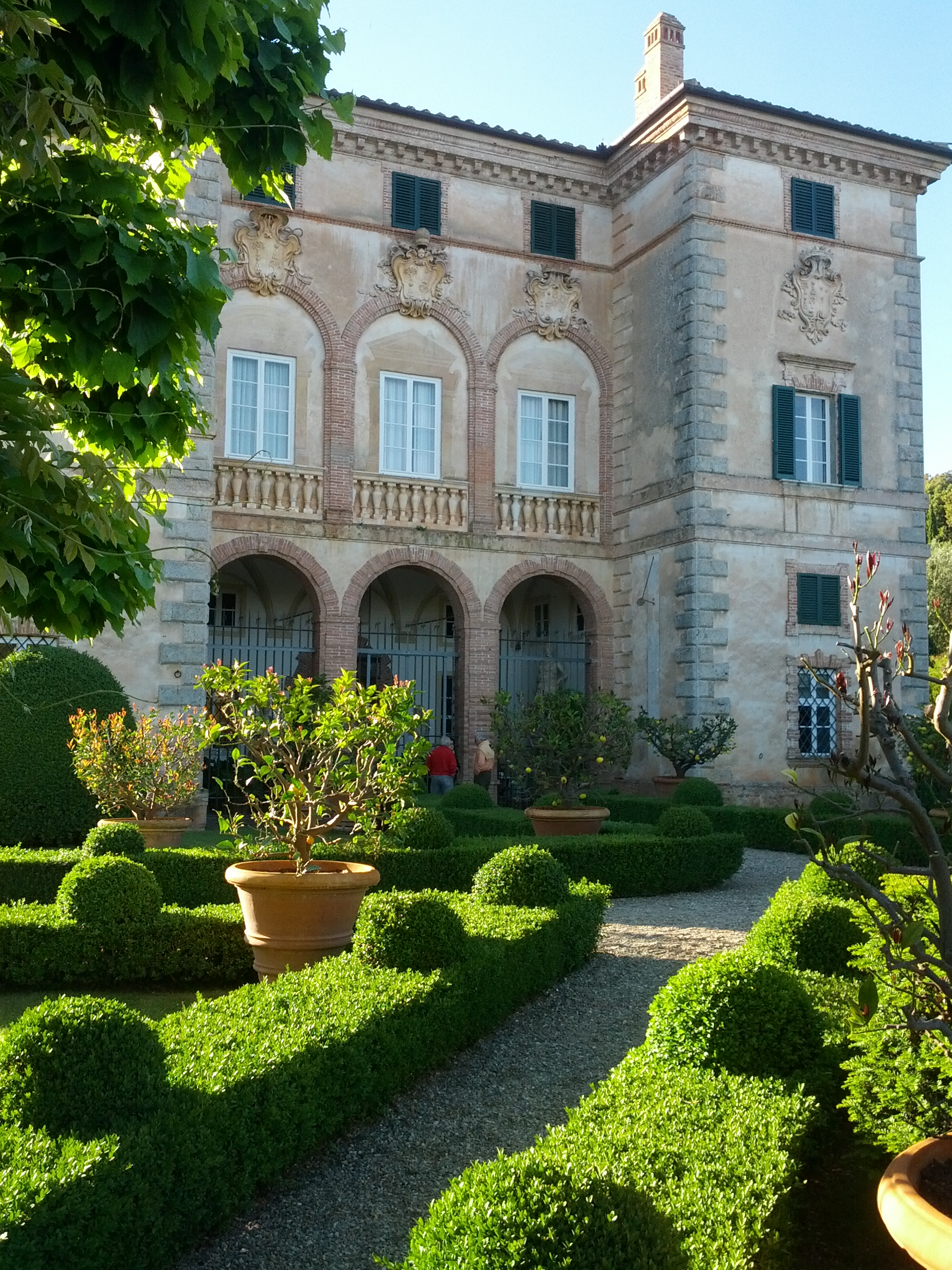
Villa Cetinale in Sovicille, Tuscany served as the venue for Caroline's wedding in the episode.

The series filmed on location in Italy from June to August 2021 for the final two episodes of the season, primarily in the Tuscan region of Val d'Orcia, as well as several surrounding comuni in the province of Siena. For the finale, Villa Cetinale in Sovicille was used as Caroline's wedding venue, while the four Roy siblings' "intervention" discussion at the beginning of the episode was filmed at the restaurant La Terrazza del Chiostro in Pienza. The winery Argiano in Montalcino stood in for Logan's villa where the episode's climactic showdown between Logan and his children takes place. The crew shot several variations of the ending, including takes where Shiv does not notice Tom's betrayal. Mylod recounted how the process of filming the scene was instrumental in determining the end of the season:

For a long time, I couldn't find the ending. And then we did a take where we gave Sarah's character time to process that moment. And when Tom walked over and said, "you okay?", despite that absolutely extraordinary betrayal, [Shiv] put a game face on and said "yep." (...) It was such a perfect kind of Succession moment. That she would still somehow find the strength to put that Teflon coat on and be in denial of that pain was so powerful to me, that I knew we had the end of the season.

— Mark Mylod

Actor Brian Cox recalled in an interview with The Hollywood Reporter that several scenes were cut from the episode due to time constraints, including "a brilliant scene with Peter Friedman [who plays Frank Vernon] where he tells Roman what's what" during the episode's final sequence. He remarked, "I think they could have gone to an hour and a half with that [episode], but they had to edit it. And they might have even got a 10th episode, I don't know. There was certainly a lot of material that we sadly lost."

== Reception ==
=== Ratings ===
Upon airing, the episode was watched by 0.634 million viewers, with an 18-49 rating of 0.13. Including viewership across all platforms, the episode received 1.7 million viewers.

=== Critical reception ===
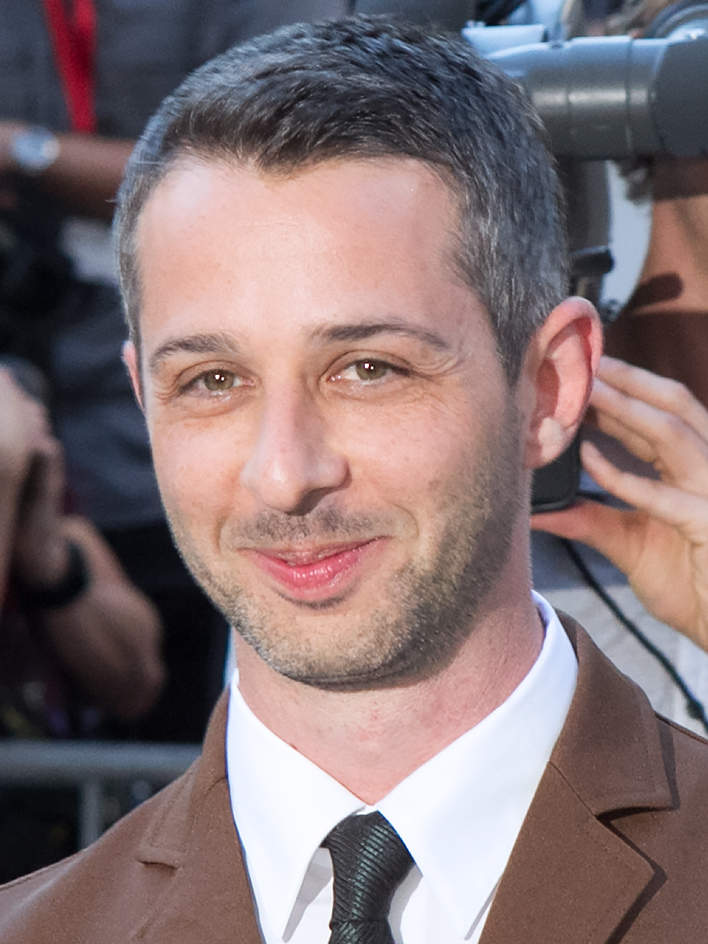
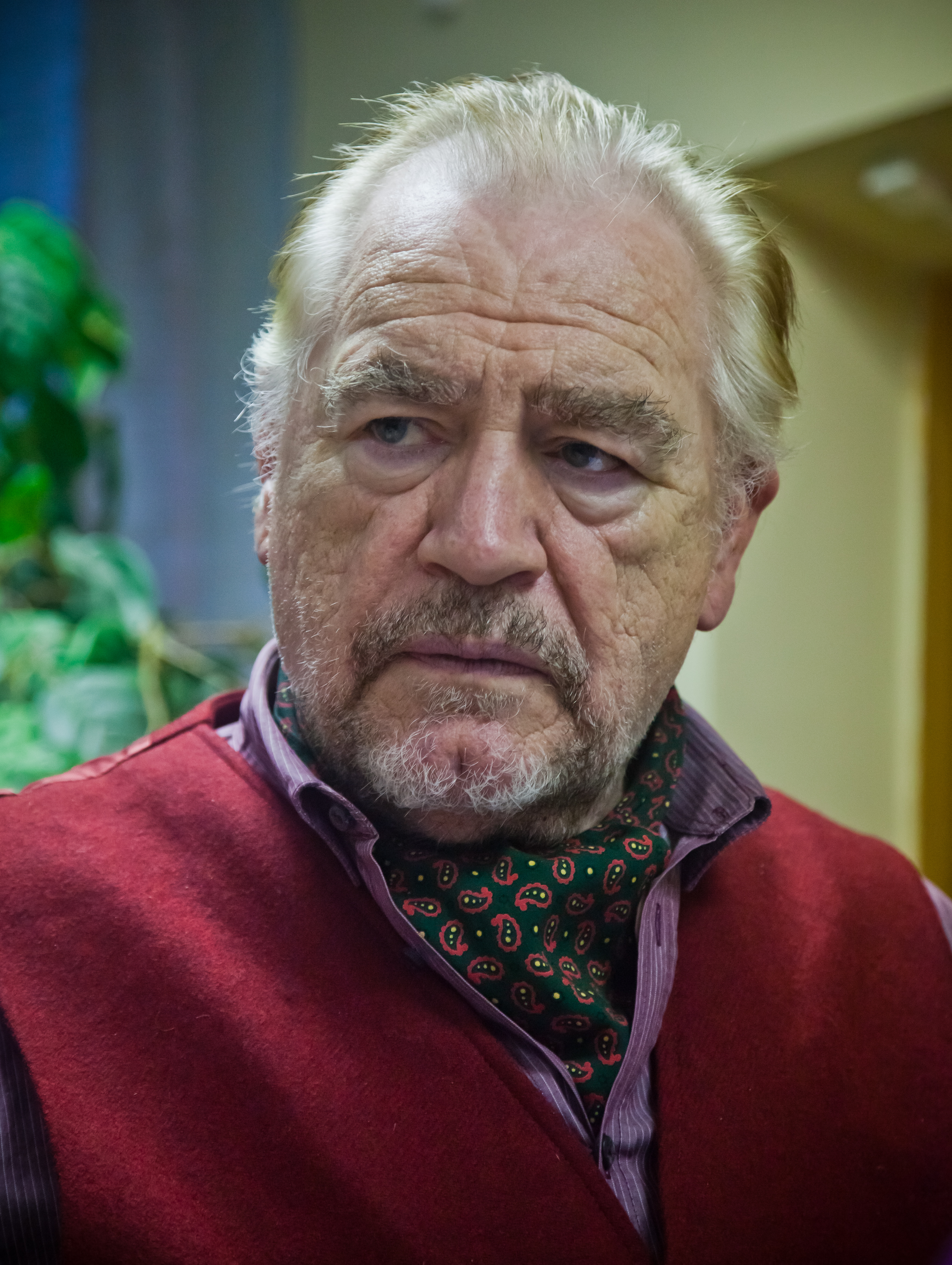
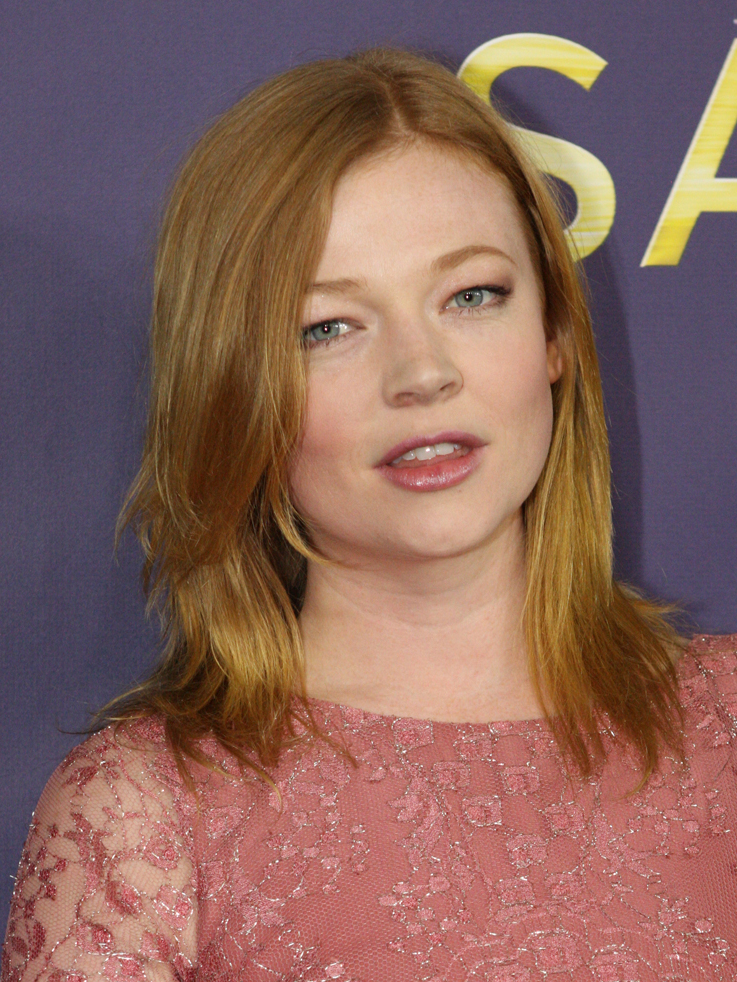
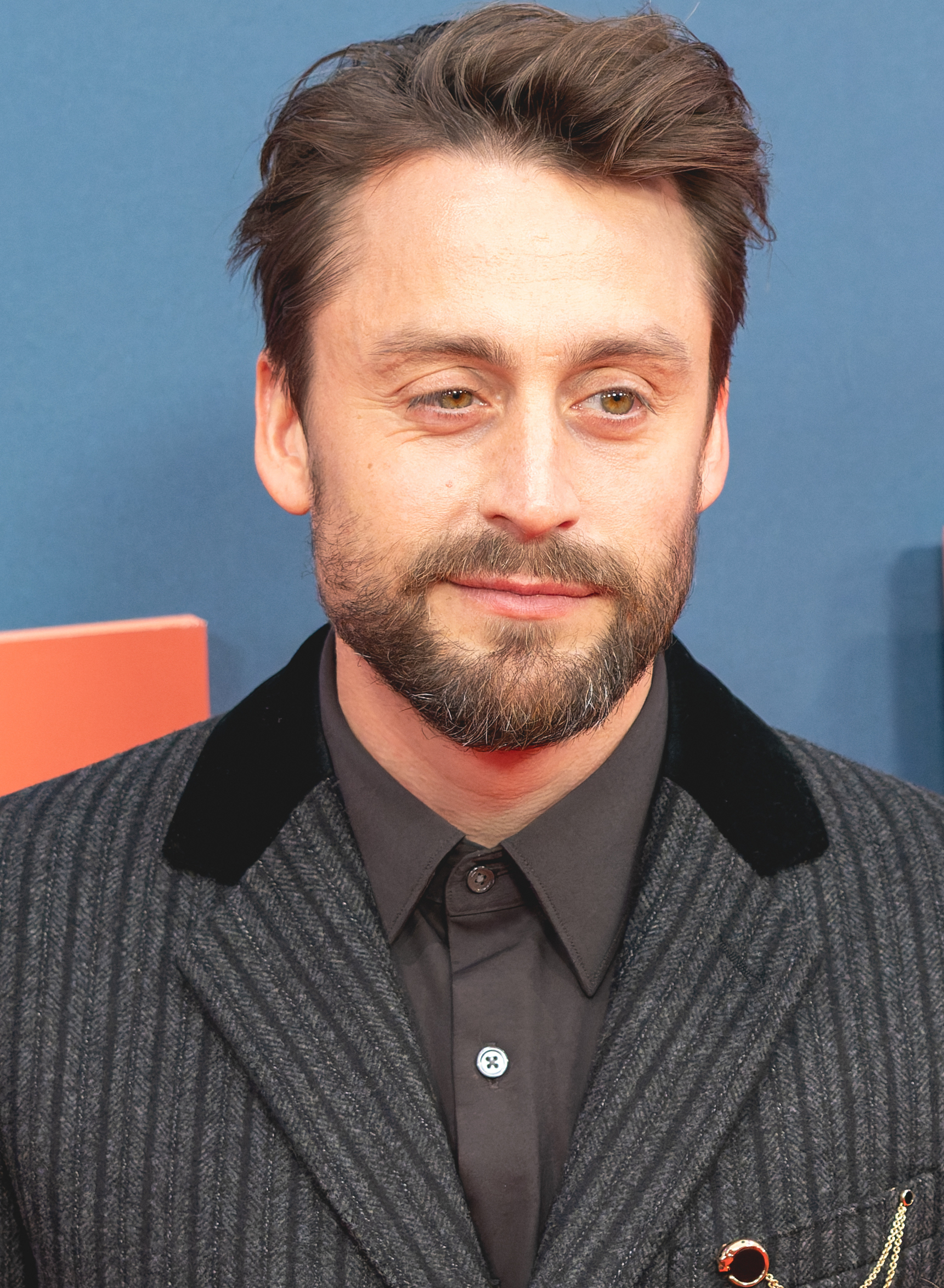
The performances of (top, L to R) Jeremy Strong, Brian Cox, Sarah Snook and Kieran Culkin were widely praised by critics.

"All the Bells Say" was universally acclaimed by critics, who praised the episode's script, dramatic tension, performances (particularly Jeremy Strong's), and conclusion to the season's narrative. On the review aggregator website Rotten Tomatoes, the episode has an approval rating of 100% with an average score of 9.80 out of 10, based on 14 reviews. The site's critical consensus reads: "All the Bells Say" wraps up Succession's third season with a brilliantly written, powerfully acted bang – and leaves fans on the edge of their seats waiting for Season Four.

Ashley Ray-Harris of The A.V. Club gave the episode an A, stating that it "feature[d] Emmy-worthy moments for Jeremy Strong, Brian Cox, Kieran Culkin and Sarah Snook". She also praised Mark Mylod's direction, suggesting that the episode was the series' "most beautiful" to date, and called the episode's climax a "masterclass". Noel Murray of The New York Times felt the episode gained much of its quality from depicting the Roy siblings "in the same space, talking out their problems in person". He wrote that "the energy crackles among these actors, as their characters swing between being playfully mean and unforgivably cruel". Murray also praised Cox's "terrific" performance throughout the episode, particularly in the scene where he negotiates with Matsson. Ben Travers of IndieWire particularly praised the episode's twist involving Tom – feeling it a satisfying culmination of his character arc throughout the season – and likened Kendall's confession scene to "watching the three parts of Succession negotiate for space". He gave the episode an A.

Several critics singled out Strong's performance for praise, specifically during the scene where Kendall confesses his role in the fatal car accident from the first season to his siblings. Giving the episode 5 out of 5 stars, Scott Tobias of Vulture wrote of Strong's performance in the confession scene: "It all comes out in a torrent of raw emotion, courtesy of a serious actor who does not believe himself to be the star of a comedy." He also highlighted the episode's ending, calling it "as gripping a sequence of events as the show has ever staged". He declared the episode overall a "masterfully orchestrated finale". Jen Chaney, also writing for Vulture, called the episode "fantastically tense" and reserved similar praise for Strong, writing: "His performance here just punches you right in the heart." Emily Yahr of The Washington Post also advocated for Strong to win an Emmy Award for his performance in the episode.

Other critics focused on how the episode excelled despite being emblematic of the third season's repetitive structure. Sophie Gilbert of The Atlantic, who had previously criticized the first seven episodes of the season for feeling "stuck" in the same character dynamics, declared that the finale was "both brilliant television and a patchwork of things the show has already done". She wrote: "The show's cyclical nature feels, at this point, like a kind of nihilist acceptance: Late capitalism will always insulate the extraordinarily privileged from real consequences, and so the best we can do is voyeuristically enjoy their misery along the way. But with acting like this, does it matter?" Alan Sepinwall of Rolling Stone wrote that despite the season ending "with a minor variation on an old theme," the episode "was everything Succession does well — much of it done better than the series ever has before". Sepinwall highlighted the episode's balance of comedy and drama, describing the first half as "one delightful comic vignette after another" and praising Nicholas Braun's "sparkling" line delivery, while calling attention to Culkin and Snook's performances opposite Strong during Kendall's confession scene. Travers wrote: "Therein lies the beauty of Succession Season 3: For all the complaints about it being repetitive... its emotional arcs are incredibly precise, pointed, and harrowing."

=== Accolades ===
At the 74th Directors Guild of America Awards, Mark Mylod won the Directors Guild of America Award for Outstanding Directing – Drama Series for his work on the episode.

Furthermore, at the 74th Primetime Emmy Awards, Matthew Macfadyen won the Outstanding Supporting Actor in a Drama Series and Jesse Armstrong won Outstanding Writing for a Drama Series for the episode. "All the Bells Say" also received nominations Outstanding Directing for a Drama Series, Outstanding Guest Actor in a Drama Series for Alexander Skarsgård's performance, and Outstanding Single-Camera Picture Editing for a Drama Series. Brian Cox submitted this episode for consideration to support his Outstanding Lead Actor in a Drama Series nomination.
