= Logan Roy =

Fictional character from Succession

- Succession character
- Brian Cox as Logan Roy
- First appearance: "Celebration" (2018)
- Last appearance: "With Open Eyes" (2023)
- Created by: Jesse Armstrong
- Portrayed by: Brian Cox

In-universe information
- Titles: CEO of Waystar RoyCo (season 1-3); Chairman of Waystar RoyCo (season 3-4)
- Occupation: Businessman
- Affiliation: Waystar RoyCo
- Family: Helen Roy (mother; deceased); Ewan Roy (brother); Rose Roy (sister; deceased)
- Spouses: Unnamed first wife (divorced); Caroline Collingwood (divorced); Marcia Roy (estranged)
- Significant other: Kerry Castellabate (lover)
- Children: Connor Roy (son); Kendall Roy (son); Roman Roy (son); Siobhan "Shiv" Roy (daughter)
- Relatives: Noah (uncle); Greg Hirsch (grand-nephew); Marianne Hirsch (niece); Tom Wambsgans (son-in-law); Willa Ferreyra (daughter-in-law); Sophie Roy (granddaughter); Iverson Roy (grandson)
- Origin: Dundee, Scotland
- Nationality: Scottish-American
- Home: Manhattan, New York City, United States

Logan Roy is a fictional character and one of the main characters of the American HBO satirical dark comedy-drama television series Succession. He is portrayed by Brian Cox and was created by showrunner Jesse Armstrong. Armstrong initially conceived the series as a feature film about the Murdoch family. He later decided to create a new script centered on original characters, with Logan being loosely based on Rupert Murdoch and Sumner Redstone.

Logan Roy is the self-made billionaire founder of media and entertainment conglomerate Waystar RoyCo and the patriarch of the Roy family. He is a harsh leader who primarily focuses on his company rather than his four children Connor, Kendall, Roman and Siobhan. He is distrustful of his children and his subordinates, refusing to step down as CEO at the start of the series despite his advanced age as well as health. His conflicts with his family, his employees at Waystar, other businesses, and the United States Department of Justice form the central story-line of the series.

The character and Brian Cox's performance has been critically acclaimed, and has been cited as one of the best villains and characters in television. For his performance, Cox won the Golden Globe Award for Best Actor in a Drama Series and was nominated for three Primetime Emmy Awards for Outstanding Lead Actor in a Drama Series.

== Development ==
=== Casting and creation ===
"I don't defend Logan in any way. One of the jobs as an actor is we cannot judge our characters. He is a misanthrope [who] is very disappointed with the human experiment."

— Brian Cox

Logan Roy's character was heavily influenced both by powerful real-world figures and prior performances in Shakespearean dramas by Cox. Opposite to his children's privileged upbringing, Logan comes from a working-class background, with Cox describing him as coming from "a different generation and has a different set of values." Cox has noted that portraying Logan gave him the habit of frequently using profanity in his everyday life. In contrast to the vigorous routine done by his co-star Jeremy Strong, Cox has dismissed the concept of method acting in preparation for his roles, calling it "bollocks."

=== Characterization ===
Cox described Logan Roy as a "mysterious character in many ways. I have a lot of empathy for him. I think he's very misunderstood. I think he's a tragic figure", and compared him to Shakespeare's tragic kings, such as Henry IV. "Obviously there's Lear connotations, but it's also the father dealing with a child in his son Hal and not understanding him." David Rasche, who plays Karl Muller, suggested to Jesse Armstrong that his character became a confessor to Logan, "But I don't think Jesse wanted that. Jesse wanted Logan Roy, a man alone." Cox thinks of Logan as "quite Puritan [...] Logan's a bastard, but he's not an indecent bastard." On Logan's romantic relationships he has said "He clearly loves Marcia. There's this idea that he had this affair with Rhea, but I'm not sure that happened. Both Holly [Hunter] and I felt that hadn't actually happened, [...] The kids thinking they were having an affair was more them projecting", but also added that "he's not good at relationships at all. The female relationships in his life have been pretty disastrous". By the final season Cox noted that, Colin and Kerry, Logan's bodyguard and assistant respectively, were "the two people who matter to him most."

Cox has expressed that he believes that Logan's greatest weakness was that "he loves his children desperately." In interviews with The New Yorker, Armstrong agreed with Cox that Logan loves his children, even if he had done "things which are antithetical to what most people would consider to be love."

== Character biography ==
=== Early life ===
Logan Roy's early life is elaborated in an animation made for the episode "Dundee" that was eventually cut and replaced by a scene where Kendall performs a rap song exalting his father. Roy was born on 29 October in Dundee, Scotland, United Kingdom in 1938, in a working-class family. His father died from a brain hemorrhage several years later. During World War II, he was sent with his older brother Ewan to live with his uncle Noah in Quebec, Canada. In the episode "Church and State," Ewan recalls in a eulogy that during the journey, the two brothers were stranded at sea after their ship's engines had failed. Fearing attacks by German submarines, the two did not speak or move for three days. While Logan was enrolled at a boarding school, his baby sister, Rose, arrived to Canada. After falling ill and returning home, Rose died of polio, which would cause immense guilt for the rest of Logan's life as he believed he was responsible. In the episode "Austerlitz," he claims that Noah was physically abusive towards him throughout his childhood, which is indicated by scars across Logan's back.

=== Appearances ===
==== Season 1 ====
At the beginning of the series, the Roys gather to celebrate Logan's 80th birthday, where it is assumed he will step down as CEO and name Kendall as his successor. However, he shocks his family when he announces he will stay on as CEO and hands them documents naming Marcia as his chief trustee upon his death. Logan suffers a debilitating stroke later that day and is admitted to the hospital, where the rest of his family and inner circle debate how to steward the company while he is incapacitated. Logan soon recovers and announces at a gala event that he will remain CEO, but continues displaying erratic behavior. Kendall plots a vote of no confidence against his father along with Roman and several members of the company's senior management, but it ultimately fails, in part because Logan refuses to leave the room during the vote and instead berates several board members into siding with him, while firing everyone who voted for the motion (including Kendall).

Over the following months, Logan remains at odds with his children: Shiv goes to work as a political consultant for presidential candidate Gil Eavis, a Democratic Senator who despises Logan and Waystar, while Kendall - a recovering addict - relapses and derails a family therapy session intended to allay public concerns over the company's stability. At Shiv's wedding, Logan learns that Kendall has plotted a hostile takeover of the company alongside his friend Stewy and Logan's nemesis Sandy Furness. After a drug-addled Kendall suffers a car accident that results in the death of a caterer from the wedding, Logan covers up Kendall's involvement and uses the crime as leverage to force him to back down from the takeover. A traumatized Kendall becomes fiercely loyal to Logan, who uses his subservient son to help him combat the takeover bid.

==== Season 2 ====
With Stewy and Sandy's takeover bid shoring up shareholder support, Logan's financier and close associates all advise that he sell the company, citing the declining relevance of legacy media in the 21st-century corporate landscape. Logan steadfastly refuses to give up his empire and decides to acquire rival news conglomerate Pierce Global Media (PGM), hoping to make Waystar too large for competitors to buy out. However, the deal falls through after the publication of a major news story exposing Waystar's decades-long cover-up of sexual exploitation on the company's cruise lines. Pierce's CEO Rhea Jarrell remains loyal to Logan after being fired from PGM and helps him navigate the company through the scandal; Logan becomes infatuated with her and eventually names her his successor, alienating Marcia. After a company whistleblower goes public with further details on the scandal, the Roys are called to testify before the Senate. Logan realizes that in order to appease the company's shareholders, he must publicly sacrifice someone close to him as a scapegoat for the scandal. Though the shareholders advise that Logan take responsibility, Logan instead chooses Kendall, who was acting CEO when the scandal was being covered up. Kendall obliges, but reverses course during a press conference the next morning by naming his father responsible for the company's historic complicity in the crimes.

==== Season 3 ====
In the wake of Kendall's announcement, Logan temporarily steps back as CEO (appointing Gerri as his interim placement), negotiates a settlement with Marcia to ensure her cooperation, and names Shiv Waystar's President of Domestic Operations. Logan experiences a resurgence in health complications upon returning to New York, forcing his children to make a settlement with Sandy and Stewy without his input during the company's annual shareholder meeting. After Waystar and the Department of Justice also reach a settlement, Logan attempts to acquire streaming giant GoJo, but the company's CEO Lukas Matsson instead proposes the opposite, assuring Logan he will continue to control key assets. Logan decides to take up Matsson's offer without consulting his children, whose chances of leading the company are jeopardized with Matsson in control. Kendall, Shiv and Roman attempt to veto their father's decision via their stake in the family holding company. However, Logan and Caroline renegotiate their divorce settlement in time to deprive the children of their voting power, effectively leaving them powerless within the company. Tom is revealed to have tipped off Logan on his children's revolt.

==== Season 4 ====
Months later, Logan remains estranged from his children. On the eve of the GoJo acquisition, Sandi and Stewy convince the siblings to delay the board vote to increase the price of the sale, forcing Logan to attempt reconciliation with his children. Kendall and Shiv refuse to budge, unsuccessfully demanding an apology from their father for his betrayal and his cruel parenting. Logan is then left no choice but to go to Sweden to renegotiate the deal with Matsson, but he suddenly dies on the flight from a pulmonary embolism, with only Tom and some of his other senior team by his side. Tom phones the children - who are attending Connor's wedding - to give them a chance to say goodbye. The plane is turned around and Logan is pronounced dead on arrival; the siblings make a statement announcing his death to the press, then watch as his body is removed from the plane.

During Logan's wake, an undated document is found in his safe naming Kendall his successor upon his death, with several pencil addenda included, including a strike on "Kendall Roy" that could be either underlining or crossing-out the name. Kendall and Roman eventually decide to run the company together as co-CEOs, since the company's succession plan formally dictated leadership be passed down to COO - Roman's role at the time. Following his death, Logan appears posthumously in two recordings - the first for the assisted living community Living+ and the second an archival recording of a dinner party with his employees and Connor, of which his children Kendall, Roman, and Shiv become emotional upon viewing.

== Reception ==
=== Accolades ===
Cox's performance in the role has received massive acclaim from critics, having won the Golden Globe Award for Best Actor – Television Series Drama in 2020, as well as a nomination for the same award in 2022, losing to series co-star Jeremy Strong. He has also received nominations for the Primetime Emmy Award for Outstanding Lead Actor in a Drama Series in 2020, 2022, and 2024, the Critics' Choice Television Award for Best Actor in a Drama Series in 2022, the Hollywood Critics Association TV Awards for Best Actor in a Broadcast Network or Cable Series, Drama in 2022, and the Satellite Award for Best Actor – Television Series Drama in 2020 and 2022.

=== Critical reception ===
In New Statesman, Fergal Kinney described Logan as "television's first truly irredeemable leading man," lauding him as a malevolent, ruthless figure rather than a sympathetic anti-hero. Kinney contrasted Logan's actions from Tony Soprano, Walter White, Don Draper, and Omar Little as fundamentally repulsive, receiving no redemption for his dark actions that lead to climate change, civilian death, and mass exploitation. Emily St. James of Vox noted that the monstrosity of Logan's character is critical to the formation of his children, emphasizing how "all they have known is damage."

Cox's performances in multiple episodes were singled out as highlights. In an AV Club review of the episode "Which Side Are You On?", Cox's portrayal of Logan is described as "Trumpian" and "steals the scene." The humiliating game that Logan forces his family to play in "Hunting" has been described as "terrifying" and embelic of his character's cruelty. Cox's penultimate appearance in the series in "Rehearsal" was acclaimed by TVLine as both "summon[ing] a formidable energy" and "revealing just the slightest hint of vulnerability."

Many critics drew comparisons between Logan and the Shakespearean character of King Lear. Obvious similarities between Logan and Lear include them both dividing their possessions to their three children, the siblings being forced to demonstrate their devotion to their father, and the mutual destruction that becomes of their entire family. The Atlantic drew parallels between Logan's abusive form of love for his children with the Lear line "Love's not love / when it is mingled with regards that stand / Aloof from th' entire point." The impossibility of Logan's aspirations was likened to that of Lear's by DePaul Law Review, with both figures simultaneously trying to accept their impeding deaths while refusing to abandon their positions in life.
