= Succession season 1 =

Season of television series

Succession
- Season 1
- Promotional poster
- Showrunner: Jesse Armstrong
- Starring: Hiam Abbass; Nicholas Braun; Brian Cox; Kieran Culkin; Peter Friedman; Natalie Gold; Matthew Macfadyen; Alan Ruck; Parker Sawyers (Note: Pilot only.); Sarah Snook; Jeremy Strong; Rob Yang
- No. of episodes: 10

Release
- Original network: HBO
- Original release: June 3 – August 5, 2018

Season chronology
- Next → Season 2

The first season of the American satirical comedy-drama television series Succession premiered on HBO on June 3, 2018. Series creator Jesse Armstrong serves as the showrunner for the season. The series centers on the Roy family, the owners of global media and entertainment conglomerate Waystar RoyCo, and their fight for control of the company amidst uncertainty about the health of the family's patriarch. The season features an ensemble cast of Hiam Abbass, Nicholas Braun, Brian Cox, Kieran Culkin, Peter Friedman, Natalie Gold, Matthew Macfadyen, Alan Ruck, Parker Sawyers, Sarah Snook, Jeremy Strong and Rob Yang.

In June 2016, HBO gave Succession a pilot order, to be written by Armstrong and directed by executive producer Adam McKay, and was filmed in late 2016. The series was greenlit for a season order in May 2017, which began filming in October 2017, and wrapped in early 2018. The season consists of ten episodes, and received critical acclaim. It was nominated for five Primetime Emmy Awards, and won Outstanding Writing for a Drama Series for the episode "Nobody Is Ever Missing".

== Cast and characters ==
=== Main ===
- Hiam Abbass as Marcia Roy
- Nicholas Braun as Greg Hirsch
- Brian Cox as Logan Roy
- Kieran Culkin as Roman Roy
- Peter Friedman as Frank Vernon
- Natalie Gold as Rava Roy
- Matthew Macfadyen as Tom Wambsgans
- Alan Ruck as Connor Roy
- Parker Sawyers as Alessandro Daniels
- Sarah Snook as Siobhan "Shiv" Roy
- Jeremy Strong as Kendall Roy
- Rob Yang as Lawrence Yee

=== Recurring ===
- Dagmara Domińczyk as Karolina Novotney
- Arian Moayed as Stewy Hosseini
- J. Smith-Cameron as Gerri Kellman
- Justine Lupe as Willa Ferreyra
- David Rasche as Karl Muller
- Swayam Bhatia as Sophie Roy
- Quentin Morales as Iverson Roy
- Molly Griggs as Grace
- Mary Birdsong as Marianne Hirsch
- Judy Reyes as Eva
- Larry Pine as Sandy Furness
- Ashley Zukerman as Nate Sofrelli
- Zack Robidas as Mark Ravenhead
- James Cromwell as Ewan Roy
- Eric Bogosian as Gil Eavis
- Caitlin FitzGerald as Tabitha Hayes
- Harriet Walter as Lady Caroline Collingwood
- Scott Nicholson as Colin Stiles
- Juliana Canfield as Jess Jordan

== Episodes ==
No. overall	No. in season	Title	Directed by	Written by	Original release date	U.S. viewers (millions)
1	1	"Celebration"	Adam McKay	Jesse Armstrong	June 3, 2018	0.582
The Roy family prepare to celebrate the 80th birthday of Logan Roy, CEO of the family-owned media conglomerate Waystar RoyCo. Logan's second-oldest son Kendall believes he will be the company heir following his father's retirement, but Logan announces that he will not be stepping down as CEO. He presents his children with papers giving his third wife, Marcia, two votes on the trust to decide his successor upon his death. During the family's traditional softball game, Logan fires his longtime COO Frank Vernon, and agrees to give a new position to his estranged great-nephew Greg Hirsch, who was fired from Waystar's management training program. Kendall leaves the game to secure Waystar's acquisition of the media startup Vaulter. On the helicopter ride back to New York City, Logan and his children Roman, Shiv, and Connor argue over the terms of the agreement, but Logan suddenly collapses from a hemorrhagic stroke and is rushed to the hospital. Kendall receives word of Logan's stroke from Lawrence Yee, Vaulter's CEO and Kendall's rival, immediately after securing the acquisition deal, and rushes to the hospital.
2	2	"Shit Show at the Fuck Factory"	Mark Mylod	Tony Roche	June 10, 2018	0.491
The Roy children are in disagreement over who should take control of Waystar in the wake of Logan's incapacitation: Roman and Connor want to sign the papers out of respect for their father's wishes, whereas Kendall believes he should become CEO, and Shiv is opposed based on doubts about Marcia's role in the company. Marcia sends Greg to retrieve Logan's items from his apartment. Roman asks Greg to bring the trust change papers, but Shiv instructs the opposite; Greg ultimately decides not to bring the papers. Shiv's boyfriend Tom Wambsgans proposes to her at the hospital, and she accepts. It is eventually agreed that Kendall should become acting CEO of Waystar with Roman as COO. Waystar's general counsel, Gerri Kellman, informs Kendall that Logan is $3 billion in debt due to his expansion into parks. Logan wakes up in his hospital bed.
3	3	"Lifeboats"	Mark Mylod	Jonathan Glatzer	June 17, 2018	0.605
Kendall learns that one of the creditors to Waystar's family holding company is entitled to demand full repayment for Logan's $3 billion debt if Waystar's stock falls below $130 per share. After a failed attempt to negotiate with the bank, Kendall enlists the aid of Stewy Hosseini, his friend from college who is now a private equity investor. Stewy agrees to inject $4 billion into Waystar in return for stock and a seat on the company's board. However, Greg later spots Stewy meeting with Sandy Furness, Logan's enemy who wants to take control of Waystar. Kendall is also trying to repair his marriage with his estranged wife Rava, but after a night together, she confirms she has already hired a divorce lawyer. Shiv asks Nate Sofrelli, a fellow political fixer and former boyfriend, to run a background check on Marcia. Kendall visits a recovering Logan to inform him that Waystar's stock has fallen below $130, but that his efforts have staved off a greater financial decline. Logan nonetheless disapproves.
4	4	"Sad Sack Wasp Trap"	Adam Arkin	Anna Jordan	June 24, 2018	0.543
The Roys prepare for the company's annual foundation gala. Frank is rehired to mentor Roman in his position as COO. Upon starting his new role as the head of the Waystar's Parks and Cruises division, Tom is given secret documents confirming a massive cover-up of crimes committed on the company's cruises, including sexual assault and potential murder. Panicked, he confides this information to Greg. At the charity gala, Connor notices changes in the transcript of Kendall's speech, leading him to mistakenly believe that Kendall plans to announce Logan's retirement. He tells Logan, who opts to make a speech in Kendall's place announcing that he is returning to his role as CEO. Tom plans to go public about the cruises scandal, but Gerri advises against it during the gala. Tom angrily accuses Greg of snitching to Gerri about the scandal, which Greg denies. However, Gerri later thanks Greg in private, confirming that he did disclose the information to her.
5	5	"I Went to Market"	Adam Arkin	Georgia Pritchett	July 1, 2018	0.583
Marcia invites Logan's estranged brother Ewan to Thanksgiving, and Greg travels to Canada to pick Ewan up. Logan wants to aggressively acquire more local news stations for Waystar, against the advice of his children and counsel. Kendall plots to hold a vote of no confidence against his father amidst his erratic behavior. Tom sends Greg to shred company documents pertaining to the cruises scandal, but Greg secretly makes copies. During dinner, an argument erupts between Logan and Ewan over the company and family's values, and Ewan storms out. As he leaves, Kendall suggests the possibility of a company takeover to Ewan, who is on Waystar's board. Ewan refuses to conspire against his own brother and quickly returns to the feast, warning Greg not to trust the Roys. The dinner falls apart after Logan strikes Kendall's son Iverson during a game. Logan's behavior convinces Gerri to support Kendall in his vote of no confidence.
6	6	"Which Side Are You On?"	Andrij Parekh	Susan Soon He Stanton	July 8, 2018	0.673
Kendall, Roman, Frank and Gerri work together to amass a majority vote in favor of removing Logan from his position as CEO. Roman is able to sway Lawrence to their side. Logan travels to Washington, D.C. for a meeting with the President, but the meeting is cancelled last-minute amid concerns regarding a terror threat. Greg is advised by Ewan to stay out of the no-confidence vote, but Greg later discloses his knowledge of the vote to Tom. On the day of the vote, Kendall flies to Long Island to visit an ailing board member at her home to convince her to vote with him, but is unable to take a helicopter back to Manhattan due to a lockdown over the terror threat. He is thereby delayed in his arrival to the vote while stuck in traffic, and Frank begins the vote without him. However, a furious Logan refuses to leave the room during the vote and instead berates several board members (including Roman) to side with him, and fires everyone who voted against him, including Kendall and Frank.
7	7	"Austerlitz"	Miguel Arteta	Lucy Prebble	July 15, 2018	0.626
Kendall has cut off communications with his family and is suing Logan for firing him from Waystar. Tabloids falsely suggest that Kendall, a recovering addict, has relapsed. Logan attempts to repair his public image by holding a weekend family therapy session at Austerlitz, Connor's ranch in New Mexico, which Kendall chooses not to attend. After a fruitless initial session, Shiv leaves to meet with Senator Gil Eavis, a Democratic presidential candidate and Logan's public rival, after Nate persuades her to join him in working on Gil's campaign. Afterwards, she and Nate have a sexual encounter in her car. Kendall eventually does arrive in New Mexico, but chooses to join some locals on a cocaine and methamphetamine binge. Roman brings him back to the ranch, where an argument erupts between Logan and the rest of the family. Logan insults Tom and berates Shiv for meeting with Gil, causing her to leave crying. He also admits to planting the tabloid allegations about Kendall's drug use prior to his actual relapse. The argument nearly turns violent when Kendall dismisses Logan's stories of the abuse he suffered as a child at the hands of his uncle. The next morning, Logan is seen privately swimming, his back covered in severe scarring, attesting to his abuse.
8	8	"Prague"	S. J. Clarkson	Jon Brown	July 22, 2018	0.637
Roman is put in charge of planning Tom's bachelor party. Though he initially wants to host it in Prague, Stewy invites him to a secret underground party held inside an abandoned New York railway station where powerful business and media figures mingle. Logan tasks Greg with ensuring Kendall's safety amid his renewed drug abuse. Tom is initially drawn to the party's unhinged, sexual atmosphere, but he becomes doubtful about his relationship with Shiv, unaware of her ongoing affair with Nate. He is eventually goaded by Roman into having sex with a woman at the party. Shiv meets Logan for dinner, where he implies that he knows of her affair. Shiv, perceiving this as a veiled threat, refuses to stop working for Gil. Marcia later calls Shiv to say that Logan will not be attending Shiv and Tom's wedding. At the party, Kendall meets with Stewy and Sandy, who want to buy out his share in Waystar for half a billion dollars. A vengeful Kendall instead proposes a hostile takeover that will grant them a controlling interest in the company and name him CEO.
9	9	"Pre-Nuptial"	Mark Mylod	Jesse Armstrong	July 29, 2018	0.558
The Roys gather at an English castle in preparation for Shiv and Tom's wedding. Shiv believes Logan will not be present, but Logan chooses to attend to avoid bad publicity. Kendall, Roman and Shiv reunite with their mother Caroline, Logan's second wife. Tom is surprised to find that Tabitha, the woman who performed fellatio on him at his bachelor party, is now dating Roman. Nate meets Tom and hints at his history with Shiv. Tom confronts Shiv about her infidelity, but she denies it and instead asks to know the details of the cruises scandal, hoping to use it as political ammunition for Gil. Greg later spots Shiv and Nate together, but when he attempts to relay his suspicions to Tom the following morning, Tom attacks him and warns him not to bring it up again. Shiv tells Gerri that she will let the cruises scandal remain secret as long as ATN – Waystar's right-leaning news network – stops slandering Gil over his wife's suicide. Gil and Logan agree to a truce on these terms. Kendall is told by Stewy and Sandy that their takeover of Waystar has been moved up to the day of Shiv's wedding because the story is about to come out and because they will have more leverage while Logan is out of the country.
10	10	"Nobody Is Ever Missing"	Mark Mylod	Jesse Armstrong	August 5, 2018	0.730
Kendall serves Logan with his planned takeover bid. A furious Logan kicks him out, but begins scrambling to get ahead of the situation with his lawyers immediately afterwards. During the wedding, the siblings are infuriated to learn from Logan about Kendall's takeover plans. Shiv admits her infidelity to Tom and suggests that she is better suited for a non-monogamous relationship. Tom forgives her and later ejects Nate from the wedding. Outside the castle, Kendall does drugs with Andrew "Doddy" Dodds, a young waiter whom Logan had fired from the staff, and the two drive off in search of cocaine. They swerve to avoid a deer, and the car lands in the water. Unable to save Doddy, Kendall flees the scene and returns to the wedding in shock. The police investigate the following morning, and Logan tells Kendall that he will make the case go away if Kendall calls off the takeover and attends rehab. Kendall obliges and breaks down crying in his father's arms.

== Production ==
=== Development ===
Showrunner Jesse Armstrong initially conceived the series as a feature film about the Murdoch family, but the script never went into production. Armstrong eventually expanded the scope of the story to include the larger landscape of Wall Street, which he felt better suited a television format. Armstrong wrote a new script centered on original characters loosely inspired by various powerful media families such as the Murdochs, the Redstones, the Maxwells, and the Sulzbergers. On June 6, 2016, it was announced that HBO had given the production a pilot order. The episode was written by Armstrong and directed by Adam McKay. Executive producers for the pilot include Armstrong, McKay, Will Ferrell, Frank Rich, and Kevin Messick. On May 16, 2017, it was announced that HBO had given the production a series order for a first season consisting of ten episodes. The previously announced creative team continued their involvement as the series entered into production. (Note: Attributed to multiple sources:)

=== Casting ===
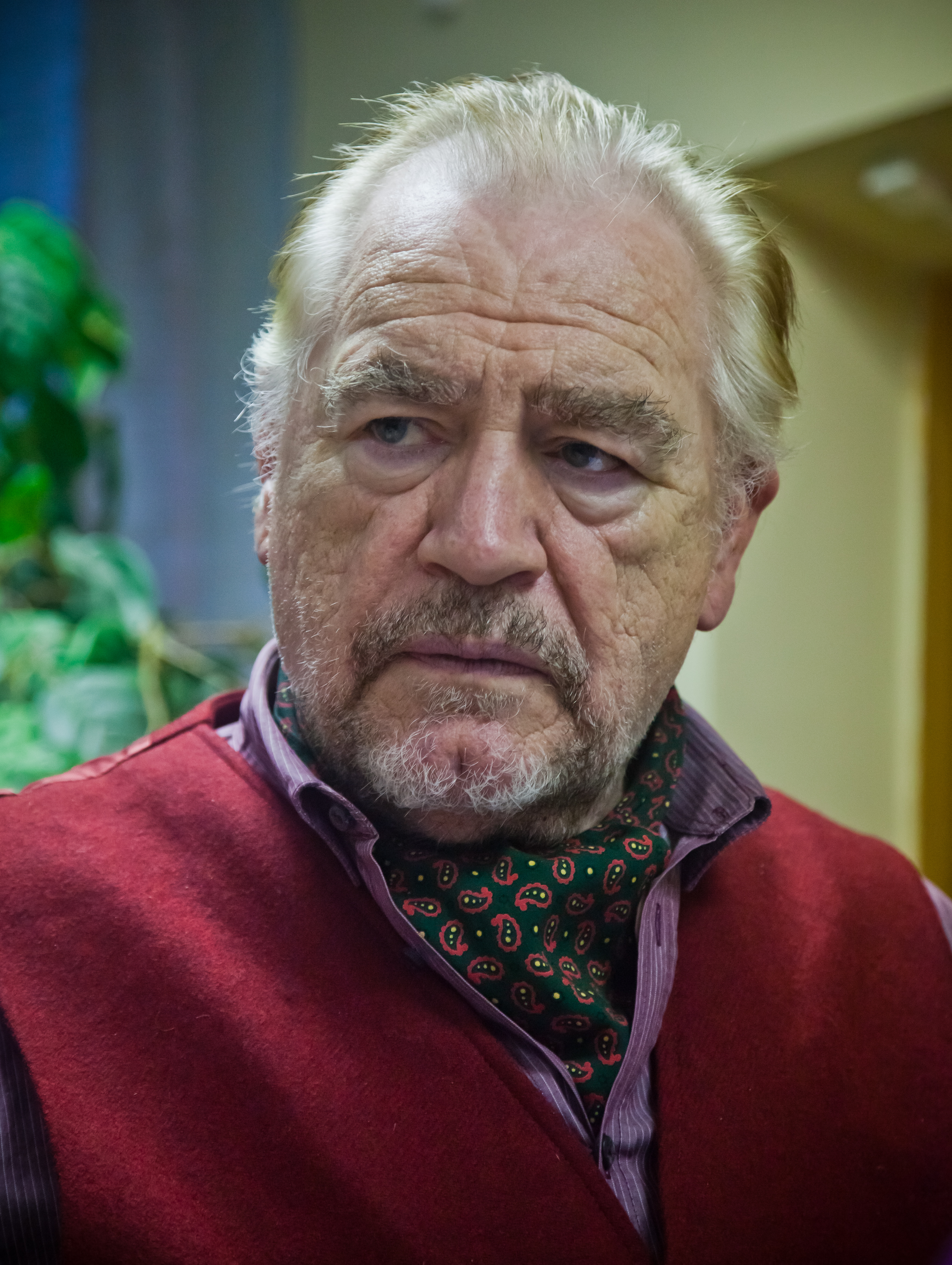
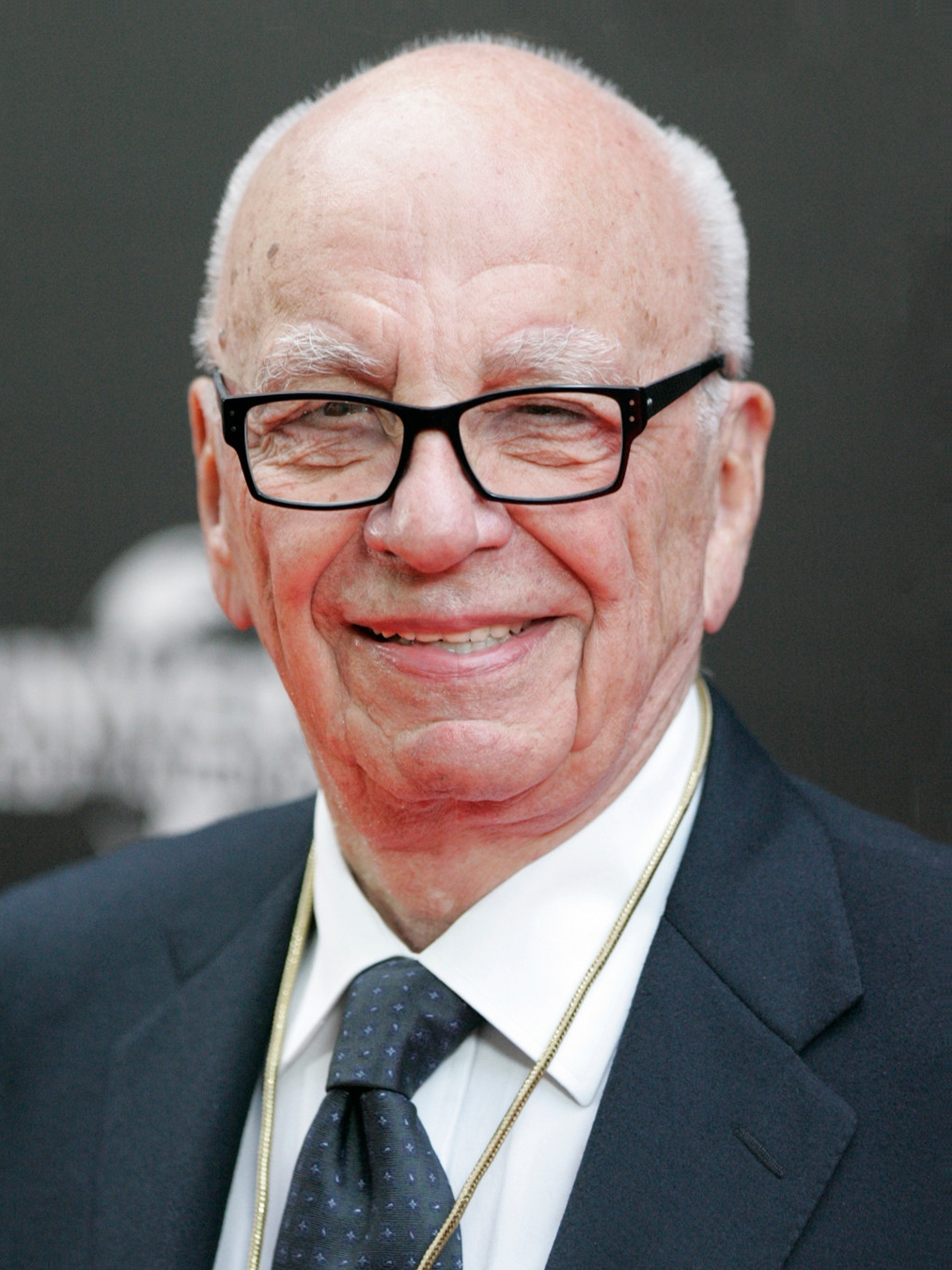
Brian Cox portrays Logan Roy, who was inspired by Rupert Murdoch.

On October 6, 2016, it was announced that Brian Cox, Jeremy Strong, Kieran Culkin, Sarah Snook, Nicholas Braun, and Matthew Macfadyen had been cast in lead roles in the series' pilot. On November 4, 2016, it was announced that Hiam Abbass, Alan Ruck, Rob Yang, Parker Sawyers, and Peter Friedman had also joined the main cast of the pilot. Sawyers only appears in the pilot. On January 24, 2018, it was reported that Ashley Zukerman had joined the series in a recurring role.

In season one, Justine Lupe was cast in a recurring guest role as Willa Ferreyra, the much younger girlfiend of Connor Roy. Lupe said that her character Willa was originally supposed to only appear in 3 episodes before she parts ways with Connor Roy in "Austerlitz". The scheduled breakup in "Austerlitz" was removed following script rewrites for the episode and the character continued to appear in subsequent episodes and seasons. Juliana Canfield originally auditioned for the role of Willa Ferreyra but the role ended up going to Lupe. A week after auditioning for Willa, Canfield was called back by casting directors to audition for a role named Jay who is a political aide to Shiv when she became involved in Democratic Party politics with Gil Eavis. The actress received a call that the role of Jay was cancelled, but she was requested to play a new character named Jess who would be the assistant to Kendall. Canfield was cast as Jess Jordan in 2017 as she was graduating from the Yale School of Drama.

=== Filming ===
The series pilot for Succession was filmed in fall 2016 with Adam McKay directing and Andrij Parekh as cinematographer. In defining the look of Succession, Parekh used Barry Ackroyd's work on McKay's The Big Short as a reference point. Succession was shot on 3-perf 35mm film using the Kodak Vision3 500T 5219 film stock which is optimized for both daylight and tungsten lighting. McKay was "adamant from the start that Succession must be shot on film and pushed that through with the producers" according to cinematographer Andrij Parekh. The reason McKay wanted to shoot on film rather than digital was to give the show a "dirter" and "more textured" look compared to the pristine images from photographing on a digital camera. Parekh used Arri's Arriflex 35BL film cameras with Angenieux 24-290mm lenses that offer up to 12x zoom using an f/2.5–T2.8 aperture and Angenieux Optimo 45-120mm lenses with an f/2.6 aperture for fast zooms. Succession was shot in a 1.43:1 aspect ratio using predominantly handheld cinematography, which was inspired by the Dogme 95 movement and intended to embody the style of mockumentaries where the camera follows the characters rather than being stationary. The observational style of characters gives the audience a fly-on-the-wall perspective. The fly-on-the-wall perspective allows the camera to react to what is happening in front of the lens. Cinematographer Patrick Capone characterized the series' camerawork as "voyeuristic" and "non-cinema[tic]", relying on natural light, close coverage and frequent zooms to evoke the feeling of "eavesdropping" upon the characters and their environments. In order to fully cover dialogue scenes, a multiple-camera setup was used.

Principal photography for the rest of the first season of the series began in October 2017. The season was primarily filmed in New York City locations with additional locations in New Jersey, New Mexico and the United Kingdom. In New York City, the American Irish Historical Society on Fifth Avenue served as the location for Logan Roy's apartment. 714 Broadway was used as the location of Shiv's season 1 apartment, and the Downtown Manhattan Heliport on the East River for scenes of the Roys departing on their helicopters. For scenes depicting the interiors of the Waystar RoyCo offices, the crew used towers 4 and 7 of the World Trade Center, while 28 Liberty Street is used for exterior shots. Silvercup Studios in Queens houses many of the sets used for the series. Other filming locations for the first season included Bellevue Hospital (where the second episode took place), the Cunard Building on 25 Broadway (which houses Cipriani S.A., the venue for a gala in the fourth episode), the East New York Freight Tunnel (the entrance of a bachelor party in the eighth episode), and the Financial District of Lower Manhattan. From mid-to-end of January 2018, the production moved from New York to New Mexico for the episode "Austerlitz", which was primarily filmed in Santa Fe. Filming primarily took place at the 190-acre Rancho Alegre in Santa Fe. On February 22, 2018, filming took place in New Jersey, which required the closing of the Atlantic City-Brigantine tunnel.

Production on the final two episodes of season one moved to the United Kingdom. On February 25, 2018, filming for Shiv and Tom's wedding took place at Eastnor Castle in Herefordshire, England. Eastnor Castle is often used as a real-life wedding locale. The final episode's underwater lake scene following the car crash, in which Kendall escapes from the car wreckage, was filmed in a giant water tank at Pinewood Studios. Prior to filming, actor Jeremy Strong had never taken part in a significant on-screen stunt before. According to Capone, some members of the crew wanted to shoot the underwater sequences digitally with the assumption that the process would be quicker. A second camera was ready but was never used and instead the underwater sequences were entrely shot on film. Filming for the exterior shots of the lake was done at the Victoria Lake near Pinewood Studios.

=== Post-production ===
The post-production processing of the film stock for the series pilot was done by the FotoKem film laboratory in Los Angeles. By the time the full series had gone into production, film was processed and developed at the newly-launched Kodak Film Lab in New York City. Scenes shot for the final two episodes in the UK were processed at the British lab Cinelab. The captured 35mm film stock was scanned at 4K resolution for post-production editing.

== Music ==
=== Composition ===
On November 17, 2017, it was reported that Nicholas Britell would serve as the series' composer. Britell had previously collaborated with McKay on The Big Short (2015) and Vice (2018), though Succession was the first television series that he had composed a score for. Britell visited the set where the pilot was filming in 2016. Watching the filming of a fight scene between the family patriarch Logan Roy and his son Kendall enabled Britell to experience "subconsciously kind of taking things in about the frequency of the show". McKay and Armstrong were invited to Britell's studio where they were played a chord progression that Britell said "felt very, very 1700s" and it was this chord progression that would eventually become the Succession main theme. In composing the score for the first season, Britell wanted the show's dark classical music to reflect a "mixture of absurdity and seriousness" where the show addresses the subject of increased concentrations of wealth and power among fewer people while also acknowledging the delusions of grandeur held by members of the Roy family.

At the 2019 Primetime Emmy Awards, Britell won the award for Outstanding Original Main Title Theme Music for his Succession main theme.

=== Soundtrack ===
Succession: Season 1 (HBO Original Series Soundtrack)

Soundtrack album by Nicholas Britell
- Released: August 9, 2019
- Genres: Classical; hip hop
- Length: 37:43
- Label: Milan Records

Singles from Succession: Season 1 (HBO Original Series Soundtrack)
- 1. "Succession (Main Title Theme)" Released: July 20, 2018

Succession: Season 1 (HBO Original Series Soundtrack) is the soundtrack to the first season of Succession, released on August 9, 2019 by Milan Records. The album was preceded by the single – the main title theme, released earlier on July 20, 2018.

No.	Title	Length
1.	"Succession – Main Title Theme"	1:42
2.	"Adagio in C Minor"	1:30
3.	"Minuet in B Minor"	1:37
4.	"Andante in C Minor"	1:57
5.	"Strings Con Fuoco"	1:12
6.	"Clarinets and Strings"	1:07
7.	"Serenade in E-Flat Major"	0:50
8.	"Bell Atmospheres"	1:42
9.	"Waystar Royco Corporate Identity – "Feel It!""	0:44
10.	"Strings + 808 + Beat"	1:11
11.	"Theme Variation – Piano, Orchestra, 808"	0:52
12.	"Allegro in C Minor"	0:57
13.	"Dark Minuet"	1:05
14.	"Andante Con Moto – Strings in E-flat Minor"	2:14
15.	"Andante in C Minor – Solo Piano"	1:45
16.	"Succession – End Title Theme" (Strings and Winds Variation)	1:26
17.	"Andantino for Brass and Orchestra in B Minor"	1:51
18.	"A Piacere" (Orchestra)	1:52
19.	"Bell and Pizzicato Fantasia"	1:23
20.	"Power" (Instrumental)	1:35
21.	"Succession – End Title Theme" (Brass Quintet Variation)	1:24
22.	"Mysterium – Strings"	1:56
23.	"Austerlitz – Allegro Moderato"	1:15
24.	"Austerlitz – Allegretto"	1:37
25.	"Million Dollar Home Run"	1:30
26.	"Succession – End Title Theme" (Piano and Cello Variation)	1:29
Total length:		37:43

== Release ==
On April 27, 2018, the season held its official world premiere during the Series Mania Festival in Lille, France, in which the pilot episode was screened. On May 22, 2018, the season held its official US premiere at the Time Warner Center in New York City. The season premiered on HBO on June 3, 2018.

=== Home media ===
HBO released the first season on DVD on August 6, 2018, which included special features; a Blu-ray release was made available on November 6 of the same year.

== Reception ==
=== Audience viewership ===
The series premiere drew 582,000 live viewers, down from the 1.39 million viewers that watched its lead-in, Westworld.

=== Critical response ===
The first season was met with positive reviews from critics. On the review aggregator website Rotten Tomatoes, the season holds an approval rating of 89% with an average rating of 7.9/10, based on 89 reviews. The website's critical consensus reads, "Peppering its pathos with acid wit, Succession is a divine comedy of absolute power and dysfunction – brought to vivid life by a ferocious ensemble." Metacritic, which uses a weighted average, assigned the season a score of 70 out of 100 based on 29 critics, indicating "generally favorable" reviews.

=== Accolades ===
The first season received five nominations at the 71st Primetime Emmy Awards, including Outstanding Drama Series, and Jesse Armstrong won for Outstanding Writing for a Drama Series (for the episode "Nobody Is Ever Missing").
