= JMM =

JMM can refer to:

== People ==
- John Michael Montgomery, American country music singer
- Juan Manuel Márquez, Mexican boxer
- John Mark McMillan, American songwriter and musician

== Science and technology ==
- Java Memory Model, the model which defines execution-time constraints on the relationship between threads and data in order to achieve consistent and reliable Java applications.

== Organizations and business ==
- Jacques Marie Mage, luxury sunglasses brand
- Jharkhand Mukti Morcha, a political party in India
- Jabheh-yi Mubarizin-i Mardumi (Balochi for People's Fighters Front), a Baloch nationalist militant organization in Iran
- Juventud en Marcha con Macías, the youth wing and death squad of the United National Workers' Party

== Others ==
- Jamiatu Muslim Mindanao, one of the oldest and biggest Madaris in the Philippines
- Jesuit Music Ministry, a record label in the Philippines.
- Jewish Military Museum, London, England
- James Morgan McGill (aka Saul Goodman) a character in AMC's Breaking Bad and the main character of its spin-off Better Call Saul.
- "JMM" (Better Call Saul), an episode of Better Call Saul
- Joint Mathematics Meetings, an annual mathematics conference hosted by the MAA and AMS
- Journal of Medical Microbiology, a scientific journal
