= Succession (Main Title Theme) =

2018 song by Nicholas Britell

Single by Nicholas Britell
- Released: July 20, 2018
- Recorded: 2018
- Genre: Classical; hip hop
- Length: 1:42
- Label: Milan
- Composer: Nicholas Britell
- Producer: Nicholas Britell

"Succession (Main Title Theme)" is the theme music of HBO's satirical dark comedy-drama television series Succession which plays during the title sequence. It was composed by Nicholas Britell in 2018 and was released by Milan Records and HBO on July 20, 2018.

The theme was composed using piano tunes, layered with strings, brass, beats from the Roland TR-808 drum machine and percussive sounds to blend classical and hip hop music.

The title theme was critically acclaimed and became hailed as "one of the best television show themes" while also being referenced in popular cultures, with being included in memes, remixes, fan projects, and TikTok viral trends. A remixed version of the theme song by rapper Pusha T was released in October 2019. At the 71st Primetime Creative Arts Emmy Awards the title theme won the award for Outstanding Original Main Title Theme Music.

== Background ==
For Britell, hip hop was a major influence in the show, especially in the opening sequence where Kendall Roy (Jeremy Strong) listens to Beastie Boys' "An Open Letter to NYC" (2004) as he arrives at the headquarters of his family business. He said, "I wanted to incorporate some oversized hip-hop beats... While I grew up as a classical pianist, when I was in college I was in a hip-hop band – I used to make like four beats a day. But I've never had the opportunity or canvas to explore these things on the scale that Succession enabled [...] When you put things together and realize it's working, it's almost like a physical or emotional response." Although he composed the theme, it still needed approval from the showrunner Jesse Armstrong and executive producer Adam McKay, who agreed to use it in the sequence. The title theme serves as the foundation of the score, and is fragmented into smaller sections that can be heard throughout the show. Multiple variations of the track have been recorded, featuring the same chords played in different ways with different instruments.

According to former film and television composer, and founder of Ample Music, Drew Silverstein, "the score subverts expectations and leaves it up to viewers to determine a scene's mood or subtext. Unlike sitcoms with clear audio cues or Marvel movies with big, bombastic musical moments, the Succession score refrains from providing a meta-commentary. That also adds to the documentary-style realism of the show. It's meant to draw you into the reality that exists. It's relatable enough that we're like, 'Oh wow, that's our world, not a Disney movie in some imaginary world.'"

== Composition ==
The main title theme was composed from the classical piano tune underneath a massive hip-hop beat. It paraphrases a piece of Beethoven's Pathétique Sonata. Britell further used strings, brass and low-end beats from the Roland TR-808 drum machine, while oddly dissonant percussive sounds were laid and woven through the theme and other cues of the score. The song starts with a downbeat that "creates a decisive beginning that dominoes into a pattern of optimizing the downbeats as the bars recur through the score". It then progresses into C minor and to B major, creating a dissonant sound.

Music theorist and psychologist Stefanie Acevedo said that the piano is played in high and low registers and sometimes out of sync, the melody is in a minor key punctuated by dissonant chords, and the distorted base line rocks "the foundation of the theme". There are two string layers: a "low ostinato" pattern that gives the theme forward momentum, coupled with high strings that echo the piano motif with a "very raw, shrill, almost out-of-control tone. Nick has done a really good job of not only making a powerful score and theme, but also staking out a unique sound."

== Reception ==
=== Critical response ===
The Succession title theme was lauded by mainstream critics, referred to as one of "the best title themes for television". Calling it as an "unmistakable earworm" and "trippy tune", Firstpost-based critic Lakshmi Govindrajan Javeri said that the tune is "both rich in its dark classical sound from the 1700s, yet groovy like Coolio was composing it on a Steinway". Rolling Stone listed it in number 25, in one of their "Top 100 television theme songs of all time" and said "the music for Succession nicely drives home the notion of a ruling class that has descended into gangster decadence, of ambition and entitlement collapsing into chaos and nihilism".

=== Themes ===
The combination of dark classical music and hip hop underlines a "kind of duality that is representative of the show’s themes", as Javeri had recalled, that "on the one hand, there are outrageous heights of luxury and obscene exploitation of power, the other hand holds within the quirks of humane vulnerability that hides behind the absurdity of one’s misplaced sense of self. It is cyclical in its very nature because every oppressor operates from a space of fearing victimhood, and every victim in the show has a false, egoistic perception of how they have perhaps scored a home run in manipulation. There is neither clarity of morals nor vision, and the title theme heightens this obfuscation with striking distortion effects."

== Personnel ==
- Nicholas Britell – score production
- John Finklea – score production
- Patricia Sullivan – mastering
- Tommy Vicari – mixing
- Stefan Karrer – executive production
- Jean-Christophe Chamboredon – executive production
- Pablo Manyer – production management

== Charts ==
=== Decade-end charts ===
20s Decade-end chart performance
Chart (2025–2026)	Position
Russia Streaming (TopHit)	153

== Remixed version ==
"Puppets (Succession Remix)"

Single by Nicholas Britell and Pusha T
- Released: October 4, 2019
- Recorded: 2019
- Genre: Classical; hip hop; remix; rap
- Length: 2:17
- Label: HBO; Def Jam
- Songwriter: Pusha T
- Producer: Nicholas Britell

Pusha T singles chronology
"Coming Home" (2019)	"Puppets (Succession Remix)" (2019)	"Good Morning" (2020)

The title theme was remixed several times by fans of the show, as the song reached popularity. However, Britell wanted the song to be officially remixed, hence he chose Pusha T to produce the remix version, as he felt that "his voice is like a missile". Pusha met Britell at a recording in Los Angeles, who was pitched the track and said about the series' theme: "We talked about the connection to power and its dynamic, issues writ large: struggle, pain, all of the things we could deal with". He had to redo the lyrics, as it might reveal the plot details for the second season as "the lines were too detailed". For the remix, he used more bass and hip hop to create "more bigger and bolder sound", while also adding choral arrangements to the sound.

"The greed, the resentment, the idea anybody is basically disposable — that’s a gangsta movie type of quality. On Succession, it’s involving family, it’s like, Whoa! It’s a bit more shocking. And so that’s what made the writing process fun, because I could use all of the street, gangster rap nuances and qualities and energy and incorporate it into the theme of the music. It was really just a dope exercise, honestly."

— Pusha T, on the themes of Succession

The track was released as "Puppets (Succession Remix)" as a single on October 4, 2019, by HBO and Def Jam Recordings.
