= Celebration (Succession) =

- Succession episode
- Episode no.: Season 1 Episode 1
- Directed by: Adam McKay
- Written by: Jesse Armstrong
- Original air date: June 3, 2018
- Running time: 67 minutes

Guest appearances
- Mary Birdsong as Marianne Hirsch; Molly Griggs as Grace; Swayam Bhatia as Sophie Roy; Quentin Morales as Iverson Roy; Scott Nicholson as Colin

Episode chronology
← Previous —	Next → "Shit Show at the Fuck Factory"
- Succession season 1

"Celebration" is the pilot episode and the first episode of the first season of the satirical comedy-drama television series Succession. It originally aired on HBO on June 3, 2018. The episode was written by series creator Jesse Armstrong and directed by Adam McKay.

The episode introduces the Roy family, owners of the fictional media conglomerate Waystar RoyCo, and follows their relationships and conflicts during the 80th birthday of the family patriarch, Logan Roy.

== Plot ==
Logan Roy (Brian Cox), the patriarchal head of the global media conglomerate Waystar RoyCo, is about to celebrate his eightieth birthday. Logan's health appears to be in decline; he wakes up in the middle of the night thoroughly disoriented and urinates on his carpet. He is tended to by Marcia (Hiam Abbass), his third wife.

Logan's second-oldest son Kendall (Jeremy Strong) attempts to acquire the media startup Vaulter from its CEO Lawrence Yee (Rob Yang), but Yee despises the Roys and tells Kendall that he has no interest in selling. Determined nonetheless, Kendall believes he is set to be announced as the company's heir at Logan's birthday.

Logan's distant great-nephew Greg Hirsch (Nicholas Braun) is fired from his job at one of Waystar's theme parks after smoking marijuana and vomiting through his mascot costume. Greg's mother Marianne tells him to fly to New York for Logan's birthday so that he can ask for a better job at the company. While attempting to salvage the Vaulter acquisition, Kendall is surprised to see his father arrive at the office; Logan has Kendall sign some documents ostensibly pertaining to his son's takeover as CEO. Later that day, the Roys gather at Logan's apartment for his birthday lunch. Logan receives gifts from his eldest son Connor (Alan Ruck), an eccentric who is uninvolved with the family business; his third son, the spoiled, immature Roman (Kieran Culkin); his daughter Siobhan "Shiv" (Sarah Snook), a political consultant; and Shiv's sycophantic boyfriend, Tom Wambsgans (Matthew Macfadyen). Greg introduces himself to Logan, who agrees to give him a job if Greg's grandfather and Logan's brother Ewan (James Cromwell) personally reaches out to Logan to ask. Kendall arrives and attempts to reconcile with his estranged wife Rava (Natalie Gold) and their two children, who left him because of his drug abuse.

Logan takes his children aside and shocks them by asking them to sign documents that will give Marcia two seats on the company's board. Kendall protests, but Logan tells him that they are the same documents that Kendall has already signed and that he will not be resigning. After lunch, Logan decides to fly the family out for their traditional birthday softball game. At the game, Kendall offers Roman and Shiv a counter-proposal naming him Logan's successor and appointing the two of them as co-COOs, but they rebuff him. Roman agrees to sign off on his father's original plan if he is named COO, replacing Logan's deputy Frank Vernon (Peter Friedman). Logan agrees and fires Frank at the game. A resentful Kendall leaves the game and calls one of his media contacts to spread public rumors about Logan's failing health. Down a player, Roman replaces him with the grounds keeper's son. He offers the boy a million dollars if he hits a home run and even writes a check, only to tear it up in the boy's face once he gets tagged out by Tom. Logan's attendant has the grounds keeper's family sign a non-disclosure agreement and gives them the Patek Philippe watch that Tom gave to Logan moments earlier.

While flying back to Manhattan, the other Roy siblings get into an argument with Logan regarding Marcia's involvement with the trust. Logan suddenly suffers a hemorrhagic stroke, collapses, and is rushed to the hospital. Kendall learns about his father's condition only after conceding to Yee a significant package of cash, shares, and a board position to close his deal. Yee threatens to use his new power to ruin Kendall and his family now that Logan is out of the picture.

== Production ==
=== Development ===
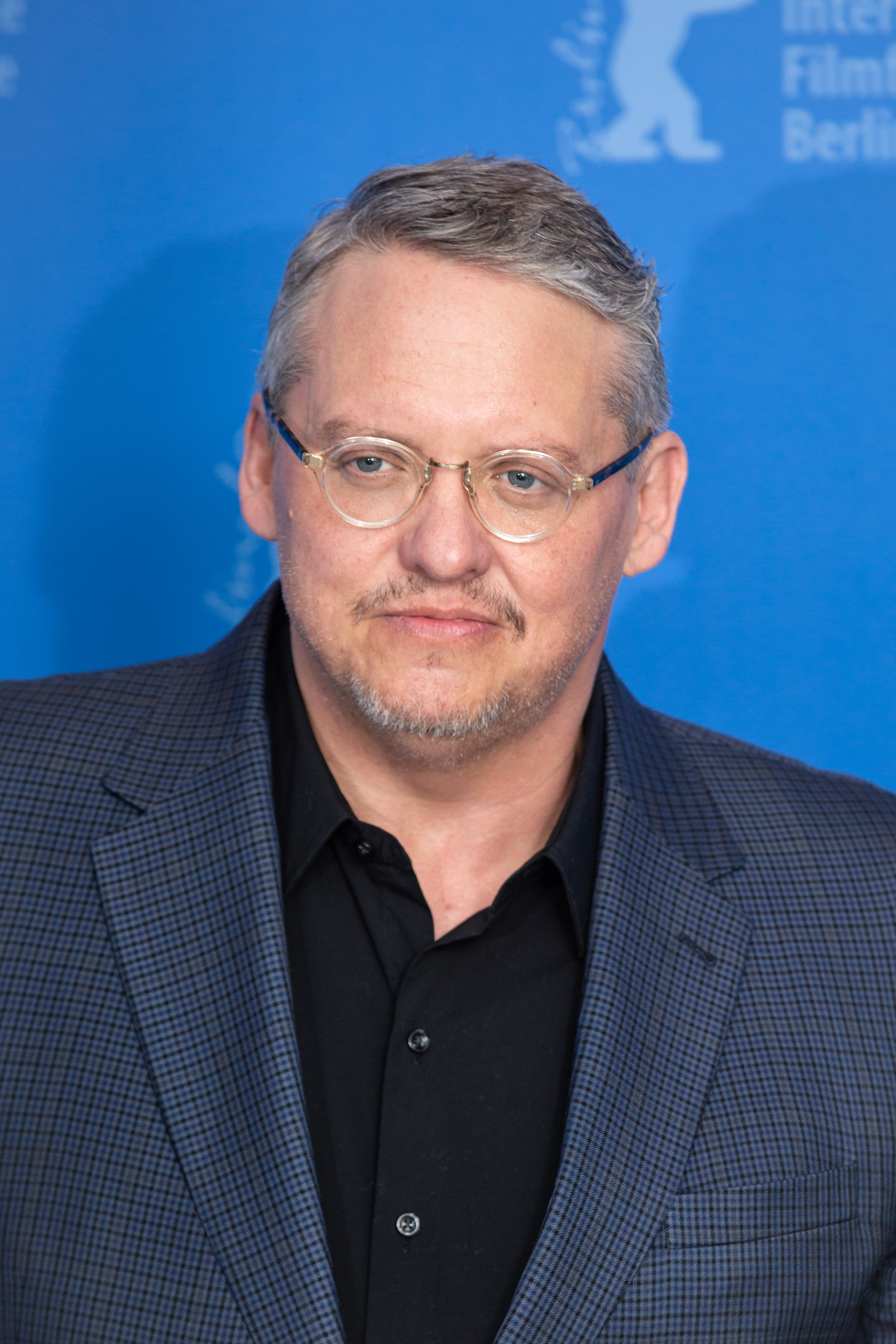
Adam McKay directed the pilot episode.

"Celebration" was written by Succession showrunner Jesse Armstrong and directed by filmmaker Adam McKay. Armstrong initially conceived the series as a feature film about the Murdoch family, but the script never went into production. Armstrong eventually expanded the scope of the story to include the larger landscape of Wall Street, which he felt better suited for a television format. Armstrong wrote a new script centered on original characters loosely inspired by various powerful media families such as the Murdochs, the Redstones and the Sulzbergers. On June 6, 2016, it was announced that HBO had given the production a pilot order. Executive producers for the pilot include Armstrong, McKay, Will Ferrell, Frank Rich, and Kevin Messick.

=== Filming ===
The pilot was filmed in late 2016. The episode, alongside the rest of the series, was shot on 35 mm film using Arriflex 35 cameras. The production used the American Irish Historical Society on Fifth Avenue as the location for Logan's apartment, while scenes of the Roys departing on their helicopters were filmed at the Downtown Manhattan Heliport on the East River. For scenes depicting the interiors of the Waystar RoyCo offices, the crew used towers 4 and 7 of the World Trade Center, while 28 Liberty Street was used for exterior shots. Production designer George DeTitta Jr. stated that he took direct inspiration from the Murdochs' offices in finding locations for the Waystar premises. Adventureland in East Farmingdale, New York stood in for the Waystar theme park where Greg is first seen working.

During a round-table discussion for The Hollywood Reporter, McKay remarked that he encouraged improvisation on set while filming the episode, which many of the actors were initially uncomfortable with but later embraced. McKay noted that every conversation during the birthday lunch was improvised. McKay, who had previously worked with actor Jeremy Strong on The Big Short, gave Strong one take to film Kendall's breakdown in the bathroom, where Kendall smashes various objects before promptly cleaning up the mess himself. McKay stated that it was his favorite sequence in the episode because of how effectively it encapsulated Kendall's character.

== Reception ==
=== Ratings ===
According to Nielsen ratings, the episode was watched by 0.582 million viewers, receiving an 18-49 rating of 0.15.

=== Critical reception ===
"Celebration" received generally positive reviews from critics, who praised the script, performances and dark humor. Randall Colburn of The A.V. Club gave the episode a B, praising the way McKay's direction revealed each character's nature over the course of the episode. Colburn also praised how the series' "grey, austere aesthetic" and the "palpable tragedies" affecting its characters offset its "abundant" comedy. Sean T. Collins of Decider reserved praise for the softball game sequence, which depicts Roman offering a young working-class boy a check for $1 million for hitting a home run, only to tear up the check in front the boy after he loses the game. Collins singled out the scene where Logan congratulates the boy afterwards, remarking "it crushed me that this billionaire maniac could sit and watch his offspring ritualistically humiliate a child and think to himself 'I know how to make this right: I will congratulate this young man on a job well done, and he will be grateful for my noblesse oblige.'" Jen Chaney of Vulture found the pilot less compelling than the rest of the season, but praised the ensemble cast, particularly Kieran Culkin for imbuing the character of Roman with "an arrogant know-it-all-ism that would be a total turn-off in real life but is absolutely delicious to watch on television." Chaney also praised the writing, likening the series to "a profane mix of Billions and Veep" and comparing the characters to both the Murdochs and the Bluths from Arrested Development.
