= Nobody Is Ever Missing =

- Succession episode
- Episode no.: Season 1 Episode 10
- Directed by: Mark Mylod
- Written by: Jesse Armstrong
- Original air date: August 5, 2018
- Running time: 66 minutes

Guest appearances
- J. Smith-Cameron as Gerri Kellman; Arian Moayed as Stewy Hosseini; Harriet Walter as Lady Caroline Collingwood; Eric Bogosian as Gil Eavis; Justine Lupe as Willa; Ashley Zukerman as Nate Sofrelli; Caitlin FitzGerald as Tabitha; David Rasche as Karl; Dagmara Domińczyk as Karolina; Tom Morley as Doddy; Scott Nicholson as Colin; Juliana Canfield as Jess Jordan; Swayam Bhatia as Sophie Roy; Quentin Morales as Iverson Roy

Episode chronology
← Previous "Pre-Nuptial"	Next → "The Summer Palace"
- Succession season 1

"Nobody Is Ever Missing" is the tenth and final episode of the first season of the American satirical comedy-drama television series Succession. It was written by series showrunner Jesse Armstrong and directed by Mark Mylod, and originally aired on HBO on August 5, 2018.

The episode takes place at Shiv and Tom's wedding, which serves as a backdrop for various ongoing conflicts within the Roy family, chiefly Kendall's attempted takeover of Waystar RoyCo.

== Plot ==
On the day of Shiv and Tom's wedding, the family gathers for photos while Kendall and Stewy sequester themselves away to finalize the announcement of their takeover bid for Waystar RoyCo. Kendall delivers the official documents to Logan, confirming that it is indeed a bear hug. Logan is furious and kicks Kendall out of his room, but begins scrambling to get ahead of the situation with his legal team immediately afterwards.

Prior to the reception, Roman excuses himself to the restroom to watch the live broadcast of a Japanese satellite launch, which Logan had placed under his responsibility. (Note: As depicted in "Austerlitz".) However, the rocket explodes on the launchpad. Roman later feigns surprise when Gerri confronts him about it. Meanwhile, Connor informs Willa that he intends to run for President of the United States. A stressed Logan joins the crowd amidst his legal crisis, and angrily fires a young waiter for spilling champagne on his arm. The waiter is immediately met with an NDA and cash settlement.

The wedding reception begins that night and the Roys give their speeches for Shiv and Tom. Logan gathers his children to another room to inform them of Kendall's takeover bid, infuriating all of them. Kendall arrives soon after and confirms his plans, trying to fend off the anger of his siblings. Afterwards, he repeatedly asks Stewy for cocaine, but Stewy declines in order to preserve Kendall's focus for the night.

Roman is relieved to learn from Gerri that no one died in the rocket explosion. Connor announces his presidential ambitions to his siblings. Kendall runs into Greg outside the castle, who reveals that he kept copies of the documents pertaining to crimes on Waystar's cruises and uses them as leverage to request a better position within the company. Kendall is impressed and agrees to Greg's wishes. Shiv and Tom return to their bedroom, where Shiv confides to Tom that she feels she is better suited for a non-monogamous relationship, and admits her affair with Nate. Tom forgives her but ejects Nate from the wedding.

Kendall wanders outside the castle searching for drugs and runs into Andrew "Doddy" Dodds, the waiter whom Logan had fired earlier. The waiter does ketamine and offers some to Kendall, but Kendall insists he needs some coke instead. Since Dodds feels unfit to drive, Kendall offers to drive to his contact to procure the coke. As they approach a bridge, a deer appears on the road. A startled Dodd reaches out and grabs the steering wheel, landing the car in the water below. Unable to save Dodds from drowning, Kendall flees the scene and returns to the wedding in shock. Having lost his key card in the crash, he breaks into his own bedroom, showers, and rejoins the crowd on the dance floor to keep up appearances with his family.

The police investigate the case the following morning and recover Kendall's key card at the crash site. Logan concocts a cover story suggesting that Dodds stole Kendall's key card, but privately tells Kendall he knows he is responsible. Logan promises to make the case go away if Kendall calls off the takeover and attends rehab. Kendall obliges and breaks down crying in his father's arms.

== Production ==
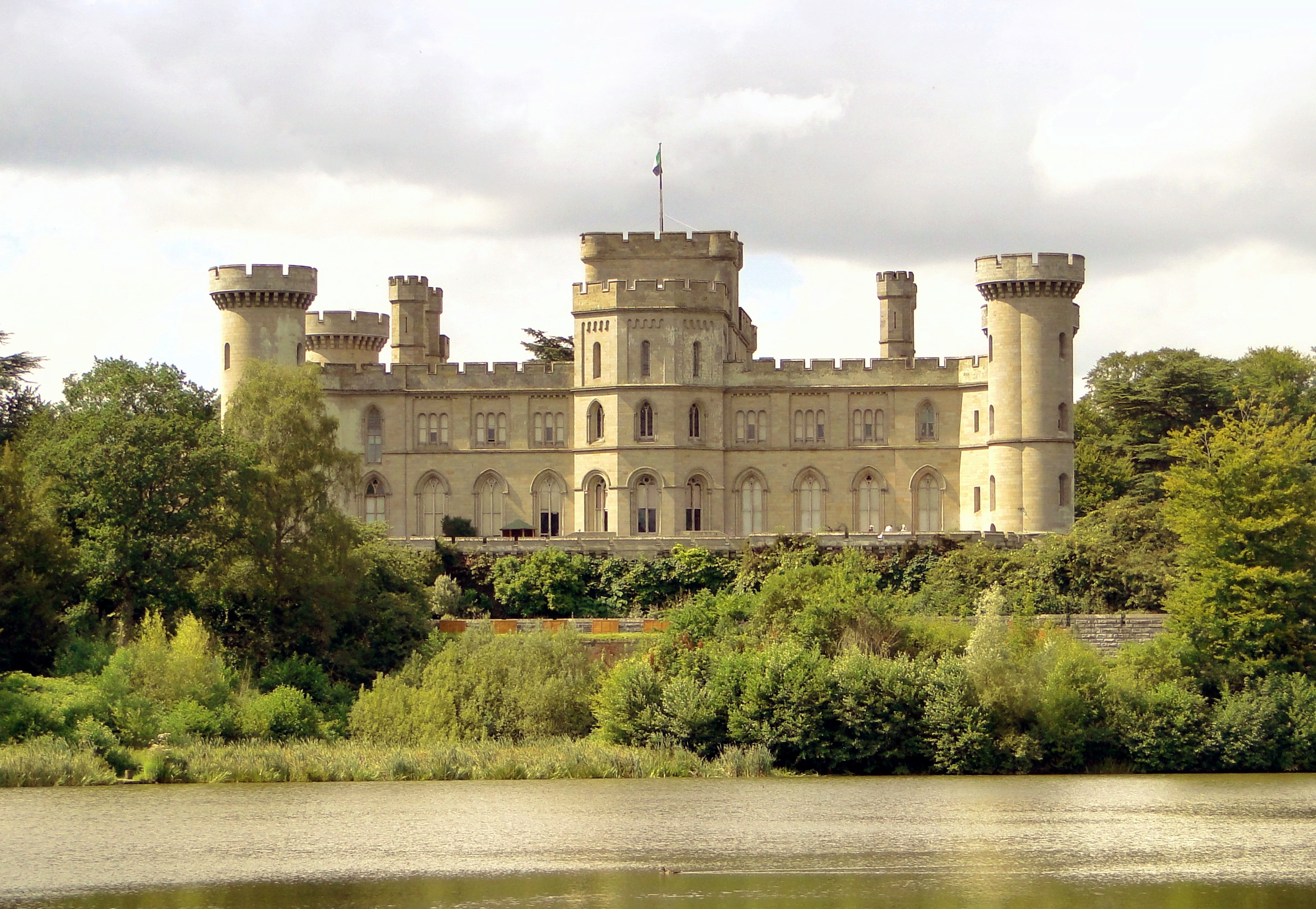
The final two episodes of the season were filmed at Eastnor Castle.

"Nobody Is Ever Missing" was written by Succession showrunner Jesse Armstrong and directed by Mark Mylod in his fourth episode for the series. The episode's title derives from a line in John Berryman's "Dream Song 29". The episode, along with the penultimate episode of the season, "Pre-Nuptial", was filmed at Eastnor Castle in Herefordshire, England. The castle has frequently featured on other television series and is often used as a real-life wedding locale.

The writers used Senator Ted Kennedy's car accident in 1969 at Chappaquiddick as inspiration for Kendall's accident. Actor Jeremy Strong recounted that his scenes of Kendall leaving the car crash were filmed towards "4 in the morning" under freezing rain, and that he requested director Mylod to shoot most of the 10-minute scene in a single session to preserve the dramatic tension. The final exchange between Logan and Kendall is reminiscent of Kennedy's own confession of the Chappaquiddick incident to his father, as recounted in Joe McGinniss' biography The Last Brother. Strong cited The Man Who Owns The News, Michael Wolff's biography on Rupert Murdoch, in describing Logan as possessing the "language of strength" in a way Kendall does not, which he felt summarized the dynamic between the two characters by the end of the season.

== Reception ==
=== Ratings ===
The episode was watched by 0.730 million viewers, earning a 0.20 in the 18–49 rating demographics on the Nielsen Media Research ratings scale. This means that 0.20 percent of all households with television watched the episode. This was an increase of over one million viewers from the previous episode, which was watched by 0.558 million viewers with an 0.13 in the 18–49 demographics.

=== Critical reception ===
"Nobody Is Ever Missing" received critical acclaim. Randall Colburn of The A.V. Club gave the episode an A−, praising the series and Armstrong for avoiding trying to make the characters likeable and committing to its moral ambiguity while still adding depth to its characterization. Colburn reserved praise for Strong's performance, calling it "subtle, layered, and deeply vulnerable" and remarking on the character's improvement over the course of the season. Karen Han wrote in a review for Vox, "It's that refusal to fall into a strictly black-and-white matrix that ultimately makes the Succession finale so affecting, and so difficult to watch. The balance between comedy and tragedy finally tips, crashing into the latter category, and it's a testament to the series that it all comes together." Writing for Forbes, Carolyn Lipka stated, "When people call Succession a satire it does the show a disservice—this is a tried and true Shakespearean drama about the ways in which absolute power rots you from the inside."

=== Accolades ===
For the episode, creator Jesse Armstrong received a Primetime Emmy Award for Outstanding Writing for a Drama Series in 2019.
