= Kendall Roy =

Fictional character from Succession

- Succession character
- Jeremy Strong as Kendall Roy
- First appearance: "Celebration" (2018)
- Last appearance: "With Open Eyes" (2023)
- Created by: Jesse Armstrong
- Portrayed by: Jeremy Strong

In-universe information
- Full name: Kendall Logan Roy
- Titles: Interim CEO of Waystar RoyCo (season 1); Co-COO of Waystar RoyCo (season 2); Interim co-CEO of Waystar RoyCo (season 4)
- Occupation: Businessman
- Affiliation: Waystar RoyCo
- Family: Logan Roy (father); Caroline Collingwood (mother); Connor Roy (half-brother); Roman Roy (brother); Siobhan Roy (sister)
- Spouse: Rava Roy (estranged)
- Significant other: Naomi Pierce (ex-girlfriend)
- Children: Sophie Roy (daughter); Iverson Roy (son)
- Relatives: Ewan Roy (paternal uncle); Marianne Hirsch (paternal cousin); Greg Hirsch (paternal first cousin, once removed); Tom Wambsgans (brother-in-law); Willa Ferreyra (sister-in-law)
- Home: 180 East 88th Street, Manhattan, New York City, United States.
- Nationality: British-American

Kendall Logan Roy is a fictional character and the main protagonist of the American HBO satirical dark comedy-drama television series Succession. He is portrayed by American actor Jeremy Strong. Kendall, as with the rest of the show's characters, was created by showrunner Jesse Armstrong. Armstrong initially conceived the series as a feature film about the Murdoch family, but the script never went into production. He later decided to create a new script centered on original characters loosely inspired by various powerful media families.

He is a member of the Roy family, owners of Waystar RoyCo, a global media and entertainment conglomerate, led by patriarch Logan Roy. Kendall is Logan's second son, eldest child from his second marriage, and serves as Logan's archenemy throughout the series. As heir apparent upon Logan's retirement, Kendall is struggling to prove his worth to his father amid bungling major deals and battling with substance abuse, as well as trying to maintain a relationship with his estranged wife Rava and his children. Logan announces during his 80th birthday that he will remain CEO indefinitely, but shortly after suffers a stroke and is admitted to the hospital, leading Kendall to become acting CEO with brother Roman as COO. The various back-and-forths with his father and siblings for control of the company become a central part of Kendall's storyline.

The character and Strong's performance have received universal critical acclaim, with Kendall widely being considered the show's breakout character. Strong's approach to acting and Kendall's portrayal has led to scrutiny by the media due to its intensity. Strong has said of the character: "To me, the stakes are life and death, I take him as seriously as I take my own life." For his portrayal, Strong has won a Primetime Emmy Award for Outstanding Lead Actor in a Drama Series, and a Golden Globe Award for Best Actor – Television Series Drama, as well as a Critics' Choice Television Award for Best Actor in a Drama Series and a Satellite Award for Best Supporting Actor – Series, Miniseries or Television Film.

== Development ==
=== Casting and creation ===
"That's exactly why we cast Jeremy in that role, because he's not playing it like a comedy. He's playing it like he's Hamlet."

— Adam McKay, Succession Executive producer.

Strong's previous role in the Adam McKay film The Big Short led McKay to offer him a part in the show, of which he was a producer. McKay originally described the show to him as a "King Lear for the media-industrial complex" and gave him the script, so he could pick a role he "connected" with. Strong was initially interested in playing Roman Roy, the family's youngest son, as it was a type of character he had not played before. In August 2016, Strong received a call that the part had been given to Kieran Culkin. Despite this, showrunner Jesse Armstrong agreed to audition him for the role of Kendall Roy, the middle son and heir apparent. Strong was quite disappointed after not getting the role of Roman, stating that "the disappointment and the feeling of being thwarted—it only sharpened my need and hunger. I went in with a vengeance." He prepared by reading books such as Michael Wolff’s biography of Rupert Murdoch and chose details from it, like the way James Murdoch would tie his shoe laces. Armstrong, said of the audition: "He just felt completely Kendall from the very first read, he just had it all internalized—Kendall's ambition and competency, but also that Achilles heel of always feeling his father's watchfulness." He also felt that Kendall was the hardest character to cast: "If we don't get this right, it'll be a big problem. So when I saw somebody in Jeremy who could do that incredibly engaged, real thing, that made me very happy." Strong felt that during his audition he had a "narrative", saying: "I'm determined, I'm a fighter, I'm full of doubt, and those things are all true of Kendall. I think they're maybe true of me." McKay said Strong had "one of the most difficult roles" in the show.

For Strong, Kendall was a particularly draining role. "I don't think I'm a very dark person, I think I tend towards positivity in my own life. At times it has felt like holding myself under water, or under a sheet of ice." Due to the emotional toll some of the storylines took on his character, Strong has said of filming the first season: "That was a harrowing time for me," adding, "People ask me if I'm having fun, It's not fun to live in that place." He was reticent of the idea that the show was a comedy, and discussed the issue with co-star Kieran Culkin. When confronted by an interviewer, who told him he thought the show was indeed a dark comedy, Strong asked: "In the sense that, like, Chekhov is comedy?" In order to maintain the tension between the family members on the show, Strong reduced his interactions with his cast members to a minimum, "While we were cordial and friendly, and I have a great deal of love and respect for all the actors on the show, I tended to keep a distance and felt quite remote. We were atomized as a family." Of Strong's approach director Mark Mylod said: "Had it been anyone other than Jeremy, anyone with less talent, it would have driven me crazy."

Armstrong has said that Kendall and his siblings were inspired by real-life magnates' offspring such as Ian and Kevin Maxwell, Shari and Brent Redstone, and Murdoch's children. He also wanted them to have lived in England for a while, as a way to show that they were, "quite international due to being incredibly wealthy." Aside from Murdoch's biography, Strong also read other books in that realm, such as Sumner Redstone's "A Passion to Win," and Donald Trump's The Art of the Deal, he also researched on the question of legacy by looking at the Redstones, Conrad Black, the Koch brothers, the Newhouse family, and the Sulzberger family, as an attempt to understand the world Kendall inhabited. Before the first season started filming, Strong recalled visiting the writers room in Brixton and picking up on a wall covered in note cards, plotting out the story. "All I remember is that there was one card which became prescient: Kendall wins but loses." Some objects were added by the actor such as cards that were in Kendall's office, handwritten by Strong, based on conversations with the show's business consultant.

=== Characterisation ===
At the beginning of the first season, Strong said that the character is trying on a "tech media bro persona" as a way to project a confident and "fearsome" image. He noted that Kendall is "riddled with doubt" and that his addiction shows "the need to fill some lack in himself". He noted that Kendall's main wish was "To have his father's love and respect. Kendall wishes to have his father's approval, and so he's trying to act the way his father would act", adding, "Kendall is not like his father, but he is trying so hard to gain his father's respect. ... I think he's driven to a place where he crosses his own moral boundaries." On the problems Kendall has while conducting business, Strong felt that the character, "Just simply doesn't have that killer instinct. He's not a ruthless person; he's not an amoral operator the way his father is." Regardless, he added that the only future for Kendall is to either, "escape his family's legacy and the poison of that, or ... internalize it and become his father." Strong used The Godfather's Michael Corleone as a reference for building Kendall's arc. Brian Cox, who plays Logan, said of the character, "Kendall's a dreamer. Kendall is an addict. He does expect something for nothing. That's his biggest mistake."

=== Style and appearance ===
As a character, Kendall Roy has been noted for his fashion sense, and compared to other characters on the show, he has been said to have "a definitive style." Jeremy Strong worked very closely with the show's costume designer, Michelle Matland, regarding Kendall's appearance. "Strong is very, very involved in everything to do with his character—down to his underpants and socks. Every detail has to be fully Kendall," she recalled, even pointing out that, indeed, the underwear had to come from "some incredibly hard-to-come-by European brand." Matland has said that Strong brought his fashion knowledge to the character, and was very opinionated on the issue. "His clothing is all super high-end, top of the line ... Whatever it costs, Kendall would wear it, because he's not looking at the money." Strong has said that "fashion is a passion" of his. GQ said "When not in a regular business suit, he wears the kind of haute-businessman threads that are bland yet clearly expensive." His clothes fit his role in the show of "uber-wealthy businessman", often wearing labels like Brunello Cucinelli, Gucci, Tom Ford, Armani, and Loro Piana. Piana sent Strong a custom jacket, and Swiss luxury brand, Richard Mille, a watch. He also collaborated on a pair of sunglasses with brand Jacques Marie Mage. Strong said "Those are all things that I do on my own because those details just feel really important to me, and so I take initiative in that area." His casual wear has been described as "hypebeast-adjacent". Kendall's outfits often represent the point he's at in his character arc. Matland pointed out that the clothing in season one, "it's very austere, it's much darker," compared to the second where, "There's a lot of muted, muddy greens, a lot of browns." A contrast between, how his confidence in the former, was affected by the emotional toll the arc on the latter, took on him. In the fourth season he goes back to being bit "more buttoned up", with Matland noting, "He still listens to Jay-Z and still has his hip, nuanced clothing. It reflects his having become more of himself, stronger in his person." Although it would be realistic for the characters to have their own stylists due to their wealth, Tiffanie Woods, the administrator behind the Instagram account @successionfits, felt that Kendall's fashion sense was all his, recalling an episode where he wears a pair of Lanvin sneakers, "that is totally him because they're like these gaudy sneakers. A stylist wouldn't pick those out for him. Those are the little markers that they leave for interpretation for the viewer." Strong ended up keeping the sneakers. Matland thought that he's the one character on the show that has an "insight" into fashion. "When he's alone, he'll assess his clothes and think, 'Who am I? What is this saying?'"

Kendall's hairstyle also reflects the character's evolution. He normally has short slicked down hair with a side part. Strong, who has gray hair, would dye it black for the show. Angel De Angelis, the show's head hairstylist, commented, "Everyone has a business-oriented haircut on the show." In the third season his hair becomes shorter and uneven, eventually turning into a buzzcut, Angelis said this change depicted what the character was going through, "He doesn't have to look a certain way anymore, so he just let it go."

== Character biography ==
=== Early life ===
Kendall Logan Roy was born in England in 1978 to media mogul Logan Roy and English aristocrat Lady Caroline Collingwood. The first son of the marriage, he has two younger siblings Roman and Siobhan "Shiv" Roy, and an older half-brother, Connor, from Logan's first marriage. As his parents divorced, he moved to New York City with his father and siblings. At age seven, while at a candy kitchen in Long Island, Logan promised Kendall that Kendall would take the reins of the company after Logan's retirement. Kendall attended the all-male Buckley School, where he met best friend Stewy Hosseini. They subsequently went to Harvard University, where Kendall was part of The Harvard Lampoon's staff. During that time they often attended parties and did cocaine together. After graduating, he spent time in Shanghai learning the fundamentals of the family business; there, he spent time with Nate Sofrelli, who later became involved with Shiv. With his wife, Rava, Kendall has a daughter, Sophie, and a son, Iverson, though the series finale reveals that the legitimacy of both children is uncertain. His substance abuse issues led to the breakdown of his marriage to Rava and a months-long stint in rehab.

=== Appearances ===
==== Season 1 ====
Kendall is Logan's presumed heir upon the latter's retirement, but Logan announces during his 80th birthday that he will remain CEO indefinitely. During this time, Kendall narrowly negotiates Waystar's acquisition of media startup Vaulter, whose founder Lawrence Yee holds Kendall and Waystar in contempt. After Logan suffers a stroke and is admitted to the hospital, it is agreed that Kendall become acting CEO with Roman as COO. Kendall consults Stewy's financial aid to prevent having to repay Waystar's $3 billion debt from its expansion into parks, unaware that Stewy is allied with Logan's longtime rival Sandy Furness. Logan eventually recovers from his stroke and announces that he will return as CEO, but continues displaying erratic behavior. Kendall plots a vote of no confidence against his father, but it fails and Logan fires him for his disloyalty. A bitter Kendall relapses on drugs during a family therapy retreat, and spends the following weeks aggressively investing in startups while on a binge. During Tom's bachelor party, Kendall is approached by Stewy and Sandy, who offer to buy out his share of Waystar for half a billion; a vengeful Kendall instead proposes a hostile takeover that will grant them a controlling interest in the company and name him CEO. Kendall serves Logan with the bid during Shiv's wedding. However, he later gets into a car accident while under the influence of drugs, resulting in the death of a caterer from the wedding. Logan promises to make the case go away if Kendall backs out of the takeover; Kendall obliges and breaks down crying in his father's arms.

==== Season 2 ====
Over the following months, Kendall, still reeling from the trauma of the accident, becomes staunchly loyal to Logan, who names him his co-COO alongside Roman in order to help fight the takeover bid. Logan forces him to shut down Vaulter, as its poor performance is proving a financial sink for Waystar. Logan decides to buy rival news giant Pierce Global Media (PGM); during a weekend retreat between the Roys and Pierces, Kendall begins a sexual relationship with Naomi Pierce, a fellow addict and influential board member whom he convinces to back the acquisition. However, the deal ultimately fails after Waystar's decades-long cover-up of sexual exploitation on the company's cruise lines becomes public. The Roys are called to testify before the Senate, and Kendall delivers a combative performance that wins them the case but sets the company back against the shareholders, who demand accountability. Despite being privately advised by investors to accept responsibility himself, Logan chooses Kendall to take the fall for the scandal, as he was across the cover-up during his tenure as CEO. Kendall obliges, and asks his father whether he ever saw him fit to run the company, but Logan tells him he is not the "killer" he must be in order to succeed. The following morning, Kendall gives a press conference where he is set to accept the blame for the scandal, but he suddenly deviates from his prepared remarks and names Logan personally responsible for overseeing the cover-up of the crimes.

==== Season 3 ====
Kendall takes on a manic, self-aggrandizing zeal following his announcement, frequently ignoring the advice of his lawyers and PR consultants in favor of chasing publicity. He also unsuccessfully attempts to convince his siblings to join him against their father. Kendall's legal battle with Waystar dissipates after his poor performance in a testimony to the Department of Justice, who deem the documents Kendall has recovered on the cruises scandal to be insufficient legal ammunition against Waystar and instead reach a settlement with the company. On his 40th birthday, Kendall receives an offer from Logan to buy out his shares in the company for $2 billion. Kendall gives up on trying to defeat his father and decides to take the buyout to permanently uncouple himself from the family, but Logan ultimately refuses his request and rebuffs him, prompting a despondent Kendall to attempt suicide by drowning while in Tuscany for his mother's wedding. During the wedding, Kendall suffers an emotional breakdown and confesses his role in the fatal car accident at Shiv's wedding to Shiv and Roman, who support him. The three learn Logan is selling Waystar to tech giant GoJo without their input, jeopardizing their control of the company, and decide to form a supermajority to veto Logan's decision. However, Tom tips off Logan on the children's revolt, allowing him to renegotiate his divorce settlement with Caroline prior to the children's arrival and deprive them of their voting power in the holding company. The siblings are effectively left powerless within Waystar.

==== Season 4 ====
Six months later, Kendall, Roman and Shiv are estranged from Logan and planning an independent media venture they call "The Hundred". However, on Logan's birthday, they learn their father is attempting to buy PGM again, and successfully outbid him. They then partner with Stewy and Sandi, who want to negotiate a price increase for the GoJo sale, to spitefully pressure Logan into renegotiating the deal with GoJo founder Lukas Matsson. However, Logan dies en route to his meeting with Matsson in Sweden; the siblings learn of his death while at Connor's wedding. At Logan's wake, Frank finds an undated document in Logan's safe naming Kendall his successor. Kendall is profoundly affected by this news, but agrees to run the company alongside Roman to honor the stipulation that COO take over. Drawn to the power of being CEO and skeptical of Matsson's vision for the company, Kendall enlists Roman's aid in sabotaging the GoJo deal. He delivers a bombastic product launch at Waystar's Investor Day in hopes of driving up the company's valuation and rendering GoJo's acquisition untenable, and later attempts to block the sale on regulatory grounds. Upon learning that GoJo has inflated its subscriber count in India, Kendall proposes to Frank that Waystar buy GoJo with Kendall as the sole CEO. On election night, Kendall is uncomfortable with Mencken due to blowback from his extreme politics affecting his daughter Sophie. Kendall ponders backing Jiménez for his family's sake, but learns from Greg that Shiv is working with Matsson; hurt by his sister's betrayal, he throws in his support for Mencken. The Roys arrive at Logan's funeral amidst street protests that have broken out following the announcement of Mencken's win. Upon learning that Shiv has brokered a deal to allow the GoJo deal to go through in exchange for naming an American CEO, Kendall enlists Roman and Hugo to join him against Shiv at the final board vote on the acquisition. The next day Kendall scrambles to secure board votes to block the GoJo deal. He and Shiv visit Caroline's estate in Barbados, where Roman is recovering from his wounds. Upon learning that Matsson plans to betray her, Shiv joins forces with Kendall. The siblings then agree to let Kendall take over, forming a voting bloc. The board comes to a 6–6 tie over selling to GoJo. Shiv, however, has second thoughts about Kendall's competence, and votes in favor of the deal despite Kendall's protests. Tom is appointed CEO with Shiv by his side; Kendall, followed by Colin, takes a stroll down Battery Park and contemplates his future.

== Reception ==
=== Accolades ===
Strong's performance in the role has received universal acclaim from critics, having won him a Primetime Emmy Award for Outstanding Lead Actor in a Drama Series in 2020. He also received the Golden Globe Award for Best Actor – Television Series Drama, Screen Actors Guild Award for Outstanding Performance by an Ensemble in a Drama Series, a Critics' Choice Television Award for Best Actor in a Drama Series and a Satellite Award for Best Supporting Actor – Series, Miniseries or Television Film.

=== Critical reception ===
In a review of the show's first two episodes, Jake Nevis of The Guardian described Strong as, "an impressive lead, possessed of a toxic masculinity complex to rival that of Patrick Bateman or Gordon Gekko. ... Beneath the machismo, though, is a fragile prodigal son, recently back from rehab and still acclimating to the dick-measuring contest that is venture capitalism."

In 2019, Kyle McGovern of GQ wrote, "Tuning out Succession obviously also means you're robbing yourself of Strong's performance, which belongs in the conversation for most complex and committed work on television right now." TVLine named Strong "Performer of the Year" in 2021 for his work on Succession, writing, "For three seasons now, Strong has been carefully crafting a portrait of a little boy lost, a man who knows how to play the corporate hero but doesn't know how to be OK with himself. ... Succession remains one of the best shows on television in large part because Strong’s central performance is so complex and so fascinating."

Upon the series finale, Michael Schulman of The New Yorker, said of Kendall Roy: "We'll be saying goodbye to one of contemporary television's great characters, arguably the protagonist of Jesse Armstrong’s stacked ensemble," while TVLine wrote, "it was a fittingly grand final act for Strong, as he found an exquisite pathos in Kendall’s downfall and put the finishing touches on one of the best TV performances of the past decade." The Times described him as "a bruised antihero and mess, the best TV character of the past decade." In 2025, Variety chose Strong's portrayal of Roy, as the second best television performance of the 21st century so far.
