= Austerlitz (Succession) =

- Succession episode
- Episode no.: Season 1 Episode 7
- Directed by: Miguel Arteta
- Written by: Lucy Prebble
- Original air date: July 15, 2018
- Running time: 62 minutes

Guest appearances
- Eric Bogosian as Gil Eavis; Justine Lupe as Willa; J. Smith-Cameron as Gerri Kellman; Ashley Zukerman as Nate Sofrelli; Arian Moayed as Stewy Hosseini; Dagmara Domińczyk as Karolina; David Rasche as Karl; Griffin Dunne as Dr. Alon Parfit; Scott Nicholson as Colin

Episode chronology
← Previous "Which Side Are You On?"	Next → "Prague"
- Succession season 1

"Austerlitz" is the seventh episode of the first season of the American satirical comedy-drama television series Succession. It was written by Lucy Prebble and directed by Miguel Arteta, and originally aired on HBO on July 15, 2018.

In the episode, the Roys attend a family therapy session at Connor's ranch in New Mexico, in an attempt to repair Logan's public image in the fallout of Kendall's failed vote of no confidence against him. Kendall, meanwhile, breaks his sobriety before appearing at the ranch. The episode introduces Eric Bogosian in a recurring role as Senator Gil Eavis, a nemesis of Logan's.

== Plot ==
Kendall has cut off communications with the rest of his family and is suing Logan for firing him from Waystar. Tabloids falsely suggest that Kendall, a recovering drug addict, has relapsed, and Kendall struggles to convince Rava that he has not. Meanwhile, in an effort to fix his public image after the failed no-confidence vote, Logan agrees to a weekend-long family therapy session at Austerlitz, Connor's ranch in New Mexico, which Kendall chooses not to attend.

The first therapy session, conducted by celebrity psychologist Dr. Alon Parfit, proves fruitless. Shiv leaves Austerlitz to meet U.S. Senator and presidential candidate Gil Eavis, a staunch leftist who vehemently opposes Logan and his company. Nate has been attempting to persuade Shiv to work alongside him for Eavis's campaign. Shiv considers the idea more seriously after meeting Eavis, and has a sexual encounter with Nate in his car.

Kendall eventually does arrive in New Mexico and joins some locals on a cocaine and methamphetamine binge. Meanwhile, the rest of the therapy session also proves ineffectual, and Parfit is hospitalized after diving headfirst into a shallow pool and breaking several front teeth. Logan decides to give Roman more responsibilities by placing him in charge of overseeing a company satellite launch out of Japan. Roman, concerned for his brother's well-being, picks Kendall up from his relapse that night and takes him back to the ranch.

Kendall returns to find the rest of the family in a heated argument. Logan demeans Tom and berates Shiv for meeting with his rival Eavis, and insinuates that she married Tom because she is afraid of being betrayed, causing her to leave crying. Logan also admits to planting stories in the tabloids of Kendall's drug use prior to his actual relapse. Connor admits that he feels "used" by his father turning Austerlitz into merely another stage for waging his business-related conflicts. Still heavily intoxicated, Kendall accuses his father of resenting his children for the privilege in which he raised them, and nearly provokes a physical altercation when he flippantly dismisses the abuse Logan suffered at the hands of his uncle Noah.

The next morning, the rest of the Roy children leave Austerlitz, and Connor expresses his hope that Willa will grow to love him. Logan goes for a private swim with only Marcia present, revealing visible scars across his back, seemingly from his childhood abuse.

== Production ==
"Austerlitz" was written by playwright Lucy Prebble and directed by Miguel Arteta. The episode was filmed on location in various parts of New Mexico including Santa Fe. It is the only episode of the series in which that character of Greg Hirsch (Nicholas Braun) does not appear.

The character of Gil Eavis is loosely based on U.S. Senator Bernie Sanders, as several critics have pointed out. Actor Bogosian said that he avoided trying to directly impersonate Sanders in his portrayal, but drew inspiration from the "sense of indignation that wells up from [the] gut" that he observed in Sanders towards issues he is passionate about.

The title of the episode, named after Connor's New Mexico ranch, is derived from the Battle of Austerlitz, a key flashpoint in the Napoleonic Wars. Throughout the series, Connor is shown to have an obsessive fascination with Napoleonic history.

== Reception ==
=== Ratings ===
The episode was watched by 0.626 million viewers, earning a 0.16 in the 18-49 rating demographics on the Nielsen Media Research scale. This means that 0.16 percent of all households with televisions watched the episode. This was a slight decrease from the previous episode, which was watched by 0.673 million viewers with a 0.20 in the 18–49 demographics.

=== Critical reception ===
"Austerlitz" received positive reviews, with critics praising Jeremy Strong's performance and the episode's balance between humor and darker themes. Randall Colburn of The A.V. Club gave the episode a B, calling Strong "fucking fantastic" in his portrayal of Kendall's relapse. Colburn also praised the episode for framing its exploration of aristocratic privilege and resentment through Logan, the series' "richest and most powerful character." Vox felt the episode was a "neat microcosm" of the series in the way it balanced comedy and melodrama, and described the episode as a "showcase for each character's human flaws and insecurities, as the pretext of a family sit-down brings every character together under a single roof and holds a magnifying glass to the bonds between them." The review also praised Strong for giving "perhaps the most impressive performance on the show," comparing Kendall's arc in the episode to that of Peter Capaldi's character in Succession showrunner Jesse Armstrong's previous series, The Thick Of It. Sean T. Collins of Decider was less positive about the episode, criticizing Shiv's subplot as "dull" and finding the reveal regarding Logan's past to be an unconvincing development for his character. However, Collins reserved praise for Strong, saying that his performance as Kendall worked "beautifully and unequivocally," and called his depiction of Kendall's relapse "gripping."
