= Which Side Are You On? (Succession) =

- Succession episode
- Episode no.: Season 1 Episode 6
- Directed by: Andrij Parekh
- Written by: Susan Soon He Stanton
- Original air date: July 8, 2018
- Running time: 63 minutes

Guest appearances
- James Cromwell as Ewan Roy; J. Smith-Cameron as Gerri Kellman; Arian Moayed as Stewy Hosseini; Ashley Zukerman as Nate Sofrelli; David Rasche as Karl; Eisa Davis as Joyce Miller; David Patrick Kelly as Paul Chambers; Juliana Canfield as Jess Jordan; Scott Nicholson as Colin; Jacqueline Antaramian as Ilona Shinoy

Episode chronology
| ← Previous "I Went to Market" | Next → "Austerlitz" |
- Succession season 1

"Which Side Are You On?" is the sixth episode of the first season of the American satirical comedy-drama television series Succession. It was written by Susan Soon He Stanton and directed by Andrij Parekh, and originally aired on HBO on July 8, 2018.

The episode sees Kendall attempt to stage a vote of no confidence against his father among members of Waystar's board, while Shiv gets closer to a promising but dangerous next step in her political career.

== Plot ==
As the vote of no confidence against Logan approaches, Kendall works to assemble as many of Waystar's shareholders to his side as possible. Roman helps out by convincing Lawrence, who is still at odds with Kendall, to take his side. Logan, meanwhile, arrives in Washington, D.C. to meet with the President of the United States, but the meeting is cut short at the last minute amid a possible terror threat. Logan is incensed and believes he has been snubbed.

Shiv has dinner with her ex-boyfriend and fellow political fixer Nate, who floats the possibility of the two of them working for Logan's political nemesis on his presidential campaign. Shiv later spends the night in Nate's apartment, albeit in a separate room; the two of them nonetheless remain sexually attracted to one another despite both being engaged.

Tom decides to reward Greg for seemingly destroying the documents pertaining to misconduct on the company's cruises by treating him to an expensive dinner. Greg, however, is obliged to first have dinner with his grandfather Ewan. Ewan informs Greg that he is there to attend the vote against Logan, and advises that Greg stay out of the matter. Greg then attends his second dinner of the night with Tom and mentions the vote; Tom is surprised, having not been told about it beforehand, and calls Kendall to get up to date on the situation.

Kendall, meanwhile, visits an unsuspecting Logan and has an amicable home dinner with him on Marcia's request. The next morning, he flies to Long Island to secure the vote of ailing board member Ilona Shinoy, who is still ambivalent about ousting Logan. Kendall manages to sway her to his side, but is unable to fly back to Manhattan, which has temporarily become a no-fly zone in the wake of the terror threat. Kendall attempts to take a cab back to Waystar's offices, but gets stuck in traffic and rushes to the meeting on foot.

As the board meeting begins, Kendall is forced to instigate the motion of no confidence over the phone. Logan refuses to leave the room while the vote takes place and berates the board members as they vote; although Frank follows through his support for the motion, Stewy, Lawrence and Gerri all fail to speak up against Logan, while Ewan sides with his brother. Roman's deciding vote is unclear, but Logan insists it is for him and Roman concurs. Kendall finally arrives at the boardroom, but Logan fires him alongside everyone else who voted in favor of the motion, Frank included. A devastated Kendall is escorted out of the building by security. Later in the day, the President calls Logan back after the terror threat subsides; Logan remarks on having dealt with a terrorist himself.

== Production ==
"Which Side Are You On?" was written by Susan Soon He Stanton and directed by Andrij Parekh, who also served as the series' cinematographer for several episodes of the season. The title derives from the song of the same name by social activist Florence Reece, who wrote it on behalf of the United Mine Workers labor union. Pete Seeger's rendition of the song plays at the end of the episode as Logan takes a call from the President of the United States.

Series showrunner Jesse Armstrong told Vanity Fair that the vote of no confidence against Logan was inspired by Disney's 2004 shareholder meeting, in which Michael Eisner was voted out of his position as the company's chairman after 20 years of holding the title. Eisner nonetheless retained his position on the board and stayed with Disney for another year before being replaced by Bob Iger.

== Reception ==
=== Ratings ===
The episode was watched by 0.673 million viewers, earning a 0.20 in the 18–49 rating demographics on the Nielsen Media Research ratings scale. This means that 0.20 percent of all households with televisions watched the episode. This was a slight increase from the previous episode, which was watched by 0.583 million viewers with a 0.17 in the 18–49 demographics.

=== Critical reception ===
"Which Side Are You On?" received critical acclaim, with many reviewers considering it a turning point for the series' quality. Randall Colburn of The A.V. Club gave the episode an A−, praising the "queasiness" of Parekh's direction during the episode's climax and crediting the performances of Brian Cox and Peter Friedman for giving the scene its energy. Vox called the episode's ending sequence "heart-pounding" and suggested that the episode helped the series grow into "one of the most deftly executed dramas currently on TV." In contrast, Sean T. Collins of Decider was less positive about the episode, admitting that "a whole lot of viewers were firmly on Succession's side" after viewing it, but personally criticizing the episode's climax as contrived and "[thrown] out of balance" by the introduction of too many new characters to represent the company's board. Collins, however, praised Cox and Jeremy Strong's performances.
