= Jacques Marie Mage =

Eyewear designer and manufacturer

- Jacques Marie Mage Logo
- Founded: 2014
- Type: Private company
- Headquarters: 927 N Sycamore Ave Los Angeles, California 90038
- Products: Sunglasses; Glasses; Jewelry; Small Leather Goods
- Founder: Jérôme Mage
- Website: JMM official

Jacques Marie Mage, sometimes abbreviated as JMM, is a luxury eyewear brand that manufactures its designs in limited production runs. Designer Jérôme Mage founded the company in 2014.

== History ==
Jacques Marie Mage's founder, Jérôme Mage, began his career designing eyewear for brands in Southern California. The brand’s 2015 launch debuted its thick, sculpted, frames when the industry mainstream was focused on minimalist design.

The brand's first collection was released in 2015, and included the DEALAN, a Wayfarer-like style produced using plant-based acetate, inspired by eyewear worn by Bob Dylan in the sixties. In 2019, the company collaborated with the Hunter S. Thompson Estate to release a limited-edition aviator model inspired by the journalist’s distinctive eyewear, under license from the Gonzo Foundation.

Past partnerships include a three-style collaboration with actor and musician Jeff Goldblum that began in the summer of 2021 Goldblum has named his Jacques Marie Mage glasses as one of "his most signature pieces" in the Autumn of 2024. In 2023, the brand worked with actor Jeremy Strong on a custom collection; in 2024, JMM launched their third collaboration with acclaimed fashion editor George Cortina, promoted in a campaign that featured Duke Nicholson, and Devon Lee Carlson, streetwear retailer, Union, model and designer Erin Wasson. Other partners include Olivier Theyskens, Kate Bosworth, and Enfants Riches Déprimés.

== Production ==
The company's frames are designed in the United States and manufactured in Japan and Italy. Its products are manufactured by ateliers in a process that takes 18 months and involves 300 steps.

It sources materials such as Takiron acetate and beta titanium from Japan. Some of its models also include inlays made from precious stones, 18-karat gold filigrees and sterling silver accents.

Known for its limited product runs, the brand releases each model in small, serialized batches, producing no more than 500 pairs per design.
