= Jesse Armstrong =

English screenwriter and producer (born 1970)

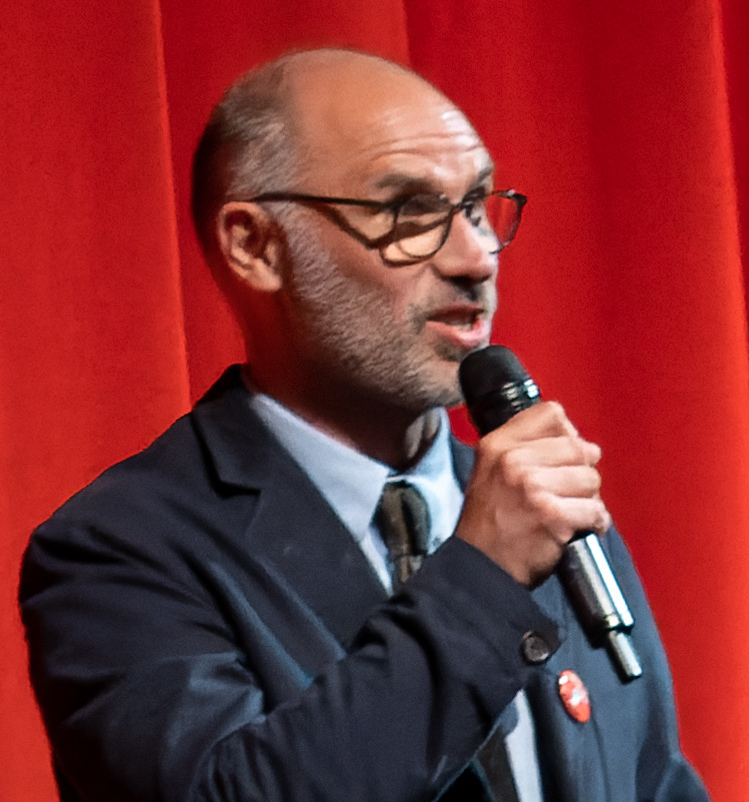
- Armstrong in 2023
- Born: Jesse David Armstrong; 13 December 1970 (age 55); Oswestry, Shropshire, England
- Education: University of Manchester
- Occupations: Screenwriter, author, producer
- Years active: 2000–present
- Children: 2

Jesse David Armstrong (born 13 December 1970) is an English screenwriter and producer. Known for writing for a string of critically acclaimed British comedy series as well as satirical dramas, he has received numerous accolades including two British Academy Television Awards, three Golden Globe Awards, three Writers Guild of America Awards, and eight Primetime Emmy Awards in addition to nominations for an Academy Award and two British Academy Film Awards.

He first gained prominence co-creating the British comedy shows Peep Show (2003–2015) and Fresh Meat (2011–2016) with his writing partner Sam Bain. During this time he wrote for the political satire series The Thick of It (2005–2009) and co-wrote In the Loop (2009), the latter of which earned him Academy Award and BAFTA nominations for Best Adapted Screenplay. He also co-wrote the films Four Lions (2010) and Downhill (2020). Armstrong made his directorial debut with the television film Mountainhead (2025) which he also wrote.

He gained acclaim for creating the HBO comedy-drama series Succession (2018–2023) earning four consecutive wins of the Primetime Emmy Award for Outstanding Writing for a Drama Series for writing episodes of the first, second, third and fourth seasons of Succession.

== Early life and education ==
Armstrong was born in Oswestry, England, close to the England–Wales border. His father was a further education teacher who became a crime novelist in the 1990s, while his mother worked in nursery schools. He attended a comprehensive school in Oswestry before studying American Studies at the University of Manchester, spending a year abroad at the University of Massachusetts in Amherst.

== Career ==
=== First jobs ===
In 1995, he began to work as a researcher for the Labour MP Doug Henderson, initially without payment. At the same time, he acted as a consultant on politics for Rory Bremner's production company. He subsequently worked as a painter and decorator.

=== 2000–2015: Peep Show and The Thick of It ===
Armstrong met his writing partner Sam Bain while at the University of Manchester, living with him in his final year. They began writing together after they graduated, when they had both moved to London. At the beginning of their writing career, Armstrong and Bain wrote for the Channel 4 sketch show Smack the Pony and the children's shows The Queen's Nose and My Parents Are Aliens. They went on to create and write Peep Show, BBC One sitcom The Old Guys, and Channel 4 comedy dramas Fresh Meat and Babylon. They also wrote for the BBC Radio 4 sketch show That Mitchell and Webb Sound, starring Peep Show's two main actors David Mitchell and Robert Webb, and its BBC Two adaptation That Mitchell and Webb Look. Peep Show has won several writing awards, including a BAFTA for Best Situation Comedy in 2008.

To date, Armstrong and Bain have written two films together – the 2007 comedy Magicians, and, alongside Chris Morris, the 2010 terrorism satire Four Lions. Armstrong and Bain received the Writers' Guild of Great Britain Award at the British Comedy Awards 2010. In 2012 both Armstrong and Bain were featured on the TV industry journal Broadcast's 'Hot 100' list, highlighting the most successful people in UK television. In 2012, Armstrong and Bain wrote the Channel 4 comedy pilot Bad Sugar, a spoof of Dynasty-style soap operas, which stars Olivia Colman, Julia Davis and Sharon Horgan, all of whom also co-conceived the show. In 2014, Armstrong, with Danny Boyle, Robert Jones and Sam Bain, co-created the Channel 4 comedy drama Babylon. Armstrong wrote the first and last of the six initial episodes and co-wrote the pilot with Sam Bain.

Alongside Armando Iannucci, Simon Blackwell and Tony Roche, Armstrong wrote for the first three series of the BAFTA-winning BBC Four comedy The Thick of It, and its 2009 film spin-off In the Loop. In The Loop was nominated for the Academy Award and BAFTA Award for Best Adapted Screenplay, and won Best British Screenplay at the 2009 Evening Standard British Film Awards. Alongside The Thick of It's writing team, Armstrong wrote one episode of the first season of HBO comedy series Veep, set in the office of the American vice-president.

In the run-up to the 2010 UK general election, Armstrong wrote a column in The Guardian – 'Malcolm Tucker's election briefing – as dictated to Jesse Armstrong'. He previously wrote a similar column for New Statesman, entitled 'Tactical Briefing'. In 2010, Armstrong's currently-unproduced screenplay Murdoch, a drama in which Rupert Murdoch and his family disagree over who should have control of his company, received attention after it appeared on The Black List, a list of unproduced screenplays most liked by Hollywood industry figures. In the wake of the 2011 phone hacking scandal involving newspapers owned by Murdoch it was rumoured that the script was being developed by Channel 4, but Armstrong dismissed these claims.

In 2010 it was reported that Armstrong was developing a biopic of the Republican Party strategist Lee Atwater, with Chris Henchy and Adam McKay. In October 2011 it was reported that Armstrong's film adaptation of Richard DiLello's book The Longest Cocktail Party, charting the founding of The Beatles' record company Apple Records and the recording of their final album Let It Be, was to be directed by Michael Winterbottom. In February 2016 it was reported that Winterbottom had withdrawn from the project and the film's future was uncertain.

Armstrong wrote one episode of Charlie Brooker's anthology series Black Mirror, entitled "The Entire History of You". Robert Downey Jr. has since bought the rights to adapt the script for a forthcoming film. Armstrong's first novel, Love, Sex and Other Foreign Policy Goals, was released in April 2015.

=== 2017–present: Succession and acclaim ===
In 2017, Armstrong's American drama series Succession, executive produced by Adam McKay and Will Ferrell, was picked up to series by HBO. The series starred Jeremy Strong, Sarah Snook, Kieran Culkin, Matthew Macfadyen and Brian Cox. The series ran from 2018 to 2023 and received numerous accolades including three Primetime Emmy Awards for Outstanding Drama Series. During this time he co-wrote the screenplay for the 2020 comedy-drama film Downhill with Jim Rash and Nat Faxon. The film was based on the 2014 Ruben Östlund film Force Majeure and starred Will Ferrell and Julia Louis-Dreyfus. In 2025, Armstrong worked with HBO again to make his directorial debut, a television film called Mountainhead which he also wrote.

== Personal life ==
Armstrong is married and has two children. His wife works for the National Health Service. They live in South London. Armstrong is a supporter of Fulham F.C.

== Works ==
=== Film ===
Year	Title	Director	Writer	Producer
2007	Magicians	No	Yes	Associate
2009	In the Loop	No	Yes	No
2010	Four Lions	No	Yes	No
2019	The Day Shall Come	No	Yes	No
2020	Downhill	No	Yes	No

Short film

Year	Title	Director	Writer
2012	Bad Sugar	No	Yes
2013	No Kaddish in Carmarthen	Yes	Yes
2015	Incident on the Northern Line	Yes	Yes

=== Television ===
Year	Title	Writer	Executive Producer	Creator	Notes
2000	My Parents Are Aliens	Yes	No	No	Episode: "El Presidente"
2000–2002	Smack the Pony	Yes	No	No	Additional material
2001	2DTV	Yes	No	No	
2001–2002	TV to Go	Yes	No	No	
2001–2003	The Queen's Nose	Yes	No	No	6 episodes
2002	Seriously Weird	Yes	No	No	
2002	Ed Stone Is Dead	Yes	No	No	
2003	The Story of Tracy Beaker	Yes	No	No	2 episodes
2003	Bedsitcom	Yes	No	No	
2003–2015	Peep Show	Yes	Yes	Yes	
2004	Revolver	Yes	No	No	5 episodes
2005–2009	The Thick of It	Yes	No	No	15 episodes
2006	The Secret Policeman's Ball	Yes	No	No	Television special
2006	The Last Laugh	Yes	No	No	
2006–2009	That Mitchell and Webb Look	Yes	No	No	6 episodes
2007	Dogface	Yes	No	No	5 episodes
2007	Ladies and Gentlemen	Yes	No	No	Television pilot
2008	Charlie Brooker's Screenwipe	Yes	No	No	
2009–2010	The Old Guys	Yes	Yes	Yes	
2011	Black Mirror	Yes	No	No	Episode: "The Entire History of You"
2011–2016	Fresh Meat	Yes	Yes	Yes	
2012	Veep	Yes	No	No	Episode: "Tears"
2012	Bad Sugar	Yes	No	No	TV pilot
2014	Babylon	Yes	Yes	Yes	
2015	University Challenge	No	No	No	Contestant; 2 episodes
2016	Fleabag	No	No	No	Script consultant; Episode: "Episode 2"
2017	Back	No	No	No	Story consultant
2018–2023	Succession	Yes	Yes	Yes	16 episodes
2019–2021	Dead Pixels	No	Yes	No	
2019–2024	What We Do in the Shadows	No	No	No	Executive consultant; 61 episodes
2025	Mountainhead	Yes	Yes	Yes	Television film; directorial debut

=== Bibliography ===
- Armstrong, Jesse (2015). Love, Sex and Other Foreign Policy Goals. Vintage. ISBN 9780399184208.

== Awards and nominations ==
Year	Award	Category	Nominated work	Result	Ref.
2009	Academy Awards	Best Adapted Screenplay	In the Loop	Nominated	
2022	Astra TV Awards	Best Writing in a Broadcast Network or Cable Series, Drama	Succession (Episode: "All the Bells Say")	Nominated	
2023	Astra TV Awards	Best Writing in a Broadcast Network or Cable Series, Drama	Succession (Episode: "Connor's Wedding")	Won	
2009	British Academy Film Awards	Best Adapted Screenplay	In the Loop	Nominated	
2009	British Academy Film Awards	Outstanding British Film	In the Loop	Nominated	
2006	British Academy Television Awards	Best Situation Comedy	Peep Show	Nominated	
2008	British Academy Television Awards	Best Situation Comedy	Peep Show	Won	
2009	British Academy Television Awards	Best Situation Comedy	Peep Show	Nominated	
2010	British Academy Television Awards	Best Situation Comedy	Peep Show	Nominated	
2011	British Academy Television Awards	Best Situation Comedy	Peep Show	Nominated	
2012	British Academy Television Awards	Best Situation Comedy	Fresh Meat	Nominated	
2016	British Academy Television Awards	Best Scripted Comedy	Peep Show	Nominated	
2009	British Academy Television Craft Awards	Best Writer	Peep Show	Nominated	
2010	British Academy Television Craft Awards	Best Writer	The Thick of It	Nominated	
2014	British Academy Television Craft Awards	Best Writer: Comedy	Fresh Meat	Nominated	
2016	British Academy Television Craft Awards	Best Writer: Comedy	Peep Show	Nominated	
2020	British Academy Television Craft Awards	Best Writer: Drama	Succession	Won	
2022	British Academy Television Craft Awards	Best Writer: Drama	Succession	Nominated	
2009	British Comedy Awards	Best TV Comedy	Peep Show	Nominated	
2010	British Comedy Awards	Writers' Guild of Great Britain Award	—N/a	Won	
2011	British Comedy Awards	Best Sitcom	Peep Show	Nominated	
2011	British Comedy Awards	Best Comedy Drama	Fresh Meat	Nominated	
2011	British Comedy Awards	Best British TV Comedy	Fresh Meat	Won	
2009	British Independent Film Awards	Best Screenplay	In the Loop	Won	
2010	British Independent Film Awards	Best Screenplay	Four Lions	Nominated	
2006	Broadcasting Press Guild Awards	Writer's Award	The Thick of It	Won	
2010	Broadcasting Press Guild Awards	Writer's Award	The Thick of It	Won	
2012	Broadcasting Press Guild Awards	Best Comedy/Entertainment	Fresh Meat	Nominated	
2013	Broadcasting Press Guild Awards	Best Entertainment/Comedy	Fresh Meat	Nominated	
2010	Central Ohio Film Critics Association Awards	Best Original Screenplay	Four Lions	Nominated	
2009	Chicago Film Critics Association Awards	Best Adapted Screenplay	In the Loop	Nominated	
2010	Chicago Film Critics Association Awards	Best Original Screenplay	Four Lions	Nominated	
2009	Chlotrudis Awards	Best Original Screenplay	In the Loop	Won	
2025	Directors Guild of America Awards	Outstanding Directing – Movies for Television	Mountainhead	Nominated	
2019	Golden Globe Awards	Best Television Series – Drama	Succession	Won	
2021	Golden Globe Awards	Best Television Series – Drama	Succession	Won	
2023	Golden Globe Awards	Best Television Series – Drama	Succession	Won	
2009	Houston Film Critics Society Awards	Best Screenplay	In the Loop	Nominated	
2009	International Cinephile Society Awards	Best Adapted Screenplay	In the Loop	Runner-up	
2010	International Emmy Awards	Best Comedy Series	Peep Show	Nominated	
2023	International Emmy Awards	Founders Award	—N/a	Won	
2009	London Film Critics' Circle Awards	Screenwriter of the Year	In the Loop	Won	
2010	London Film Critics' Circle Awards	Screenwriter of the Year	Four Lions	Nominated	
2009	Los Angeles Film Critics Association Awards	Best Screenplay	In the Loop	Runner-up	
2009	New York Film Critics Circle Awards	Best Screenplay	In the Loop	Won	
2009	Online Film & Television Association Awards	Best Adapted Screenplay	In the Loop	Nominated	
2012	Online Film & Television Association Awards	Best Writing in a Comedy Series	Veep	Nominated	
2009	Online Film Critics Society Awards	Best Adapted Screenplay	In the Loop	Nominated	
2019	Primetime Emmy Awards	Outstanding Drama Series	Succession	Nominated	
2019	Primetime Emmy Awards	Outstanding Writing for a Drama Series	Succession (Episode: "Nobody Is Ever Missing")	Won	
2020	Primetime Emmy Awards	Outstanding Drama Series	Succession	Won	
2020	Primetime Emmy Awards	Outstanding Writing for a Drama Series	Succession (Episode: "This Is Not for Tears")	Won	
2022	Primetime Emmy Awards	Outstanding Drama Series	Succession	Won	
2022	Primetime Emmy Awards	Outstanding Writing for a Drama Series	Succession (Episode: "All the Bells Say")	Won	
2023	Primetime Emmy Awards	Outstanding Drama Series	Succession	Won	
2023	Primetime Emmy Awards	Outstanding Writing for a Drama Series	Succession (Episode: "Connor's Wedding")	Won	
2025	Primetime Emmy Awards	Outstanding Television Movie	Mountainhead	Nominated	
2019	Producers Guild of America Awards	Outstanding Producer of Episodic Television – Drama	Succession	Won	
2021	Producers Guild of America Awards	Outstanding Producer of Episodic Television – Drama	Succession	Won	
2023	Producers Guild of America Awards	Outstanding Producer of Episodic Television – Drama	Succession	Won	
2025	Producers Guild of America Awards	Best Streamed or Televised Movie	Mountainhead	Nominated	
2005	Royal Television Society Awards	Situation Comedy & Comedy Drama	Peep Show	Nominated	
2005	Royal Television Society Awards	Writer – Comedy	Peep Show	Nominated	
2006	Royal Television Society Awards	Situation Comedy & Comedy Drama	Peep Show	Nominated	
2006	Royal Television Society Awards	Writer – Comedy	Peep Show	Won	
2009	Royal Television Society Awards	Scripted Comedy	Peep Show	Nominated	
2009	Royal Television Society Awards	Writer – Comedy	Peep Show	Won	
2011	Royal Television Society Awards	Writer – Comedy	Peep Show	Nominated	
2012	Royal Television Society Awards	Scripted Comedy	Fresh Meat	Won	
2012	Royal Television Society Awards	Writer – Comedy	Fresh Meat	Won	
2010	San Diego Film Critics Society Awards	Best Original Screenplay	Four Lions	Won	
2012	Writers Guild of America Awards	New Series	Veep	Nominated	
2018	Writers Guild of America Awards	Drama Series	Succession	Nominated	
2018	Writers Guild of America Awards	New Series	Succession	Nominated	
2019	Writers Guild of America Awards	New Series	What We Do in the Shadows	Nominated	
2019	Writers Guild of America Awards	Drama Series	Succession	Won	
2021	Writers Guild of America Awards	Drama Series	Succession	Won	
2023	Writers Guild of America Awards	Drama Series	Succession	Won	

== See also ==
- List of Academy Award winners and nominees from Great Britain
- List of Golden Globe winners
- List of Primetime Emmy Award winners
