= Emily Davis (disambiguation) =

Emily Davis may refer to:

== People ==
- Emily Davis, American actress

== Fiction ==
- The Life With Derek character played by Shadia Simmons
- The Sunset Beach character played by Cristi Harris
- The Until Dawn character played by Nichole Sakura
