= YellowBrickRoad =

- Theatrical release poster
- Directed by: Jesse Holland; Andy Mitton
- Written by: Jesse Holland; Andy Mitton
- Produced by: Eric Hungerford
- Starring: Cassidy Freeman; Anessa Ramsey; Laura Heisler
- Cinematography: Michael Hardwick
- Edited by: Judd Resnick; Jesse Holland; Andy Mitton
- Music by: Jonathan McHugh
- Production company: Points North
- Release dates: January 23, 2010 (Slamdance Film Festival); June 1, 2011 (United States)
- Running time: 98 minutes
- Country: United States
- Language: English

YellowBrickRoad is a 2010 American horror film directed by Jesse Holland and Andy Mitton and starring Cassidy Freeman, Anessa Ramsey and Laura Heisler. It is about an expedition to discover the fate of an entire town that disappeared into the wilderness 70 years earlier. Although critical reception was mixed, it won best film at the New York City Horror Film Festival. The costume designer was Robert Eggers.

The film was released as part of the Bloody Disgusting Selects line.

== Plot ==
In 1940, the entire town of Friar, New Hampshire, composing of 572 people, abandoned their town and walked into the wilderness with only the clothes on their backs after a viewing of The Wizard of Oz, a film the entire town was obsessed with. No one has ever been able to explain why they did this. Only 300 of the townspeople's bodies were recovered: some had frozen to death in the elements, while others were killed in horrific and bloody ways. The remaining 272 citizens were never found, save one survivor who "went off the trail" and is left in a state of shock. The government then designated the trail that the townspeople took as classified. Despite this, the town was eventually repopulated, although the townspeople are cautious of the town's history.

In the present day, the trail's coordinates have been declassified, and a research crew has arrived to travel the trail to learn about the disappearances and deaths, as well as what lies at the end of the trail. Crew leader Teddy found the trail's coordinates via Friar's movie theater. The crew (including Teddy's wife Melissa, their collaborator Walter, sibling cartographers Daryl and Erin Luger, forestry expert Cy, and intern Jill) soon befriends Liv, a townsperson who works at the theater and agrees to accompany them on their trip.

The journey goes well initially, but soon the crew is terrorized by loud and jarring music that appears to come out of nowhere. Daryl brutally murders his sister Erin over a petty argument and flees; Teddy and Cy locate and subdue him, and return him to the group. Now calm, he explains to Teddy that "the land is like liquid" and declares that he and Erin managed to determine the coordinates of the end of the road: the source of the music.

Ultimately the crew reverses direction, battered by deafening feedback, but discover Erin's body dressed like a scarecrow, propped up in a grotesque diorama, and a massive deadfall which Teddy attempts to climb. While Cy is distracted, Daryl steals his machete, frees himself, and flees again with the only vehicle and food supply. The group realizes that they are still traveling north, and are no closer to home than before.

Cy refuses to travel south with the others and becomes aggressive, kidnapping Liv at knifepoint in hopes that he can cross over into Vermont and save her life. Teddy and Melissa have sex that same night, but he abandons her before dawn to climb the deadfall and solve the mystery of Friar, leaving only Melissa, Walter, and Jill.

After miles of walking west alone, Liv and Cy consume hallucinogenic berries, and in a moment of clarity, Cy reveals to Liv that he has been thinking about doing "unspeakable things" to her for hours. He recommends that she bind and kill him before he can do so; once tied up he has second thoughts, but despite his pleas, she breaks his neck.

Overnight, Jill eats the remaining food. When she attempts to apologize the next morning, she is ignored, and immediately walks off a cliff to her death. Walter, preferring to die sane and at peace, commits suicide on camera. Upon viewing the video, Melissa is attacked by Daryl, and he chases her down, killing her with Cy's machete. Liv, high and delusional, finds Daryl and stabs him in the neck with a pocketknife. She then lies down in the grass and continues to consume the poisonous berries.

A weary and visibly shaken Teddy crawls to the final portion of the trail, where the music finally stops. He finds himself at what appears to be the theater from the beginning of the film. There he meets a sinister usher who orders him to sit in a theater, which is empty except for a brief glimpse of smiling theatergoers implied to be the spirits of the dead townspeople. On the screen is footage of Melissa, who speaks to him from a hellish landscape. Horrified, Teddy begins to scream.

== Cast ==
- Cassidy Freeman as Erin Luger, cartographer
- Anessa Ramsey as Melissa Barnes, co-author
- Laura Heisler as Liv McCann, local
- Clark Freeman as Daryl Luger, cartographer
- Lee Wilkof as Clerk / Usher
- Alex Draper as Walter Myrick, psychologist
- Tara Giordano as Jill, intern
- Michael Laurino as Teddy Barnes, expedition leader, co-author, photographer
- Sam Elmore as Cy Banbridge, forestry expert

== Analysis ==
Bernice M. Murphy finds similarities between this film and The Blair Witch Project (1999). In both films the horror lies in the "desperate fear of losing oneself in the wilderness". In both films the characters stray from "civilization" and go in search of something intangible, something lurking within the forests of the United States. In both, the characters also stray away from their own rationality.

Murphy says that both films belong to a tradition of "Rural Gothic" horror fiction that can be traced back to "Young Goodman Brown" (1835) by Nathaniel Hawthorne. She says that American narratives of horror fiction and Gothic fiction often take place in the forests, the same forests confronted by the settlers and explorers of the Colonial history of the United States. She argues that "Rural Gothic" is an important subgenre of the wider American Gothic tradition.

Murphy further places the film within a type of "Rural Gothic" narratives, where bad things happen to those who willingly venture into the wilderness. Such stories tend to feature the loss of a civilized way of life. She cites as other examples Edgar Huntly (1799), The Shining (1977) and its film adaptation (1980). She also cites the historical Donner Party (1846–1847) as fitting well with this trope.

== Reception ==
On the review aggregator website Rotten Tomatoes, 47% of 17 critics' reviews are positive, with an average rating of 5.2/10. In a negative review, G. Allen Johnson of San Francisco Chronicle wrote, "Yellowbrickroad is without personality. It's competently made, but the cast and direction are just bland." Horror review site Life After Undeath gave the film a largely negative review and stated that the ending "reeks of an overzealous attempt at providing a clever twist to something that may as well have remained unexplained." Meet in the Lobby offered more praise, calling it "a psychologically haunting film that leaves a rather disquieting feeling that is slow to fade even days after seeing the movie." Dennis Harvey of Variety called it "a well-crafted horror-mystery" that may frustrate audiences that look for explanations.

=== Awards ===
In 2010, YellowBrickRoad won best film at the New York City Horror Film Festival.
