= 2021 Leaders Summit on Climate =

Virtual climate summit organized by the USA

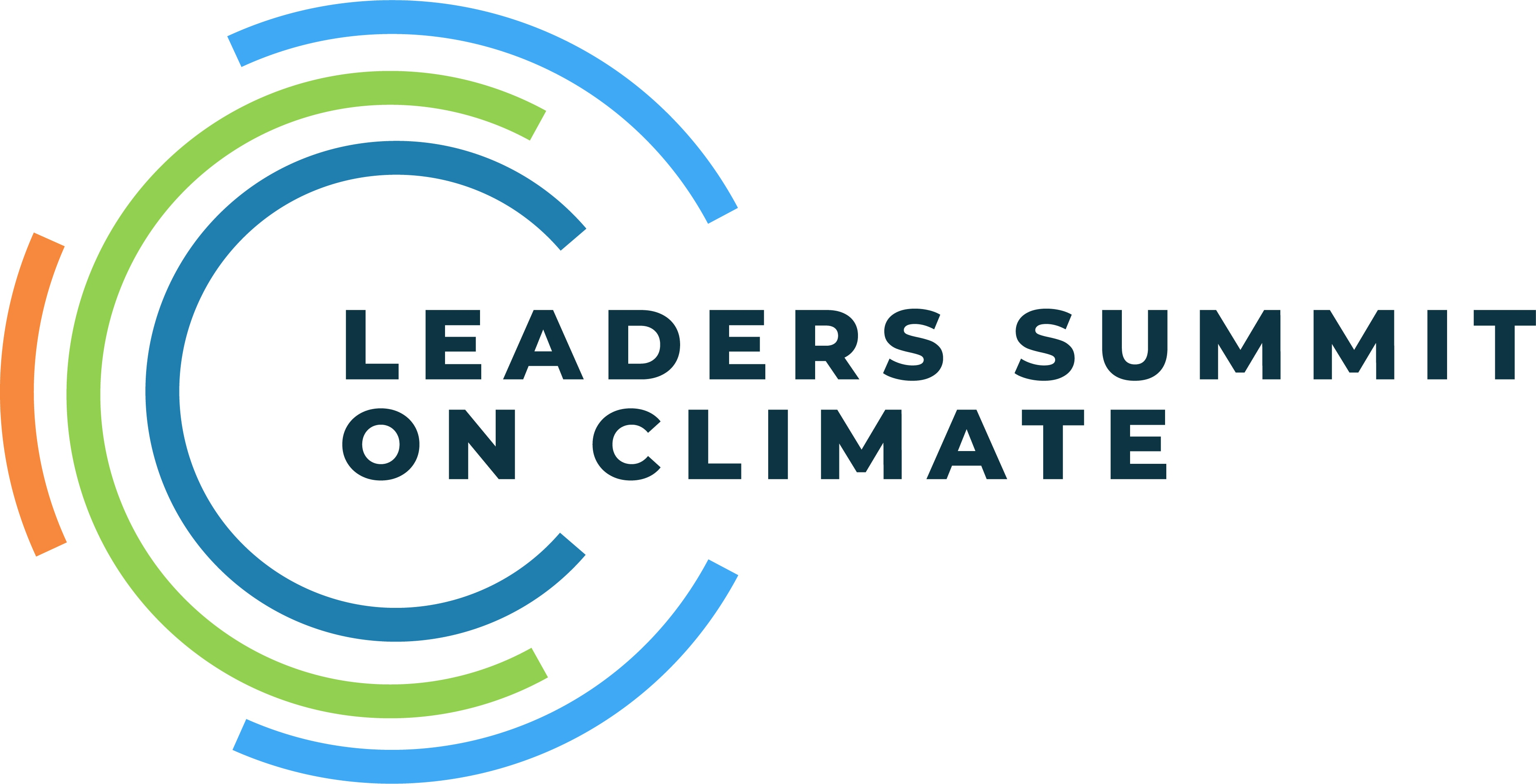
- Host country: United States
- Dates: April 22–23, 2021
- Venues: Virtual
- Participants: 38 nations
- Website: www.state.gov/leaders-summit-on-climate/

The 2021 Leaders' Summit on Climate was a virtual climate summit on April 22–23, 2021, organized by the Joe Biden administration, with leaders from various countries. At the summit Biden announced that greenhouse gas emissions by the United States would be reduced by 50% - 52% relative to the level of 2005 by 2030. Overall, the commitments made at the summit reduce the gap between governments' current pledges and the 1.5 degrees target of the Paris Agreement by 12% - 14%. If the pledges are accomplished, greenhouse gas emissions will fall by 2.6% - 3.7% more in comparison to the pledges before the summit. The results of the summit were described by Climate Action Tracker as a step forward in the fight against climate change.

== Invited countries and their representatives ==
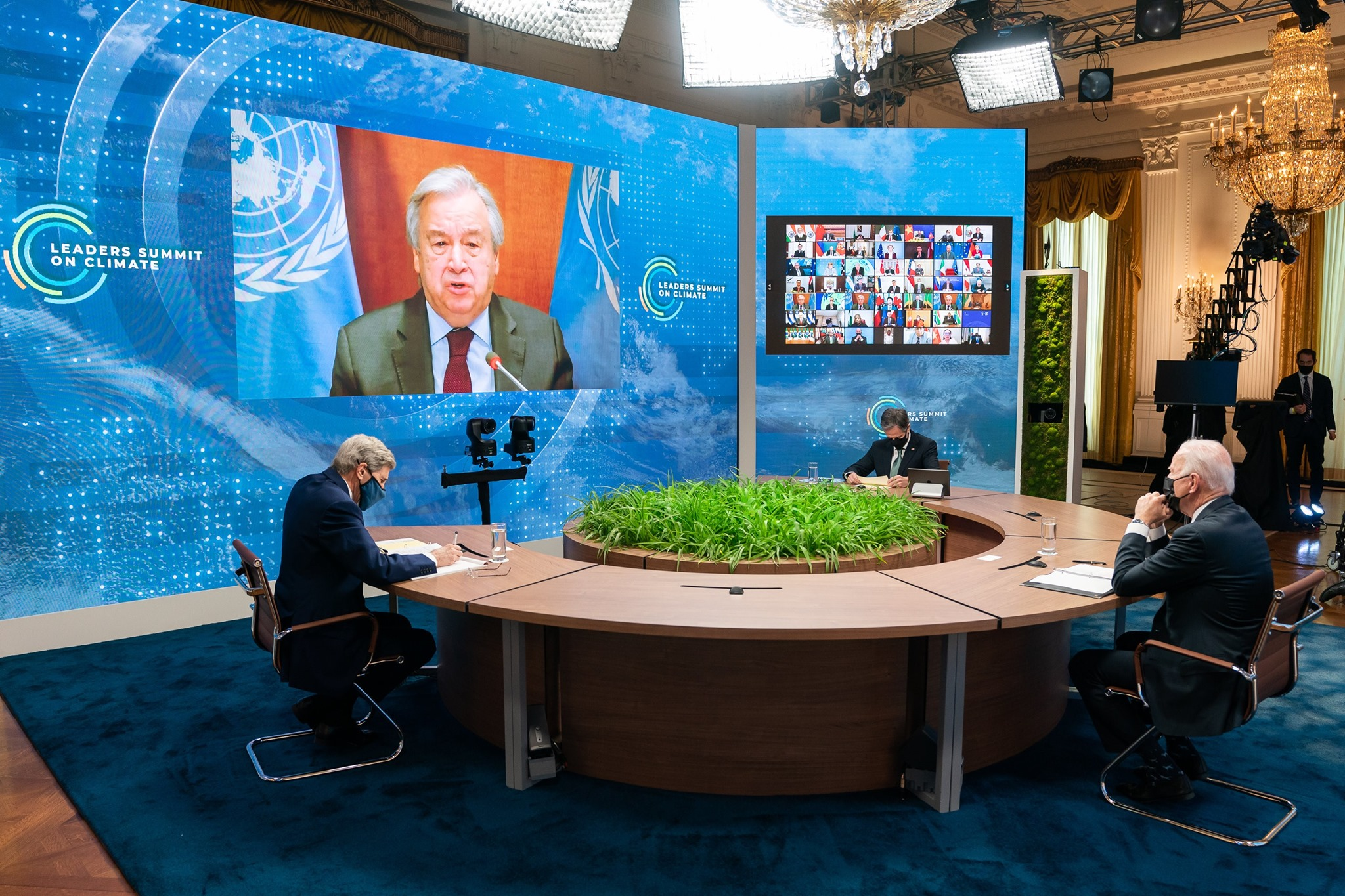
United Nations Secretary-General António Guterres addresses the Leaders Summit on Climate (April 2021)

Invited countries	Representative
South Africa	President Cyril Ramaphosa
Germany	Chancellor Angela Merkel
Antigua and Barbuda	Prime Minister Gaston Browne
Saudi Arabia	King Salman of Saudi Arabia
Argentina	President Alberto Fernández
Australia	Prime Minister Scott Morrison
Bangladesh	Prime Minister Sheikh Hasina
Brazil	President Jair Bolsonaro
Bhutan	Prime Minister Lotay Tshering
Canada	Prime Minister Justin Trudeau
Chile	President Sebastián Piñera
China	President Xi Jinping (Note: The de jure head of government of China is the Premier, whose current holder is Li Keqiang. The President of China is legally a ceremonial office, but the General Secretary of the Chinese Communist Party (de facto leader) has always held this office since 1993 except for the months of transition, and the current paramount leader is Xi Jinping.)
Colombia	President Iván Duque Márquez
South Korea	President Moon Jae-in
Denmark	Prime Minister Mette Frederiksen
United Arab Emirates	President Khalifa bin Zayed al Nahyan
Spain	Prime Minister Pedro Sánchez
France	President Emmanuel Macron
Gabon	President Ali Bongo Ondimba
India	Prime Minister Narendra Modi
Indonesia	President Joko Widodo
Israel	Prime Minister Benjamin Netanyahu
Italy	Prime Minister Mario Draghi
Jamaica	Prime Minister Andrew Holness
Japan	Prime Minister Yoshihide Suga
Mexico	President Andrés Manuel López Obrador
Nigeria	President Muhammadu Buhari
Norway	Prime Minister Erna Solberg
New Zealand	Prime Minister Jacinda Ardern
Poland	President Andrzej Duda
Kenya	President Uhuru Kenyatta
United Kingdom	Prime Minister Boris Johnson
Marshall Islands	President David Kabua
Democratic Republic of the Congo	President Félix Tshisekedi
Russia	President Vladimir Putin
Singapore	Prime Minister Lee Hsien Loong
Turkey	President Recep Tayyip Erdoğan
Vietnam	General Secretary Nguyễn Phú Trọng

== Results ==
At the summit Biden announced that greenhouse gas emissions by the United States would be reduced by 50% - 52% relative to the level of 2005 by 2030. Overall, the commitments made at the summit reduce the gap between governments' current pledges and the 1.5 degrees target of the Paris Agreement by 12% - 14%. If the pledges are accomplished, greenhouse gas emissions will fall by 2.6% - 3.7% GtCO2e more in comparison to the pledges before the summit. The results of the summit were described by Climate Action Tracker as a step forward in the fight against climate change, even though there is still a long way to go to reach the 1.5 degrees target. The most important commitments were made by United States, United Kingdom, European Union, China and Japan. At the summit the Biden administration submitted a new Nationally Determined Contribution to the United Nations Framework Convention on Climate Change (UNFCCC), according to Climate Action Tracker "the biggest climate step made by any US government in history".

At the summit Biden's administration launched a number of coalitions and initiatives to limit climate change and help to reduce its impacts, among others a Global Climate Ambition Initiative to help low income countries achieve those targets, and a "Net-Zero Producers Forum, with Canada, Norway, Qatar, and Saudi Arabia, together representing 40% of global oil and gas production"

Several countries increased their climate pledges in the summit. Several countries deliver vague promises, and statements:

Main commitments and statements made in the summit
Country	Commitments/Statements
United States	Pledged to reduce its emissions by 50% - 52% by 2030 relative to the level of 2005.
Brazil	Pledged to end deforestation by 2030 and achieving carbon neutrality by 2050. Presented an action plan to "move quickly towards reversing deforestation," in 12 months if necessary resources will be given
Japan	Pledged to reduce emissions by 46% by 2030 compared to the level of 2013 (instead of 26% before) and achieve net - zero emissions by 2050.
Canada	Pledged to reduce emissions by 40% - 45% by 2030 relative to the level of 2005 (instead of 30% before).
India	Reaffirmed its previous target of installing 450 gigawatts of renewable energy by 2030. With the United States created an "India-U.S. Climate and Clean Energy Agenda Partnership for 2030".
Russia	Pledged to reduce significantly its emissions in the next 3 decades, called for a global reduction in methane emissions.
China	Reaffirmed its pledges to peak its emissions by 2030 and reach carbon neutrality by 2060. Agreed to cooperate with the US in climate issues. Pledged to strictly control its coal burning by 2025 and reduce it from 2026.
South Korea	Pledged to stop financing coal related projects abroad.
United Kingdom	Pledged to reduce emissions by 78% by 2035
European Union	Announced the embedment in law of a target of reducing emissions by at least 55% by 2030 and by 100% by 2050

In the beginning of May, 2021, Climate Action Tracker released a more detailed report about the significance of the summit. According to the report the summit, together with the pledges made from September 2020, reduce the expected rise in temperature by 2100 by 0.2 degrees. If all pledges are fulfilled the temperature will rise by 2.4 °C. However, if the policies will remain as they are now it will rise by 2.9 °C. In the most optimistic scenario, if the countries will fulfill also the pledges that are not part of Paris agreement it will rise by 2.0 °C.

== Use of masks ==
After the summit, there were claims spread that Joe Biden was the only leader there wearing a mask, which was later proved was wrong as at least 5 other world leaders were wearing masks.
