= The Skin of Our Teeth =

1942 play by Thornton Wilder

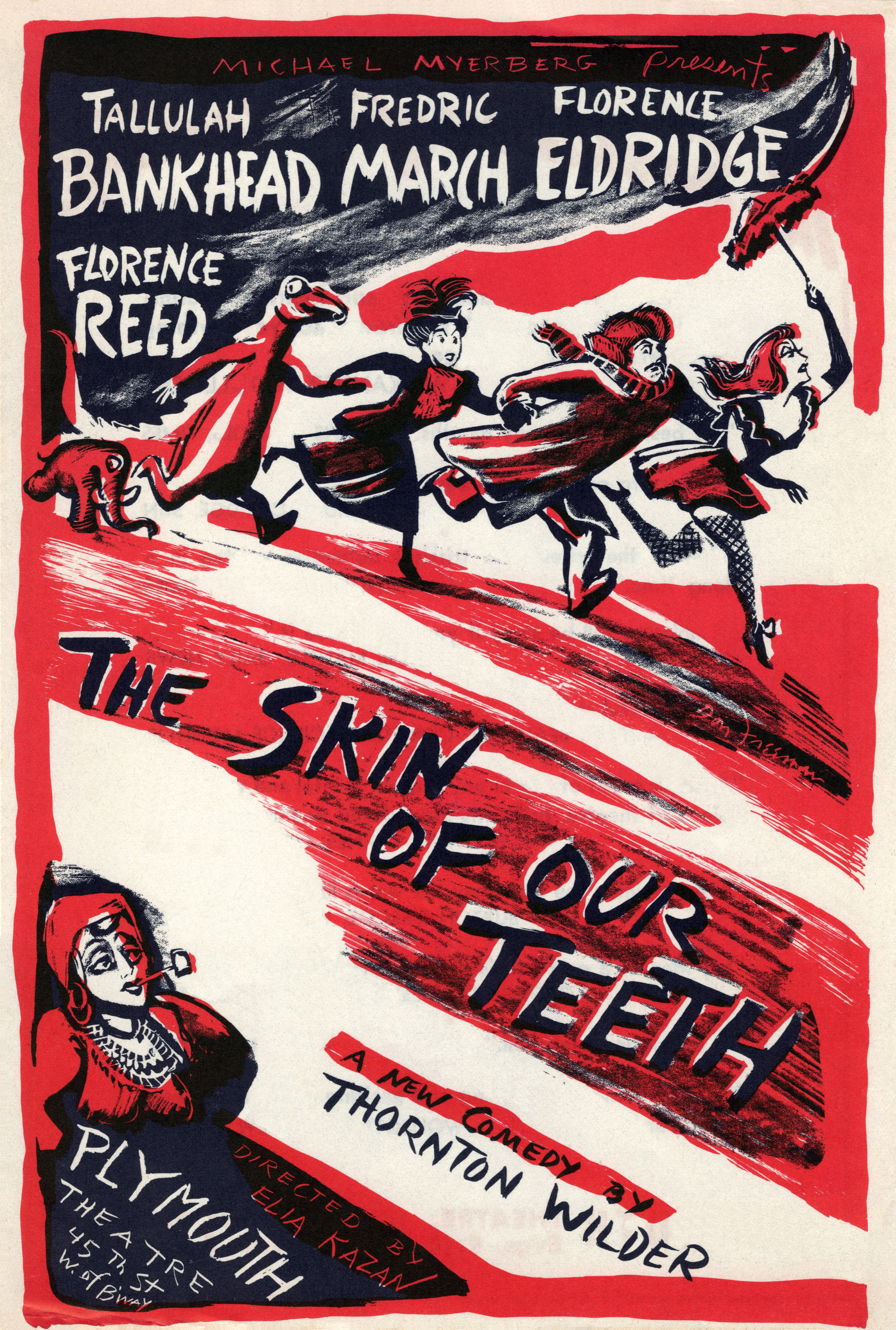
- Handbill for the 1942 Broadway production. Artwork by Don Freeman.
- Original language: English
- Written by: Thornton Wilder
- Characters: Sabina; Mrs. Antrobus; Mr. Antrobus; Gladys; Telegraph Boy; Dinosaur; Chair Pusher; Henry; Woolly Mammoth
- Genre: Comedy
- Setting: The Antrobus home in Excelsior, New Jersey; the Atlantic City boardwalk

Premiere
- Date: October 15, 1942
- Place: Shubert Theatre; New Haven, Connecticut

The Skin of Our Teeth is a play by Thornton Wilder that won the Pulitzer Prize for Drama. It opened on October 15, 1942, at the Shubert Theatre in New Haven, Connecticut, before moving to the Plymouth Theatre on Broadway on November 18, 1942. It was produced by Michael Myerberg and directed by Elia Kazan with costumes by Mary Percy Schenck. The play is a three-part allegory about the life of mankind, centering on the Antrobus family of the fictional town of Excelsior, New Jersey. The epic comedy-drama is noted as among the most heterodox of classic American comedies, as it breaks nearly every established convention of theatrical performances that was in effect when Wilder wrote it.

The phrase used as the title comes from the King James Bible, Job 19:20: "My bone cleaveth to my skin and to my flesh, and I am escaped with the skin of my teeth."

== Overview ==
The main characters of the play are George and Maggie Antrobus (from Greek: άνθρωπος (anthropos), "human" or "person"), their two children, Henry and Gladys, and Sabina, who appears as the family's maid in the first and third acts, and as a beauty queen temptress in the second act. The play's action takes place in a modern setting, but is full of anachronisms reaching back to prehistoric times. The characters' roles as archetypes are emphasized by their identification with Biblical and classical personalities:

The name Lilly Sabina is a reference to the myth of Lilith and to the historical rape of the Sabine women, identifications made relatively explicit in the play's text. Henry Antrobus's name was changed from "Cain", following his murder of his brother Abel, mirroring the biblical story in which Adam's son murders his brother after God favors Abel over Cain by gifts. This implies that George Antrobus is Adam and Maggie Antrobus Eve, supported when George composes a song for his wife Maggie in honor of their anniversary: "Happy w'dding ann'vers'ry dear Eva."

The murder of Abel is an underlying theme in the play. Mr. Antrobus pays far more attention to his "perfect" third child Gladys than he does Henry. As this treatment of Henry continues, Henry's anger progresses throughout the play, reaching its climax in the third act.

While the Antrobus family remains constant throughout the play, the three acts do not form a continuous narrative. The first act takes place during an impending ice age; in the second act the family circumstances have changed as George becomes president of the Fraternal Order of Mammals (apparent references to Sodom and Gomorrah but also to the Roaring Twenties), while the end of the world approaches a second time; the third act opens with Maggie and Gladys emerging from a bunker at the end of a seven-year-long war.

An additional layer of stylistic complexity is added by the occasional interruption of the recitative narrative scene by actors directly addressing the audience: In the first scene, the actress playing Sabina reveals her misgivings to the audience about the play; in the second act, she refuses to recite her lines and instead talks to the spectators, which causes a woman in the audience to run from the theater sobbing; and in the third act, the actor playing Mr. Antrobus interrupts to announce that several actors have taken ill and asks the audience to indulge them while the "stage manager" of the play conducts a rehearsal with the replacements.

== Plot ==
=== Act I ===
Act I is an amalgam of early 20th century New Jersey and the dawn of the Ice Age. The father is inventing things such as the lever, the wheel, the alphabet, and multiplication tables. The family and the entire Northeastern U.S. face extinction by a wall of ice moving southward from Canada. The story is introduced by a narrator and further expanded by the family maid, Sabina. There are unsettling parallels between the members of the Antrobus family and various characters from the Bible. In addition, time is compressed and scrambled to such an extent that the refugees who arrive at the Antrobus house seeking food and fire include the Old Testament prophet Moses, the ancient Greek poet Homer, and women who are identified as Muses.

=== Act II ===
Act II takes place on the Boardwalk at Atlantic City, New Jersey, where the Antrobuses are present for George's swearing-in as president of the Ancient and Honorable Order of Mammals, Subdivision Humans. Sabina is present, also, in the guise of a scheming beauty queen, who tries to steal George's affection from his wife and family. The conventioneers are rowdy and party furiously, but there is an undercurrent of foreboding, as a fortune teller warns of an impending storm. The weather soon transforms from summery sunshine to hurricane to deluge. Gladys and Henry attempt their individual rebellions and are brought back into line by the family. The act ends with the family members reconciled and, paralleling the biblical story of Noah's Ark, directing pairs of animals to safety on a large boat, where they survive the storm and the end of the world.

=== Act III ===
Act III takes place in the ruins of the Antrobuses' former home. A devastating war has occurred; Maggie and Gladys have survived by hiding in a cellar. When they come out of the cellar, Gladys is seen to have a baby. Sabina joins them and is "dressed as a Napoleonic camp-follower." George has been away at the front lines leading an army. Henry also fought, on the opposite side, and returns as a general. The family members discuss the ability of the human race to rebuild and continue after continually destroying itself. The question is raised: "Is there any accomplishment or attribute of the human race of enough value that its civilization should be rebuilt?"

The stage manager interrupts the play-within-the-play to explain that several members of their company cannot perform their parts, possibly from food poisoning (as the actress playing Sabina saw blue mold on the lemon meringue pie at dinner). The stage manager drafts a janitor, a dresser, and other non-actors to fill their parts, which involve quoting philosophers such as Plato and Aristotle to mark the passing of time within the play.

The alternate history action ends where it began, with Sabina dusting the living room and worrying about George's arrival from the office. Her final acts are to address the audience and to turn over the responsibility of continuing the action, or life, to them.

== Influences and criticism ==
Similarities between the play and James Joyce's novel Finnegans Wake (1939) have been noted — such as a family that represents the totality of humanity, cyclical storytelling, and copious Biblical allusions. One such comparison was published in the Saturday Review during the play's run on Broadway. Norman Cousins, editor of the Review, printed a short article by Joseph Campbell and Henry Morton Robinson titled "The Skin of Whose Teeth? The Strange Case of Mr. Wilder's New Play and Finnegans Wake" in the issue for December 19, 1942, with a second part in the February 13, 1943, issue.

In Campbell's book Pathways to Bliss, Campbell recalls his reaction to the similarities he noted between Wilder's play and Joyce's novel:

[W]hen I went to see Thornton Wilder's The Skin of Our Teeth, which was the big Broadway hit at the time...all I heard was Finnegans Wake. [...] I phoned Robinson, and I said, "Good God, here's Wilder making tons of money and a lot of fame on this thing, and it's simply Finnegans Wake." Joyce had just died, and his family was destitute. So I said, "I think we should write a letter to the New York Times."

Campbell claimed to have compared Finnegans Wake and the book form of The Skin of Our Teeth and found "nearly two hundred and fifty analogues—characters, themes, and finally a four-line, word-for-word quote."

The fact is that Wilder was one of Finnegans Wake's early champions — Wilder wrote to Gertrude Stein and Alice Toklas in August 1939, a few months after the book's publication, that "One of my absorptions [...] has been James Joyce's new novel, digging out its buried keys and resolving that unbroken chain of erudite puzzles."

Campbell and Robinson's reviews-cum-denunciations created a huge uproar at the time. The New Yorker magazine's Wolcott Gibbs satirized Campbell and Robinson's accusations in a December 26, 1942, piece called "Finnegan's Teeth."

== Notable productions ==
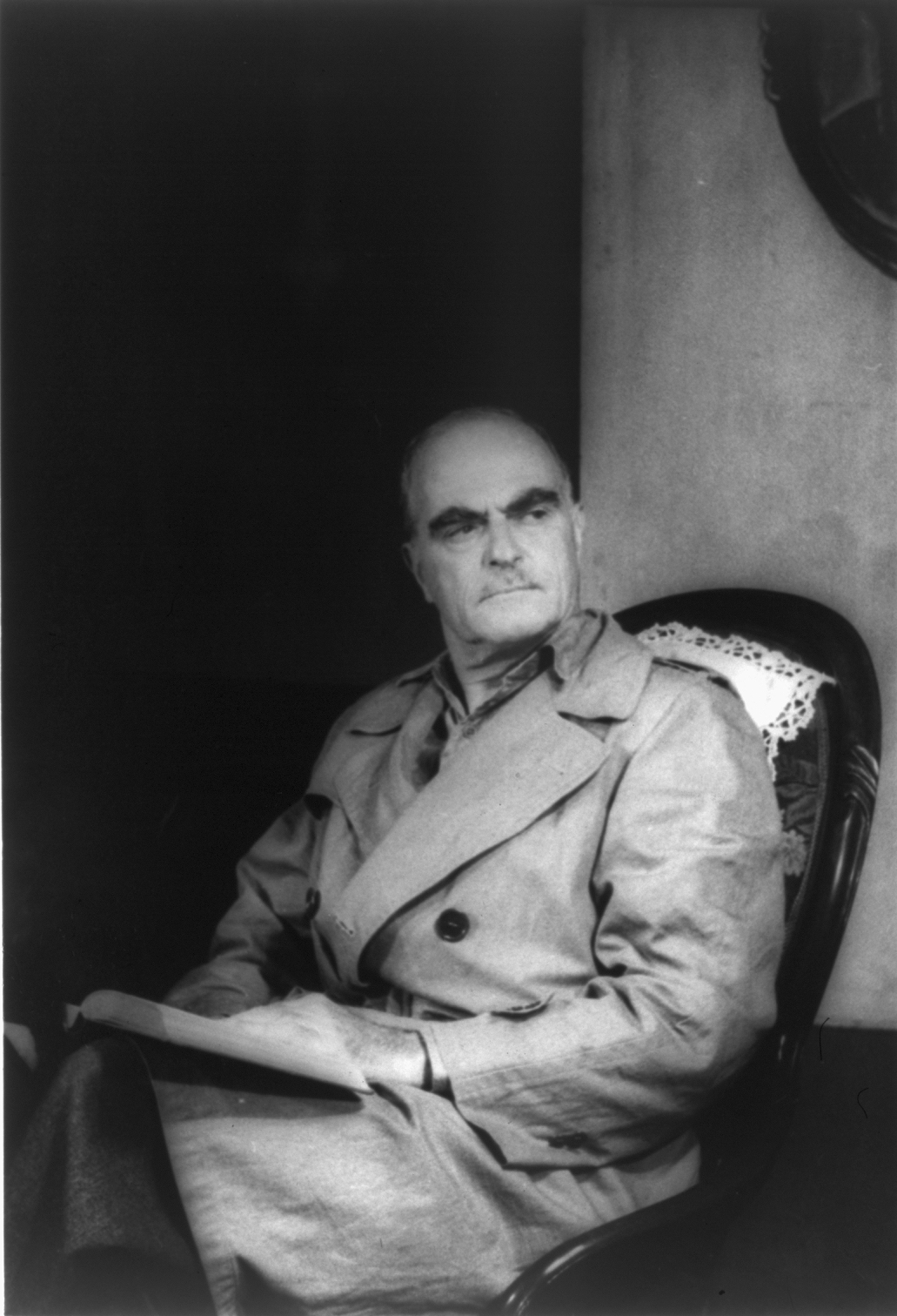
Wilder as Mr. Antrobus in 1948

The original production starred Tallulah Bankhead, Fredric March, Florence Eldridge, and Montgomery Clift. Bankhead won a Variety Award for Best Actress and the New York Drama Critics Award for Best Actress of the Year for her role as Sabina. When she left the production in March 1943, she was replaced by Miriam Hopkins. Hopkins was in turn replaced by Gladys George. For two performances, while George was ill, Lizabeth Scott, who had been Bankhead's understudy, was called in to play the role. Scott then played the role for the production's run in Boston. Originally billed in New York as "Elizabeth Scott", she dropped the "E" before taking the part in Boston, and it became her breakthrough role.

Following a pre-London tryout tour of the UK, the play had its London premiere at the Phoenix Theatre on 16 May 1945, where it ran for 77 performances, closing 21 July 1945. It re-opened in London at the Piccadilly Theatre on 11 September 1946, running there for a further 109 performances, until 14 December. Directed by Laurence Olivier, Sabina was played by Vivien Leigh, with Cecil Parker as George Antrobus (George Devine at the Piccadilly). The Oliviers also included the production on their Old Vic tour of Australia and New Zealand in 1948. Leigh revived the role in a 1959 television production filmed live by Granada Television, also starring George Devine as Mr. Antrobus and Ruth Dunning as Mrs. Antrobus.

The play was revived on Broadway in 1955, premiering at the ANTA Theatre. It was staged by the Edinburgh Gateway Company in 1961.

In 1983, American Playhouse, on PBS, aired a production that was produced at the Old Globe Theatre in San Diego. It starred Blair Brown, Harold Gould, Sada Thompson, Rue McClanahan and Jeffrey Combs, and was directed by Jack O'Brien.

New York City's Public Theater presented a production as part of its 1998 summer Shakespeare in the Park festival at the Delacorte Theater in Central Park. That production starred Kristen Johnston, John Goodman and Frances Conroy. It was directed by Irene Lewis.

In 2017, Theatre for a New Audience performed The Skin of Our Teeth directed by Arin Arbus. It won the 2017 Obie Award for Directing and Performance by Kecia Lewis.

A Broadway revival of the play directed by Lileana Blain-Cruz premiered at the Vivian Beaumont Theater in previews on April 1, 2022, and officially on April 25. It was subsequently nominated for six Tony Awards including Best Direction, Best Lead Actress, Best Costume Design, Best Lighting Design, Best Sound Design, and Best Set Design.

== Cast list ==
| Character | Original Broadway Cast 1942 | Old Globe Theatre, San Diego 1983 | Public Theatre, New York 1998 | Vivian Beaumont Broadway revival 2022 |
|---|---|---|---|---|
| Mr. Antrobus | Fredric March | Harold Gould | John Goodman | James Vincent Meredith |
| Mrs. Antrobus | Florence Eldridge | Sada Thompson | Frances Conroy | Roslyn Ruff |
| Henry | Montgomery Clift | Jeffrey Combs | John Ortiz | Julian Robertson |
| Gladys | Frances Heflin | Monique Fowler | Brienin Bryant | Paige Gilbert |
| Sabina | Tallulah Bankhead | Blair Brown | Kristen Johnston | Gabby Beans |
| Mr. Fitzpatrick | E.G. Marshall | Jonathan McMurty | —N/a | Donnetta Lavina Grays |

== Awards and nominations ==
=== 2022 Broadway revival ===
| Year | Award | Category | Nominated work | Result |
|---|---|---|---|---|
| 2022 | Tony Awards | Best Actress in a Play | Gabby Beans | Nominated |
| 2022 | Tony Awards | Best Direction of a Play | Lileana Blain-Cruz | Nominated |
| 2022 | Tony Awards | Best Scenic Design of a Play | Adam Rigg | Nominated |
| 2022 | Tony Awards | Best Costume Design of a Play | Montana Levi Blanco | Won |
| 2022 | Tony Awards | Best Lighting of a Play | Yi Zhao | Nominated |
| 2022 | Tony Awards | Best Sound Design of a Play | Palmer Hefferan | Nominated |

== Musical adaptations ==
There have been multiple attempts to work with Wilder or his literary executors to adapt the play into a musical.

Leonard Bernstein, Betty Comden, and Adolph Green collaborated on a version in the 1960s that they tentatively titled Help! Help! Hooray!, which Jerome Robbins was attached to at one point. There was never a production of this version, but Bernstein later reused the song “Spring Will Come Again” for Chichester Psalms.

John Kander and Fred Ebb collaborated with Joseph Stein on another adaptation that went through many titles during its development. In 1999, Over and Over premiered at Signature Theater with Sherie Rene Scott starring as Sabina after Bebe Neuwirth departed the production abruptly. Over and Over was later reworked as All About Us, which was almost completed when Ebb passed away in 2004. All About Us was produced at the Westport Country Playhouse in 2007. This production was notable at the time because it featured one of the final public performances of Eartha Kitt in the role of the Fortune Teller, and Wilder himself had played Antrobus in a 1948 production of the play at that venue. The Wilder estate withdrew the writing team’s permission for the source material in 2007.

In the 2010s, the Wilder estate approved a new adaptation by Ethan Lipton after Thornton Wilder’s nephew Tappan Wilder saw Lipton’s play Red-Handed Otter in Chicago and believed the playwright could be trusted with the material. Lipton’s adaptation, for which he wrote the book, music, and lyrics, was called The Seat of Our Pants. The musical opened at The Public Theater in November 2025 starring Ruthie Ann Miles, Shuler Hensley, Micaela Diamond, Damon Daunno, and Amina Faye. This adaptation was the first musical adaptation of the play to be produced in New York City. The production received two 2026 Lucille Lortel Award nominations, for Miles’s performance as Mrs. Antrobus and Kaye Voyce's costume design.
