= Noel (film) =

2004 drama film by Chazz Palminteri

- Film poster
- Directed by: Chazz Palminteri
- Written by: David Hubbard
- Produced by: Al Corley; Howard Rosenman
- Starring: Penélope Cruz; Susan Sarandon; Paul Walker; Alan Arkin; Marcus Thomas
- Cinematography: Russell Carpenter
- Edited by: Susan E. Morse
- Music by: Alan Menken
- Distributed by: Convex Group
- Release date: September 12, 2004
- Running time: 96 minutes
- Country: United States
- Language: English
- Box office: $2.2 million

Noel is a 2004 American Christmas-themed drama film written by David Hubbard and directed by Chazz Palminteri. It stars Penélope Cruz, Susan Sarandon, Paul Walker, Alan Arkin, Daniel Sunjata and an uncredited Robin Williams. The film focuses on intersecting storylines taking place on Christmas Eve in New York City. It was filmed partly in Montreal, Quebec, Canada.

== Plot ==
On Christmas Eve in New York, divorced publisher Rose Collins struggles to cope with caring for her mother, an Alzheimer's patient. As she contemplates suicide on a riverbank, former priest Charlie Boyd saves her life, and they spend the night together in her apartment. Although Charlie explains that he has lost faith in God, he tells Rose the following morning that his faith has been restored by a telepathic conversation with Rose's mother, who claims that she wants Rose to move on with her life. Rose angrily ejects Charlie from her apartment.

Young couple Nina Vasquez and Mike Riley are on the verge of breaking up due to Mike's increasingly jealous behavior. When Mike attacks a platonic friend of Nina's, she leaves him. She goes to her family to celebrate Christmas, where she meets Rose, who, through a series of events, has found herself in Nina's parents' house, and confides her story to her. Feeling out of place, Rose and Nina go to a nearby bar.

Elderly waiter Artie Venizelos searches for his deceased wife every Christmas. He makes sexual advances on Mike, believing him to be his deceased wife's reincarnation. When Artie collapses and is hospitalized, Mike learns from a colleague that Artie committed manslaughter in a fit of jealousy. As a result, his wife killed herself in a car accident. Mike sees this as a fateful sign that he must overcome his own pathological jealousy.

Jules Calvert is a depressed young man whose sole happy memory is a Christmas celebration in a hospital when he was a teenager. Seeking to repeat the experience, he allows the criminal Arizona to break his hand, but he soon learns that he cannot relive the past.

Rose, feeling guilty for her treatment of Charlie, returns to the hospital. She discovers that Charlie has been in a coma for some time and that no one comes to visit him. Across the hall, Rose's mother has finally been eating, thanks to Dr. Baron, with whom Rose agrees to dine.

== Cast ==
- Susan Sarandon as Rose Collins
- Penélope Cruz as Nina Vasquez
- Paul Walker as Michael "Mike" Riley
- Alan Arkin as Artie Venizelos
- Marcus Thomas as Jules Calvert
- Chazz Palminteri as Arizona
- Robin Williams as Charles "Charlie" Boyd (uncredited)
- Sonny Marinelli as Dennis
- Daniel Sunjata as Marco
- Rob Daly as Paul
- John Doman as Dr. Baron
- Billy Porter as Randy
- Carmen Ejogo as Dr. Batiste
- Donna Hanover as Debbie Carmichael
- Merwin Mondesir as Glenn

== Release ==
Noel premiered at the 2004 Toronto International Film Festival and was bought for distribution by Convex Group, owners of the Flexplay disposable DVD technology. Flexplay disks were DVDs designed to become unplayable 48 hours after being opened, envisaged as a way to do DVD rentals without the need to return the disk. Convex released Noel as a 'trimultaneous' release, releasing in cinemas, Flexplay disk, and airing on TNT within the same month. However, due to opposition from cinema chains about the lack of an exclusive theatrical window few cinemas showed the film.

Noel was in part marketed using Lidrock disks, another technology owned by Convex Group. These were CDs and DVDs that were embedded in the lids of soda cups.

== Reception ==
On review aggregate website Rotten Tomatoes, Noel has an approval score of 28%, based on 36 reviews, with an average rating of 4.4/10. The site's consensus reads: "Noel strains for holiday uplift, but -- despite the involvement of an outstanding ensemble cast -- settles for treacly sentiment instead."

Many critics' reviews criticized the film's elements of sentimentality, with Dave Kehr of The New York Times describing it as a "heap of platitudes".

In a review that awarded 2 stars out of 4, Roger Ebert of the Chicago Sun-Times wrote, "I can be sentimental under the right circumstances, but the movie is such a calculating tearjerker that it played like a challenge to me. There's a point at which the plot crosses an invisible line, becoming so preposterous that it's no longer moving and is just plain weird." He continued, "Some of the characters, like Sarandon's Rose, are convincing and poignant; others, like Arkin's lovesick waiter, are creepy, and [Thomas's Jules] should have tried the party at the Salvation Army, where they have great hot chocolate and sometimes you get a slice of pumpkin pie."

Rex Reed of The New York Observer wrote, "The movie's biggest problem is that it has no clear focus on what it wants to say. On one hand, it convinces its hapless characters they are part of a force beyond control that is playing chess with their fates. On the other hand, it suggests that in the midst of chaos, everything happens for a reason."

In a positive review, Ed Gonzales of Slant Magazine wrote that "the pieces of Palminteri's yuletide Short Cuts fit comfortably together. Though visually unexciting, Noel is warmhearted and manages to get considerable mileage out of a series of unpredictable and nutty spiritual flights of fancy." He added, "Maudlin maybe, but Noel doesn't so much ask to be believed as much as it asks for us to believe in its spirit of togetherness."

== See also ==
- List of Christmas films
