= The Harbinger (film) =

- Directed by: Andy Mitton
- Written by: Andy Mitton
- Produced by: Jay Dunn; Richard W. King; Andy Mitton
- Starring: Gabby Beans; Emily Davis; Raymond Anthony Thomas
- Cinematography: Ludovica Isidori
- Edited by: Andy Mitton
- Music by: Andy Mitton
- Production company: One Bad Idea Films
- Distributed by: XYZ Films
- Release dates: 20 July 2022 (Fantasia International Film Festival); 1 December 2022 (US)
- Running time: 86 minutes
- Country: United States
- Language: English

The Harbinger is a 2022 American horror film directed by Andy Mitton and starring Gabby Beans, Emily Davis, and Raymond Anthony Thomas.

== Cast ==
- Gabby Beans as Monique
- Emily Davis as Mavis
- Raymond Anthony Thomas as Ronald
- Myles Walker as Lyle
- Cody Braverman as Edward
- Jay Dunn as Jason
- Stephanie Roth Haberle as Crystal
- Laura Heisler as Wendy

== Plot summary ==
The movie follows Monique, who leaves her brother and father and her pandemic "bubble" to visit Mavis, a college friend who Monique promised to always be there for. Mavis is experiencing horrific nightmares. The nightmares are hyper-realistic and seemingly linked to a demonic entity called the Harbinger. Monique must confront her own fears and delve into the dreamscape to help Mavis and potentially save herself.

== Release ==
The film premiered at the Fantasia International Film Festival on 20 July 2022. The film was released in theatres on 1 December 2022.

== Reception ==
On review aggregator Rotten Tomatoes, The Harbinger holds an approval rating of 92%, based on 26 reviews, and an average rating of 7.60/10.

Nick Allen of RogerEbert.com wrote that the film is "more claustrophobic than your regular haunted house thriller, and the story does more than just use COVID as a familiar plot point, as it seeks to get underneath the feeling of trying to avoid it" and that Beans "gives an immersive and emotional performance". Dennis Harvey of Variety wrote that the film "disappoints only in that it's good enough to make you wish it were better — that it left an indelible impression rather than a slightly vague one", and that "atmospherically, it does a lot with little, never feeling claustrophobically confined by the very ordinary, even drab lockdown interiors", which are occasionally "broken up by snowy exteriors that are no more welcoming in Ludovica Isidori's adept cinematography." Mary Beth McAndrews of Dread Central rated the film 4.5 stars out of 5 and wrote that Mitton "illustrates how you can make a scary yet sensitive pandemic horror film that cuts to the core of the hell that has been the last two years." Joel Harley of Starburst rated the film 4 stars out of 5 and wrote that Mitton "uses his characters' loneliness and increased fragility as a springboard to tell a story about Corona and its continued impact" and called the film's main antagonist "instantly memorable"and "a modern Boogeyman for an age of lockdowns, surgical masks and raging pandemics." Joe Lipsett of Bloody Disgusting rated the film 3.5 skulls out of 5 and wrote that the film "excels at striking a balance between fantastical genre elements and topical real-world concerns."
