= That's Life (2000 TV series) =

- Genre: Comedy drama
- Created by: Diane Ruggiero
- Starring: Heather Paige Kent; Kristin Bauer; Peter Firth; Kevin Dillon; Danielle Harris; Debi Mazar; Paul Sorvino; Ellen Burstyn
- Composers: Jay Gruska; Danny Pelfrey
- Country of origin: United States
- Original language: English
- No. of series: 2
- No. of episodes: 36 (4 unaired)

Production
- Executive producers: Anita W. Addison; Maddy Horne; Lynn Marie Latham; Frank Renzulli
- Producers: Peter Dunne; W. Mark McNair; Peter Woronov
- Running time: 42 minutes
- Production companies: Film Noir Productions (Season 1); Paramount Network Television

Original release
- Network: CBS
- Release: October 1, 2000 – January 26, 2002

That's Life is an American comedy-drama television series created by Diane Ruggiero, that was broadcast on CBS from October 1, 2000 to January 26, 2002.

== Synopsis ==
The hour-long series follows the life of a young Italian-American woman (Lydia DeLucca, played by Heather Paige Kent), loosely based on Ms. Ruggiero's life, and her family in suburban New Jersey. The show was set in fictional Bellefield, ostensibly a play on the combination of Belleville and Bloomfield, two adjacent older working class suburbs on the north side of Newark, New Jersey.

In the first season, Frank DeLucca works as a toll collector on the New Jersey Turnpike, while Dolly is a housewife. In the second season, Frank retires after suffering a heart attack on the job, and he and Dolly open a restaurant. Kevin Dillon played Paulie, Lydia's younger brother who was a young officer on the Bellefield Police Department who still lived at home. Debi Mazar played Jackie, Lydia's wise-cracking friend who owned a hair salon. The show mixed family situations with situations focusing on Lydia's life as a young single woman looking for both love and stable career, and for more out of life than simply raising children.

The first season revolved around the fallout from Lydia's breaking off her engagement to Lou (Sonny Marinelli, who was written out after a few episodes), enrolling at Montville State University, a local university somewhat resembling nearby Montclair State University, and moving away from home for the first time. Most of the situations were light-hearted, but plots occasionally delved into darker subjects, including Paulie's struggle to resist the temptation to fall into corruption as a police officer. In the second season, Lydia finally selects a major to pursue a career in sports medicine. Her mother Dolly successfully ran for city council of Bellefield. Paulie started dating Plum (Danielle Harris), a classmate whom Lydia befriends in the first season, and marries her.

The show developed a small fan base and received generally positive critical response, but languished in the ratings, despite the presence of well-known names in its cast, in part because it aired during the Friday night death slot for much of its run. It was cancelled at the end of the second season with numerous unresolved plot lines, including the budding romance between Lydia and one of her professors.

== Cast ==
- Heather Paige Kent as Lydia DeLucca (Main cast: seasons 1-2)
- Ellen Burstyn as Dolly DeLucca (Main cast: seasons 1-2)
- Kristin Bauer as Candy Cooper (Main cast: season 1)
- Peter Firth as Victor Leski (Main cast: season 1, guest star: season 1)
- Kevin Dillon as Paulie DeLucca (Main cast: seasons 1-2)
- Sonny Marinelli as Lou Buttafucco
- Paul Sorvino as Frank DeLucca
- Debi Mazar as Jackie O'Grady
- Danielle Harris as Plum Wilkinson (later: DeLucca) (Recurring: season 1, Main cast: season 2)
- Titus Welliver as Eric Hackett (Main cast: season 2)

== Episodes ==
=== Season 1 (2000–01) ===
| No. overall | No. in season | Title | Directed by | Written by | Original release date | Prod. code |
|---|---|---|---|---|---|---|
| 1 | 1 | "Pilot" | Mick Jackson | Diane Ruggiero | October 1, 2000 | 40353–001 |
| 2 | 2 | "The Screw-Up" | Jim Frawley | Diane Ruggiero | October 7, 2000 | 40353–002 |
| 3 | 3 | "Whadda You Want from Life" | Unknown | Unknown | October 14, 2000 | 40353–003 |
| 4 | 4 | "He's Very Heavy, He's My Brother" | Rob Thompson | Story by : Anne McGrail; Teleplay by : Bill Grundfest & Diane Ruggiero | October 21, 2000 | 40353–005 |
| 5 | 5 | "Bad Hair Week" | Jack Bender + | Anne McGrail | October 28, 2000 | 40353–006 |
| 6 | 6 | "The Tell-Tale Uterus" | David Semel | Anne McGrail | November 4, 2000 | 40353–008 |
| 7 | 7 | "Lydia and the Professor" | Christopher Monger | Bill Grundfest | November 11, 2000 | 40353–007 |
| 8 | 8 | "The Tutor" | Unknown | Unknown | November 18, 2000 | 40353–010 |
| 9 | 9 | "Saint Bernadette" | Unknown | Unknown | November 25, 2000 | 40353–004 |
| 10 | 10 | "When Good Ideas Go Bad" | Unknown | Unknown | December 16, 2000 | 40353–012 |
| 11 | 11 | "Photographs" | Paul Sorvino | Diane Ruggiero | January 6, 2001 | 40353–009 |
| 12 | 12 | "Nomads" | Unknown | Unknown | January 13, 2001 | 40353–011 |
| 13 | 13 | "Heart Problems" | Unknown | Unknown | January 20, 2001 | 40353–013 |
| 14 | 14 | "Touched by a Biker" | Unknown | Unknown | February 3, 2001 | 40353–014 |
| 15 | 15 | "Mr. Wrong" | Unknown | Unknown | February 10, 2001 | 40353–015 |
| 16 | 16 | "Or What's a Heaven For?" | Unknown | Unknown | February 17, 2001 | 40353–016 |
| 17 | 17 | "Banister Head" | Unknown | Unknown | February 24, 2001 | 40353–017 |
| 18 | 18 | "Miracle at the Cucina" | Unknown | Unknown | March 10, 2001 | 40353–018 |
| 19 | 19 | "No Good Deed" | Unknown | Unknown | April 7, 2001 | 40353–019 |

=== Season 2 (2001–02) ===
| No. overall | No. in season | Title | Directed by | Written by | Original release date | Prod. code |
|---|---|---|---|---|---|---|
| 20 | 1 | "Larva" | Michael Switzer | Diane Ruggiero | September 28, 2001 | 40353–020 |
| 21 | 2 | "Something Battered, Something Blue" | Joanna Kerns | James Stanley | October 5, 2001 | 40353–021 |
| 22 | 3 | "The Devil and Miss DeLucca" | Michael Switzer | Anne McGrail | October 12, 2001 | 40353–022 |
| 23 | 4 | "M.Y.O.B." | Unknown | Unknown | October 19, 2001 | 40353–023 |
| 24 | 5 | "Bad Chemistry" | Unknown | Unknown | October 26, 2001 | 40353–024 |
| 25 | 6 | "Boo!" | Mark Jean | Bernard Lechowick | November 2, 2001 | 40353–025 |
| 26 | 7 | "Plus One" | Unknown | Unknown | November 9, 2001 | 40353–026 |
| 27 | 8 | "Idiots" | Unknown | Unknown | November 16, 2001 | 40353–027 |
| 28 | 9 | "Oh, Baby" | Unknown | Unknown | December 7, 2001 | 40353–028 |
| 29 | 10 | "Sex in the Suburbs" | Unknown | Unknown | December 21, 2001 | 40353–029 |
| 30 | 11 | "All About Lydia" | Unknown | Unknown | January 11, 2002 | 40353–030 |
| 31 | 12 | "What's Family Got to Do With It?" | Unknown | Unknown | January 12, 2002 | 40353–031 |
| 32 | 13 | "Momento" | Unknown | Unknown | January 26, 2002 | 40353–032 |
| 33 | 14 | "Behind Closed Doors" | TBD | TBD | UNAIRED | 40353–033 |
| 34 | 15 | "Love's Labor" | Paul Sorvino | Lynn Marie Latham & Anne McGrail | UNAIRED | 40353–034 |
| 35 | 16 | "Baum's Thesis" | TBD | TBD | UNAIRED | 40353–035 |
| 36 | 17 | "Gutterball" | TBD | TBD | UNAIRED | 40353–036 |

== TV ratings ==
- Highest rated: 12.1 million/9.1 household rating [series debut against Summer Olympics Closing Ceremony]
- 2000 to 2001:
- 2001 to 2002: 6.9 million viewers

== Awards and nominations ==
| Year | Award | Category | Recipient | Result |
|---|---|---|---|---|
| 2001 | Artios Award | Best Casting for TV, Dramatic Pilot | Mary V. Buck and Susan Edelman | Nominated |
| 2002 | Golden Reel Award | Best Sound Editing in Television – Music, Episodic Live Action | Lisa A. Arpino (for episode "Touched by a Biker") | Nominated |
