= Gabby Beans =

American actress, writer, and producer

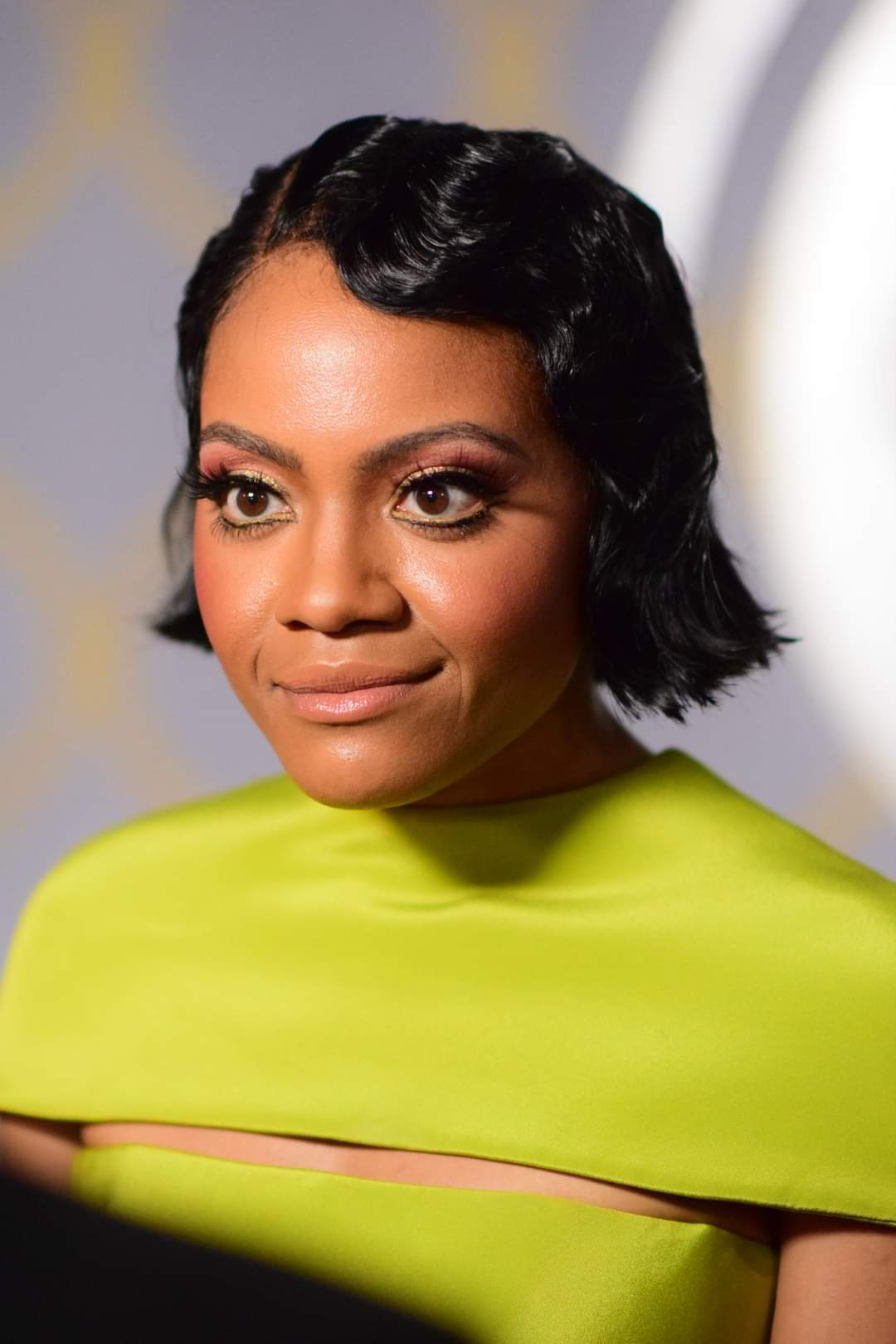
- Beans at the 75th Tony Awards in 2022
- Education: Columbia University (BA); London Academy of Music and Dramatic Art (MA)
- Occupations: actress, writer, producer

Gabby Beans is an American actress, writer, and producer. She studied acting at Columbia University and the London Academy of Music and Dramatic Art. She has received a Obie Award and a Lucille Lortel Award as well as a nomination for a Tony Award.

She made her Broadway debut acting in a revival of the Thornton Wilder play The Skin of Our Teeth (2022) for which she was nominated for the Tony Award for Best Actress in a Play. She returned to Broadway playing the dual role of Mercutio and Friar in a revival of William Shakespeare's romantic tragedy Romeo + Juliet (2024).

On screen, she made her feature film acting debut in the horror film The Harbinger (2022), followed by supporting roles in Honey Don't! (2025) and Steven Spielberg's Disclosure Day (2026).

== Early life and education ==
Beans received her BA from Columbia University as a double major in neuroscience and theatre. She received her MA in Classical Acting from the London Academy of Music and Dramatic Art.

== Career ==
She made her Broadway debut playing Sabina the maid in the revival of the Thorton Wilder play The Skin of Our Teeth at the Vivian Beaumont Theater in Lincoln Center. Greg Evans of Deadline Hollywood described her performance as "terrifically funny especially when breaking character to reveal yet another character beneath". For her performance she received a nomination for the Tony Award for Best Actress in a Play. She also made brief appearances in TV shows such as the HBO comedy-drama series Succession, the Netflix political drama series House of Cards, and the Showtime series Ray Donovan. She played Ana in the Roundabout Theatre Company's production of Jonah by Rachel Bond at the Laura Pels Theatre. For her performance she was nominated for the Drama League Award for Distinguished Performance. Adam Feldman of Time Out praised her performance writing, "[Beans] delivers another charismatic and varied star turn. Even when the play is just okay, she shines." In 2024, she was cast in the comedy film, Honey Don't! directed by Ethan Coen, which was released in 2025.

== Acting credits ==
=== Film ===
| Year | Title | Role | Notes | Ref. |
|---|---|---|---|---|
| 2022 | The Harbinger | Monique | Feature film debut | |
| 2023 | Our Son | Judith | | |
| 2024 | Rob Peace | Darlene | | |
| 2024 | Turning | Arlo | | |
| 2025 | Honey Don't! | Spider | | |
| 2026 | Disclosure Day | Angela Childs | | |
| TBA | The Chaperones | TBD | Post-production | |

=== Television ===
| Year | Title | Role | Notes |
|---|---|---|---|
| 2016 | I Loved You...But I Lied | Jessica | Episode: "Heart" |
| 2018 | House of Cards | Private Jenna Burton | Episode: "Chapter 66" |
| 2018 | Ray Donovan | Cara Harris | Episode: "Baby" |
| 2021 | The Good Fight | Camille | Episode: "And the Fight Had a Détente..." |
| 2021 | Succession | Lia | Episode: "Mass in Time of War" |
| 2021, 2023 | Blue Bloods | Cora Felton | Episodes: "Firewall", "Close to Home" |
| 2024 | Presumed Innocent | Mya Winslow | 8 episodes |
| 2025 | Your Friends & Neighbors | Dr. Evelyn Ellis | Episode: "Literal Dragons" |

=== Theatre ===
| Year | Title | Role | Venue | Ref. |
|---|---|---|---|---|
| 2019 | Marys Seacole | Mamie | The Claire Tow Theatre, Lincoln Center | |
| 2020 | Anatomy of a Suicide | Bonnie | Linda Gross Theatre, Atlantic Theatre Company | |
| 2022 | The Skin of Our Teeth | Sabina | Vivian Beaumont Theatre, Broadway | |
| 2022 | I'm Revolting | Anna | Linda Gross Theatre, Atlantic Theatre Company | |
| 2024 | Jonah | Ana | Laura Pels Theatre, Roundabout Theatre Company | |
| 2024 | Romeo + Juliet | Mercutio / Friar | Circle in the Square Theatre, Broadway | |

== Awards and nominations ==
| Year | Award | Category | Work | Result | Ref. |
|---|---|---|---|---|---|
| 2022 | Drama League Award | Distinguished Performance | The Skin of Our Teeth | Nominated | |
| 2022 | Tony Awards | Best Actress in a Play | The Skin of Our Teeth | Nominated | |
| 2024 | Drama League Award | Distinguished Performance | Jonah | Nominated | |
| 2024 | Lucille Lortel Award | Outstanding Lead Performer in a Play | Jonah | Won | |
| 2025 | Obie Award | Distinguished Performance | Jonah | Won | |
