= Anessa Ramsey =

American actress and film producer (born 1978)

- Born: January 1978 (age 48); United States
- Occupations: Actress, film producer

Anessa Ramsey is an American actress and film producer. Ramsey starred in The Signal (2007), YellowBrickRoad (2010), and Rites of Spring (2011).

== Career ==
Heather Wixson of Dread Central called her "one of the finest actresses working in independent film these days". Ramsey began acting at 17. Her first starring role was in The Signal with Justin Welborn and A. J. Bowen. The three had worked extensively with co-directors David Bruckner, Jacob Gentry, and Dan Bush in Atlanta-based productions previously. Her next starring role was in YellowBrickRoad. The directors, Jesse Holland and Andy Mitton, were fans of The Signal and cast Ramsey based on her performance in that film. Ramsey was offered the option of co-producing the film, which she said that she enjoyed. She said that she was drawn to the film based on the setting. In Rites of Spring, she starred as a flawed heroine, which she said was an important part of the characterization for her. She was also interested in appearing in a creature feature. Ramsey performed her own stunts. John Anderson of Variety wrote that Rites of Spring "has a terrific actress in Anessa Ramsey, who's that rare thing in horror, a thoroughly-convincing victim." In 2013, she appeared in a small role in Devil's Knot, and, in 2015, she appeared in the horror anthology Southbound. In 2017, she starred in Roger Corman's Death Race 2050 as Tammy the Terrorist.

== Filmography ==
Film and television
Year	Title	Role	Notes
1998	M.S.G.	Stitch	Short
2004	Darkest Adversary	Fallen Angel	Short
2007	The Signal	Mya Denton	
2007	Why I Love Shoplifting from Big Corporations	Strange Man / Mommy	Short
2008	Golgotha	Golgotha	
2009	Hungry for Love	Rhoda (age 22)	Short
2009	7 Days of Yellow	Blair	
2010	YellowBrickRoad	Melissa Barnes	
2010	The 5th Quarter	Lynn Garber	
2011	Footloose	Caroline	
2011	Rites of Spring	Rachel Adams	
2012	Ghost of Old Highways	The Whore	Short
2013	Devil's Knot	Rosie	
2015	Night Light VR	Mother	Short
2015	Southbound	Bunny Kensington	
2015	Criminal Minds	Christine McNeil	"Mr. Scratch"
2017	Death Race 2050	Tammy	
