= Andy Mitton =

American film director

- Occupation: movie director
- Years active: 2010–present
- Website: andymitton.com

Andy Mitton is an American horror film director. He directed We Go On (2016), The Witch in the Window (2018) and The Harbinger (2022). He also co-directed YellowBrickRoad (2010).
