= All About Us (musical) =

- Promotional art from 1999 production
- Music: John Kander
- Lyrics: Fred Ebb
- Book: Joseph Stein
- Basis: Thornton Wilder's play The Skin of Our Teeth
- Productions: 1999 Arlington, Virginia; 2006 New York City reading 2007 Westport, Connecticut

All About Us is a musical with a book by Joseph Stein, lyrics by Fred Ebb, and music by John Kander. The musical has been produced in regional theatres but not in New York City.

Based on Thornton Wilder's Pulitzer Prize-winning classic comedy The Skin of Our Teeth, the prehistoric Antrobus family and their maid deal with life's trials and tribulations, including the Ice Age, a great flood, and a devastating war as they traverse the centuries in a testament to human will and resilience.

== Synopsis ==
Mr. Antrobus, head of the First Family of Man, his wife Maggie, their son Henry, daughter Gladys and their attractive maid, Sabina, face the hardships of the prehistoric time, and the impending Ice Age. The Woolly Mammoths attend the Mammoth Convention in Atlantic City. Sabina enters the beauty contest at the convention ("World Peace"). The Fortune Teller Esmeralda predicts the coming doom ("Rain"). As the actors break the actors' fourth-wall by speaking directly to the audience, the frustrated stage manager tries to keep the show together ("Who's the Equity Deputy on this show?"). Finally a world war breaks out and Henry, the leader of the opposition, confronts his father, while in the end, Sabina goes to the movies during a break in the raging catastrophe ("At the Rialto").

== Songs (2007) ==
- "Eat The Ice Cream"
- "Sabina!"
- "A Telegram"
- "We're Home"
- "The Wheel"
- "Warm"
- "A Whole Lot Of Lovin'!"
- "When Poppa Comes Home"
- "Save The Human Race"
- "A Discussion"
- "Rain"
- "Beauty Pageant"
- "World Peace"
- "He Always Comes To Me"
- "You Owe It To Yourself"
- "Nice People"
- "The Promise"
- "Military Man"
- "Lullaby"
- "Another Telegram"
- "The Skin Of Our Teeth"
- "At The Rialto"

== Productions and background ==
Several readings and workshops were held, including in summer 1996 with Debra Monk, James Naughton and Bernadette Peters; and in June 1998 with Monk and David Garrison as Mr. and Mrs. Antrobus, Michele Pawk as Sabina and Carol Woods as the fortune teller.

Originally titled Over and Over, the musical premiered in January and February 1999 at the Signature Theatre in Arlington, Virginia. The cast featured Dorothy Loudon as LuLu Shriner, David Garrison, Mario Cantone and Linda Emond as Mrs. Antrobus. Sherie Rene Scott replaced Bebe Neuwirth shortly before the opening in the role of Sabina. That role had been done by Bernadette Peters at a first reading. Chip Crews, feature writer for The Washington Post observed: "It's a little hard to imagine Neuwirth as Sabina. Remember, for that first reading, the team used Bernadette Peters in the role, and Kander says she was terrific. There may be parts in which both actresses would score, but not many."

Critical reception was lukewarm, and the creative team reworked it in a number of workshop productions, at one point reverting to Wilder's original title, but never felt it was ready for Broadway. Following Ebb's death in 2004, the project was abandoned.

According to writer Joseph Stein, the production at the Signature Theatre "...just didn't work properly...I made a lot of changes, and the third act of the play practically doesn't exist in the musical. Basically, the line of the play, we have kept. And the three major characters we have kept intact. We made the changes that will improve it for a contemporary audience."

A reading of a revamped version, rechristened All About Us, was held on January 17, 2006, in New York City, with Eartha Kitt and Karen Ziemba among the participants. The Westport Country Playhouse presented a full staging directed by Gabriel Barre and choreographed by Christopher Gattelli, with Kitt as Esmeralda, Cady Huffman as Sabina, and Shuler Hensley as Mr. Antrobus from April 10 to 28, 2007.

== Critical reaction ==
In her review in The New York Times, Sylviane Gold praised Kitt, "Is there anything that can't be saved by Eartha Kitt? She's demonstrating that there is indeed a good reason for All About Us", but said of the show "[it] never achieves the critical mass that transforms a collection of discrete numbers into an all-embracing universe."

In his review for Variety, Frank Rizzo said that "A lot of work still has to be done," noting that "What seems most lacking is the kind of opener that might place the show in a wilder Wilder world, embracing the writer's deconstructionism and epic themes with joyous abandon. There's nothing here to prep the audience for the show's strange musical journey. One longs for a Kander and Ebb number that would pull it all together before setting things loose in the story's crazy, loving way. Similarly absent is a closing number that's more of a wow than a wink."

The theatre critic for TheaterMania.com, David Finkle, said in his review, "Kander is reportedly committed to having every show that he and his late songwriting partner completed brought to the stage. He was right to press for the recently opened and entertaining Broadway musical Curtains, but this time, the bigger favor would perhaps have been to keep the trunk lid firmly shut."
