= Rites of Spring (film) =

2011 horror film

- Directed by: Padraig Reynolds
- Screenplay by: Padraig Reynolds
- Produced by: Wes Benton; E. Thompson
- Starring: A. J. Bowen; Anessa Ramsey; Sonny Marinelli; Katherine Randolph; James Bartz; Shanna Forrestall; Hannah Bryan; Skylar Burke; Marco St. John
- Cinematography: Carl Herse
- Edited by: Aaron Peak
- Music by: Holly Amber Church
- Production companies: Red Planet Entertainment; White Rock Lake Productions; Vigilante Entertainment
- Distributed by: IFC Films
- Release date: October 22, 2011 (Screamfest)
- Running time: 80 minutes
- Country: United States
- Language: English

Rites of Spring is a 2011 American horror film written and directed by Padraig Reynolds. It stars A. J. Bowen, Sonny Marinelli, and Katherine Randolph as kidnappers who encounter an unrelated kidnapping victim (Anessa Ramsey), who is fleeing a monster.

== Plot ==
Rachel Adams and her friend Alyssa Miller work for Ryan Hayden. Rachel is responsible for losing an important client, but she allows Ben Geringer to take the fall. Feeling guilty, she goes out to drink with Alyssa and resolves to come clean. Before she can, she and Alyssa are kidnapped by a man known only as the Stranger. The Stranger takes them to his barn, where he strings them up and demands to know if they're clean. Confused and scared, the women do not know how to answer him; this only intensifies when he takes a blood sample from both women and gives it to a strange creature kept in a locked hole. The Stranger strips Alyssa naked, gives her a sponge bath, puts a goat mask on her head, and takes her away. Rachel frees herself, but she is too late to save Alyssa, who has been decapitated. Rachel assaults the Stranger, who warns her not to let the creature free, and flees the barn in a panic. Freed, the creature pursues her.

Meanwhile, Ben Geringer and his wife Amy have fallen on hard times, as Hayden has fired him. Ben recruits his wife, his brother Tommy, and his acquaintance Paul Nolan to ransom Hayden's daughter. Ben distrusts Paul, but Paul has an inside person that they need. The kidnapping goes off without any problems, but Paul deviates from the plan: he murders Hayden's wife and takes nanny Jessica hostage. When Tommy goes to collect the ransom money from Hayden, Hayden in turn takes Tommy hostage. Hayden forces Tommy to take him to the others and attempts to use Tommy as leverage to regain his daughter. However, when Hayden frees Jessica, she shoots him dead and reveals herself as Paul's accomplice. Paul and Jessica announce that they are taking all the money; Tommy protests, and Paul kills him. Before Paul can finish off Ben and Amy, Rachel bursts in and begs for help. At the same time, Hayden's daughter escapes through a window, never to be seen again.

The creature enters and kills Jessica. Paul takes Rachel hostage and attempts to leave with the money; however, the creature kills him and stalks Rachel. Amy suggests that she and Ben just leave, but Ben refuses to abandon Rachel. Amy reluctantly joins him, and they discover the Stranger's house. When they find his mementos and a wall covered in news clippings of missing women, they attempt to leave, but the Stranger captures them both and prepares them for the creature. Amy is taken away, but before the Stranger can prepare Ben for sacrifice, Rachel rescues him. Together, Ben and Rachel search for Amy, only to find her moments before the creature decapitates her. Ben tosses Rachel his car keys and demands that she flee. Rachel sets a trap for the creature, but she accidentally kills Ben instead. She gets in the car and drives off, where she stops at a gas station. Rachel begs for the store owner for help, but thinking she's insane, doesn't believe her and turns off the lights. Rachel finally makes a last stand in her car: she slices the creature with its own axe and leaves it for dead.

== Cast ==
- A. J. Bowen as Ben Geringer
- Anessa Ramsey as Rachel Adams
- Sonny Marinelli as Paul Nolan
- Katherine Randolph as Amy
- James Bartz as Ryan Hayden
- Shanna Forrestall as Gillian Hayden
- Andrew Breland as Tommy Geringer
- Hannah Bryan as Alyssa Miller
- Sarah Pachelli as Jessica
- Skylar Burke as Kelly Hayden
- Marco St. John as the Stranger
- Jeff Nations as Karmanor/Worm Face

== Production ==
Rites of Spring was written and directed by Padraig Reynolds. Development for the film began after Reynolds came up with the idea to combine a kidnapping film with a horror film, with his main influences for the film being Venom and The Black Windmill. The film was shot in 18 days across 14 different locations in Mississippi, each of which were close to each other. Reynolds planned to shoot a sequel that will answer many of the answers he left ambiguous in the first film. A. J. Bowen was shooting A Horrible Way to Die when he heard from Ti West that producer John Norris was looking to cast him in Rites of Spring. Bowen, who had recently made several artistic films, was looking to make something simpler and move beyond playing psychopaths. When Bowen discovered that Reynolds wanted to cast Anessa Ramsey, he called her himself, as he is friends with her. They had worked together previously on The Signal, and Bowen was excited about working with her again in a non-antagonistic role. The sets were all practical, and one set was a former Governor's mansion.

== Release ==
The film premiered at Screamfest in Hollywood, California on October 22, 2011. IFC Midnight released it on video-on-demand and gave it a limited theatrical run on July 27, 2012.

== Reception ==
Rotten Tomatoes, a review aggregator, reports that Rites of Spring received a rating of 11% based on nine surveyed critics; the average rating was 4.1/10. Metacritic gave the film a rating of 33/100 based on five reviews. Heather Wixson of Dread Central rated the film 2.5/5 stars and wrote that "the build-up in the film goes absolutely nowhere by the time the credits begin rolling". Scott Weinberg of Fearnet wrote that the film's tropes are not original, but that the fast pacing, freshness, and suspense make up for it. Noel Murray of The A.V. Club rated it C− and wrote that its "execution is rarely as inventive as its plotting." John DeFore of The Hollywood Reporter called it "a bottom-of-the-barrel slasher pic". Andy Webster of The New York Times wrote that the film is derivative but "a mildly novel juxtaposition of narratives." John Anderson of Variety called it a "genuinely gripping" film that will appeal to hardcore horror fans. Nick Schlager of Time Out Chicago rated it 1/5 stars and called it "a hodgepodge of genre clichés that proves as exciting as a bloody nose." David Guzman of Film Journal International said that the lack of originality was offset by the fresh premise and suspense. Paul Doro of Shock Till You Drop criticized the lack of back story for the creature and scenes that "appear to be a homeless man chasing idiots around an empty building."
