= The Witch in the Window =

2018 film by Andy Mitton

- Release poster
- Directed by: Andy Mitton
- Written by: Andy Mitton
- Produced by: Alex Draper; Richard W. King; Andy Mitton
- Starring: Alex Draper; Charlie Tacker; Arija Bareikis; Greg Naughton
- Cinematography: Justin Kane
- Edited by: Andy Mitton
- Music by: Andy Mitton
- Production company: One Bad House Films
- Distributed by: Shudder
- Release dates: July 23, 2018 (Fantasia); October 18, 2018 (United States)
- Running time: 77 minutes
- Country: United States
- Language: English

The Witch in the Window is a 2018 American supernatural horror film written and directed by Andy Mitton. The film had its world premiere at the Fantasia International Film Festival on July 23, 2018, followed by its US premiere at the Film Society of Lincoln Center in New York City on August 19, 2018. It was released on Shudder on October 18, 2018.

== Plot ==
It all started when a father and his twelve-year-old son arrived in rural Vermont to restore an old mansion. Soon they start seeing an ugly witch oftentimes displayed in the windows. The witch is the evil spirit of the former house owner; she is not happy with the new residents, so she tries to drive them out of the property by any means possible. The man and his teenage son initially do not pay attention to the evil ghost, but the further they progress in repairing the mansion, the stronger and more dangerous the ghost becomes. A local tells that many years ago, a real witch, Lydia, lived in the house with her husband and son, both of whom died mysteriously.

== Cast ==
- Arija Bareikis as Beverly
- Alex Draper as Simon
- Charlie Tacker as Finn
- Carol Stanzione as Lydia
- Greg Naughton as Louis
- Zach Jette as Louis' son

== Reception ==
The Witch in the Window received mixed to positive reviews from critics. On the review aggregator website Rotten Tomatoes, the film holds an approval rating of 69% based on 13 reviews, with an average rating of 6/10.

Kalyn Corrigan of Bloody Disgusting wrote, "Atmospheric, unsettling, and creepy as hell, The Witch in the Window is one of the most exciting horror movies of the year. The tangible, believable chemistry shared between talented actors Draper and Tacker who play father and son help the audience establish a strong bond with the characters that makes their situation seem all the more perilous when the two are put in danger. It's hard not to root for the pair to make it out alive, to re-establish their familial structure, and to banish the ghost from their new property – and because of this, it feels all the more heartbreaking each time life swats them down and puts them in their place." Matt Donato of /Film commented, "The Witch In The Window is a harrowing, scorchingly poignant and devastating glimpse into societal fears that have redefined family dinner conversations." Anton Bitel of Sight and Sound added, "Mitton's film never goes where you expect, while deploying its horror tropes to show the cracks and fissures in contemporary America's nuclear family structure. Its ending, so poignantly bittersweet, is very hard-earned".
