= We Go On =

- Directed by: Andy Mitton; Jesse Holland
- Written by: Andy Mitton; Jesse Holland
- Produced by: Logan Brown; Irina Bufano; Richard W. King
- Starring: Annette O'Toole; Clark Freeman; Giovanna Zacarías; Jay Dunn; Laura Heisler; John Glover
- Cinematography: Jeffrey Waldron
- Edited by: Andy Mitton; Jesse Holland
- Music by: Andy Mitton
- Production company: Untethered Films
- Release dates: 5 March 2016 (Cinequest Film Festival); 7 February 2017 (Japan)
- Running time: 89 minutes
- Country: United States
- Language: English

We Go On is a 2016 American horror thriller film directed by Andy Mitton and Jesse Holland, starring Annette O'Toole, Clark Freeman, Giovanna Zacarías, Jay Dunn, Laura Heisler and John Glover.

== Cast ==
- Annette O'Toole as Charlotte
  - Cassidy Freeman as Young Charlotte
- Clark Freeman as Miles
- Giovanna Zacarías as Josephina
- Jay Dunn as Nelson
- Laura Heisler as Alice
- John Glover as Dr. Ellison
- Tony Devon as Alberto

== Release ==
The film premiered at the Cinequest Film Festival on 5 March 2016.

== Reception ==
Evan Narcisse of Gizmodo wrote that the film's "seemingly modest budget belies its outsize impact".

James Evans of Starburst wrote, "It never quite pulls together, never quite chills as it could do, but overall is a decent film that has ambition and is an agreeable enough way to spend an hour and a half."

Chris Alexander of Comingsoon.net called the film "simple" and "effective" and wrote that O'Toole "delivers the movie’s strongest turn".

Dennis Harvey of Variety wrote that the film "provokes both admiration and some annoyance with its meandering, occasionally cryptic storytelling", and praised O'Toole's performance.
