= Sonny Marinelli =

American actor and voice actor (born 1967)

- Born: Anthony Savino Marinelli; May 2, 1967 (age 59); Brooklyn, New York, U.S.
- Occupations: Actor, voice actor
- Years active: 1991–present

Anthony Savino "Sonny" Marinelli (born May 2, 1967) is an American actor and voice actor. Marinelli is best known for his acting roles in Vegas, Entourage and Noel. Marinelli also played the role of mobster John Gotti in the 2001 television movie Boss of Bosses.

== Career ==
Marinelli attended the American Academy of Dramatic Arts in New York City to study acting. He first started acting in 1991 and his first film role was in Jumpin' at the Boneyard. He later went on to act in several television series with recurring roles in both Falcone and That's Life. In 2001, he played the role of mobster John Gotti in the television movie Boss of Bosses. He also voiced Henry Tomasino in the 2010 video game Mafia II and went on to provide additional voices in the 2016 video game Mafia III. Marinelli is also a founding member of the Actors Gym Theater Company along with Robert Moresco.

== Filmography ==
=== Film ===
Year	Title	Role	Notes
1991	Jumpin' at the Boneyard	Johnny	
1995	Fast Company	Johhny Lujak	Television film
1997	Blowfish	Nick Calabrese	
1998	Stingers	Joey	
1998	Wanted	Nick	
2001	Boss of Bosses	John Gotti	Television film
2004	Noel	Dennis	
2004	NYPD 2069		Television film
2005	Dot.Kill	Det. Mickey Harwell	
2006	10th & Wolf	Jimmy	
2010	The Fallen Faithful	Moran	
2011	Rosewood Lane	Barrett Tanner	
2011	Rites of Spring	Paul Nolan	
2015	Entourage	Randy	
2017	Disgraced	Darryl	Television film
2019	Manipulated	John Davis	

=== Television ===
Year	Title	Role	Notes
1995	Deadly Games		Episode: "The Camp Counselor: Part 2"
1997	413 Hope St.		Episode: "A Better Place"
1998	Mike Hammer, Private Eye	Brent	Episode: "The Long Road to Nowhere"
1998	Team Knight Rider	Constantine	Episode: "The Blonde Woman"
1998	Brooklyn South	Jenkins	Episode: "Don't You Be My Valentine"
1997–98	Michael Hayes		2 episodes
1998	Damon	The Thug	Episode: "The Actor"
1999	V.I.P.	Colecord	Episode: "The Quiet Brawler"
1999	Days of Our Lives	Joe Moroni	1 episode
2000	Falcone	Jimmy Suits	9 episodes
2000–01	That's Life	Lou Buttafucco	13 episodes
2001–03	NYPD Blue	Steve Riordan, Det. Lyle Trotter	2 episodes
2003	The Division		Episode: "Strangers"
2005	Blind Justice	Terry Jansen	2 episodes
2007	The Black Donnellys	Detective Sunny	Episode: "Pilot"
2007	Shark	Detective Richie Swift	Episode: "From Whom the Skel Rolls"
2008	ER	Sergeant Deturno	Episode: "Under Pressure"
2008–09	Raising the Bar	Det. Frank DiMeglio	2 episodes
2011	Entourage	John DeLuca	2 episodes
2012–13	Vegas	Nick 'Beansy' Cota	15 episodes
2014	The Mentalist	Marvin Gryska	Episode: "Forest Green"
2017	Scorpion	Frank	Episode: "Crime Every Mountain"

=== Video games ===
Year	Title	Role
2010	Mafia II	Henry Tomasino
2016	Mafia III	Additional Voices
