= Emily Davis =

American actress

Emily Davis is an American actress. She is best known for portraying American whistleblower Reality Winner in the documentary play Is This a Room, directed by Davis's frequent collaborator Tina Satter.

== Early life and education ==
Davis was born and raised in Oak Cliff, Texas, a neighborhood in South Dallas. She attended Booker T. Washington High School for the Performing and Visual Arts in Downtown Dallas. After high school, she moved to New York City and attended New York University, where she studied acting and neurolinguistics. She graduated with a BFA in Theater.

== Career ==
In 2009, Davis began collaborating with Half Straddle, an Obie Award-winning New York City based ensemble of performers and designers, led by Tina Satter. Half Straddle has premiered 10 full-length shows, plus a number of shorter works and video projects. Their work has been seen in theaters and festivals throughout the United States, Europe, Australia, and Asia. Davis has originated roles in multiple Half Straddle productions, including Nurses in New England, Away Uniform, and Seagull (Thinking of you), a reimagining of Anton Chekhov's The Seagull. Davis has also frequently collaborated with artists Erin Markey, Becca Blackwell, and Jess Barbagallo.

Davis is best known for her portrayal of American whistleblower Reality Winner in Half Straddle's Is This a Room, a verbatim staging of the FBI transcription of Winner's interrogation in June 2017. The piece premiered in January 2019 at The Kitchen in New York City, where Davis was described as "one of the most gifted realists in town" by Helen Shaw in Artforum. The piece went on to an extended, critically acclaimed off-Broadway run at the Vineyard Theatre in the fall of 2019. Ben Brantley of the New York Times called Davis's portrayal of Winner "one of the most trenchantly observed performances of the year."

Davis went on to reprise the role in the Broadway production of Is This a Room at the Lyceum Theatre in 2021, which marked her Broadway debut. She, again, received critical acclaim for her performance, being described as "sensational...[in a] career-making performance."

Davis has also been seen in various television roles, including Tulsa King on Paramount+, Servant on Apple TV+, and High Maintenance on HBO. She has also appeared in films such as The Plagiarists, The Harbinger, and the short film Gwen in Corpus, which she also wrote and directed.

== Awards ==
For her portrayal of Reality Winner in Is This A Room off-Broadway, Davis received the Obie Award for Performance and the Lucille Lortel Award for Outstanding Lead Actress, both in 2020. She was also nominated for the Drama Desk Award for Lead Actress.

== Works ==
=== Theatre ===
Title	Role	Theater	Director
Is This a Room	Reality Winner	The Lyceum Theatre, Vineyard Theatre, The Kitchen	Tina Satter
Singlet	Emily	The Bushwick Starr	Jordan Fein
Of Government	Heidi	Clubbed Thumb	Jeremy Bloom
My Old Man	Andrea	Dixon Place	Jess Barbagallo
O, Earth	Portia de Rossi	The Foundry	Dustin Wills
When the Tanks Break	Kate	The Drama League	Annie Tippe
Ancient Lives	Margo	The Kitchen	Tina Satter
In the Pony Palace/FOOTBALL	Eleanor	The Bushwick Starr	Tina Satter
The Seagull (Thinking of you)	Nina	P.S. 122	Tina Satter
Nurses in New England	Faye Greenwall	New Ohio Theatre	Tina Satter
FAMILY	Lily	Ontological-Hysteric Theater	Tina Satter
Particularly in the Heartland	Anna	P.S. 122	Rachel Chavkin

=== Film/TV ===
Title	Role	Notes
Moon V. State	Narrator (V.O.)	
Single Malt	Alyssa	
Widow's Bay	Shelby	Guest star
Tulsa King	Roxie	Recurring
The Patient	Mary	Guest star
Servant	Heather	Guest star
The Harbinger	Mavis	
American Rust	Sue Herlitz	Recurring
Cryptozoo	Various (V.O.)	
White Wedding	Kelly	
High Maintenance	Jennie	Guest star
The Plagiarists	Allison	
Gwen in Corpus	Gwen	Also director and writer
Valeria	Nurse	
My Entire High School Sinking...	Various (V.O.)	
The Amy Character	Anne	
