= Forests of the United States =

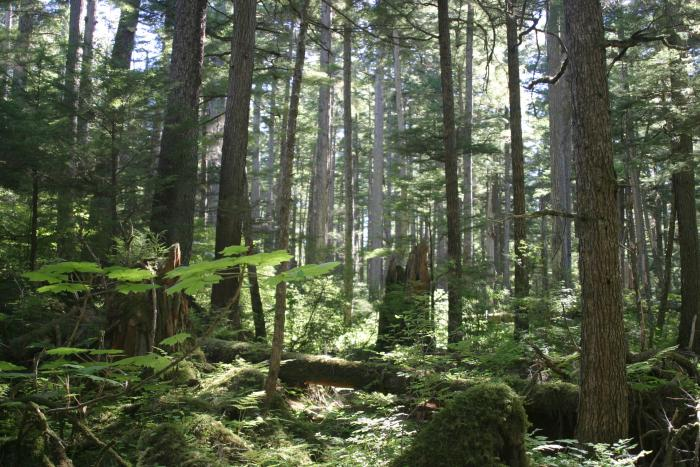
Tongass National Forest, Alaska

It has been estimated that before European settlement, forests in the United States mainland covered nearly 1 billion acres (4,000,000 km^{2}). Since the mid-1600s, about 300 million acres (1,200,000 km^{2}) of forest have been cleared, primarily for agriculture during the 19th century.

As of 2023, approximately 36% of the US is forested. Excluding the U.S. territories, forested land in the U.S. covers roughly 811,581,000 acres (3,284,351 square kilometers). As of 2005, the United States ranked seventh in the rate of loss of its old growth forests.

== Current coverage ==
While total forest area has been relatively stable for the last 100 years, there have been significant regional shifts in the area and composition of the nation's forests. Reversion of marginal farmland in the east, large scale planting in the South, and fire suppression have contributed to increases in forest area. Urbanization, conversion to agriculture, reservoir construction, and natural disasters have been major factors contributing to loss of forests.

A Quarter Century US Forest Disturbance History from Landsat – the NAFD-NEX Products

Eastern forests cover about 384 million acres (1,550,000 km^{2}) and are predominantly broadleaf (74%), with the exception of extensive coniferous forests and plantations in the southern coastal region. These are largely in private ownership (83%). By contrast, about 363 million acres (1,470,000 km^{2}) of western forests are predominantly coniferous (78%) and in public ownership (57%). Nearly ten million private individuals own about 422 million acres (1,710,000 km^{2}) of forest and other wooded land. Most public forest land is held by four Federal agencies (United States Forest Service, Bureau of Land Management, National Park Service, Fish and Wildlife Service) as well as numerous state, county, and municipal government organizations.

Major uses of forests include timber production, recreation, hunting, fishing, watershed and fisheries protection, wildlife habitat and biodiversity protection, and gathering nontimber products such as berries, mushrooms, and medicinal plants.

There are boreal forests in Alaska. Forests in Hawaii and the U.S. territories are tropical.

The most heavily forested regions of the U.S. are Maine, New Hampshire, American Samoa, the Northern Mariana Islands and West Virginia; the least heavily forested regions are North Dakota, Nebraska, and South Dakota.

The U.S. had a 2018 Forest Landscape Integrity Index mean score of 6.65/10, ranking it 67th globally out of 172 countries.

== Environmental issues ==
=== Deforestation ===
Virgin forest in the U.S.

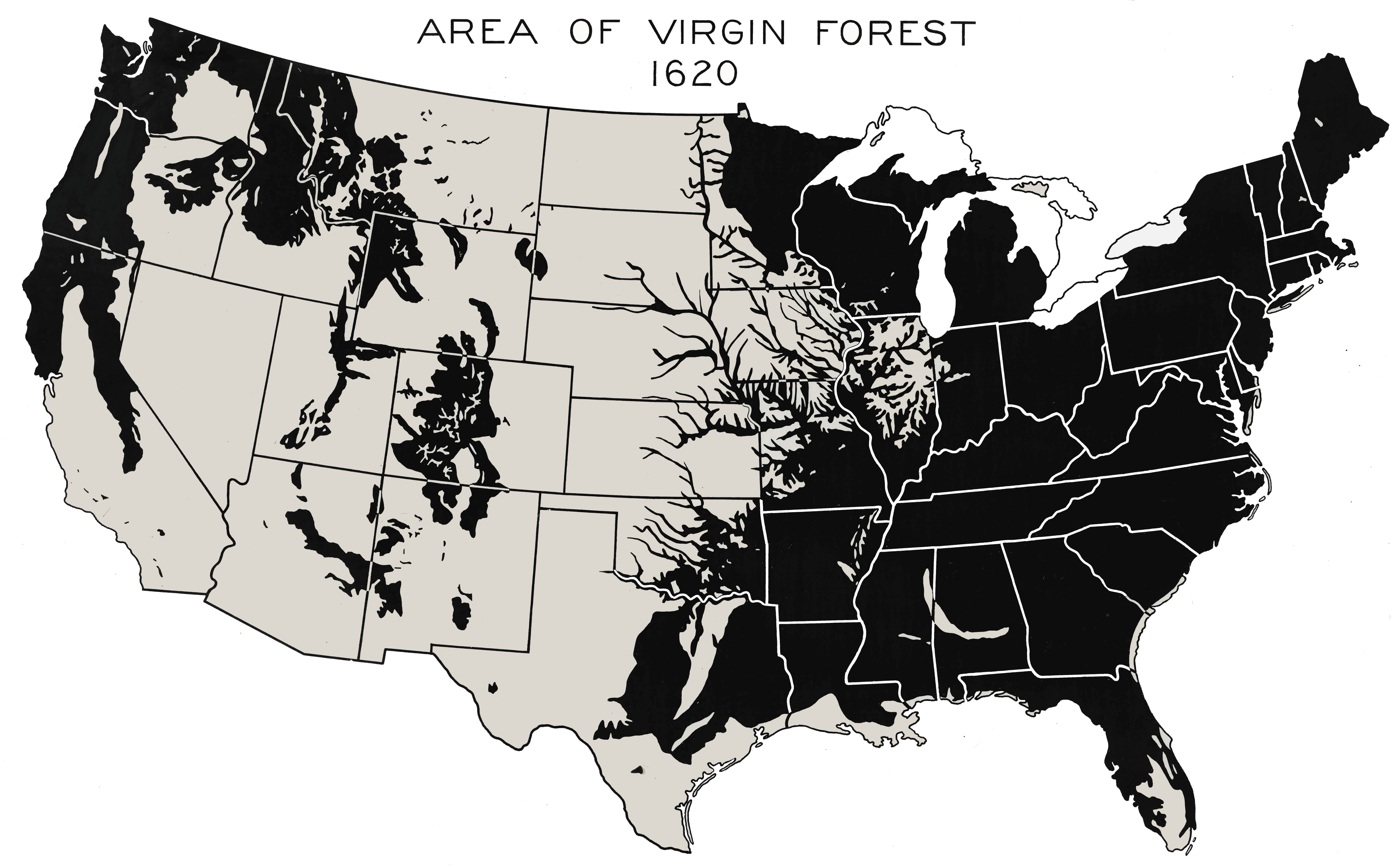
In 1620

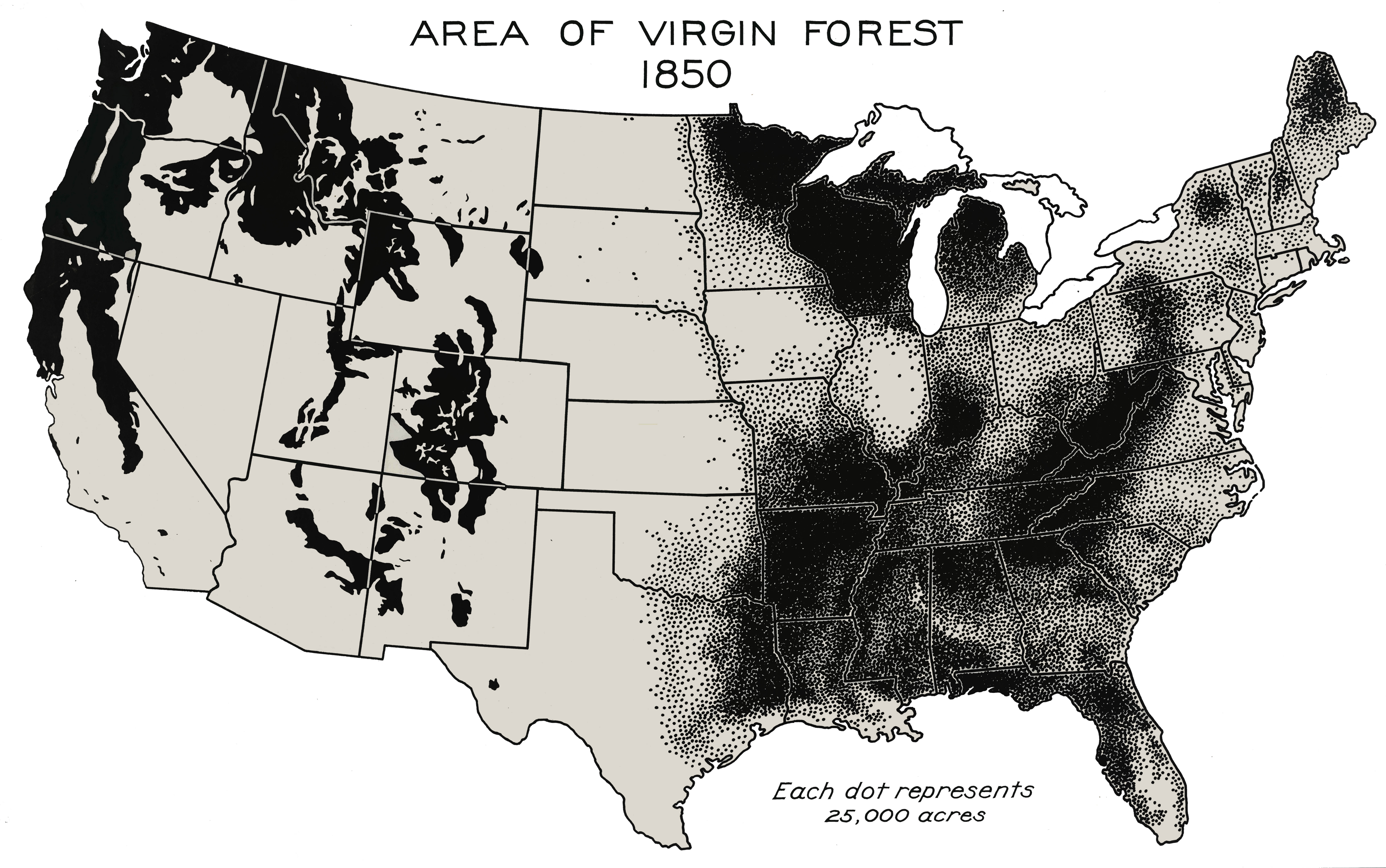
In 1850

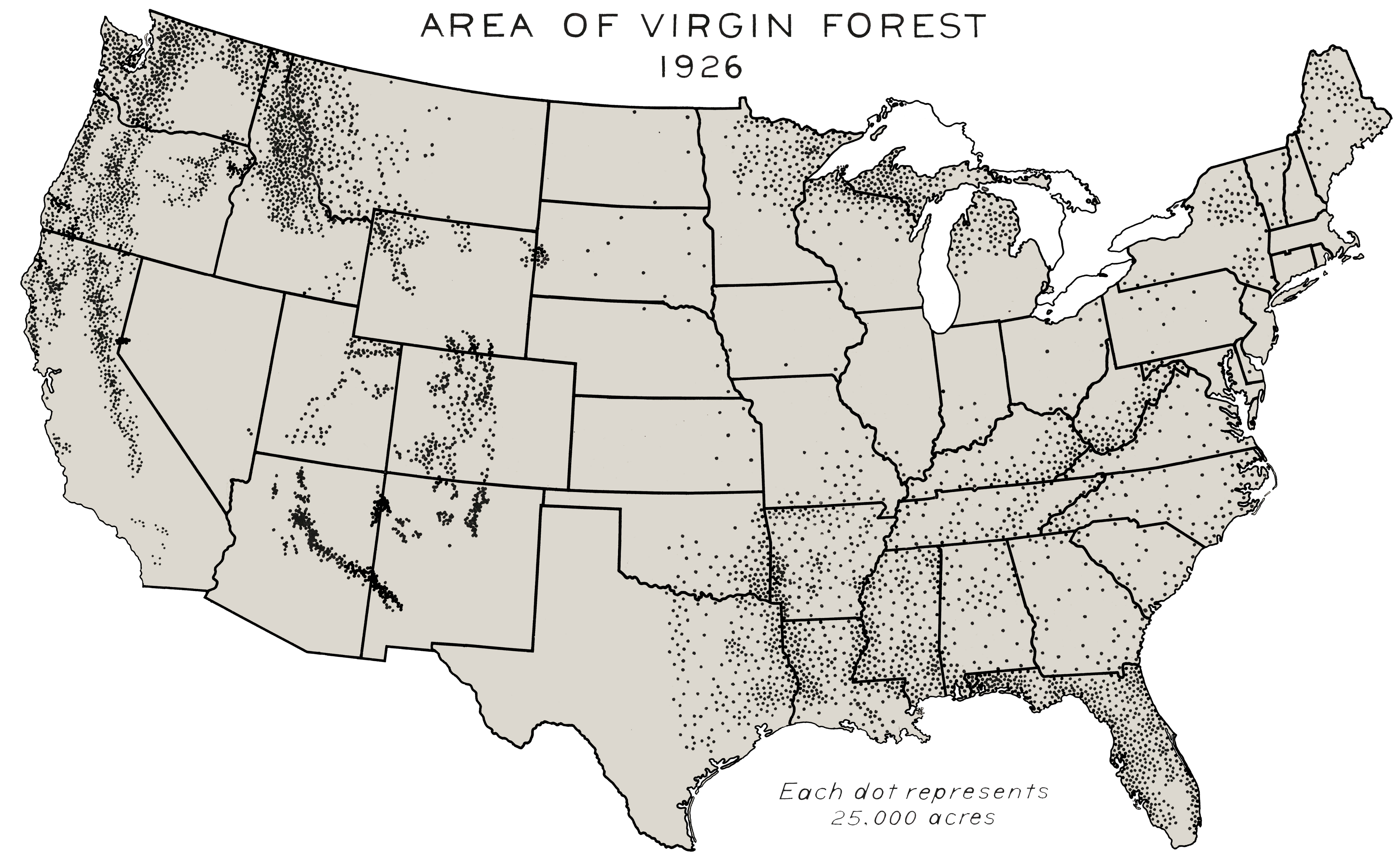
In 1926

In the United States, deforestation was an ongoing process until recently. Between 2010 and 2020, the US forests increased 0.03% annually, according to FAO (Food and Agriculture Organization of the United Nations). (Note: See FAO 2020, p. 18, table 8.)

Native Americans cleared millions of acres of forest for many reasons, including hunting, farming, berry production, and building materials. Prior to the arrival of European-Americans, about one half of the United States land area was forest, about 1,023,000,000 acres (4,140,000 km^{2}) estimated in 1630. Forest cover in the Eastern United States reached its lowest point in roughly 1872 with about 48 percent compared to the amount of forest cover in 1620. The majority of deforestation took place prior to 1910 with the Forest Service reporting the minimum forestation as 721,000,000 acres (2,920,000 km^{2}) around 1920. The forest resources of the United States remained relatively constant through the 20th century. The Forest Service reported total forestation as 766,000,000 acres (3,100,000 km^{2}) in 2012. A 2017 study estimated 3 percent loss of forest between 1992 and 2001.

The 2005 (FAO) Global Forest Resources Assessment ranked the United States as seventh highest country losing its old-growth forests, a vast majority of which were removed prior to the 20th century.

In 2025, new research by Earth System Science Data showed that over the past four centuries vast stretches of forestland in the United States giving way to agriculture, urban development, and industry. Since the 1600s, the country has a net loss of approximately 258 million acres of forest.

=== Invasive species ===
Invasive species are a significant threat to forests in the United States, harming native ecosystems, reducing biodiversity, and causing tree mortality across millions of acres. Many non-native insects, pathogens, and plants have become established in U.S. forests in the absence of natural predators or host resistance, allowing them to spread rapidly and damage native species. Insects such as the emerald ash borer have caused widespread mortality in ash, hemlock, and hardwood forests, while pathogens like sudden oak death and white pine blister rust have further disrupted forest health.

Projects have been undertaken to remove invasive species from forests in the U.S.; for example, in the U.S. Minor Outlying Islands, rats were successfully eradicated in the tropical forest on Palmyra Atoll.

=== Wildfire ===
The five federal regulatory agencies managing forest fire response and planning for 676 million acres in the United States are the Bureau of Land Management, the Bureau of Indian Affairs, the National Park Service, the United States Forest Service and the United States Fish and Wildlife Service. Several hundred million U.S. acres of wildfire management are also conducted by state, county, and local fire management organizations. In 2014, legislators proposed The Wildfire Disaster Funding Act to provide $2.7 billion fund appropriated by congress for the USDA and Department of Interior to use in fire suppression. The bill is a reaction to United States Forest Service and Department of Interior costs of Western Wildfire suppression appending that amounted to $3.5 billion in 2013.

== Protected areas ==
=== National forests ===
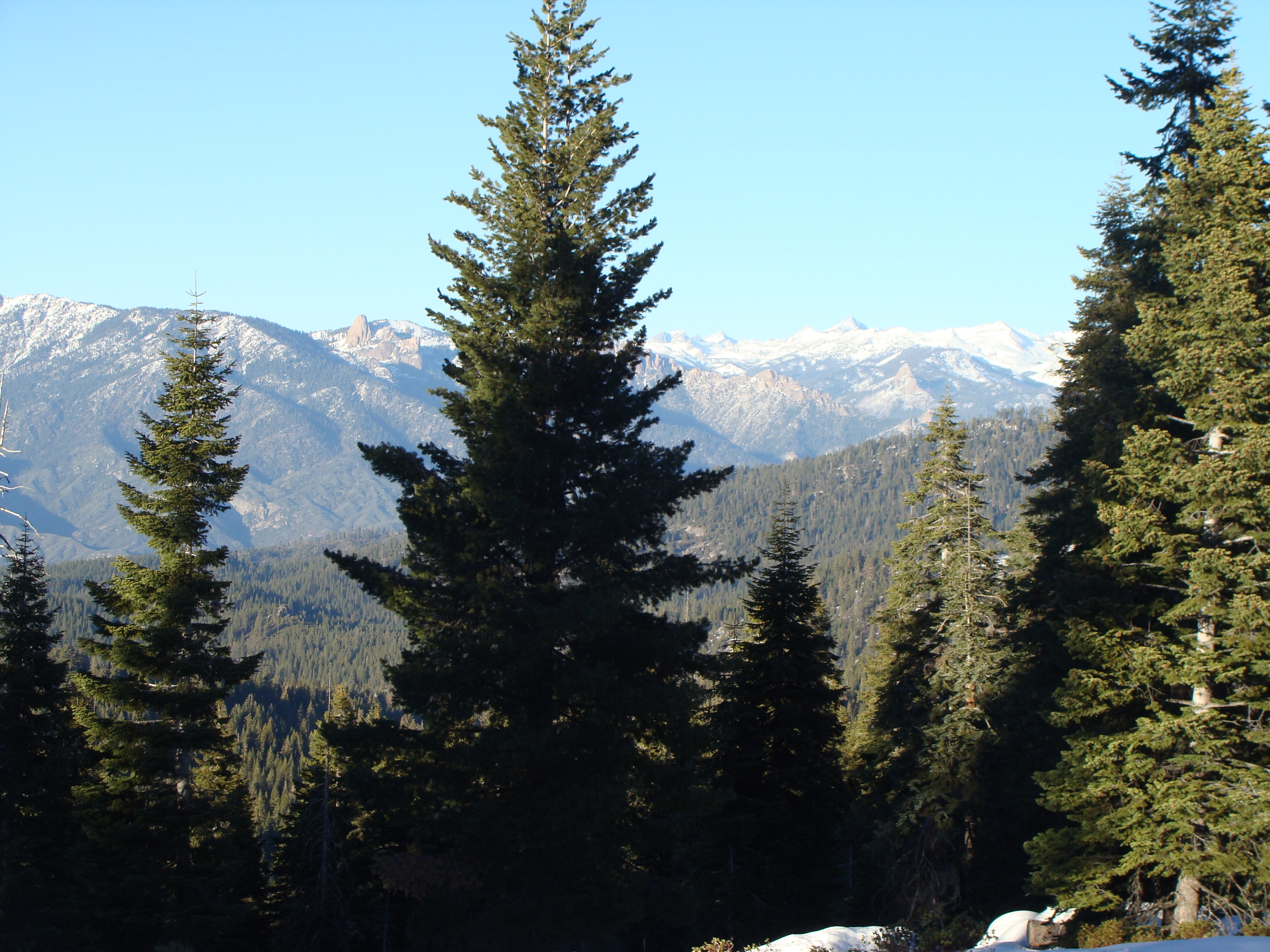
Sierra Nevada in the Sequoia National Forest, California

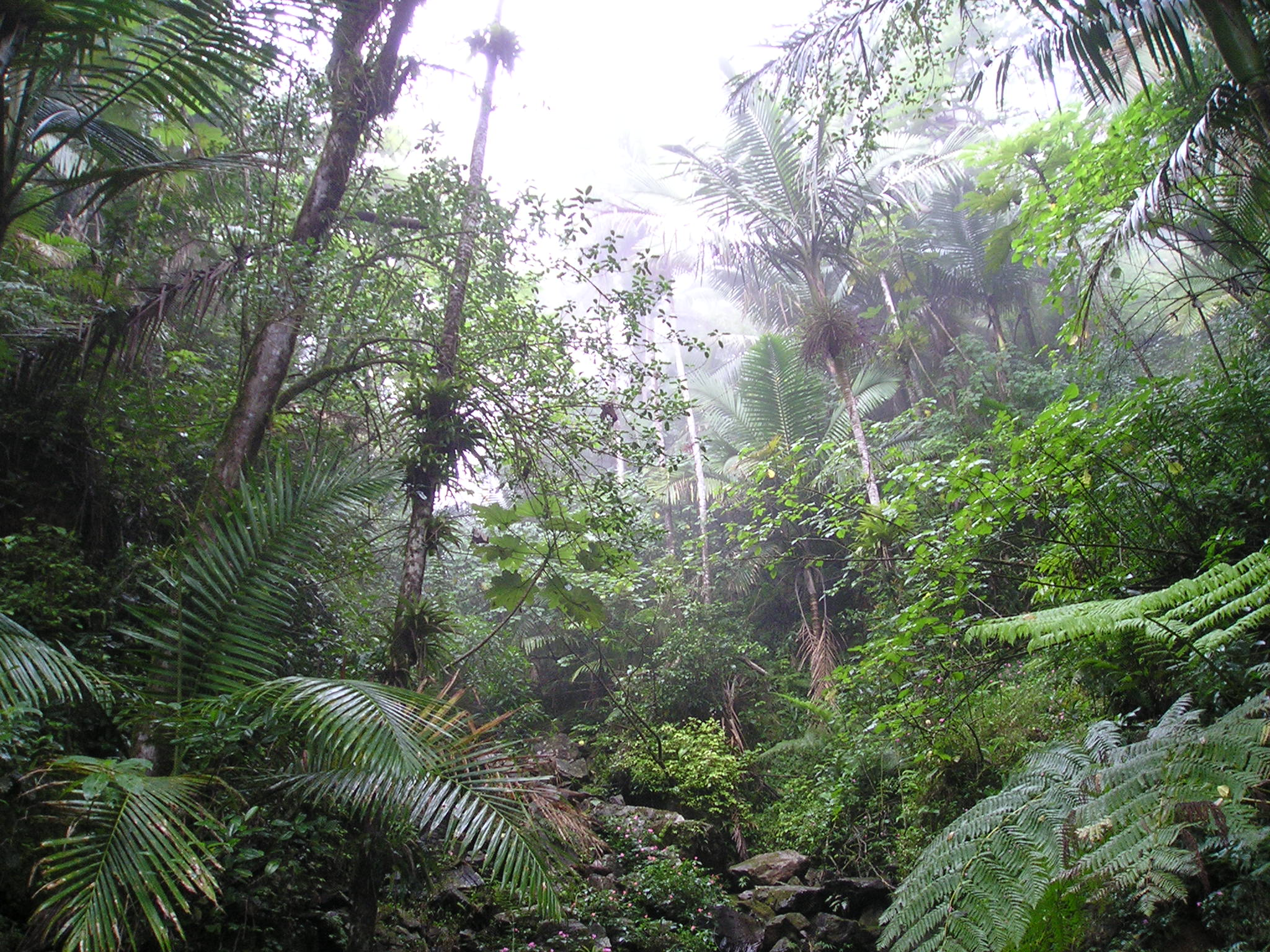
Rainforest in the El Yunque National Forest, Puerto Rico

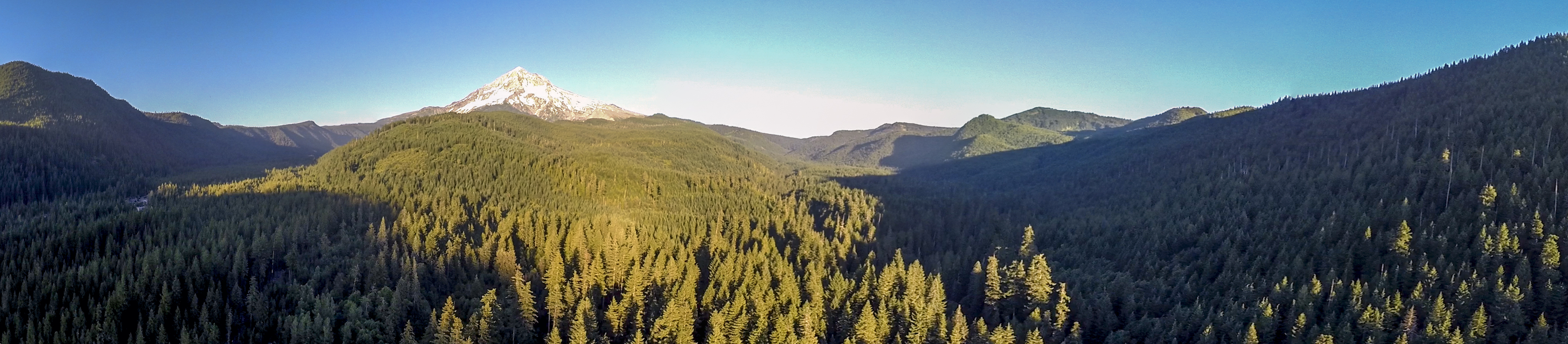
Mount Hood National Forest, Oregon

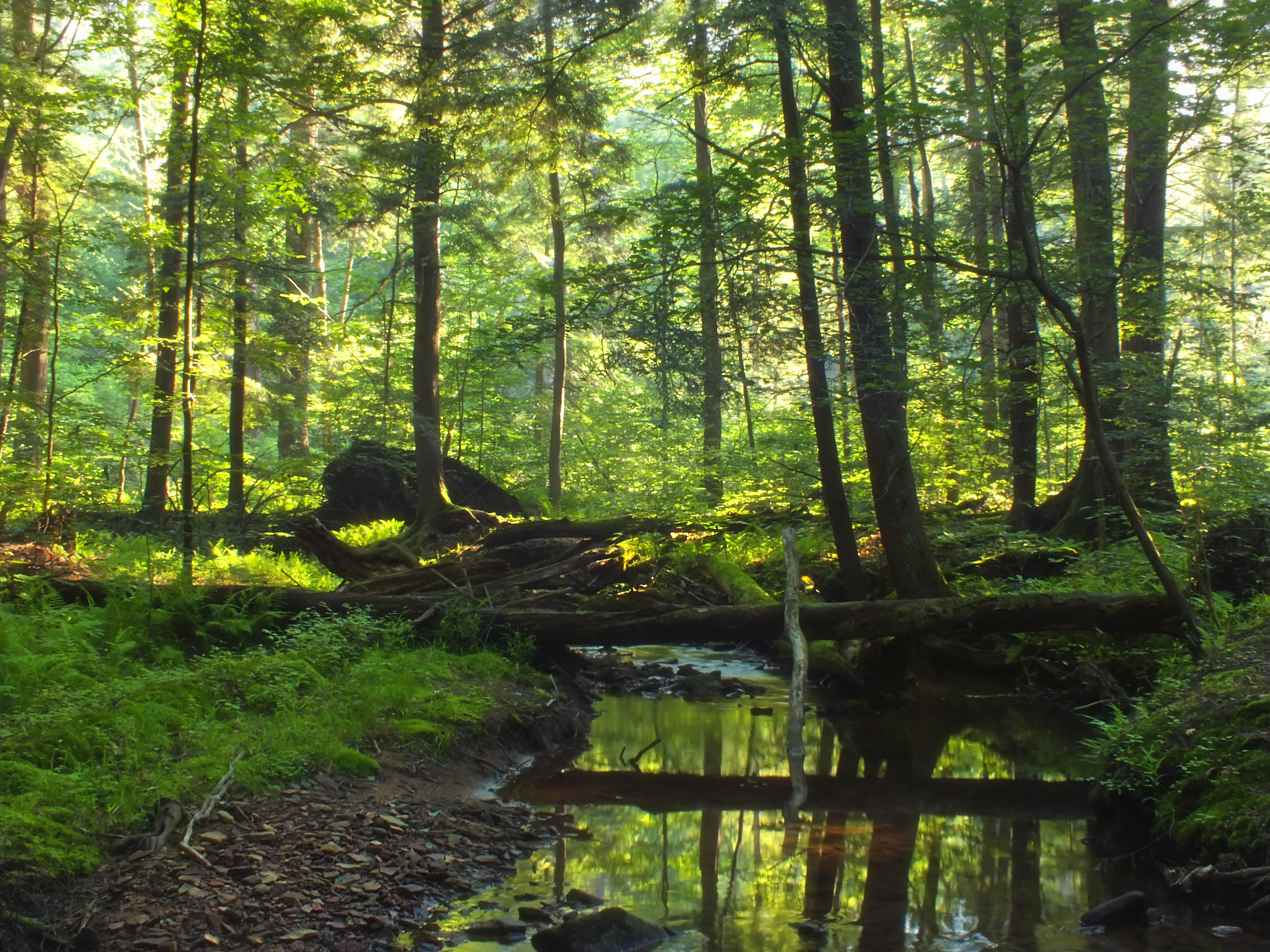
Allegheny National Forest, Pennsylvania

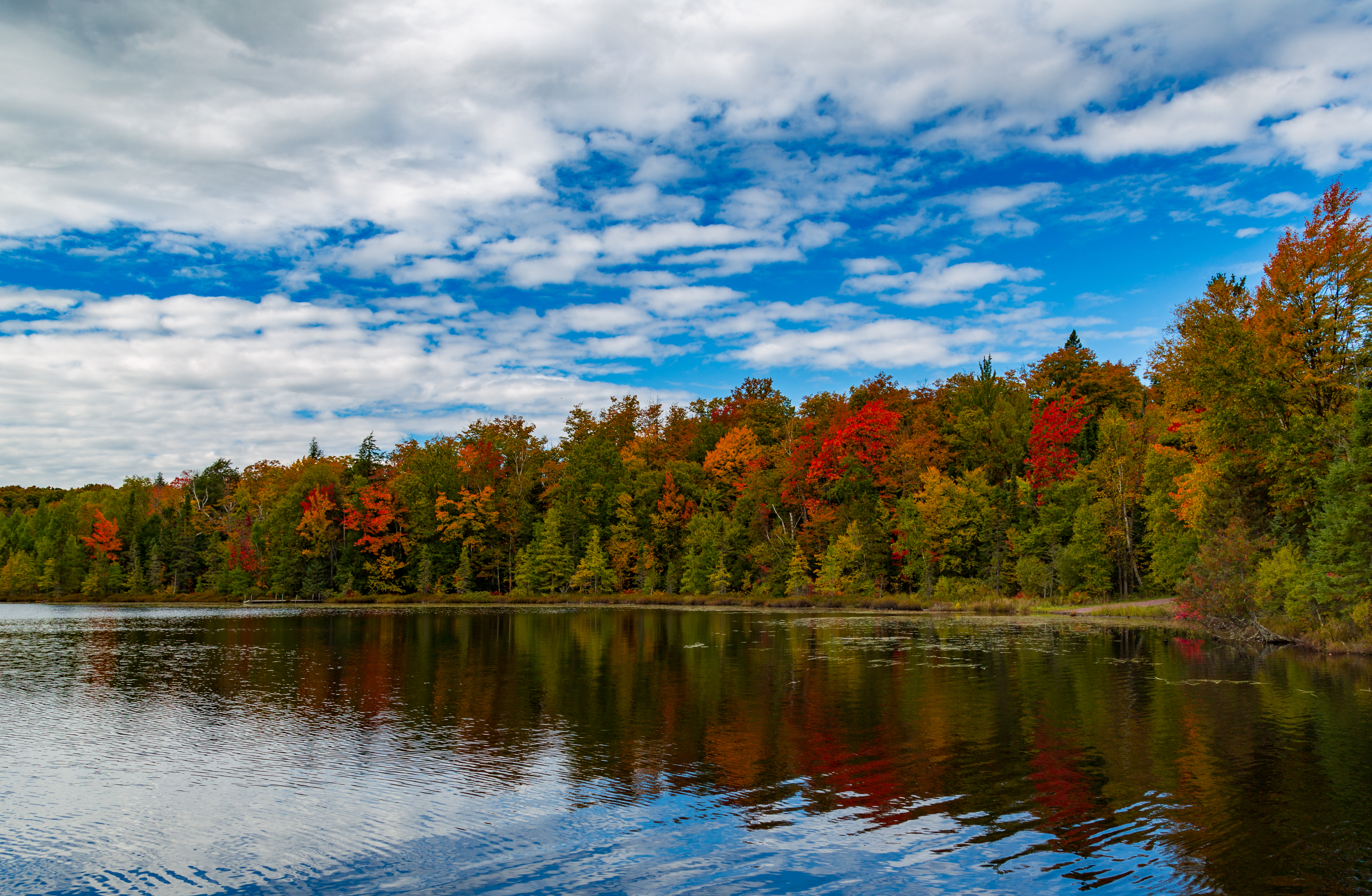
Fall colors in Ottawa National Forest, Michigan

In the United States, national forest is a classification of protected and managed federal lands that are largely forest and woodland areas. They are owned collectively by the American people through the federal government and managed by the United States Forest Service, a division of the United States Department of Agriculture. The U.S. Forest Service is also a forestry research organization that provides financial assistance to the state and local forestry industry. There are 154 national forests in the United States.

== Economy ==
As at 2022 the United States was the largest producer of coniferous industrial roundwood, with a production of 306 million m3.

== See also ==
- Assisted migration of forests in North America
- François André Michaux, a botanist noted for his work on the trees found in America
- Hawaiian tropical rainforests
- List of national forests of the United States
- National Park Service
- Senate Committee on Forest Reservations and the Protection of Game
- United States Forest Service
- Forests of Mexico
- Forests of Canada
