= Critics' Choice Television Award for Best Actress in a Movie/Miniseries =

American television award

Critics' Choice Television Award for Best Actress in a Limited Series or Movie Made for Television
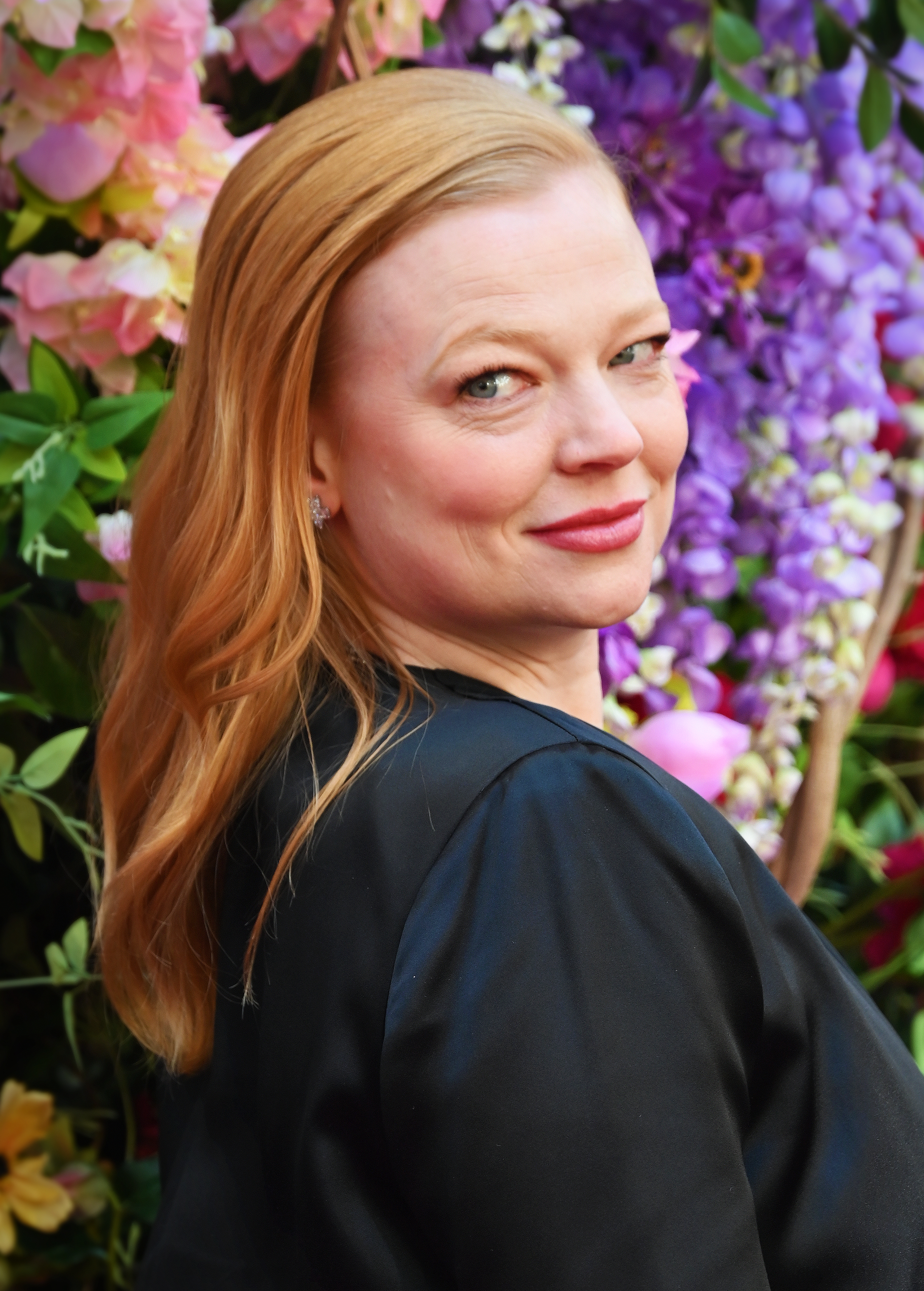
- The 2026 recipient: Sarah Snook
- Country: United States
- Presented by: Critics Choice Association
- First award: 2012
- Currently held by: Sarah Snook – All Her Fault (2025)
- Website: criticschoice.com

The Critics' Choice Television Award for Best Actress in a Movie/Miniseries is one of the award categories presented annually by the Critics' Choice Television Awards (BTJA) to recognize the work done by television actors.

The award was introduced in 2012. The winners are selected by a group of television critics that are part of the Broadcast Television Critics Association.

Jessica Lange holds the record for most nominations in this category with 6 nominations. She was nominated four times for her work on the American Horror Story anthology series, specifically for Murder House (2012), Asylum (2013) Coven (2014), and Freak Show (2015), once for Feud: Bette and Joan (2018) and her latest nomination for The Great Lillian Hall (2025).

Sarah Snook is the current winner in this category for All Her Fault (2026).

== Winners and nominees ==
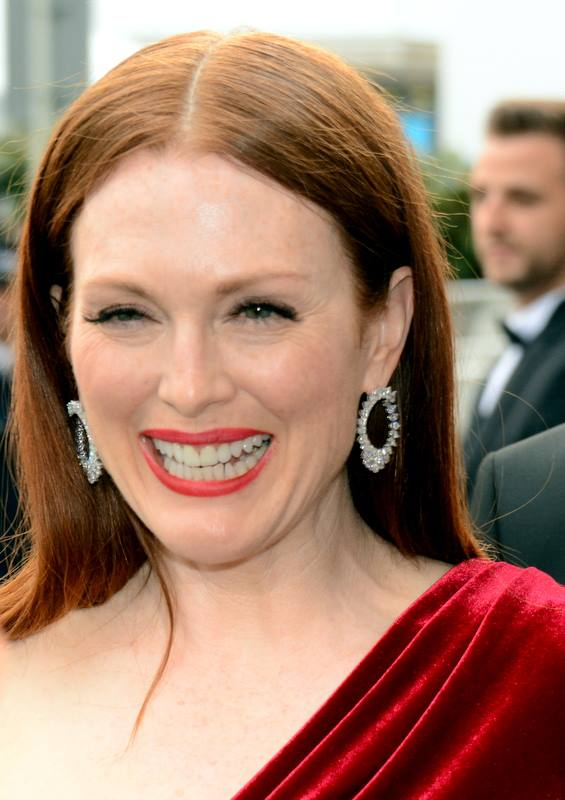
Julianne Moore won for Game Change (2012)

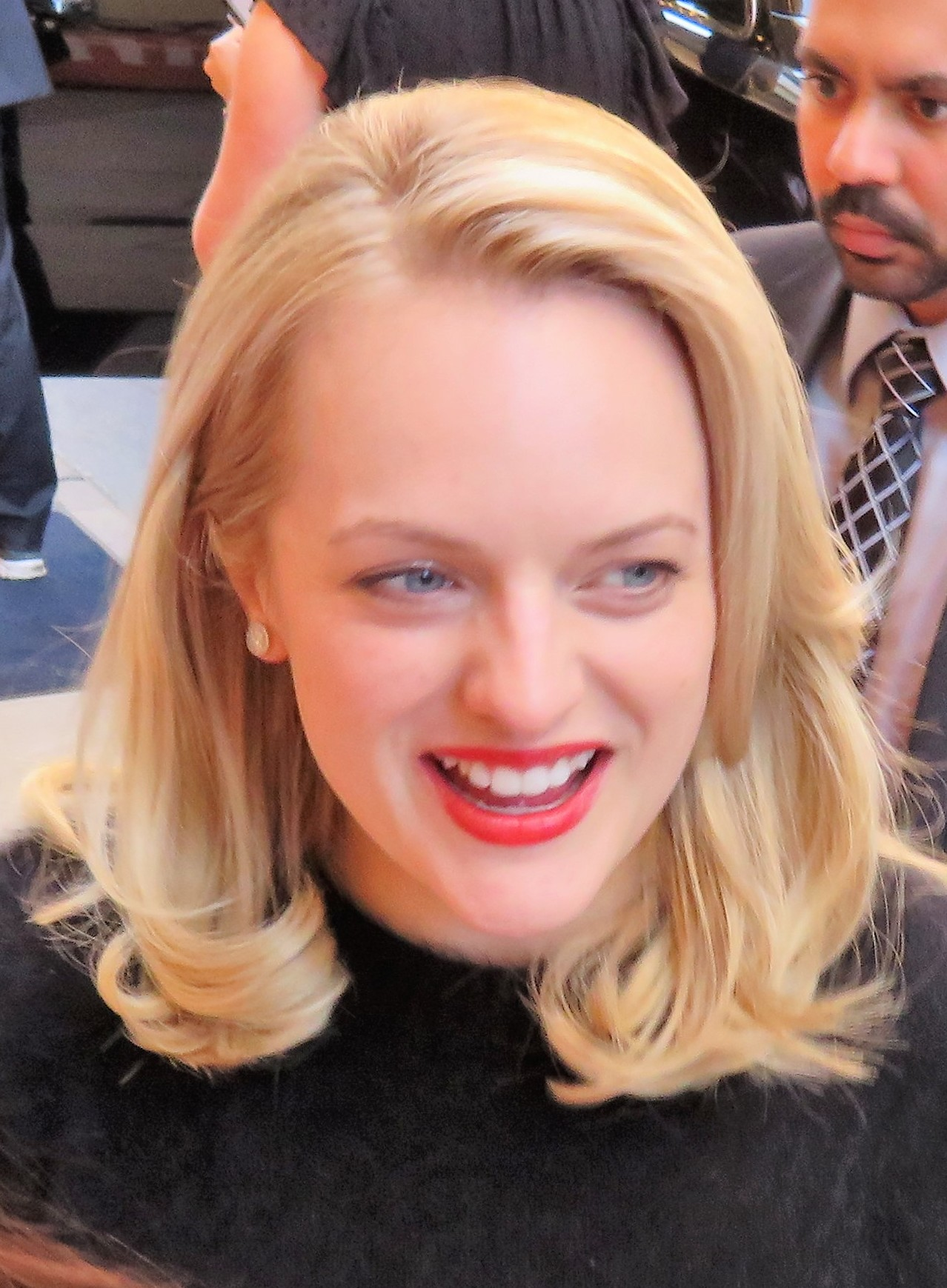
Elisabeth Moss won for Top of the Lake (2013)

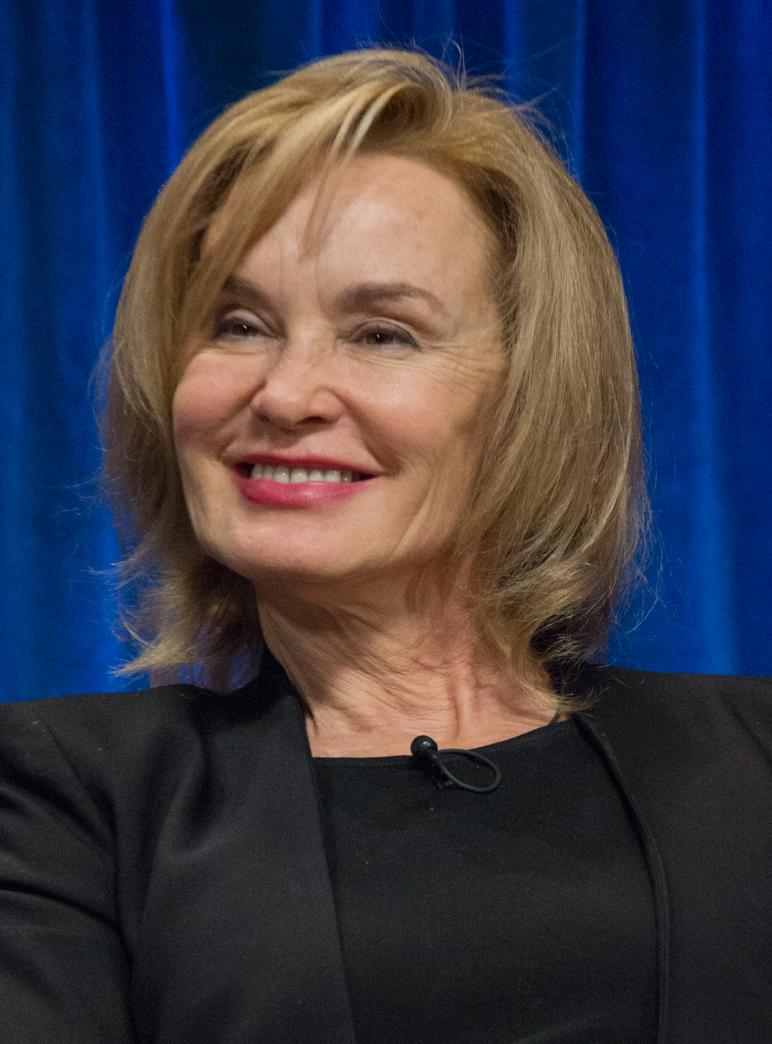
Jessica Lange won for American Horror Story: Coven (2014)

Frances McDormand won for Olive Kitteridge (2015)

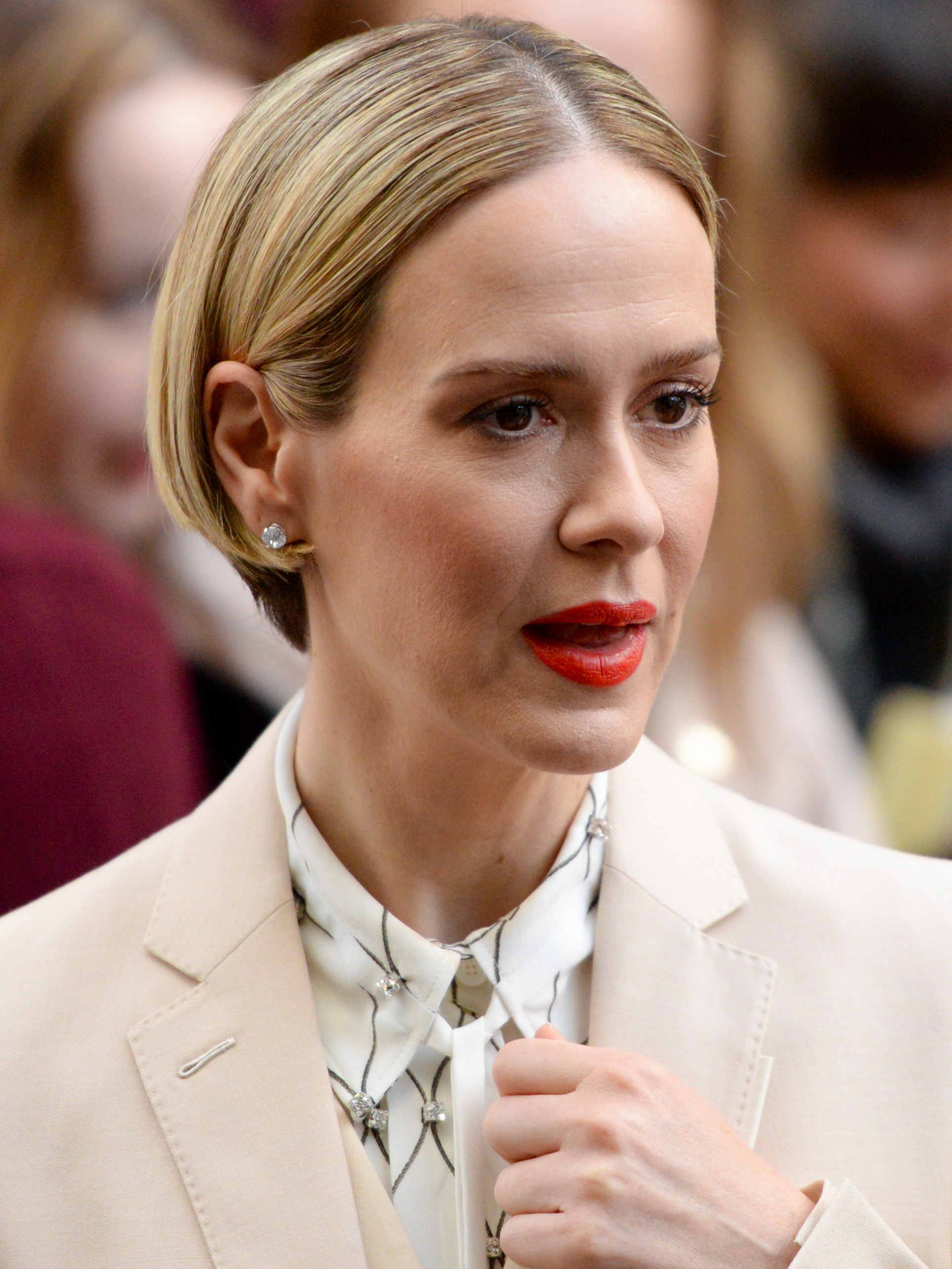
Sarah Paulson won for The People v. O. J. Simpson: American Crime Story (2016)

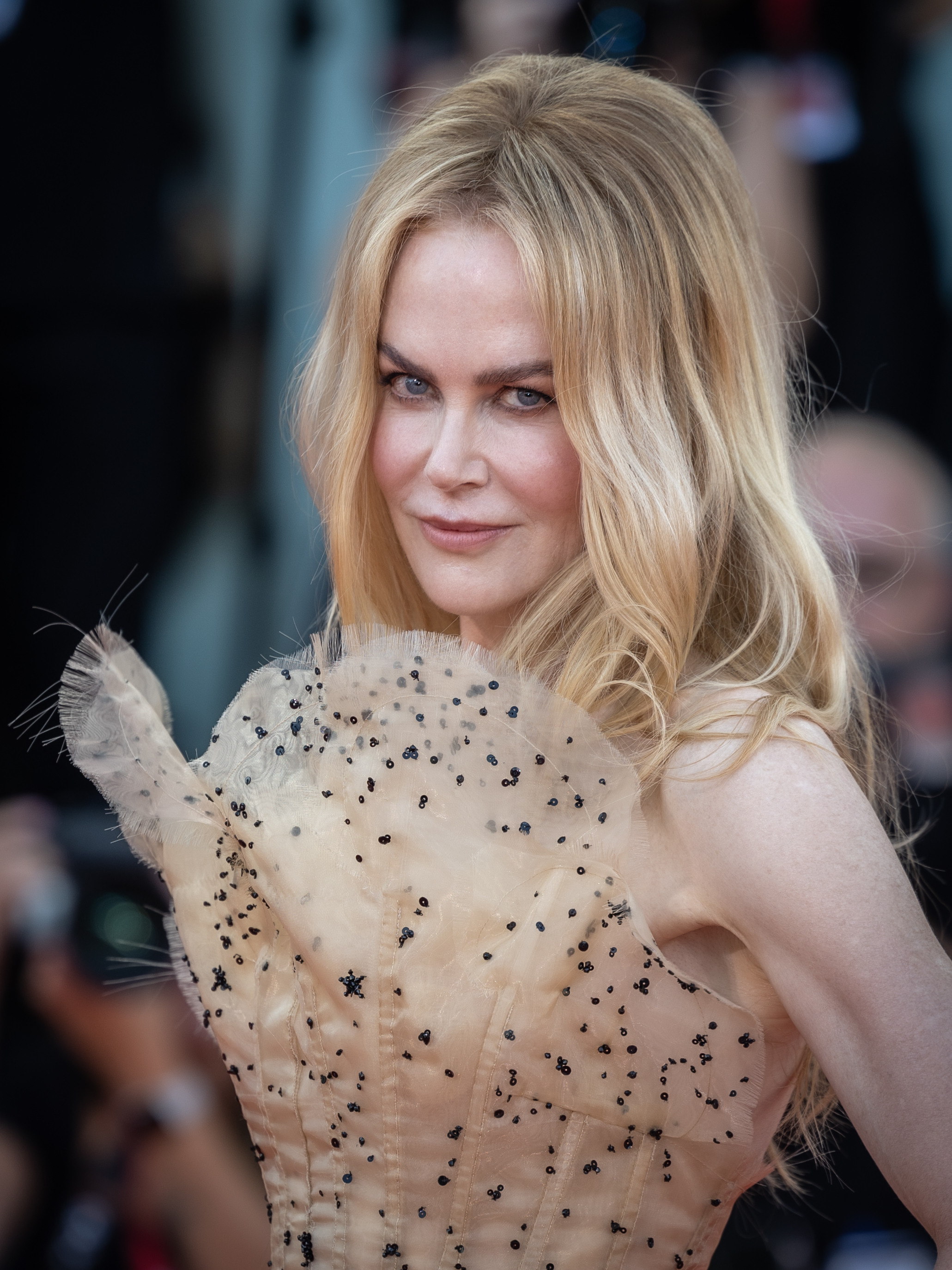
Nicole Kidman won for Big Little Lies (2017)

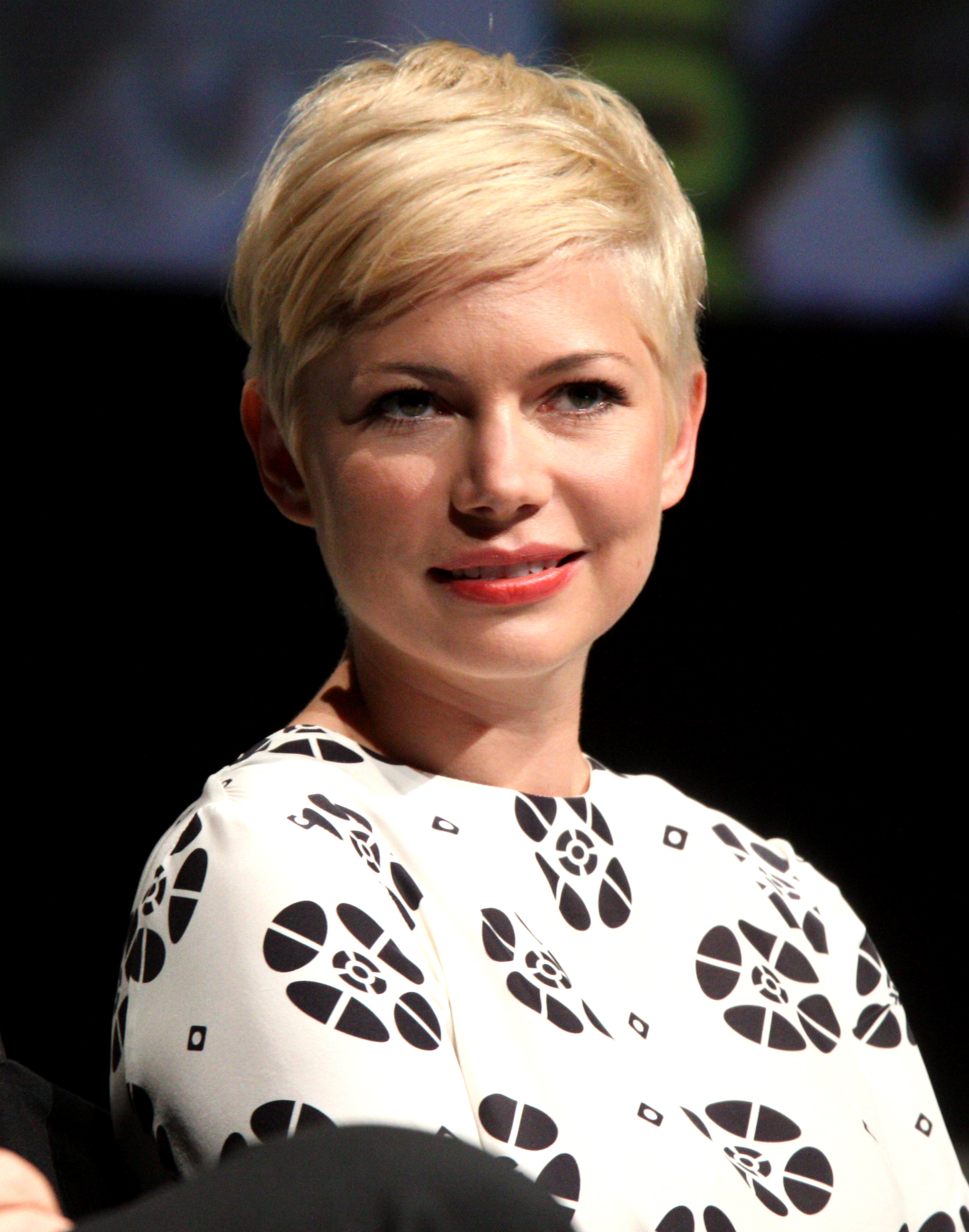
Michelle Williams won for Fosse/Verdon (2019)

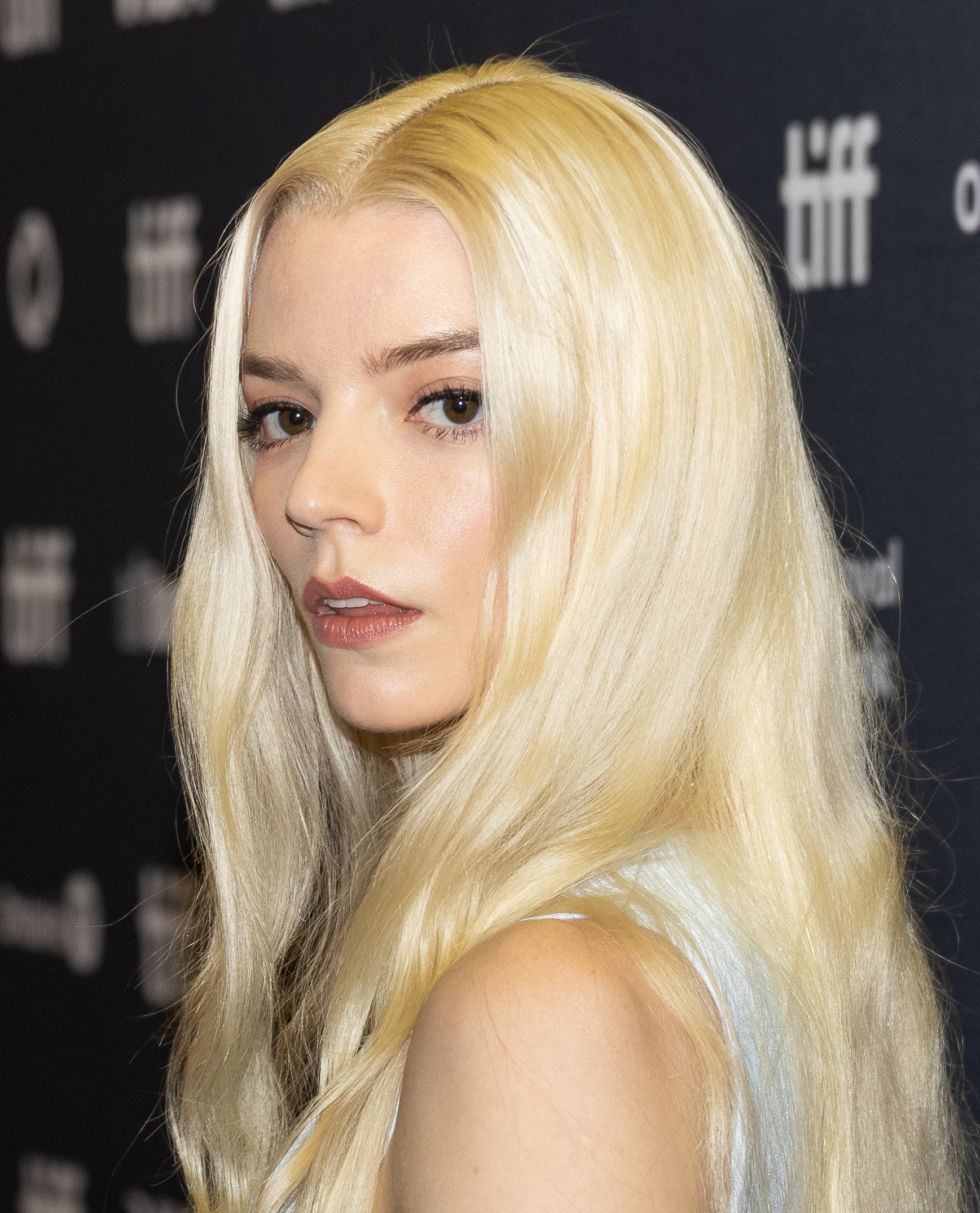
Anya Taylor-Joy won for The Queen's Gambit (2021)

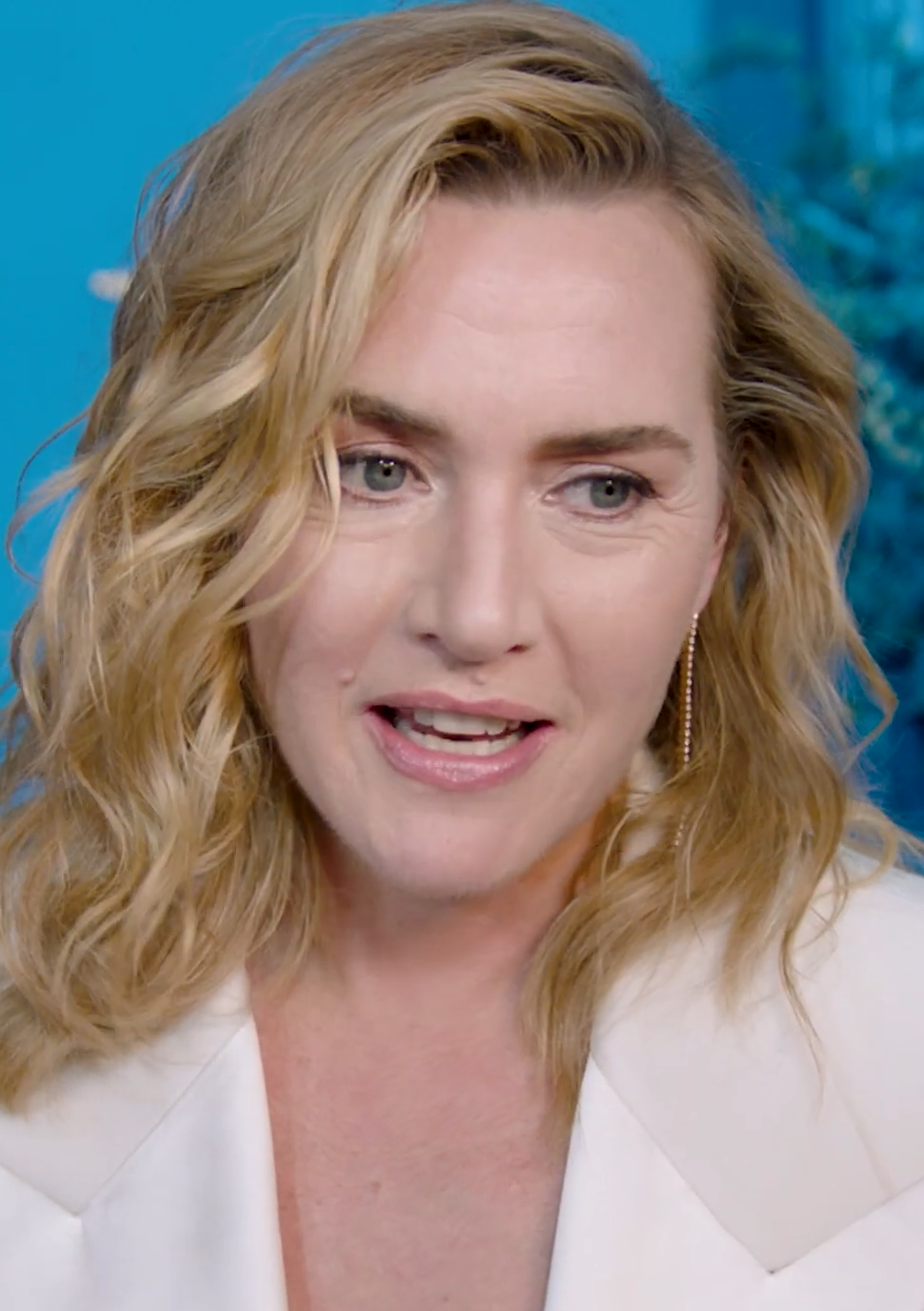
Kate Winslet won for Mare of Easttown (2022)

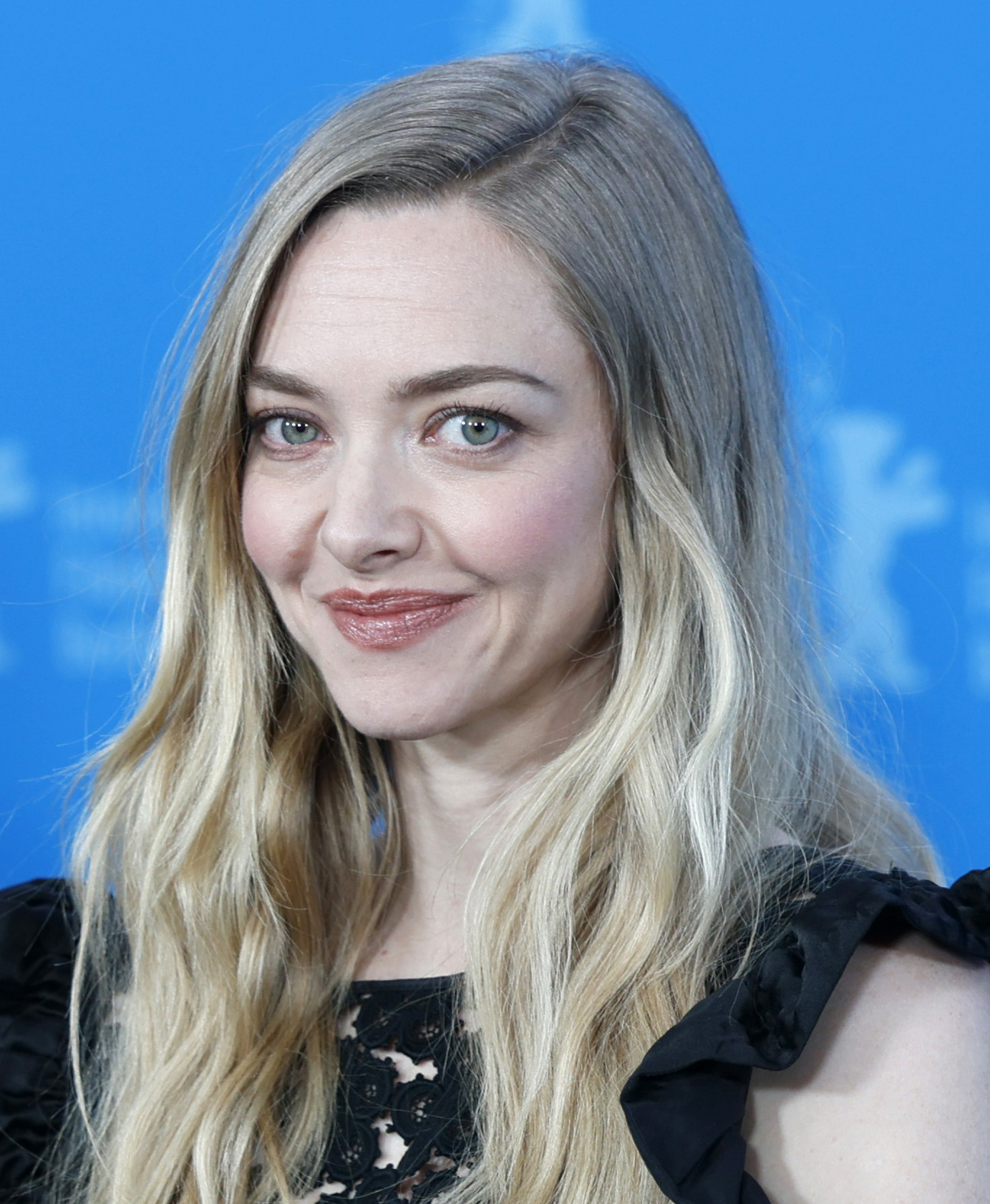
Amanda Seyfried won for The Dropout (2023)

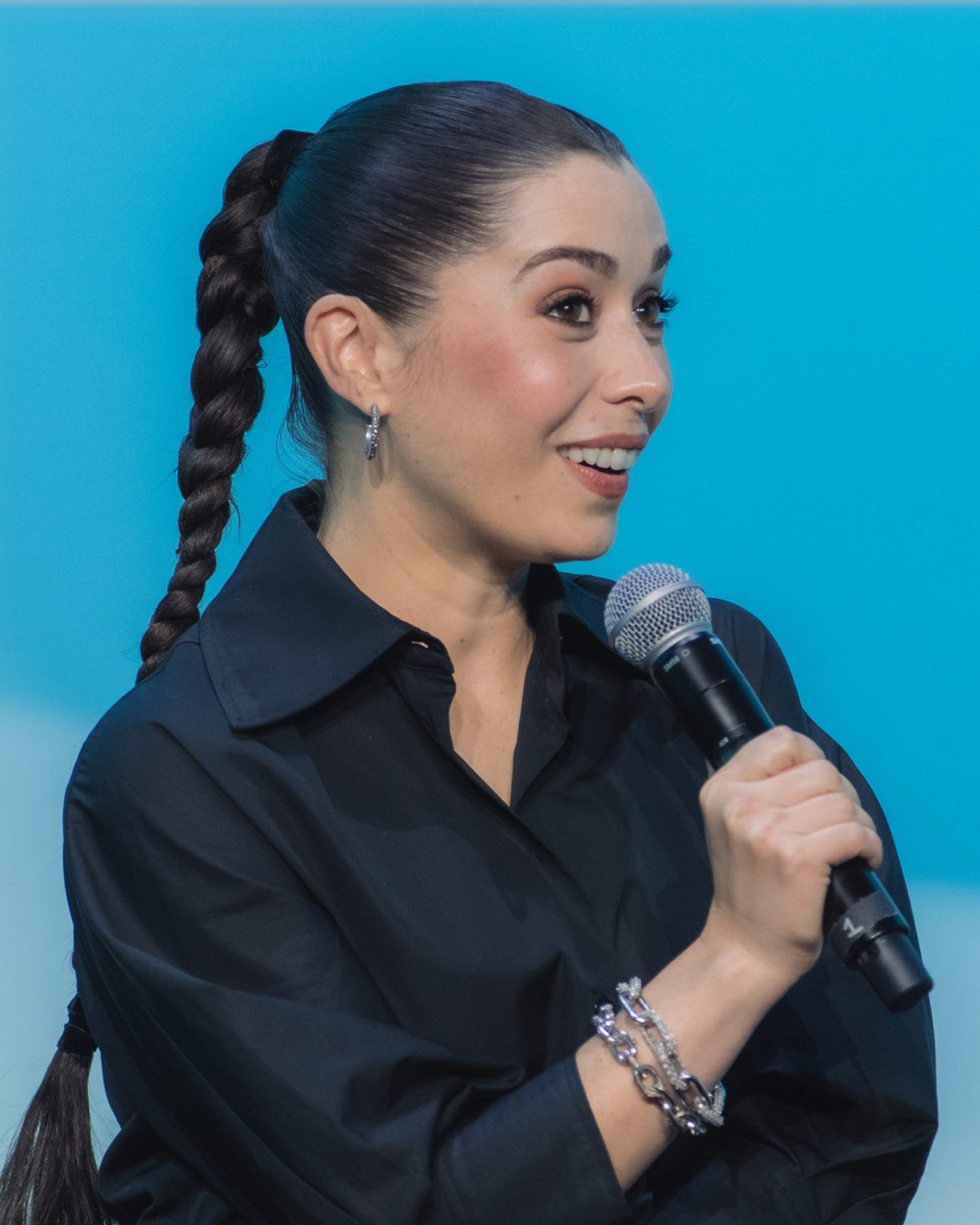
Cristin Milioti won for The Penguin (2025)

=== 2010s ===
Year	Actor	Role	Program	Network
2012	Julianne Moore	Game Change	Sarah Palin	HBO
2012	Gillian Anderson	Great Expectations	Miss Havisham	PBS
2012	Lara Pulver	Sherlock	Irene Adler	PBS
2012	Patricia Clarkson	Five	Mia Knowles	Lifetime
2012	Jessica Lange	American Horror Story	Constance Langdon	FX
2012	Emily Watson	Appropriate Adult	Janet Leach	Sundance Channel
2013	Elisabeth Moss	Top of the Lake	Det. Robin Griffin	Sundance Channel
2013	Angela Bassett	Betty & Coretta	Coretta Scott King	Lifetime
2013	Romola Garai	The Hour	Bel Rowley	BBC America
2013	Rebecca Hall	Parade's End	Sylvia Tietjens	HBO
2013	Jessica Lange	American Horror Story: Asylum	Sister Jude Martin	FX
2013	Sigourney Weaver	Political Animals	Elaine Barrish Hammond	USA
2014	Jessica Lange	American Horror Story: Coven	Fiona Goode	FX
2014	Holliday Grainger	Bonnie & Clyde	Bonnie Parker	A&E / Lifetime
2014	Helena Bonham Carter	Burton & Taylor	Elizabeth Taylor	BBC America
2014	Minnie Driver	Return to Zero	Maggie Royal	Lifetime
2014	Whoopi Goldberg	A Day Late and a Dollar Short	Viola	Lifetime
2014	Cicely Tyson	The Trip to Bountiful	Mrs. Carrie Watts	Lifetime
2015	Frances McDormand	Olive Kitteridge	Olive Kitteridge	HBO
2015	Aunjanue Ellis	The Book of Negroes	Aminata Diallo	BET
2015	Maggie Gyllenhaal	The Honourable Woman	Nessa Stein	SundanceTV
2015	Felicity Huffman	American Crime	Barbara Hanlon	ABC
2015	Jessica Lange	American Horror Story: Freak Show	Elsa Mars	FX
2015	Queen Latifah	Bessie	Bessie Smith	HBO
2016 (1)	Kirsten Dunst	Fargo	Peggy Blumquist	FX
2016 (1)	Rachel McAdams	True Detective	Det. Antigone "Ani" Bezzerides	HBO
2016 (1)	Kathy Bates	American Horror Story: Hotel	Iris	FX
2016 (1)	Sarah Hay	Flesh and Bone	Claire Robbins	Starz
2016 (1)	Shanice Williams	The Wiz Live!	Dorothy Gale	NBC
2016 (1)	Alyvia Alyn Lind	Dolly Parton's Coat of Many Colors	Dolly Parton	NBC
2016 (2)	Sarah Paulson	The People v. O. J. Simpson: American Crime Story	Marcia Clark	FX
2016 (2)	Olivia Colman	The Night Manager	Angela Burr	AMC
2016 (2)	Felicity Huffman	American Crime	Leslie Graham	ABC
2016 (2)	Lili Taylor	American Crime	Anne Blaine	ABC
2016 (2)	Cynthia Nixon	Killing Reagan	Nancy Reagan	Nat Geo
2016 (2)	Kerry Washington	Confirmation	Anita Hill	HBO
2018	Nicole Kidman	Big Little Lies	Celeste Wright	HBO
2018	Jessica Biel	The Sinner	Cora Tannetti	USA
2018	Alana Boden	I Am Elizabeth Smart	Elizabeth Smart	Lifetine
2018	Carrie Coon	Fargo	Gloria Burgle	FX
2018	Jessica Lange	Feud: Bette and Joan	Joan Crawford	FX
2018	Reese Witherspoon	Big Little Lies	Madeline Martha Mackenzie	HBO
2019	Amy Adams	Sharp Objects	Camille Preaker	HBO
2019	Patricia Arquette	Escape at Dannemora	Joyce "Tilly" Mitchell	Showtime
2019	Connie Britton	Dirty John	Debra Newell	Bravo
2019	Carrie Coon	The Sinner	Vera Walker	USA
2019	Laura Dern	The Tale	Jennifer Fox	HBO
2019	Anna Deavere Smith	Notes from the Field	Various Characters	HBO

=== 2020s ===
Year	Actor	Role	Program	Network
2020	Michelle Williams	Fosse/Verdon	Gwen Verdon	FX
2020	Kaitlyn Dever	Unbelievable	Marie Adler	Netflix
2020	Merritt Wever	Unbelievable	Det. Karen Duvall	Netflix
2020	Anne Hathaway	Modern Love	Lexi	Prime Video
2020	Megan Hilty	Patsy & Loretta	Patsy Cline	Lifetime
2020	Jessie Mueller	Patsy & Loretta	Loretta Lynn	Lifetime
2020	Joey King	The Act	Gypsy Blanchard	Hulu
2021	Anya Taylor-Joy	The Queen's Gambit	Beth Harmon	Netflix
2021	Cate Blanchett	Mrs. America	Phyllis Schlafly	FX on Hulu
2021	Michaela Coel	I May Destroy You	Arabella Essiedu	HBO
2021	Daisy Edgar-Jones	Normal People	Marianne Sheridan	Hulu
2021	Shira Haas	Unorthodox	Esther "Esty" Shapiro	Netflix
2021	Tessa Thompson	Sylvie's Love	Sylvie Parker	Prime Video
2022	Kate Winslet	Mare of Easttown	Mare Sheehan	HBO
2022	Danielle Brooks	Robin Roberts Presents: Mahalia	Mahalia Jackson	Lifetime
2022	Cynthia Erivo	Genius: Aretha	Aretha Franklin	NatGeo
2022	Thuso Mbedu	The Underground Railroad	Cora Randall	Prime Video
2022	Elizabeth Olsen	WandaVision	Wanda Maximoff	Disney+
2022	Margaret Qualley	Maid	Alex Russell	Netflix
2023
2023	Amanda Seyfried	The Dropout	Elizabeth Holmes	Hulu
2023	Julia Garner	Inventing Anna	Anna Delvey / Anna Sorokin	Netflix
2023	Lily James	Pam & Tommy	Pamela Anderson	Hulu
2023	Amber Midthunder	Prey	Naru	Hulu
2023	Julia Roberts	Gaslit	Martha Mitchell	Starz
2023	Michelle Pfeiffer	The First Lady	Betty Ford	Showtime
2024
2024	Ali Wong	Beef	Amy Lau	Netflix
2024	Kaitlyn Dever	No One Will Save You	Brynn	Hulu
2024	Carla Gugino	The Fall of the House of Usher	Verna	Netflix
2024	Brie Larson	Lessons in Chemistry	Elizabeth Zott	Apple TV+
2024	Bel Powley	A Small Light	Miep Gies	National Geographic
2024	Sydney Sweeney	Reality	Reality Winner	HBO Max
2024	Juno Temple	Fargo	Dorothy "Dot" Lyon	FX
2025
2025	Cristin Milioti	The Penguin	Sofia Falcone / Sofia Gigante / The Hangman	HBO
2025	Cate Blanchett	Disclaimer	Catherine Ravenscroft	Apple TV+
2025	Jodie Foster	True Detective: Night Country	Detective Liz Danvers	HBO
2025	Jessica Lange	The Great Lillian Hall	Lillian Hall	HBO
2025	Phoebe Rae-Taylor	Out of My Mind	Melody Brooks	Disney+
2025	Naomi Watts	Feud: Capote vs. the Swans	Barbara "Babe" Paley	FX
2026
2026	Sarah Snook	All Her Fault	Marissa Irvine	Peacock
2026	Jessica Biel	The Better Sister	Chloe Taylor	Prime Video
2026	Meghann Fahy	Sirens	Devon DeWitt	Netflix
2026	Michelle Williams	Dying for Sex	Molly Kochan	FX on Hulu
2026	Robin Wright	The Girlfriend	Laura Sanderson	Prime Video
2026	Renée Zellweger	Bridget Jones: Mad About the Boy	Bridget Jones	Peacock

== Multiple nominations ==
6 nominations

- Jessica Lange

2 nominations

- Jessica Biel
- Cate Blanchett
- Carrie Coon
- Kaitlyn Dever
- Felicity Huffman
- Michelle Williams

== See also ==
- Golden Globe Award for Best Actress – Miniseries or Television Film
- Primetime Emmy Award for Outstanding Lead Actress in a Limited Series or Movie
- Screen Actors Guild Award for Outstanding Performance by a Female Actor in a Miniseries or Television Movie
