= Kidnapping of Elizabeth Smart =

2002 child-abduction case in the US

- Smart's missing person flyer distributed by the Federal Bureau of Investigation
- Date: June 5, 2002 – March 12, 2003
- Location: Abduction: Salt Lake City, Utah, U.S. Confinement: Salt Lake City, Utah, and San Diego County, California, U.S.
- Type: Kidnapping, child abduction, child rape
- Motive: Sexual abuse
- Perpetrators: Brian Mitchell; Wanda Barzee
- Verdict: Guilty
- Convictions: Various offenses, including kidnapping and child endangerment
- Sentence: Mitchell: Life imprisonment without the possibility of parole; Barzee: 15 years in prison (paroled after 9 years)

The kidnapping of Elizabeth Smart occurred on June 5, 2002, when 14-year-old American girl Elizabeth Ann Smart was kidnapped from her home in Salt Lake City, Utah by Brian David Mitchell.

Mitchell abducted Smart at knifepoint, from a bedroom shared with her younger sister Mary Katherine, who pretended to be asleep out of fear. Mitchell, who claimed to be a religious preacher, was acquainted with the Smart family having worked for them as a handyman. Mitchell and his wife, Wanda Barzee, held Smart captive in a crude campsite on the outskirts of Salt Lake City, and later, in San Diego County, California. Mitchell repeatedly raped her and made threats against Smart and her family. Smart accompanied her captors in public on various occasions dressed head-to-toe in white robes and went largely unrecognized despite contact with the public on several occasions. Her captivity lasted about nine months before police identified her in Sandy, Utah, approximately 18 miles (29 km) from her home.

After her rescue, Smart became an advocate for missing persons and victims of sexual assault. Barzee was sentenced to 15 years in federal prison in 2009 for her role in the abduction, although she was granted early release on September 19, 2018, for previously uncredited time served. Mitchell was diagnosed by forensic psychologists as having antisocial and narcissistic personality disorders. Extensive disputes over his competence to stand trial lasted several years before he was deemed mentally capable in 2010; Mitchell was sentenced to life imprisonment without the possibility of parole in 2011.

== Backgrounds of the kidnappers ==
Brian David Mitchell was born on October 18, 1953, in Salt Lake City, Utah, the third of six children in a family belonging to the Church of Jesus Christ of Latter-day Saints (LDS Church). His mother was a teacher and his father was a social worker. In order to teach Mitchell about sex, his father reportedly showed his adolescent son explicit photos from a medical journal, and, in order to teach him about independence, would drive him to unfamiliar parts of the city, drop him off, and leave him to find his way back home.

At age 16, Mitchell exposed himself to a child and was sent to a juvenile hall. At age 19, he married sixteen-year-old Karen Minor, with whom he had two children. After their divorce, Minor was awarded custody of both children, after which Mitchell temporarily fled with the children to New Hampshire. He resided there for two years, joining a Hare Krishna commune.

Mitchell had a history of drug and alcohol abuse in his adult life but, upon returning to Salt Lake City, he was inspired to seek sobriety by his brother, who had recently returned from an LDS Church mission. In Salt Lake City, Mitchell had two more children with his second wife, Debbie, who herself had three children from a previous marriage. Debbie alleged that Mitchell was abusive during their marriage, and they divorced in 1984. After their separation, Debbie alleged that Mitchell had sexually abused their three-year-old son. The abuse claim could not be medically confirmed, but Mitchell's future visitations with his children were ordered to be supervised by the Division of Child and Family Services. One of Debbie's daughters from her previous marriage would later claim Mitchell had sexually abused her for four years.

On the day his divorce from Debbie was finalized, Mitchell married Wanda Elaine Barzee (b. November 6, 1945, in Salt Lake City), a then-40-year-old divorcée with six children. Barzee had a troubled relationship with her children; one of her daughters would later refer to Barzee as a "monster" who had served a pet rabbit as dinner.

Together, Mitchell and Barzee became actively involved in the LDS Church. Eventually Mitchell began going by the name "Immanuel David Isaiah," claiming to be a prophet of God who experienced visions. The name relates to Mitchell's belief that he was the "Davidic Servant" spoken of in Avraham Gileadi's book The Literary Message of Isaiah. For these unorthodox beliefs and statements, the two were excommunicated from the church in absentia in June 2002. Barzee began going by the name "Hephzibah Eladah Isaiah", and the two would panhandle and preach in downtown Salt Lake City. Mitchell presented himself in an image that was akin to the image of Jesus, dressing in white robes and tunics and growing a beard.

== Abduction ==
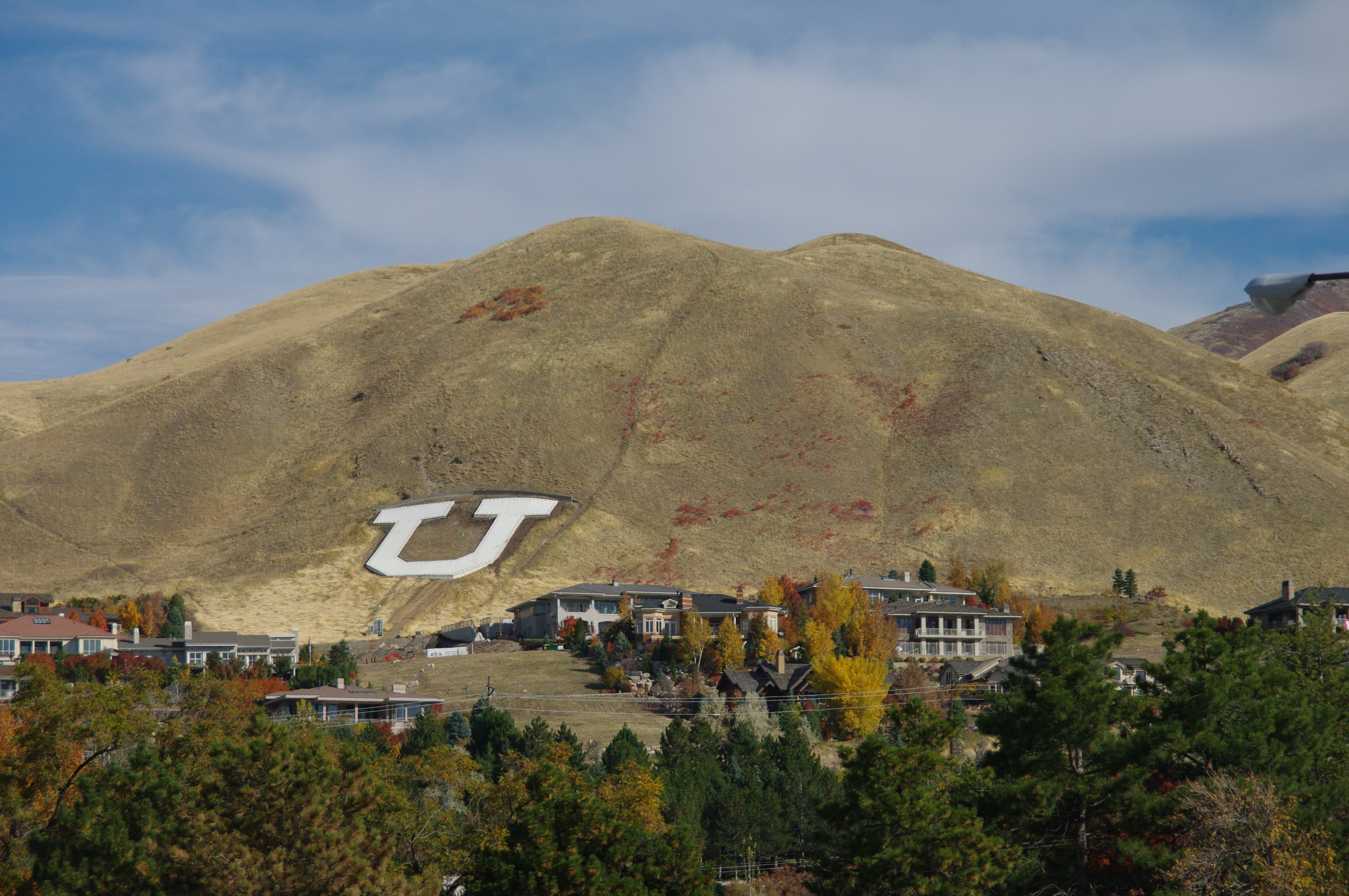
Federal Heights, the neighborhood where Smart resided, and from where she was kidnapped

In the early hours of June 5, 2002, Mitchell broke into the home of Ed and Lois Smart in the Federal Heights neighborhood of Salt Lake City, where they lived with their six children. He abducted fourteen-year-old Elizabeth Smart from the bedroom she shared with her nine-year-old sister, Mary Katherine. Mary Katherine was awakened but pretended to be asleep, and later reported that:

- The man was white, about the height of her brother Charles (5 ft 8 in; 172 cm), about 30 – 40 years of age, and wearing light-colored clothes and a golf hat. (In fact, he was wearing black, did not have a golf hat, and was 48 years of age).
- The man had dark hair, and also had dark hair on his arms and on the backs of his hands.
- The man threatened Elizabeth with a knife (which 9-year-old Mary Katherine thought was a gun at the time).
- She never got a good look at the man's face, a fact kept secret by the police during the investigation.
- When Elizabeth said "ouch" after stubbing her toe on a chair, the man said something that sounded to her like "You better be quiet, and I won't hurt you."
- When her sister Elizabeth asked "Why are you doing this?" the man's reply was not clear to her, but Mary Katherine thought he may have said "for ransom."
- The man was calm and soft-spoken—even polite—and nicely dressed.
- The man's voice seemed somehow familiar to her, despite the fact that he only spoke quietly to her sister Elizabeth throughout. However, Mary was unable to pinpoint the circumstances under which she might have heard his voice before.

When she thought Elizabeth and the abductor had gone, Mary attempted to go to her parents' bedroom, only narrowly avoiding being seen by Mitchell and Elizabeth, who were outside the boys' bedroom. She crept back into her bed, where she hid for an undetermined time—possibly over two hours.

Just before 4:00 a.m. Mary Katherine woke her parents and told them what had happened. Thinking she had been dreaming, her parents did not believe her until they found a window screen that had been cut with a knife.

== Search and investigation ==
On June 6, 2002, Ed and Lois went on television and pleaded for the kidnapper to return their daughter.

A massive regional search effort, organized by the Laura Recovery Center, involved up to 2,000 volunteers each day, as well as dogs and planes. Various websites carried flyers that could be printed or circulated via the internet. After many days of intensive searching, the community-led search was ended and efforts were directed to other means of finding Elizabeth.

Mary Katherine's observations were of little use, and there was little usable evidence found at the scene such as fingerprints or DNA. A search using bloodhounds was unsuccessful. Police questioned and interviewed hundreds of potential suspects including a 26-year-old who was cleared after being located in a West Virginia hospital. The investigation had the side effect of returning several at-large criminals to prison, but Elizabeth was not found.

The Salt Lake City police considered Richard Ricci a person of interest early in the investigation. Ricci was a handyman with a history of drug abuse who had worked for the Smarts; he had been jailed on an unrelated parole violation prior. Ricci died of a brain hemorrhage in August 2002.

To keep Elizabeth's name in the press, her family used a variety of strategies, including making a website about her abduction and providing home videos.

== Captivity ==
After her kidnapping, Mitchell repeatedly told Smart that she was blessed that this was happening to her, and that she should be thankful, though Smart refused to believe him. Mitchell forced Smart to walk four miles in her red pajamas into the woods to an encampment outside of Salt Lake City, where she was met by Wanda Barzee. According to Smart's testimony, Barzee "eventually just proceeded to wash my feet and told me to change out of my pajamas into a robe type of garment. And when I refused, she said if I didn't, she would have Brian Mitchell come rip my pajamas off. I put the robe on. He came and performed a ceremony, which was to marry me to him. After that, he proceeded to rape me many times." Mitchell claimed to be an angel and he also told Smart that he was a Davidic King who would "emerge in seven years, be stoned by a mob, lie dead in the streets for three days and then rise up and kill the Antichrist." Smart, he insisted, was the first of many virgin brides he planned to kidnap, each of whom would accompany him as he battled the Antichrist.

To keep Smart from escaping, she was shackled to a tree with a metal cable around her leg, which allowed her limited mobility outside of the tent she occupied, or hidden in a hole covered by boards. During her captivity, she was forced to take a new name, and she chose the name Esther, after Esther of the Old Testament (Mitchell also called her Shearjashub). It was later revealed during court testimony that Mitchell repeatedly raped Smart, sometimes multiple times a day, forced her to look at pornographic magazines, and regularly threatened to kill her. He often forced her to drink alcohol and take drugs to lower her resistance, and both starved her and fed her garbage. Smart's abuse was facilitated with the assistance of Barzee, whom Smart would later refer to as the "most evil woman" she had ever met.

=== Public appearances ===
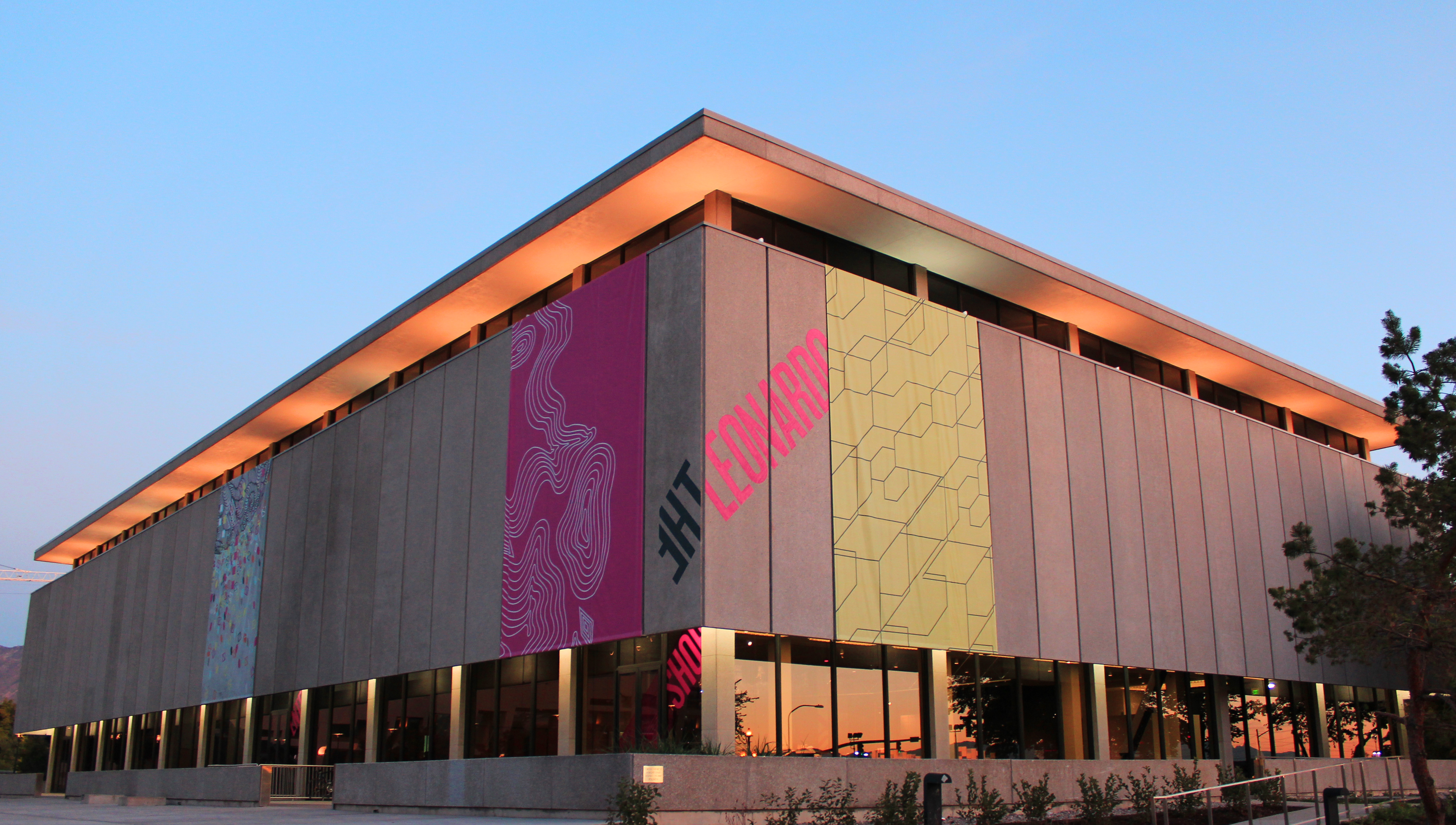
The Salt Lake City Public Library building (The Leonardo museum from 2011 to 2025), one of several public locations where Smart accompanied her captors

Smart accompanied Mitchell and Barzee in public on numerous occasions, but her presence was either obscured or unnoticed via various methods of concealment, which often consisted of her wearing a headscarf and a face veil. In August 2002, around two months after Smart's kidnapping, Mitchell devised a plan to leave Salt Lake City with Barzee and Smart, possibly to Boston or New York City. To research potential places to relocate, Mitchell and Barzee visited the Salt Lake City Public Library with Smart. There, they were noticed by a library patron due to their unusual styles of dress; each wore full-length robes with veils which concealed most of their faces. The patron was convinced to call police after looking closely at Smart's eyes. A police detective arrived at the library and confronted Mitchell, Barzee, and Smart; however, he was deterred by Mitchell, who claimed that Smart was his daughter (named Augustine Marshall), and they were unable to remove their veils or garb on religious grounds. When questioned by the detective, neither Barzee nor Smart spoke, and Mitchell stated that their religion prohibited women from speaking in public. Smart would later say that Barzee signaled her not to move, and she gripped her legs under the table. She later recalled the incident: "I felt like hope was walking out the door. I was mad at myself that I didn't say anything, mad at myself for not taking the chance. So close. I felt terrible that the detective hadn't pushed harder. He just walked away."

Smart also visited grocery stores and a restaurant but went unnoticed. In the fall of 2002, she attended a party with Mitchell and Barzee and was photographed wearing a veil and robe with Mitchell and another party guest.

=== Move to San Diego ===
In September 2002, Mitchell and Barzee left Salt Lake City with Smart, relocating to San Diego County, California, where they held Smart in an encampment in a dry creek bed in Lakeside. Mitchell and Barzee relocated with Smart several times to different encampments in San Diego County, often moving in the middle of the night. On February 12, 2003, Mitchell was arrested in El Cajon for breaking into a church and spent several days in jail over the incident. Smart heard Mitchell and Barzee talking about how they would move to bigger cities, such as New York. Very far from the West of America, she came up with a plan to lie. She went to them and said; “I think we might be supposed to return to Salt Lake, and I know God wouldn’t really speak to me but I know if you were to ask him, he would confirm to you whether or not that was the right path because you truly are his servant and you truly are his prophet.” Mitchell and Barzee were so happy about Smart’s ‘interaction’ with God that they agreed to go back to Salt Lake.

== Discovery ==
In October 2002, Smart's sister Mary Katherine had an epiphany while looking through a Guinness World Record book that the abductor's voice was that of an unemployed man the family knew as Emmanuel, whom the family had hired for a day to work on the roof and rake leaves.

The police were skeptical because of the short time "Emmanuel" had worked for the family, the long time that elapsed, and the short time Mary Katherine had heard the abductor's voice; however, the family had a sketch artist draw "Emmanuel's" face from their descriptions, and in February this drawing was released to the media; it was shown on Larry King Live and America's Most Wanted. The drawing was recognized by relatives of Mitchell, who gave police contemporary photographs of him.

On March 12, 2003, Mitchell was spotted with a woman and a girl in Sandy, Utah, by two separate couples who had seen photos of Mitchell on the news. The woman was Wanda Barzee, and the girl was Elizabeth Smart—disguised in a gray wig, sunglasses, veil, and t-shirt wrapped around her head. Both couples reported their recognition of Mitchell to the Sandy Police Department, which immediately dispatched police officers to the location. When asked, Smart told the officers that her name was Augustine Marshall. However, she was recognized as Elizabeth Smart during questioning by the officers, who then rescued her and arrested Mitchell and Barzee. Even after Smart was separated from Mitchell and Barzee, she insisted her name was Augustine Marshall. Officer Karen Jones handcuffed Smart, according to regulations, and Sergeant Victor Quezada asked again, "Are you Elizabeth?" "Thou sayest," Smart replied.

"Today, Elizabeth was introduced to the AMBER Alert when she asked about a videotape in my office. After watching the coverage, Elizabeth asked why the legislation has not passed when it saves so many children's lives ... I could not give her an answer."

— Section of open letter penned by Ed, Lois and Elizabeth Smart to the United States House of Representatives. March 18, 2003.

One month after the recovery of Elizabeth Smart, the state of Utah superseded the then-existing Rachael Alert with the nationwide Amber alert child abduction alert system—in part to conform with recently implemented nationwide procedures. Although the Rachael Alert was superseded, this system had been a success in the two years of its existence. (Note: The Rachael Alert system was named after a three-year-old named Rachael Runyan, who had been abducted and murdered in 1982. Prior to the implementation of the Rachael Alert child abduction alert system in Utah, her parents had relentlessly campaigned for the implementation of an effective method to alert the public and law enforcement of child abductions and general child safety in Utah. Rachael Alert was formally inaugurated in May 2002)

=== Aftermath ===
Smart was put in a car to be taken to a local police station. While in the car, she began to cry and asked, 'What's going to happen to them [Mitchell and Barzee]? Are they going to be okay?" However, in her 2017 television film I Am Elizabeth Smart, she denied having Stockholm syndrome. She then arrived at the police station, where she was reunited with her family. Once she was back at home, she watched a film, read emails sent by well-wishers, played her harp, met her family's two new dogs, and slept in the same bed Mitchell had taken her from. The next day, her family threw a party to make up for her 15th birthday, which had passed when Smart had still been in captivity. Though she did not attend, she sent a poster board to the party that read "I am the luckiest girl in the world!" That day, Smart painted her nails and opened birthday presents. The same day, she had her hair cut by a family friend.

Smart married Matthew Gilmour in February 2012, after meeting while on a Mormon mission in 2009. They have three children, a daughter born in February 2015, a son born in April 2017, and a daughter born in November 2018. As of 2023, the family lives in Wasatch County, Utah.

== Legal proceedings ==
=== Competency evaluations ===
The court requested that Mitchell undergo a competency evaluation, based on his claims of being a religious prophet. While awaiting the evaluation, Mitchell was incarcerated at the Utah State Hospital. Stephen Golding, a psychologist hired by the defense, distinguished between zealous belief and delusion, and concluded that Mitchell's beliefs transcended zeal and were in fact delusional. It was Golding's opinion that Mitchell was not competent to stand trial as a result of his delusions. The court, however, overruled Golding's opinion and found Mitchell to be competent in 2004. Plea negotiations subsequently began between the defense and the prosecution. The defendant was willing to plead guilty to kidnapping and burglary for a 10- to 15-year sentence on condition that Smart should not testify. The prosecution refused to drop sexual assault charges against Mitchell, and no agreement was reached.

On December 18, 2006, Mitchell was again declared unfit to stand trial in the Utah state courts after screaming at a judge during a hearing to "forsake those robes and kneel in the dust." Doctors had been trying to treat Mitchell without drugs, but prosecutor Kent Morgan said after the scene in court that a request was likely to be made for permission to forcibly administer drugs. On December 12, 2008, it was reported that Mitchell could not legally be forcibly medicated by the State of Utah to attempt to restore his mental competency, also claiming that it is "unnecessary and needlessly harsh," and therefore a violation of the Utah state constitution, to prolong trial proceedings to this length.

In October 2008, Mitchell's case was transferred to the federal United States District Court for the District of Utah. Issues of competency proved to be the crux of the case, and the court held an evidentiary hearing on Mitchell's competency on October 1, 2009, and November 30 through December 11, 2009. On one occasion during a hearing in October, it was reported that Mitchell burst out singing hymns in court. During one of these hearings, Smart described Mitchell as "smart, articulate, evil, wicked, manipulative, sneaky, slimy, selfish, greedy, not spiritual, not religious, not close to God."

Competency evaluations conducted by Noel Gardner, Michael Welner and Richart DeMier were presented at the hearing. Gardner maintained that he believed Mitchell was fully aware of his actions and was attempting to deceive the court. Welner, another witness in the case, reviewed 210 sources and 57 separate interviews including Mitchell, his wife Wanda Barzee, his family, and Elizabeth Smart. The Court credited Welner with presenting a 206-page report. Welner concluded that Mitchell was competent to stand trial, and diagnosed him with non-exclusive pedophilia, antisocial personality disorder, narcissistic personality disorder, malingering and alcohol abuse in a controlled environment. Welner believed that Mitchell was highly manipulative and used his religious expression as a way to coax people into overlooking his high function and dismissing him as delusional. Experts for the defense including Dr. DeMier, a clinical psychologist, did not dispute these diagnoses; they maintained he had a concurrent fixed delusional disorder, believing that Mitchell was mentally ill at the time of the crime, and this greatly impaired his judgment. Mitchell was deemed competent to stand trial on March 1, 2010.

=== Prosecution and sentencing ===
Wanda Barzee eventually pleaded guilty and was sentenced to concurrent terms of 15 years in state and federal prison. However, due to the delays and mental evaluations, it took Mitchell's case almost eight years to come to court.

Mitchell's trial began on November 8, 2010. The defense acknowledged that Mitchell was responsible for the crimes, but contended that he was legally insane at the time of the crime, and should therefore be found not guilty by reason of insanity. The insanity defense for Mitchell was rejected on December 11, 2010, when the jury found him guilty of kidnapping and transporting a minor across state lines with intent to engage in sexual activity. U.S. District Judge Dale A. Kimball sentenced Mitchell to life in prison without the possibility of parole. Mitchell is currently serving his sentence at FCI Lewisburg, a medium-security federal prison in Kelly Township, Pennsylvania.

In 2016, Barzee's federal imprisonment was terminated and she was transferred from the Federal Medical Center, Carswell in Fort Worth, Texas, to the Utah State Prison in Draper, Utah, to begin serving her state prison sentence. She was released in September 2018, which Smart protested.

== Timeline ==
- Oct–Nov 2001 – Approximately seven months prior to the abduction, Elizabeth's mother found Mitchell, calling himself "Emmanuel," begging for change in downtown Salt Lake City, and hired him to repair the family's roof and rake leaves, a job lasting about five hours.

=== Abduction and investigation ===
- June 4, 2002 – The Smart family arrives late at the Bryant Middle School awards function; Elizabeth receives awards in physical fitness and academics but does not play her harp as planned. Family returns home and retires to bed.
- June 5, 2002 – Elizabeth is abducted from her bedroom in the early hours of the morning. Mary Katherine, her sister, is a witness to the crime. Elizabeth is held prisoner at a camp in Dry Creek Canyon, the entrance to which is a short distance from the Smart family house.
- June 6, 2002 – A reward for her rescue is set at $250,000.
- June 7, 2002 – A milkman reports suspicious activities of Bret Michael Edmunds in neighborhood.
- June 9, 2002 – Ed Smart is questioned and polygraphed.
- June 12, 2002 – Manhunt for Bret Michael Edmunds.
- June 14, 2002 – Suspect Richard Ricci is arrested on unrelated charges.
- June 21, 2002 – Bret Michael Edmunds caught at City Hospital in Martinsburg, West Virginia, and questioned the next day.
- June 24, 2002 – Richard Ricci arrest announced.
- July 11, 2002 – Richard Ricci charged with theft in the Smart home. Denies any involvement with Elizabeth's kidnapping.
- July 24, 2002 – Attempted kidnapping at the house of Elizabeth's cousin.
- August 2002 – Salt Lake City Detective Richey, based on a tip, confronts Smart and her kidnappers at the City Library. He is deflected from examining Smart's face by a religious argument. Smart later testified, "I felt like hope was walking out the door", as the detective accepted the argument and left.
- August 2002 – Mitchell, Barzee, and Elizabeth leave Dry Creek Canyon and go to Salt Lake City.
- August 27, 2002 – Richard Ricci collapses.
- August 30, 2002 – Richard Ricci dies of brain hemorrhage.
- September 17, 2002 – Police suspend regular briefings with the Smart family.
- September 27, 2002 – Police arrest Mitchell for shoplifting and later release him.
- September 28, 2002 – Barzee and Elizabeth are spotted in the town of Lakeside, California, in San Diego County.
- October 12, 2002 – Mary Katherine remembers the voice of the kidnapper as that of the man they knew as "Immanuel".
- February 3, 2003 – Smart family releases the sketch of the man known as Immanuel.
- February 12, 2003 – Mitchell is arrested in El Cajon, California, in San Diego County, for breaking into a church. He was not recognized as the criminal wanted in Utah.
- February 15, 2003 – America's Most Wanted features "Immanuel" and requests responses.
- February 16, 2003 – Mitchell's family identifies him to police as the man known as "Immanuel".
- February 17, 2003 – Newly published, more recent photographs of Mitchell made available.
- March 5, 2003 – Mitchell, Barzee, and Elizabeth leave San Diego County, California.
- March 12, 2003 – Elizabeth Smart is found alive in the city of Sandy, Utah.

=== Aftermath ===
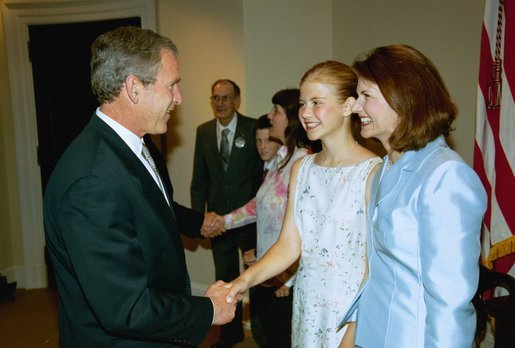
Smart with her mother, Lois, and President George W. Bush at the signing of the PROTECT Act of 2003

- March 18, 2003 – Mitchell and Barzee are charged with aggravated kidnapping, aggravated sexual assault, and aggravated burglary.
- April 30, 2003 – Elizabeth makes her first public appearance after her return.
- October 27, 2003 – Dateline NBC interview with Elizabeth.
- July 26, 2005 – Mitchell declared mentally incompetent to stand trial.
- December 18, 2006 – Mitchell again declared unfit to stand trial.
- April 30, 2008 – Ed Smart appears on Madeleine McCann One Year On.
- November 17, 2008 – People magazine features Elizabeth Smart as one of their heroes of the year. In the article Elizabeth says she plans to live in England next year.
- October 2009 – In a court hearing Elizabeth Smart described Mitchell as "smart, articulate, evil, wicked, manipulative, sneaky, slimy, selfish, greedy, not spiritual, not religious, not close to God."
- November 17, 2009 – Barzee sentenced to 15 years for her role in the kidnapping.
- March 1, 2010 – Mitchell ruled competent to stand trial.
- December 10, 2010 – Mitchell convicted in Smart abduction.
- May 25, 2011 – Mitchell is sentenced to two life sentences in federal prison for the kidnapping of Smart.
- September 11, 2018 – The Utah Board of Pardons and Parole announced Barzee is scheduled to be released on September 19 because the board had failed to give her credit for time served in federal prison.
- September 19, 2018 – After serving nine years in prison 72-year-old Barzee is released from prison. She will be on parole, under federal supervision, for five years. Upon release, she is a registered sex offender (Identification #: 1134472) in the state of Utah.
- December 31, 2018 – Three months after Barzee's release, it is revealed that she is living near a Salt Lake City elementary school. There appear to be no restrictions to how close she can live to a school, though Utah's state rules disallow her from going on school property.
- May 1, 2025 – Barzee is arrested for visiting parks in violation of Utah law restricting sex offender movements.
- 2025 – Mitchell (BOP #15815-081) is moved to FCI-Lewisburg after a prison attack.

== Media ==
=== Television interviews ===
In October 2003, Elizabeth Smart and her parents were interviewed for a special segment of Dateline NBC. The interview, conducted by the Today show's Katie Couric, featured Elizabeth's first interview with any media outlet. Couric questioned Elizabeth's parents about their experiences while Elizabeth was missing, including the Smarts' personal opinions concerning Elizabeth's captors. Couric then interviewed Elizabeth about school and her life following her kidnapping.

Shortly after the Dateline interview, Elizabeth Smart and her family were featured on The Oprah Winfrey Show, where Winfrey questioned the Smarts about the kidnapping.

In July 2006, legal commentator and television personality Nancy Grace interviewed Elizabeth Smart, purportedly to talk about pending legislation on sex-offender registration, but repeatedly asked her for information about her experience. In response to the questioning, Elizabeth told Grace, "I really am here to support the bill and not to go into what, you know, what happened to me." When Grace persisted, asking Elizabeth what it was like to see out of a niqab her abductors forced her to wear, Elizabeth stated: "I'm really not going to talk about this at this time ... and to be frankly honest I really don't appreciate you bringing all this up." Grace did not pursue further questioning about the abduction.

Smart discussed child abductions on the January 22, 2024, season premiere of the rebooted America's Most Wanted with John Walsh and his son Callahan Walsh.

=== Literature ===
The Smart family published a book, Bringing Elizabeth Home (ISBN 978-0385512145). Elizabeth's uncle Tom Smart co-authored a book with Deseret News journalist Lee Benson, titled In Plain Sight, which criticized the investigation process by the Salt Lake City Police Department, as well as noting the media influences that led to her successful recovery.

=== Film depictions ===
The kidnapping was depicted in the 2003 television film The Elizabeth Smart Story, which was directed by Bobby Roth, and based on the book Bringing Elizabeth Home. It starred Amber Marshall as Elizabeth Smart, Dylan Baker and Lindsay Frost as her parents, and Tom Everett as Brian David Mitchell. It was nominated for three Young Artist Awards in 2004. The film first aired on CBS on November 9, 2003, eight months after Elizabeth was found.

In 2017 on the 15th anniversary of her abduction, Lifetime aired the made-for-TV film titled I Am Elizabeth Smart, narrated and produced by Smart, which tells the story of her kidnapping from her own perspective. The film starred Alana Boden as Elizabeth Smart, Skeet Ulrich as Brian David Mitchell, and Deirdre Lovejoy as Wanda Ileen Barzee. Also airing in 2017 was Elizabeth Smart: Autobiography from Biography, a two-hour telefilm.

== See also ==
- List of long-term false imprisonment cases
- List of kidnappings
- List of messiah claimants
- List of solved missing person cases (2000s)
- Child abduction scare of 2002

== Cited works and further reading ==
- Haberman, Maggie; MacIntosh, Jeane (2003). Held Captive: The Kidnapping and Rescue of Elizabeth Smart. Harper Collins. ISBN 978-0-060-58020-9.
- Murphy, Paul (2011). Guide for Implementing Or Enhancing an Endangered Missing Advisory (EMA). Washington: U. S. Department of Justice. ISBN 978-1-437-98383-8.
- Smart, Ed; Smart, Lois; Morton, Laura (2012). Bringing Elizabeth Home: A Journey of Faith and Hope. New York: Doubleday. ISBN 978-1-593-35517-3.
- Smart, Elizabeth; Stewart, Chris (2014). My Story. New York: St. Martin's Griffin. ISBN 978-1-250-05545-3.
- Smart, Tom; Benson, Lee (2005). In Plain Sight: The Startling Truth Behind the Elizabeth Smart Investigation. Chicago: Chicago Review Press. ISBN 1-55652-579-6.
- Williams, Charles (2005). Faces of the Amber Alert. Bloomington, Indiana: Author House. ISBN 978-1-420-86783-1.
