= Elizabeth Smart: Autobiography =

2017 American documentary series

Elizabeth Smart: Autobiography is a 2017 American documentary series about Elizabeth Smart, with her family and law-enforcement officials discussing her 2002 kidnapping and the efforts made to find her. The two-hours, two-part documentary special premiered on November 12, 2017.
