= Anne Openshaw =

Canadian actress

Anne Openshaw is a Canadian actress from Surrey, British Columbia. She is most noted for her recurring role as Alice Fitzpatrick in the television series Call Me Fitz, for which she was a Canadian Screen Award nominee for Best Supporting Actress in a Comedy Series at the 3rd Canadian Screen Awards in 2015.

She had a leading role as Kathleen Ford-McNeal in the 2007 television miniseries Across the River to Motor City, and played Lois Smart in the 2017 television film I Am Elizabeth Smart.

== Filmography ==
=== Film ===
Year	Title	Role	Notes
1995	Dangerous Indiscretion	Girl in Commercial	
1996	Bounty Hunters	Diner waitress	
1997	Bounty Hunters 2: Hardball	Mother	
2002	Narc	Kathryn Calvess	
2005	Fatal Reunion	Nicole Kingsley	
2009	Christmas Crash	Party guest	Uncredited
2010	Blood: A Butcher's Tale	Donna	
2011	The Grey	Ottway's Wife	
2012	Diary of a Wimpy Kid: Dog Days	Mrs. Warren	
2012	American Mary	Mother	
2015	Patterson's Wager	Otter's Mum	
2016	Mostly Ghostly: One Night in Doom House	Realtor	

=== Television ===
Year	Title	Role	Notes
1994	Beyond Betrayal	Anchorwoman	Television film
1997–1998	Breaker High	Ana Mitchell	12 episodes
1998	Cold Squad	Millie	Episode: "Merv Doucette"
1998	First Wave	Lady Lumina	Episode: "Motel California"
1999	Night Man	Hostess	Episode: "Blader"
1999	Ricky Nelson: Original Teen Idol	Kris	Television film
1999	Cold Feet	Snoring Woman	Episode: "Pilot"
1999, 2001	Twice in a Lifetime	Connie / Aliandra Dunne	2 episodes
2000	Earth: Final Conflict	Dr. Denise Kerlew	Episode: "Time Bomb"
2001	Rough Air: Danger on Flight 534	Tracey Nichols	Television film
2002	Mutant X	Angel Dorn	Episode: "Dark Star Rising"
2002	Recipe for Murder	Leona Spencer	Television film
2002	The Chris Isaak Show	Gretchen	Episode: "Isaakland"
2002	Puppets Who Kill	Melissa	Episode: "Rocko's Telethon"
2002	Mary Higgins Clark's: We'll Meet Again	Jenna Whitehall	Television film
2003	Just Cause	Martha Gaines	Episode: "Reasonable Doubts"
2004	A Beachcombers Christmas	Leanne	Television film
2005	Secret Lives	Randi	Television film
2005	Captive Hearts	Tasha Simmons	Television film
2005	Stargate Atlantis	Daedalus Pilot	3 episodes
2005	Reunion	Lucy Stevens	Episode: "1993"
2005	Criminal Intent	Kate, 911 Operator	Television film
2006	Supernatural	Kate	Episode: "Dead Man's Blood"
2007	Blood Ties	Isabel	Episode: "Love Hurts"
2007	Across the River to Motor City	Kathleen Ford-McNeal	6 episodes
2008	Smallville	Vanessa Webber	Episode: "Sleeper"
2010	Lies Between Friends	Wendy Heaton	Television film
2011	A Trusted Man	Annie	Television film
2011, 2012	The Haunting Hour: The Series	Mom / Jack's Mom	3 episodes
2012	Continuum	News Anchor	Episode: "Matter of Time"
2012	The Eleventh Victim	Melissa Everett	Television film
2013	Psych	Brianna Hicks	Episode: "Nip and Suck It"
2013	Call Me Fitz	Alice Fitzpatrick	3 episodes
2015	iZombie	Mom-Type	Episode: "Even Cowgirls Get the Black and Blues"
2015	Just in Time for Christmas	Cindy	Television film
2016	Date with Love	Catherine Rogers	Television film
2016	Garage Sale Mystery	Operator	Episode: "The Novel Murders"
2017	Summer in the Vineyard	Chef Jane	Television film
2017	I Am Elizabeth Smart	Lois Smart	Television film
