= Stephan Chase =

British actor (1945–2019)

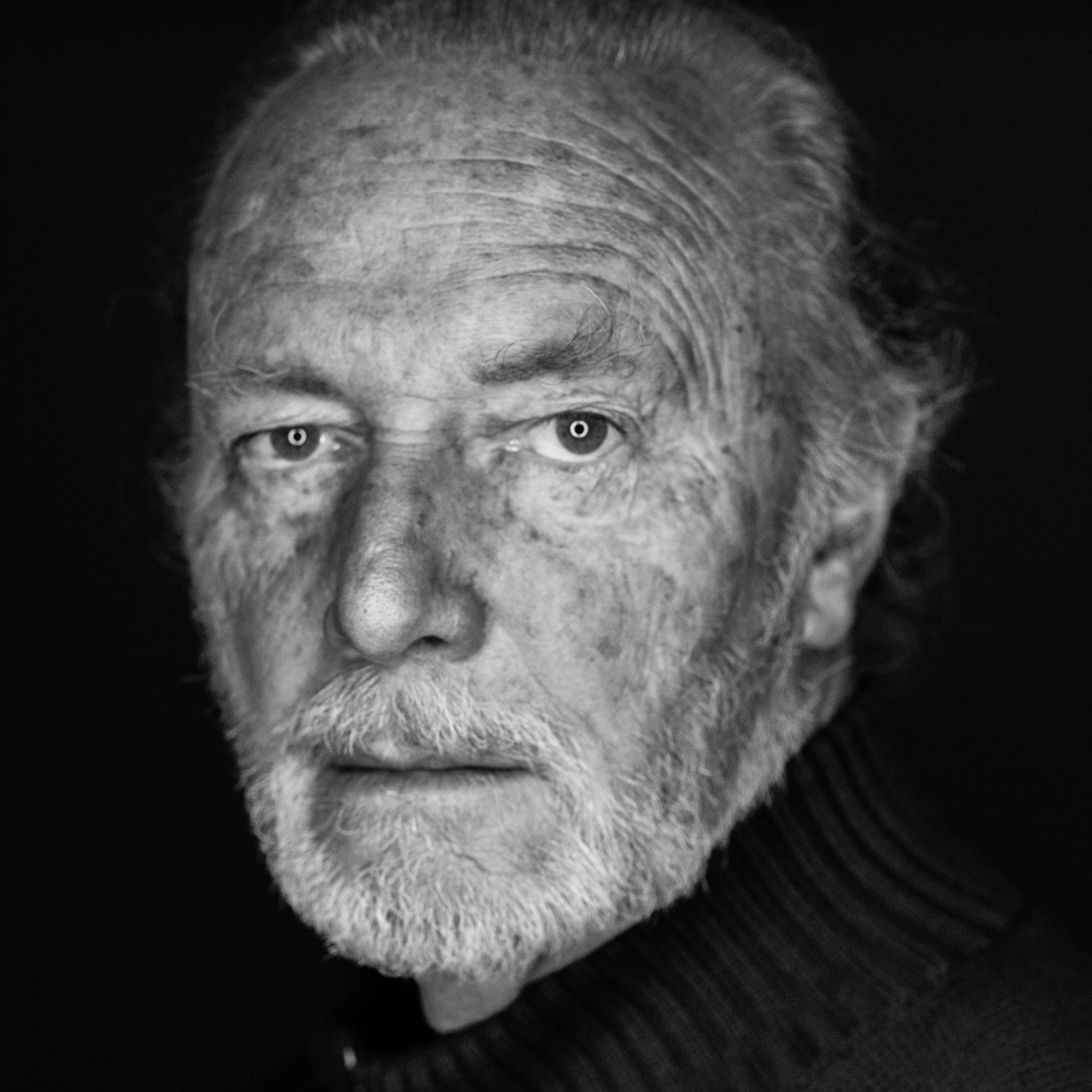
- Chase in 2013
- Born: 8 February 1945
- Died: 27 June 2019 (aged 74); London, England
- Occupations: Actor, Director, Coach
- Years active: 1968–2019

Stephan Chase (born Stephan de Montaignac; 8 February 1945 - 27 June 2019) was a British actor of Cornish and Scots descent. He was educated in Ireland and England. Before joining the Royal Shakespeare Company, he won a scholarship and trained at the Royal Academy of Dramatic Art (RADA) later becoming an Associate of RADA.

He played Hamlet in 1975 in a British Council / Regent's Park Open Air Theatre touring production in India and Ceylon. He appeared as a leading man in feature films, TV plays and series and the West End theatre, such as Rules of the Game (1982), directed by Anthony Quayle, until he founded and ran the Rhubarb Agency 1988–2005. During this time, Chase also worked as an audio producer and director. He subsequently worked as a teacher and coach in London, but in 2011 he began working as an actor again.

He died on 27 June 2019 in London at the age of 74.

== Filmography ==
=== Film ===
- Cry of the Banshee (1970, Dir. Gordon Hessler) - Sean Whitman
- Macbeth (1971, Dir. Roman Polanski) - Malcolm
- The Incredible Sarah (1976, Dir. Richard Fleischer)
- The Golden Lady (1979, Dir. José Ramón Larraz) - Max Rowlands
- Nijinsky (1980, Dir. Herbert Ross) - Adolph Bolm
- Al-mas' Ala Al-Kubra (1983, Dir. Mohamed Shukri Jameel) - Army Captain
- White Mischief (1987, Dir. Michael Radford) - Carberry
- The Child (2012, Short, Dir. Amy Neil)
- Trained (2013, Dir. Anthony Jerjen, Winner LA Film Festival, Honolulu Film Festival and selected for London Raindance Film Festival 2013) - Robert
- Maleficent (2014, Dir. Robert Stromberg (with Angelina Jolie) - General
- The Hooligan Factory (2014, Dir. Nick Nevern) - The Governor
- The Earth Belongs To No-One (2014, Short, dir. Ani Laurie; producer Rienkje Attoh) (Nominated for Best Short Film at the 2015 Raindance Film Festival) - Farmer Joseph
- Francis (2014, dir. Paul Alexander. Production Company: A Little Portion Production) - Pope Innocent III
- The Wager (2015, Short) - Harry
- Finding Saint Francis (2015, Dir. Paul Alexander) - Pietro Bernadone, Mayor of Assisi
- The Carer (2016, Dir. Christine Templeton-Parker) - Neville

=== Television ===
- UFO (1970, Episode: "Mindbender") - Film Director
- Wives and Daughters (1971) - Osborne Hamley
- Arthur of the Britons (1972) - Horgren
- The Edwardians (1972) - Kearey
- Orson Welles Great Mysteries (1973, Episode: "Death of an Old-Fashioned Girl") - Paul Zachary
- The Zoo Gang (1974) - Raoul
- The Professionals (1977) - Dapper
- Famous Five (1978) - Perton
- Secret Army (1979, Prod Gerard Glaister) - Captain Stephen Durnford / Stephen Durnford
- The Talisman (1980, Prod Barry Letts) - Richard I of England
- Take Three Women (1982) - Joe
- Black Arrow (1985, TV Movie, Dir. John Hough) - Black Arrow
- Florence Nightingale (1985, TV Movie, Dir. Daryl Duke proposed for Emmy Nomination for Dr.Sutherland) - Dr. Sutherland
- Dempsey and Makepeace (1986) - Edwards
- A Ghost in Monte Carlo (1990, TV Movie) - Deal
- The Governor (1995) - Architect Richard Greenleaves

== Theatre ==
- The musical, Katie Mulholland (1983 as Bernard Rosier, by Catherine Cookson DBE Dir Ken Hill (playwright))
- The Teddy Bears' Picnic (1987 by David Pinner, Dir Philip Partridge)
- Liberty Oregon (1994 as Novitski, at the Edinburgh Festival Dir Natasha Carlish)
- Suddenly Last Summer (1996 as Cucrovitz, by Tennessee Williams)
