= Alana Boden =

English actress (born 1997)

- Born: Alana Evie Boden; 1997 (age 28–29); Surrey, England
- Occupation: Actress
- Years active: 2011–present

Alana Evie Boden (born 1997) is an English actress. She was nominated for a Critics' Choice Award for her performance in the Lifetime film I Am Elizabeth Smart (2017).

== Early life ==
Boden was born in Surrey and grew up in Hampshire. She has two sisters. She began her career as a child model when she was nine before moving into television commercials and short films. She was homeschooled to make time for her career.

== Career ==
Boden made her television debut as Beatrice Selfridge in the second and third series of the ITV period drama Mr Selfridge. She won the Rising Star award at the 2016 London Short Film Festival for her performance in the drama The Earth Belongs to No One. That same year, she starred as Elaine Wiltshire in the Canadian YTV series Ride about an equestrian school in England.

In 2017, Boden played a young version of the titular person Elizabeth Smart in the Lifetime biographical film I Am Elizabeth Smart, for which Boden was nominated for Best Actress in a Television Movie or Limited Series at the following year's Critics' Choice Awards.

Boden appeared in the films Hostage Radio and Infamous Six. In 2022, she stars in Flowers in the Attic: The Origin, a Lifetime miniseries prequel based on the novel Garden of Shadows. Also that year, she appeared in the films Uncharted and The Invitation. She was initially cast in the film Tarot (working title Horrorscope).

== Filmography ==
=== Film ===
Year	Title	Role	Notes
2014	Spiritual Contact: The Movie	Jennifer	
2015	The Earth Belongs to No One	Sky	Short film
2015	Brash Young Turks	Python Agent	
2019	Hostage Radio	Julia	
2020	Infamous Six	Cola	
2022	Uncharted	Zoe	
2022	The Invitation	Lucy	
2025	A Working Man	Nina	
2025	Heavyweight	Charlotte	

=== Television ===
Year	Title	Role	Notes
2014–2015	Mr Selfridge	Beatrice Selfridge	3 episodes (series 2–3)
2015	Doctors	Lucy Whiteside	Episode: "Plus One"
2015	Humans	Caroline	1 episode
2016	Wolfblood	Niamh / Holly	2 episodes
2016	Ride	Elaine Wiltshire	Main role
2017	I Am Elizabeth Smart	Young Elizabeth Smart	Television film
2018	Hawaii Five-0	Lady Sophie	Episode: "Ahuwale Ka Nane Huna"
2018	Origin	Ayko	Web series; episode: "Remember Me"
2020	Alex Rider	Fiona Friend	1 episode
2021	Domina	Porcia	Episode: "Treason"
2022	Flowers in the Attic: The Origin	Alicia Foxworth	Miniseries
2024	Geek Girl	Miss Lord	6 episodes

== Stage ==
- The Tempest (2011), as Spirit, at Edinburgh Fringe Festival

== Awards and nominations ==
Year	Award	Category	Work	Result	Ref
2016	London Short Film Festival	Rising Star	The Earth Belongs to No One	Won	
2018	Critics' Choice Awards	Best Actress in a Television Movie or Limited Series	I Am Elizabeth Smart	Nominated	
