= London International Animation Festival =

UK film festival

- Location: London, England
- Founded: 2003; 23 years ago
- Language: English
- Website: www.liaf.org.uk

The London International Animation Festival is an annual animation festival founded in 2003 that takes place at the Barbican Centre in London in November and December. The annual 10-day Festival includes premieres, retrospectives, interviews with filmmakers, workshops, and a "Best of the Festival" screening.

== Awards ==
Awards include:

- Best of the Festival Award
- Best British Film Award
- Best Sound Design Award
- Best Abstract Film Award

In 2025 the LIAF will take place from 28 November - 7 December 2025. The festival director is Nag Vladermersky.

== See also ==
- BFI London Film Festival
- London Independent Film Festival
- London Short Film Festival
- UK Film Festival
