= Murder of Rachael Runyan =

Unsolved murder

Rachael Runyan
- Runyan as the Little Miss Sunset child beauty queen in 1981
- Born: Rachael Marie Runyan; June 23, 1979; Ogden, Utah, U.S.
- Disappeared: August 26, 1982; Doxey Elementary School playground, Sunset, Utah, U.S. 41.1282°N 112.0271°W
- Died: August 26, 1982 (aged 3)
- Body discovered: September 19, 1982 in Mountain Green, Utah, U.S.
- Resting place: Washington Heights Memorial Park, Ogden, Weber County, U.S. 41.1785°N 111.9700°W (approximate)
- Known for: Victim of unsolved child murder Rachael Alert; AMBER Alert
- Parents: Jeff Runyan (father); Elaine Runyan (mother)

The murder of Rachael Runyan is an unsolved child murder which occurred in Sunset, Utah, on August 26, 1982, when a three-year-old girl was abducted from a playground and murdered by an unknown individual. Her body was found three weeks later in a creek bed in nearby Morgan County.

One of Utah's most notorious cold cases, Rachael's murder ultimately proved a catalyst to establish the "Rachael Alert" child abduction alert system, which remained in use in the state of Utah until 2003, when the state adopted the national AMBER alert child abduction emergency alert system.

The abduction and murder of Rachael Runyan was a factor in the 1983 passage of the US Congressional Missing Children's Act, which mandated an allocation of additional resources for the investigation of ongoing missing children cases.

In 2017, the Rachael Runyan Missing and Exploited Children's Day was signed into legislation in Utah. The purpose of the annual observance is to raise public awareness of missing and exploited children within the state; the annual awareness date is August 26, the date of Rachael's abduction. Runyan's abduction and murder remain unsolved.

== Background ==
Rachael Marie Runyan was born on June 23, 1979, in Weber County, Utah, the second child and only daughter of Jeff and Elaine Runyan. She had an older brother, Justin, and a younger brother, Nathan.

The Runyan family had moved to Sunset from Tennessee just before Rachael's birth; her mother later recalled she and her husband believed Sunset—then a community of 6,000 inhabitants—would be a "wonderful and safe place" to raise their children. Rachael was a child beauty queen, having been crowned "Little Miss Sunset" the year before her murder. She has been described by her mother as a well-behaved child who, often being too young to participate in playground games with Justin and other children, was content to simply sit aside and suck her thumb watching the other children play. This habit had led to her mother occasionally teasing Rachael that she would become "bucktoothed" as an adult, to which Rachael would simply giggle. Despite the sense of security Jeff and Elaine Runyan felt within the community of Sunset, both parents repeatedly warned their children of the dangers of trusting anybody they did not know who attempted to lure them from their home or any safe environment.

The family lived in a modest home adjacent to the Doxey Elementary School playground. A park the three children were fond of where they regularly played, Mitchell Park, was also near their home. During the summer of 1982, Jeff and Elaine Runyan installed a gate in their backyard fence, so the family could easily access this playground.

== Abduction ==
In the late morning of August 26, 1982, Rachael Runyan and her five-year-old brother Justin asked their mother if they and their younger brother Nathan, aged 18 months, could play in the playground of Doxey Elementary School. Although Elaine Runyan had never allowed her children to play unsupervised anywhere outside the family home, because she was preparing lunch for her children when they made the request, and the school playground was just 15 feet (4.6 m) from her home, well within sight of her kitchen window, she agreed to it. Nonetheless, Runyan looked repeatedly out the kitchen window and conversed with her children as she prepared the meal.

When Elaine called her children to come home for lunch at approximately 12:55 p.m., only Nathan and Justin returned home. Justin blurted out to her that Rachael had been taken from the park by force moments before by a young black man who had initially offered to buy her ice cream and bubble gum at a nearby supermarket. According to Justin, the man had approached them as they played in the sandpit, attempting to lure the siblings into his car with an offer to purchase candy for the trio. When they were close to the man's car, Rachael told him she liked bubble gum flavored ice cream. The man claimed to have this flavor of ice cream in his car. Justin said that when he warned Rachael not to accompany the man any further, she began to turn and walk away from him. In response, the man simply picked Rachael up and placed her over his shoulder before bundling her, screaming, into his car as Justin stood frozen in fear with Nathan standing by his side.

Elaine rushed to the supermarket the kidnapper had mentioned, repeatedly asking staff and shoppers: "Have you seen a little blond girl? A 3-year-old with a black man?" Nobody she encountered had seen her child. Approximately 20 minutes after her daughter's disappearance, Elaine reported Rachael's abduction to the Sunset Police Department.

=== Investigation ===
Immediately upon learning of Rachael's abduction, the Sunset Police Department set up roadblocks in and around the city. This tactic failed to help police apprehend the suspect or to recover Rachael. In the hours following her abduction, a task force consisting of ten law enforcement investigators was formed to investigate the child's disappearance. These investigators were recruited from several Utah counties and supervised by Sheriff Brant Johnston. (Note: This task force would later be assisted by the FBI following the September 19 discovery of Rachael's body.)

Both Justin Runyan and a 10-year-old kid who had also been approached by the man at the playground, described him to investigators as being a light-complexioned African-American, aged between 30 and 35 years old, 6 feet (1.8 m) tall with a medium build, an afro-style haircut, and a handlebar mustache. He drove an older model four-door dark-blue car with wood-grain stripes along the sides. The man had been at Mitchell Park, talking to various children and drinking coffee for a minimum of 15 minutes before abducting Rachael. Investigators also discovered this individual had played with the three Runyan children for several minutes before they had accompanied him partway to his vehicle.

Although eyewitness memory enabled police to obtain an accurate physical description of the child's abductor from which they were able to construct a detailed composite drawing, the only witnesses to Rachael's abduction had been the three children. No CCTV had captured her abduction from the school grounds. As such, beyond police and media appeals, subsequent law enforcement efforts were effectively limited to procedures like forensic searches of the crime scene and house-to-house inquiries in the hours and days after the event. (Note: In the days immediately following Rachael's abduction, police across Utah conducted several public seminars educating Utah parents on methods to protect their children from potential abduction or harm from strangers.)

Public appeals for information about Rachael's disappearance did lead to investigators receiving multiple leads both in relation to the whereabouts of the child and the possible identity of her abductor. Although all leads were vigorously pursued they ultimately proved fruitless.

=== Family efforts and media appeals ===
With assistance from an assembled neighborhood committee (many of whom donated money to an improvised family search effort), the Runyan family began its own efforts to search for Rachael. Both the family and neighborhood volunteers had limited means and methods for the search at their disposal, although a nationwide distribution of flyers displaying Rachael's picture was organized. With the assistance of friends and neighbors, the Runyan family searched local neighborhoods and distributed thousands of missing person posters and flyers alerting the public to Rachael's disappearance. Within three weeks, this initiative had cost the family $10,000 in postage expenses alone.

A week after Rachael's abduction, her parents flew to New York to attend a press conference intended to maintain the extensive publicity surrounding their daughter's disappearance. At this press conference, Jeff Runyan said: "I feel [the abductor] is without conscience, and my plea is for someone who knows him to come forward and sell him out." Acknowledging the possibility Rachael might have been sold following her abduction, Elaine Runyan urged all parents planning on adopting a little girl in the near future to ensure the child was not Rachael.

On September 3, Rachael's parents appeared on the Today show to continue to publicize her disappearance. They offered a $20,000 reward raised largely through donations from concerned citizens in their community. The city of Sunset also pledged an additional $20,000 for the child's safe return.

== Discovery ==
At 5:00 p.m. on September 19, a family traveling on a mountain road in Mountain Green, Utah (approximately 50 miles (80 km) from Sunset) stopped their vehicle at a turnout close to Trapper's Loop Road to let their children play at a nearby stream and throw rocks into the water. Close to a pile of brush, the children observed what they initially believed was a doll, partly covered in shrubbery floating at the edge of the stream. On closer inspection, the children realized the doll was actually the nude body of a female toddler with her hands bound behind her back.

Rachael's relatives were able to offer tentative identification of her body from a chipped tooth and piercings in her ears. Due to the advanced state of the body's decomposition, the precise cause of Rachael's death was never established. The coroner was unable to exclude smothering as the cause of death.

=== Funeral ===
Shortly after the formal identification of their daughter, Jeff and Elaine Runyan held Rachael's funeral service at the Sunset Stake Center. Over 300 mourners were in attendance. Rachael was laid to rest in Washington Heights Memorial Park in the city of Ogden, Utah. She was buried in a white casket adorned with her photograph, a single pink rosebud, and one of her favorite Raggedy Ann dolls. Rachael's gravestone is inscribed with the words: "She brought a nation to its knees."

== Federal impact ==
The abduction and murder of Rachael Runyan proved to be a major factor in the October 1982 passage of a federal law allowing the parents of missing children access to a clearinghouse administered by the Federal Bureau of Investigation (FBI), which would obtain and file records of the fingerprints and blood types of more than 300,000 Utah children.

As a result of this abduction and murder, the state of Utah also formally implemented the "Rachael Alert" child abduction alert system in April 2002. It was designed to alert residents statewide of active child abduction and missing children cases. Once law enforcement personnel verified the authenticity of a child abduction case, a "Rachael Alert" form was faxed to all television and radio networks for immediate and high-priority statewide broadcast. The criteria to be met in these cases included: the missing child was a minor or mentally handicapped; that they were in imminent danger; that the disappearance was not a runaway situation; and that law enforcement had a complete and accurate physical description of the missing child. (Note: Prior to the 2002 implementation of the "Rachael Alert" child abduction alert system, Jeff and Elaine Runyan had campaigned relentlessly for the implementation of an effective method to alert the public and law enforcement alike of child abductions. The "Rachael Alert" child abduction alert system was formally inaugurated on April 2, 2002.)

The "Rachael Alert" system was only used in the June 2002 abduction of Elizabeth Smart and the January 2003 abduction of 3-month-old Nicholas Triplett; both children were ultimately found alive. In the wake of Elizabeth Smart's subsequent safe recovery, 41 states implemented the AMBER Alert child abduction alert system. Utah replaced the "Rachael Alert" system with the AMBER Alert system in April 2003—primarily to conform with nationwide standards. The AMBER Alert system is now tested twice a year in Utah— on January 13 and on the anniversary of Rachael's abduction, August 26. (Note: The current criteria for issuing an AMBER Alert in the state of Utah is simply that the missing person is under the age of 18; the original criteria prior to April 2003 had included individuals with a proven physical or mental disability.)

Rachael's murder was also a factor in the passing of the Missing Children's Act, which places descriptions of missing children in the FBI's National Crime Information Computer database.

== Ongoing investigation ==
=== Reopening of case ===
Although Rachael's murder is an unsolved case, Lieutenant Phil Olmstead, who first answered Elaine Runyan's frantic call for assistance following her daughter's abduction, continually assured the Runyan family of the Sunset Police Department's determination to find Rachael's murderer or murderers. (Note: Phil Olmstead would eventually become Chief of the Sunset Police Department, taking charge of the overall investigation into Rachael's abduction and murder.) The investigation into her murder was officially reopened by the Sunset Police Department in 2007. Police continue working closely with the Utah Attorney General's office in their efforts to apprehend and convict the perpetrator(s). A reward of $58,000 is available should any information leading to the arrest and subsequent conviction of the person or persons responsible be provided to authorities.

Hopes for the identification of the perpetrator rest primarily on notable advances in forensic technology in the years since 1982. As a means to this end, investigators have not ruled out the possibility of exhuming Rachael's body to retrieve further forensic evidence.

DNA testing conducted on items found near Rachael's body in 2007 yielded tentative results, although they have not helped advance the investigation. Rachael's family has never given up hope her killer will be found.

=== Suspects ===
In 2012, investigators announced that a prison inmate in Pennsylvania who had been a resident of Sunset in 1982 was under active investigation. Although no formal charges have been filed against this individual, he is considered a possible suspect in Rachael's abduction and murder. Another potential suspect is a man with a criminal record who is believed to live in New Mexico. Sunset Police Chief Ken Eborn has said that evidence supporting the potential guilt of this suspect exists, but it is insufficient for police to make a formal arrest. Furthermore, Eborn has said he is convinced that witnesses or individuals with knowledge of the man's guilt are reluctant to come forward to authorities—possibly because of death threats he has made against them.

== Advocacy and legacy ==
"Though it has been 23 years since Rachael's abduction, we still do not forget ... we are still figuring out ways to find our missing children. The fight goes on."

— Elaine Runyan-Simmons, mother of Rachael Runyan, reflecting on collective efforts to raise public awareness of child abduction and child safety both in Utah and nationwide, 2005.

Following her daughter's abduction and murder, Elaine Runyan-Simmons channeled her grief into action, becoming an outspoken advocate in a national movement to raise awareness of issues regarding child safety, child abduction, and the legislated procedures regarding their recovery. Runyan-Simmons has frequently offered emotional support, guidance and advice to parents undergoing a similar experience to her family's ordeal.

Regarding her ongoing commitment to the perpetuation and expansion of Utah's "Rachael Alert" child abduction alert system (which was subsumed under the nationwide AMBER alert system in 2003), Runyan-Simmons has said that being a voice in this field of advocacy is not a choice she would have made had Rachael not been abducted and murdered: the events of August and September 1982 left her with little choice in this matter. In 2013, Runyan-Simmons stated: "It's a legacy I leave for my daughter. If there was something in place like this [in 1982], maybe we'd still have her." (Note: Approximately 80% of child abductions in America occur within one mile of the child's family home.)

In May 2016, the park where Rachael was abducted was renamed Rachael Runyan Memorial Park. It was formally dedicated to Rachael's memory on August 26; a memorial stone bearing an image of the girl, a brief summary of her story, and the park's name stands within its grounds. The inscription on the stone reads: "In honor of Rachael Marie Runyan, June 23, 1979 - August 26, 1982. Abducted from Doxey Elementary Playground August 26, 1982." (Note: Elaine Runyan-Simmons has said she hopes the story of her daughter's abduction and murder will serve as an educational tool for other parents and their children, adding that she hopes this park becomes "a place [parents] can bring their children and educate them.")

The Rachael Runyan Missing and Exploited Children's Day was signed into legislation in Utah in March 2017. The stated aim of this annual observance is to encourage individuals in Utah to prioritize child safety. The bill was inspired by Rachael Runyan, and has been described as a "catalyst for the development of better responses to (child) abduction" within Utah. In instances where an AMBER Alert is implemented and the missing child is subsequently found safe and well, a "Rachael Runyan Award" is presented to the individual who either locates the missing child or initially alerted authorities to his or her abduction. (Note: Between 2003 and 2010, AMBER alerts issued across the United States directly contributed to the safe recovery of 518 abducted children.)

== Media ==
=== Television ===
- The murder of Rachael Runyan is featured in an episode of the true crime series Unsolved Mysteries. Commissioned and broadcast by NBC, this episode was first aired on November 8, 1989, and features an interview with Rachael's mother, Elaine. This episode includes the suggestion Rachael may have been abducted and later murdered in the making of a snuff film.

=== Books ===
- Thompson, Emily G. (2017). Unsolved Child Murders: Eighteen American Cases, 1956–1998. North Carolina: Exposit. ISBN 978-1-476-67000-3.
- Williams, Charles (2005). Faces of the Amber Alert. Bloomington, Indiana: AuthorHouse. ISBN 978-1-420-86783-1.

=== Podcast ===
- The podcast series The Murder In My Family has broadcast a 45-minute episode focusing on the abduction and murder of Rachael Runyan and the ongoing effect her loss continues to have on her family. This episode was initially broadcast in August 2018.

== See also ==
- Amber alert
- Child abduction
- Child abuse
- Cold case
- Crime in Utah
- List of kidnappings (1980–1989)
- List of murdered American children
- List of solved missing person cases (1980s)
- List of unsolved murders (1980–1999)

== Cited works and further reading ==
- Fisher, Bonnie S.; Lab, Steven P. (2010). Encyclopedia of Victimology and Crime Prevention. Los Angeles: Sage Publishing. ISBN 978-1-412-96047-2.
- Jeffers, H. Paul (1991). Profiles In Evil: Chilling Case Histories From the Files of the FBI's Violent Crime Unit. London: Warner Books. ISBN 978-0-70885449-5.
- Lauder, Ronald (1985). Fighting Violent Crime In America. Michigan: Dodd Mead. ISBN 978-0-396-08495-2.
- Murphy, Paul (2011). Guide for Implementing or Enhancing an Endangered Missing Advisory (EMA). Washington: U. S. Department of Justice. ISBN 978-1-437-98383-8.
- Ressler, Robert (1993). Whoever Fights Monsters. Sydney: Simon & Schuster. ISBN 0-671-71561-5.
- Smart, Tom; Benson, Lee (2005). In Plain Sight: The Startling Truth Behind the Elizabeth Smart Investigation. Chicago: Chicago Review Press. ISBN 1-55652-579-6.
- Smart, Ed; Smart, Lois; Morton, Laura (2012). Bringing Elizabeth Home: A Journey of Faith and Hope. New York: Doubleday. ISBN 978-1-593-35517-3.
- Thompson, Emily G. (2017). Unsolved Child Murders: Eighteen American Cases, 1956–1998. North Carolina: Exposit. ISBN 978-1-476-67000-3.
- Williams, Charles (2005). Faces of the Amber Alert. Bloomington, Indiana: Author House. ISBN 978-1-420-86783-1.
