= London Independent Film Festival =

British film festival since 2004

- London Independent Film Festival
- Location: London
- Founded: 2004
- Language: English
- Website: liff.org

The London Independent Film Festival is a British film festival that takes place annually in April. It was founded by Erich Schultz and specialises in low-budget independent films. It offers a screenplay competition and distribution fair.

== History ==
Founded in 2004, the London Independent Film Festival provides a showcase for over 100 independent films, presented over a two-week period in April at Genesis Cinema (London).

== Awards ==
Awards submissions are made through the online portal Film Freeway, and open in October, closing in February of the following year. Fees range from £65 for feature films to £25 for short shorts.

Awards categories include:

- Best Low-budget Feature (over £100k)
- Best Micro-budget Feature (under £100k)
- Best No-Budget Feature (under £10k)
- Best UK Feature
- Best Documentary
- Best Sci-Fi / Horror Feature
- Best Female Director Feature
- Best LGBT film
- Best Short Film
- Best UK Short
- Best Short Documentary
- Best Animated Short
- Best Experimental Short
- Best Short Short
- Best Horror / Sci-Fi Short
- Best Music Video

== See also ==
- BFI London Film Festival
- London International Animation Festival
- London Short Film Festival
- UK Film Festival
