= The Earth Belongs to No One =

The Earth Belongs To No One is a 2015 British short drama film directed, produced and written by Ani Laurie, and co-written with Greek screenwriter Katerina Giannakou.

The short stars Jessica Barden and Alana Boden. It was nominated for Best UK Short film at the 2015 Raindance Film Festival. It has been nominated for numerous awards, picking up picking up the Rising Star Performance Award on 8 January 2016 at London Short Film Festival. The Earth Belongs To No One received notable acclaim for Best storytelling nomination at Chicago International Film Festival, Special Mention for its subtle storytelling.

The Earth Belongs To No One was director Ani Laurie's graduation short film at The National Film and Television School.

== Plot ==
On her way back home from school, 14-year-old Sky is followed home by a gang, the rest is a blur. Her big sister Jessy-May takes matters into her own hands.

== Location ==
Filmed in the iconic estate, Park Hill Estate. A symbolic grade two listed building recognised for the major shift in newly gentrified British estates and social cleansing.

== Filmmaker ==
Ani Laurie is a writer/director graduate of The National Film & Television School. She was awarded the Toledo Scholarship in 2014 and 2015 by

Duncan Kenworthy, notable British producer and founder of Toledo Productions.

== Cast ==
- Jessica Barden as Jessy-Mary
- Alana Boden as Sky
- Stephan Chase as Farmer Joseph

== Themes ==
Neorealism. Drama.

== Film title ==
The Earth Belongs To No One is a title inspired by Jean-Jacques Rousseau popular quote: ''..''You are undone if you once forget that the fruits of the earth belong to us all, and the earth itself to nobody."
