= I Am Elizabeth Smart =

2017 television film

- Teleplay by: Tory Walker
- Directed by: Sarah Walker
- Starring: Skeet Ulrich; Deirdre Lovejoy; George Newbern; Anne Openshaw; Alana Boden
- Narrated by: Elizabeth Smart
- Music by: Alies Sluiter
- Country of origin: United States
- Original language: English

Production
- Executive producers: Allison Berkley; Joseph Freed; Jonathan Koch; Steven Michaels
- Producer: Elizabeth Smart
- Running time: 87 minutes
- Production companies: Asylum Entertainment; Marwar Junction Productions

Original release
- Network: Lifetime
- Release: November 18, 2017

I Am Elizabeth Smart is a 2017 American crime television film that aired on Lifetime that detailed the kidnapping of Elizabeth Smart. The film features Elizabeth Smart as the narrator and stars Alana Boden, Skeet Ulrich, Deirdre Lovejoy, George Newbern, and Anne Openshaw. Smart's wraparound narration in the film was used to interrupt the events she endured, preventing the viewers from distancing themselves from the action.

On January 14, 2018, a "Special Edition" of the TV movie was released, featuring interviews with Elizabeth Smart, Skeet Ulrich, and Deirdre Lovejoy. Smart watched the film once, and found the finished product so accurate that she did not want to watch it again.

== Plot ==
Elizabeth Smart recaps the time in which she was kidnapped and tells her perspective of it.

It starts on June 5, 2002 with the kidnapping of 14-year old Elizabeth Smart (Alana Boden) in the middle of the night by a religious fanatic named Brian David Mitchell (Skeet Ulrich). He unknowingly wakes her sister Mary Katherine (Cassidy Nugent). In his hilly encampment, Mitchell and his wife Wanda Ileen Barzee (Deirdre Lovejoy) subjected her to bizarre religious rituals. On the first night, Mitchell forces Elizabeth to change clothes and proceeds to perform a ceremony in which they are “married”; that night, he rapes her. She later realizes that she had previously met Mitchell when he worked for her parents as a handyman.

Mitchell rapes, starves, and drugs Elizabeth while claiming that his followers will kill her family if she doesn't do as he says. Mitchell treats her as his "second wife". In one of these rituals, he strips her naked and forces her to choose her “new name” from the Bible. Elizabeth's narration states that she chose the name Esther.

Elizabeth later drinks alcohol when Mitchell threatens to have her go without food, water, or sleep. While Mitchell forbids Elizabeth from talking about her family, he does allow her to talk about her cousin Olivia. He leaves the encampment to claim Olivia and Elizabeth had prayed that Olivia would be safe. He returns, having been unable to kidnap Olivia, due to a "vision from God."

After being absent for some days, Mitchell returns, and Barzee asks him to take her to the “parties” he goes to. Mitchell brings Barzee and Elizabeth with him to a party, and makes them wear full-length robes so Elizabeth won't be recognized.

Two months after the kidnapping, Mitchell devises a plan to leave Salt Lake City with Elizabeth and Barzee, possibly to Boston or New York City. To research potential places to relocate, Mitchell and Barzee visit the Salt Lake City Public Library with Elizabeth, instructing her not to talk to anyone. There, they are noticed by a library patron because of their unusual dress, each wearing full-length robes with veils concealing most of their faces. A police detective arrives at the library and confronts them. However, Mitchell deters him by claiming that Elizabeth is his daughter and that they are unable to remove their veils or garb for religious reasons. He even prevents Barzee and Elizabeth from speaking, stating that their religion prohibits women from speaking in public.

The three of them relocate to San Diego County, California. During one instance in Lakeside, California when Mitchell is absent, Elizabeth and Barzee are left in their desert camp without water for a week, before a freak rain storm occurs and saves their lives. Afterwards, Mitchell returns, bringing food and stating that he had been arrested for breaking into a church. He decides that they need to relocate again. Elizabeth manages to convince her captors that they should move back to Utah.

Arriving in Sandy, Utah, the three hitch-hike for a while, until Elizabeth angers Mitchell by talking to a stranger. Elizabeth's narration states that this would be the last time that Brian would rape her.

While in a store, Elizabeth notices some missing persons posters on the bulletin board. Mitchell tells her that she is not on the board, and that everyone has forgotten her. The moment they exit the store, however, the police converge on them. As Elizabeth is separated from them, Mitchell claims that he is a traveling minister. After some brief hesitation in front of a police officer who questions her on her identity, Elizabeth finally reveals who she is. As she is taken to the police station, the other police officers arrest Mitchell and Barzee. Later on, Elizabeth is reunited with her father Ed (George Newbern) and her mother Lois (Anne Openshaw).

Later that night, Lois tells Elizabeth that the rest of the family are having a slumber party in their room. Elizabeth declines and states that she will sleep in her room.

In Elizabeth's final narration, she states that she told her story to speak for kidnapping victims, including those who have not been found yet. She concludes by saying, "I am not cracked, I'm not shattered, I am Elizabeth Smart."

A postscript reveals that Brian David Mitchell was sentenced to life in federal prison. Wanda Barzee was sentenced to 15 years in prison. Elizabeth got married, had children, and started the Elizabeth Smart Foundation with her father.

== Cast ==
- Elizabeth Smart as Herself (The Narrator)
  - Alana Boden as Young Elizabeth Smart
- Skeet Ulrich as Brian David Mitchell
- Deirdre Lovejoy as Wanda Ileen Barzee
- George Newbern as Edward Smart Sr., Elizabeth's father
- Anne Openshaw as Lois Smart, Elizabeth's mother
- Connor Patton as Charles Smart, Elizabeth's older brother
- Ethan Farrell as Andrew Smart, Elizabeth's first younger brother
- Cassidy Nugent as Mary Katherine Smart, Elizabeth's younger sister
- Kiefer O'Reilly as Edward Smart Jr., Elizabeth's second younger brother
- London Cardinal as William Smart, Elizabeth's third younger brother
- Sarah Madison Barrow as Olivia

== Filming ==
Smart was heavily involved in the production and filming of the film; she also helped review the script to make sure the story was factual. She described it as being almost dreamlike at times, as some on-site locations were used to provide authenticity. In one case, Smart mentioned a time where she first saw Skeet Ulrich in costume for Mitchell, stating she was a bit taken aback by how much he resembled her abuser.

There was a need to find balance in accurately depicting what happened to her in the film without alienating the audience, as Mitchell raped her daily, and Smart felt a need to tell the story without sugar-coating the kidnapping.

== Reception ==
Variety's Sonya Saraiya called it a startling and bold film, that while similar to the film Room, stands on its own. She added that the film does not diminish Smart's ordeal or add to it with manufactured drama, as Smart's experiences were horrible enough for the viewer.

Others compared the film with the previous adaptation of Smart's story, The Elizabeth Smart Story, with many praising the new film for telling the complete story, and truly portraying what Smart endured. The film is described as feeling like a documentary, with reenactment scenes for the viewers.

It was featured on Rolling Stone's 2017 list of “10 True Crime Shows to Watch this Fall”.
