= Deirdre Lovejoy =

American actress (born 1962)

- Born: June 30, 1962 (age 64); Abilene, Texas, U.S.
- Education: University of Evansville (BFA); New York University (MFA)
- Occupation: Actress
- Years active: 1983–present

Deirdre Lovejoy (born June 30, 1962) is an American actress.

She is best known for her role as Assistant State's Attorney Rhonda Pearlman on HBO’s The Wire. She is also known for her roles as serial killer Heather Taffet (aka "The Gravedigger") on the Fox series Bones and White House Counsel Cynthia Panabaker on NBC's series The Blacklist.

== Early life ==
Lovejoy was born in Abilene, Texas. Her father was in the Air Force, and was stationed at Dyess Air Force Base.

Lovejoy lived in Connecticut, then Pittsburgh, before moving with her mother to Elkhart, Indiana, while Lovejoy was still in the fourth grade. Her mother, Marcia Fulmer, met her second husband in Elkhart and worked as Arts and Entertainment editor at The Elkhart Truth. While in the fifth grade, Lovejoy played her first acting role as one of Big Daddy's grandchildren in an Elkhart Civic Theatre production of Cat on a Hot Tin Roof in which her mother played the part of Mae (dubbed "Sister Woman"). Lovejoy subsequently appeared in several productions at the Elkhart Civic Theatre, often alongside her mother.

In 1980 Lovejoy graduated from Elkhart Memorial High School. In 1984 she graduated from the University of Evansville with a double major in Theater and Communications. She also earned a Master of Fine Arts from the New York University Tisch School of the Arts three years later.

== Career ==
In 1990 Lovejoy appeared in her first television role as Rosemary Kennedy in the ABC mini-series The Kennedys of Massachusetts. Throughout the 1990s and 2000s she appeared on such series as Law & Order, Third Watch, Spin City, NYPD Blue, The West Wing, Cold Case and Law & Order: Special Victims Unit.

From 2002 to 2008 Lovejoy starred as Assistant State's Attorney Rhonda Pearlman on HBO’s The Wire. From 2009 to 2011 she played the recurring role of the serial kidnapper and murderer Heather Taffet (aka "The Gravedigger") on the television series Bones. In 2011 Lovejoy also appeared in the role of the mother of a student in the film Bad Teacher starring Cameron Diaz.

Lovejoy has also guest starred or held recurring roles on such TV series as Lie to Me, Law & Order: Criminal Intent, Criminal Minds, Body of Proof, Girls, Orange Is the New Black, American Gothic, The Blacklist, and Shameless.

Lovejoy has also appeared in several Broadway productions, including Six Degrees of Separation (1990), Getting and Spending (1998), The Gathering (2001) and Nora Ephron’s Lucky Guy starring Tom Hanks (2013).

In 2019, Lovejoy took part in Promethea in Prison, a theatrical project that involved a reading of the ancient Greek play Prometheus Bound. It featured an all-female cast that also included Sonja Sohn, one of Lovejoy's co-stars in The Wire.

Also in 2019, Lovejoy starred in a one-person play she wrote, titled Bird Elephant China. The autobiographical play dealt with a series of unexplained seizures that Lovejoy experienced in 2009. The seizures affected her memory and her ability to walk and talk for almost a year. She also experienced hallucinations during this time. Lovejoy has been seizure free since 2009.

== Filmography ==
=== Films ===
Year	Title	Role	Notes
1996	Rescuing Desire	Bookstore salesgirl	
1998	Number One	Jean	Short film
1998	Sour Grapes	Nurse Wells	
1999	Random Hearts	Officer Isabel	
1999	The Talented Mr. Ripley	Fighting neighbor	
2000	Shaft	Police Officer	Uncredited
2001	My Sister's Wedding	Beverly Modina	
2001	Thirteen Conversations About One Thing	Student teacher	
2006	Step Up	Nora's mom / Katherine Clark	
2009	Gloria & Eric	Gloria	Short film
2009	The Stepfather	Detective Tylar	
2011	Bad Teacher	Sasha's mother	
2013	Killing Vivian	Toaster	Short film
2013	Lionhead	Detective Lundgren	
2014	Thirsty	Doris Townsend	
2016	Billy Lynn's Long Halftime Walk	Denise Lynn	
2017	The Post	Debbie Regan	
2017	Beauty Mark	Pastor Hodges	
2021	Spiked	Chief Collins	
2024	Lilly	Jocelyn Samuels	

=== Television ===
Year	Title	Role	Notes
1990	The Kennedys of Massachusetts	Rosemary Kennedy	3 episodes
1994	Law & Order	Judith Crockit	Episode: "Virtue"
1997	Law & Order	CSU Technician	Episode: "Thrill"
1998	Seinfeld	Customer #3	Episode: "The Dealership"
1999	Trinity	Karen Sealey	Episode: "Breaking In, Breaking Out, Breaking Up, Breaking Down"
1999	Third Watch	Nancy	Episode: "Patterns"
1999–2000	Spin City	Reporter	3 episodes
2000	Perfect Murder, Perfect Town	Detective Linda Arndt	Miniseries
2000–2001	Law & Order: Special Victims Unit	Hernandez	2 episodes
2001	Ed	Ms. Tiana Diamond	Episode: "Closure"
2002	Without a Trace	Mrs. Kathy Peterson	Episode: "In Extremis"
2002	Law & Order: Criminal Intent	Penny Halliwell	Episode: "Malignant"
2002–2008	The Wire	Asst. State's Attorney Rhonda Pearlman	45 episodes
2003	Strong Medicine	Taylor	Episode: "Orders"
2003	Touched by an Angel	Courtney	Episode: "A Time for Every Purpose"
2003	Kingpin	Unknown	Episode: "Black Magic Woman"
2003	The Lyon's Den	Ms. Felicity Easton	Episode: "The Fifth"
2003	Judging Amy	State Attorney	Episode: "The Long Goodbye"
2004	NYPD Blue	Michelle Foster	Episode: "Chatty Chatty Bang Bang"
2004	The West Wing	Lisa Wolfe	2 episodes
2005	Nip/Tuck	Allie Tedesco	Episode: "Hannah Tedesco"
2006	The Closer	Melissa Langner	Episode: "Heroic Measures"
2006	Numb3rs	Daria Samson	Episode: "Waste Not"
2006–2007	Close to Home	Ellen Porter	2 episodes
2007	Cold Case	Regie Kunze	Episode: "Justice"
2008	Under	Detective June-Mary Cavanaugh	Television movie
2008	Shark	Monica Wells	Episode: "One Hit Wonder"
2008	Law & Order: Special Victims Unit	Penelope Fielding	Episode: "Cold"
2008	Eli Stone	A.D.A. Samantha Jarrells	2 episodes
2009	Lie to Me	Holly Sando	Episode: "Unchained"
2009	Saving Grace	Linda Hall	Episode: "What Would You Do?"
2009	Law & Order: Criminal Intent	Agent Carmen Martino	Episode: "Revolution"
2009	The Forgotten	Zoe Jenks	Episode: "Pilot"
2009	Medium	Dr. Betty Messner	2 episodes
2009–2011	Bones	Heather Taffet	3 episodes
2010	Outlaw	Karen Rukheyser	Episode: "In Re: Officer Daniel Hale"
2011	Criminal Minds	Agent Jenny Bates	Episode: "The Thirteenth Step"
2011	Brothers & Sisters	Marissa Crandall	Episode: "Father Unknown"
2011	The Protector	Unknown	Episode: "Affairs"
2012	Body of Proof	Jeannie Morris	2 episodes
2012	Private Practice	Sean Petrucci	Episode: "Apron Strings"
2013	American Horror Story: Asylum	Lana's host	Episode: "Continuum"
2014	Girls	Aunt Margo	Episode: "Flo"
2014	Those Who Kill	Unknown	Episode: "Surrender"
2014	Orange Is the New Black	Chris Maser	2 episodes
2016	American Gothic	Detective Linda Cutter	9 episodes
2016	Shameless	Rita Smith	3 episodes
2016–2023	The Blacklist	Cynthia Panabaker	28 episodes
2017	Elementary	Carrie Traub	Episode: "Be My Guest"
2017	Bull	Rebecca Whelan	Episode: "A Business of Favors"
2017	I Am Elizabeth Smart	Wanda Barzee	Television movie
2018	NCIS: New Orleans	Claire McDermott	Episode: "Mind Games"
2018	The Good Fight	FBI Agent Annabelle	Episode: "Day 492"
2019	Raising Dion	Charlotte Tuck	Recurring role (8 episodes)
2020	Run	Mary Dixie	Episode: "Fuck"
2020	Big Dogs	Ronny Radiant	3 episodes
2020	Manhunt: Deadly Games	Rudolph's attorney	Episode: "Open Season"
2021	Law & Order: Special Victims Unit	Dr. Mackie	Episode: "Post-Graduate Psychopath"
2024	Station 19	Connie	Episode: "Good Grief"
2025	Chicago Med	Angela Tucker	Episode: "Poster Child"
2026	Daredevil: Born Again	Chief Justice	3 episodes
