= London Short Film Festival =

Annual film festival

- Location: London, England
- Founded: 2004; 22 years ago
- Language: English
- Website: www.shortfilms.org.uk

The London Short Film Festival, founded in 2004, is a film festival held annually at various locations in London, in January. The festival celebrates short film production. Each year the festival appoints an international jury who award prizes worth over £20,000.

== History ==
The London Short Film Festival was started in 2002. It is a BAFTA affiliated festival, enabling accepted UK filmmakers to apply for the 2020 BAFTA awards.

In 2020, the festival takes place from 10–19 January.

== Awards Categories ==
Awards categories include:

- Best International Short Film
- Best Documentary Short Film
- Best Animated Short Film
- Random Acts Award
- Best Lo-Budget Short Film

== Rules ==
Submission takes place via FilmFreeway. Submissions are open to short films in every genre, including drama, comedy, horror, science fiction, documentary, experimental, animation, music, and low-budget films.

== See also ==
- BFI London Film Festival
- London Independent Film Festival
- London International Animation Festival
- UK Film Festival
