= Elizabeth Smart =

American activist and kidnap survivor (born 1987)

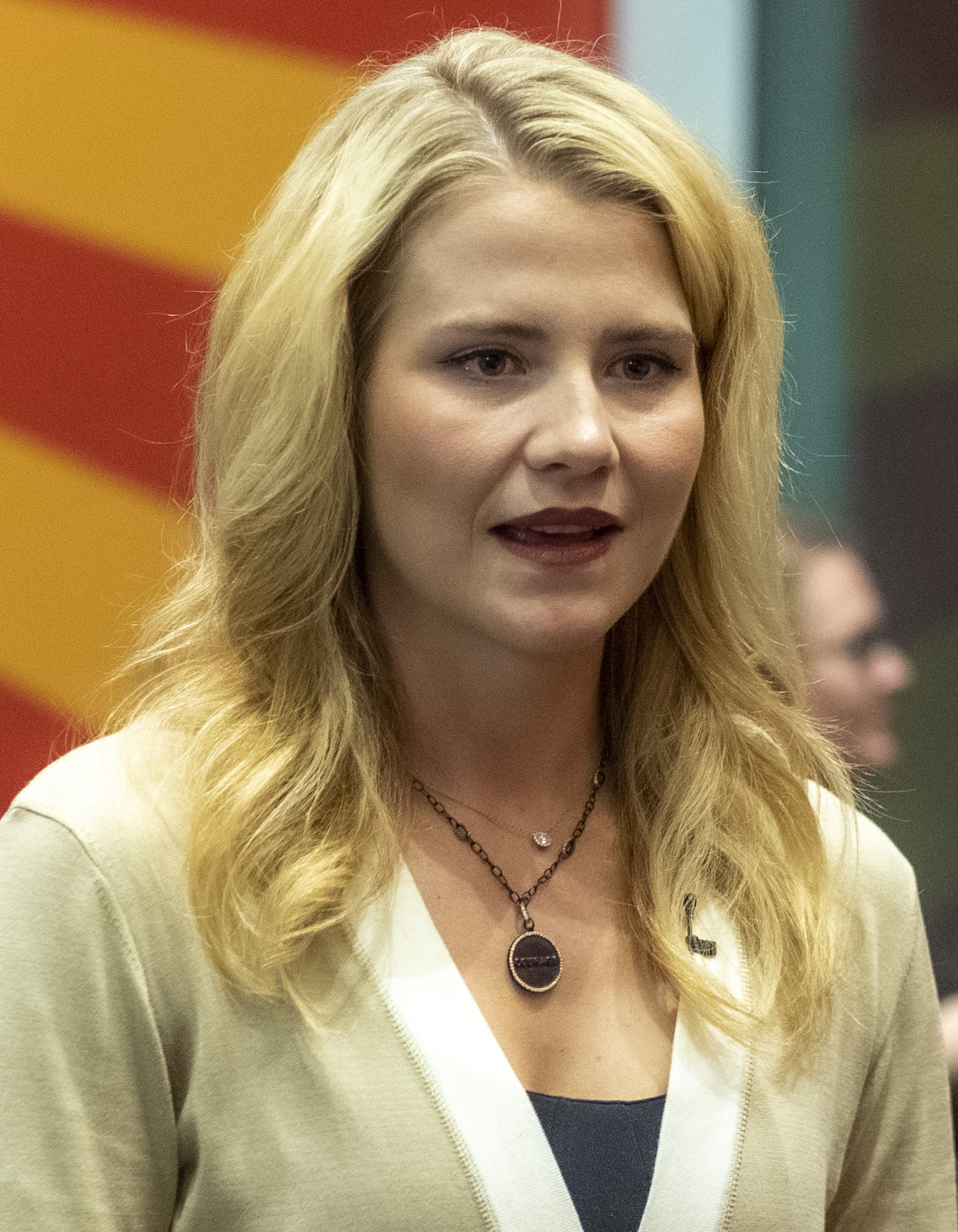
- Smart in 2023
- Born: Elizabeth Ann Smart; November 3, 1987 (age 38); Salt Lake City, Utah, U.S.
- Education: Brigham Young University (BM)
- Occupations: Activist; journalist
- Known for: Abduction survivor
- Spouse: Matthew Gilmour (m. 2012)
- Children: 3
- Website: elizabethsmart.com

Elizabeth Ann Gilmour (née Smart; born November 3, 1987) is an American child safety activist and commentator for ABC News. She was put into the national spotlight in 2002 at age 14 when she was abducted from her home in Salt Lake City by Brian David Mitchell. Mitchell and his wife, Wanda Barzee, held Smart captive for nine months and repeatedly raped and assaulted her until she was rescued by police officers on a street in Sandy, Utah.

Smart has since gone on to work as an activist and advocate for missing persons and sex abuse victims. Her life and abduction have been the subject of numerous non-fiction books and films.

== Early life ==
Elizabeth Ann Smart was born on November 3, 1987, in Salt Lake City, Utah, to Edward and Lois Smart. Her family was part of the Church of Jesus Christ of Latter-day Saints. She is the second-oldest child in her family; she has four brothers and one sister. Smart attended Bryant Middle School and East High School in Salt Lake City. She later enrolled in Brigham Young University, where she studied harp performance.

== Kidnapping ==
On June 5, 2002, 14-year-old Smart was abducted at knifepoint from her bedroom in her family's house in Salt Lake City, Utah. For the next nine months, she was raped daily, tied up, and threatened with death if she attempted to escape. She was rescued by police officers on March 12, 2003, on a public street in Sandy, Utah, 18 miles (29 km) from her home. Two witnesses recognized abductors Brian David Mitchell and Wanda Ileen Barzee from an America's Most Wanted episode.

On November 16, 2009, Barzee pled guilty to assisting in the kidnapping of Elizabeth Smart as part of a plea bargain with prosecutors. On May 19, 2010, federal Judge Dale A. Kimball sentenced Barzee to 15 years in federal prison. As part of a plea deal between the defense and federal prosecutors, he gave Barzee credit for seven years that she had already served. The court found Mitchell competent to stand trial for kidnapping and sexual assault charges. He was found guilty on both counts and sentenced in May 2011 to two life terms in federal prison.

== Activism and media coverage ==
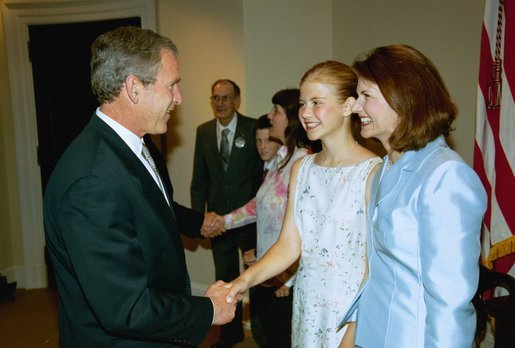
Elizabeth Smart (center) and her mother Lois meet with President George W. Bush in the Roosevelt Room at the signing of the PROTECT Act of 2003

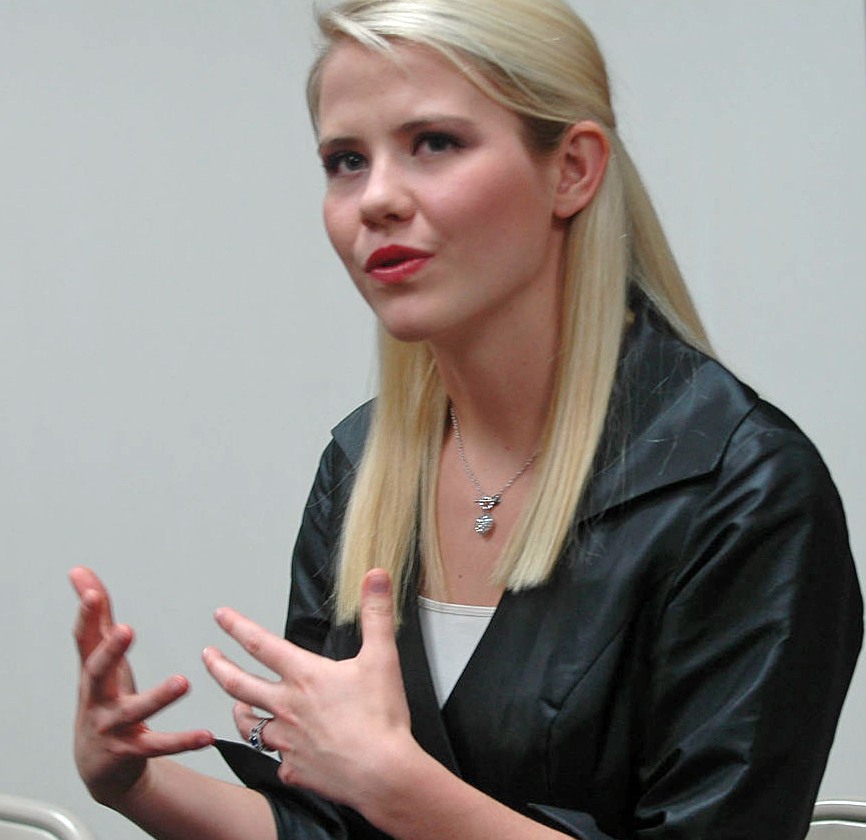
Smart in 2012

Smart's uncle, Tom Smart, and author Lee Benson wrote a book about the search for Smart, In Plain Sight: The Startling Truth Behind the Elizabeth Smart Investigation. Her father wrote another book about Smart's kidnapping, called Bringing Elizabeth Home. A television movie, The Elizabeth Smart Story, was made in 2003, based on the book by Smart's father.

On March 8, 2006, Smart spoke before the United States Congress to support sexual predator legislation and the Amber alert system. On July 26, 2006, she spoke at an event held following the signing of the Adam Walsh Act. Smart was one of five recovered young adults who contributed entries to the 2008 book You're Not Alone, which was published by the U.S. Department of Justice. She appeared at a May 2008 event promoting the book. In 2009, Smart commented on the kidnapping of Jaycee Lee Dugard. She shared that, in her own experience of recovering from trauma, she had found dwelling on the past to be unproductive.

In October 2009, Smart spoke at the 2009 Women's Conference in California (hosted by Maria Shriver) on the topic of overcoming obstacles in life. In 2011, Smart founded the Elizabeth Smart Foundation, which aims to bring hope and end the victimization and exploitation of sexual assault through prevention, recovery, and advocacy. In March 2011, Smart was one of four women awarded the Diane von Furstenberg Award. On July 7, 2011, ABC News announced that she would work as a commentator for them, mainly focusing on missing persons.

In July 2012, Theta Phi Alpha honored Smart with the Siena Medal award. The medal, named after their patroness St. Catherine of Siena, is the highest honor the organization bestows upon a non-member.

On May 1, 2013, in a speech at a human trafficking conference at Johns Hopkins University, Smart discussed the need to emphasize individual self-worth in fighting human trafficking and the importance of dispelling cultural myths surrounding girls' loss of value upon sexual contact. She discussed the unintended psychological harms associated with abstinence-only sexual education programs such as those stressed in her Mormon faith. She said such programs teach that a sexually active girl is akin to a used piece of chewing gum and commented: "I thought, 'Oh, my gosh, I'm that chewed up piece of gum, nobody re-chews a piece of gum, you throw it away.' And that's how easy it is to feel like you no longer have worth”. Smart went on to recommend children be taught about having self-worth, and avoid viewing themselves as victims.

Smart described suicidal thoughts after the first of many rapes by her captor, saying "I felt like I wasn't even human anymore."

In October 2013, My Story, a memoir of Smart's experience co-written with Chris Stewart, was published by St. Martin's Press. The book details both Smart's kidnapping and the formation of the Elizabeth Smart Foundation, which works to promote awareness about abductions. Smart has played the harp on national television in the United States.

In February 2014, Smart testified before the Utah State House of Representatives in favor of HB 286. The bill would create an optional curriculum for use in Utah schools to provide training on child sexual abuse prevention. In early 2015, Faith Counts featured Smart in a video in which she explains how her religion sustained her through her ordeal and helped her heal. As of September 2016, Smart is a correspondent for the true-crime show Crime Watch Daily. Various state politicians have proposed bills that would require all computers to have a pornography filter, branding it the "Elizabeth Smart Law." However, in March 2018, her spokesman denied her relationship to the proposal. Her lawyer sent a cease and desist letter to the politicians in which they were ordered not to use her name.

On June 5, 2017, on the 15th anniversary of her abduction, Lifetime aired the made-for-TV film titled I Am Elizabeth Smart, narrated and produced by Smart, which tells the story of her kidnapping from her perspective. The film starred Alana Boden as Elizabeth Smart, Skeet Ulrich as Brian David Mitchell, Deirdre Lovejoy as Wanda Ileen Barzee, George Newbern as Ed Smart, and Anne Openshaw as Lois Smart. She has subsequently produced other Lifetime features, including Stolen By Their Father (about Lizbeth Meredith's plans to reclaim her daughters after being kept in Greece by Meredith's ex-husband Greg), The Girl Who Escaped: The Kara Robinson Story (which detailed the abduction of Kara Robinson at the hands of Richard Evonitz), Abducted By My Teacher: The Elizabeth Thomas Story (which detailed the kidnapping of Elizabeth Thomas), and The Girl Locked Upstairs: The Tanya Kach Story (which detailed the kidnapping of Tanya Nicole Kach).

In 2018, Smart published Where There's Hope: Healing, Moving Forward, and Never Giving Up with St. Martin's Press.

In 2019, Smart, and numerous other high-profile female kidnapping survivors including Kara Robinson Chamberlain, participated in the Lifetime documentary Smart Justice: The Jayme Closs Case, which touches on the 2018 kidnapping of Wisconsin teenager Jayme Closs, and the murders of her parents. Smart and the other women offer their perspectives on how Jayme can heal and recover.

In 2021, Smart competed on The Masked Dancer as "Moth". She was eliminated during the third episode of the series, placing eighth overall in the competition.

== Personal life ==
On November 11, 2009, Smart began to serve as a missionary for the Church of Jesus Christ of Latter-day Saints in Paris. Smart temporarily returned from her mission in November 2010 to serve as the chief witness in the federal trial of Brian Mitchell. After the trial, she resumed the mission until 2011.

While in Paris, Smart met Scotsman Matthew Gilmour who was also serving an LDS mission. In January 2012 they became engaged after a one-year courtship. They married on February 18, 2012, in a private ceremony in the Laie Hawaii Temple. The couple has three children. As of 2023, the family lives in Utah.

In 2019, Smart's father Ed came out as gay and left the Church of Jesus Christ of Latter-day Saints, leading to the divorce of her parents. Smart stated she was on good terms with her parents and intended to support both through the changes in their lives.

Also in 2019, while traveling home to Utah aboard a Delta Air Lines flight, Smart alleged a male passenger seated next to her groped her inner thigh. She reported the incident and began a self-defense program for women and girls called Smart Defense.

== Bodybuilding ==
In late 2024, Smart began competitive bodybuilding to find a new physical challenge, manage knee pain, and increase her energy levels. Smart stated that the sport provides a sense of personal empowerment. To draw less attention to herself, Smart performed her first three fitness competitions using her married name before sharing her journey in April 2026. She made the announcement following a first-place win in the beginner group and a third-place finish in the 35-and-older group at a Salt Lake City event.

== See also ==
- Alicia Kozakiewicz
