= List of awards and nominations received by Sarah Snook =

Sarah Snook awards and nominations
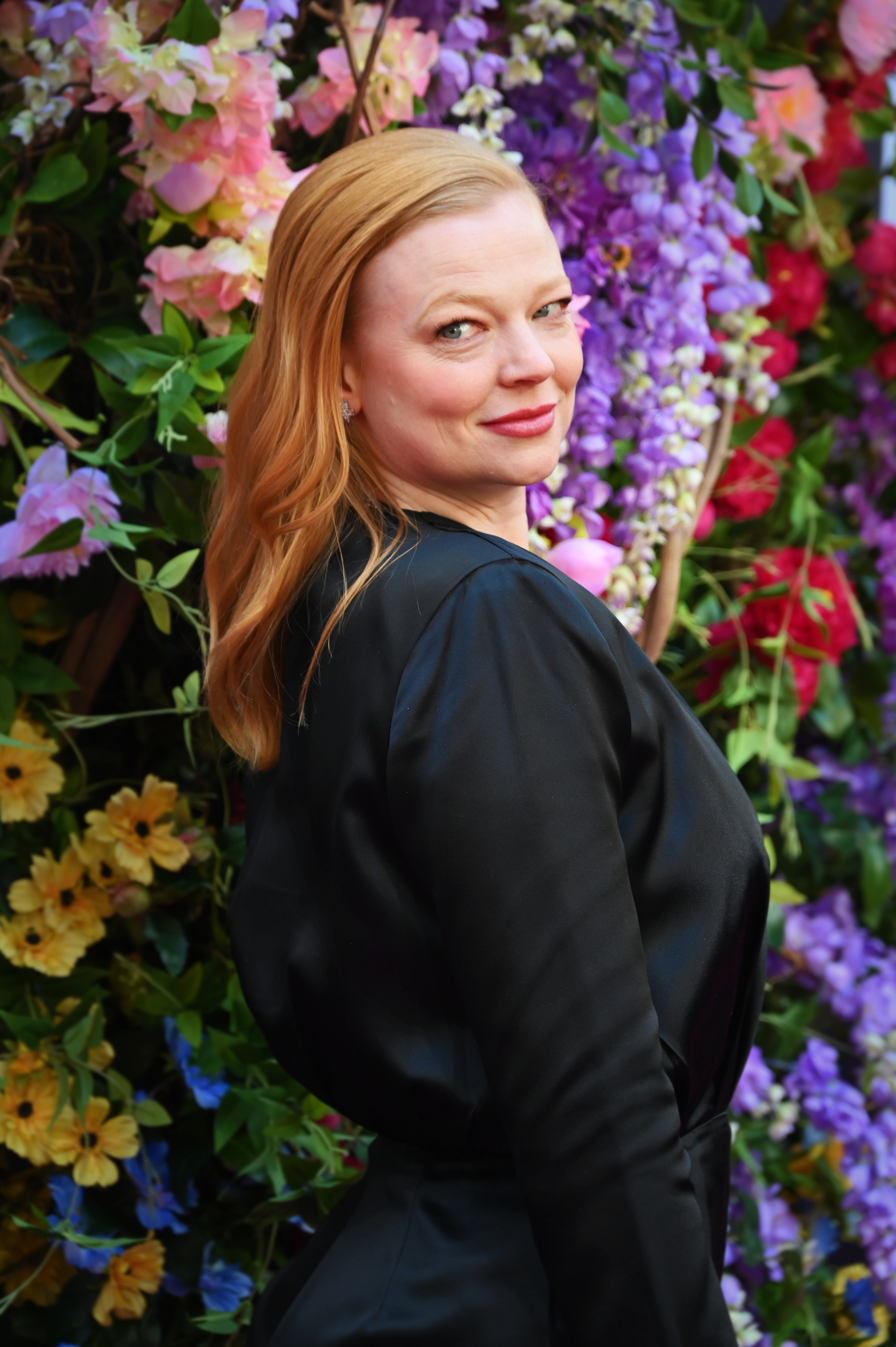
- Snook at the Broadway opening night of The Picture of Dorian Gray (2025)
Awards and nominations
| Award | Wins | Nominations |
| Critics' Choice Awards | 3 | 4 |
| Golden Globe Awards | 2 | 3 |
| Laurence Olivier Awards | 1 | 1 |
| Primetime Emmy Awards | 1 | 5 |
| Screen Actors Guild Awards | 2 | 5 |
| Tony Awards | 1 | 1 |

Totals (Note: Certain award groups do not simply award one winner. They acknowledge several different recipients, have runners-up, and have third place. Since this is a specific recognition and is different from losing an award, runner-up mentions are considered wins in this award tally. For simplification and to avoid errors, each award in this list has been presumed to have had a prior nomination.)
- Wins: 28
- Nominations: 58

Sarah Snook is an Australian actress known for her roles on stage and screen. She has received various accolades including a Primetime Emmy Award, two Golden Globe Awards, two Screen Actors Guild Awards, a Tony Award, and a Laurence Olivier Award.

Snook gained international acclaim and attention for her role as Shiv Roy in the HBO comedy-drama series Succession (2018–2023) for which she won the Primetime Emmy Award for Outstanding Lead Actress in a Drama Series. She also won two Golden Globe Awards for both Best Supporting Actress – Television and Best Actress in a Television Series – Drama, and two Critics' Choice Television Awards for both Best Supporting Actress in a Drama Series and Best Actress in a Drama Series. She was nominated for the Screen Actors Guild Award for Outstanding Actress in a Drama Series and won the Screen Actors Guild Award for Outstanding Ensemble in a Drama Series with the cast.

For her role as a grieving mother looking for her son who disappeared in the Peacock mystery limited series All Her Fault (2025) she received the Critics' Choice Television Award for Best Actress in a Movie/Miniseries as well as nominations for the Primetime Emmy Award for Outstanding Lead Actress in a Limited or Anthology Series or Movie, the Golden Globe Award for Best Actress – Miniseries or Television Film and the Screen Actors Guild Award for Outstanding Actress in a Miniseries or Television Movie.

Also known for her performances in Australian film and television, she has received three AACTA Awards, her first for Best Actress in a Television Drama for her role as an army nurse in Sisters of War (2010), followed by two wins for Best Actress in a Leading Role for playing an unmarried mother in the science fiction thriller Predestination (2014), and the lead role in the stop motion animated film Memoir of a Snail (2024).

On stage, Snook acted in the West End and Broadway productions of The Picture of Dorian Gray (2024–2025), for which she won the Laurence Olivier Award for Best Actress and the Tony Award for Best Actress in a Play respectively.

== Major associations ==
=== Critics' Choice Awards ===
| Year | Category | Nominated work | Result | Ref. |
Critics' Choice Television Awards
| 2020 | Best Actress in a Drama Series | Succession | Nominated | |
| 2022 | Best Supporting Actress in a Drama Series | Succession | Won | |
| 2024 | Best Actress in a Drama Series | Succession | Won | |
| 2026 | Best Actress in a Miniseries or Movie | All Her Fault | Won | |

=== Emmy Awards ===
| Year | Category | Nominated work | Result | Ref. |
Primetime Emmy Awards
| 2020 | Outstanding Supporting Actress in a Drama Series | Succession (episode: "The Summer Palace") | Nominated | |
| 2022 | Outstanding Supporting Actress in a Drama Series | Succession (episode: "Chiantishire") | Nominated | |
| 2023 | Outstanding Lead Actress in a Drama Series | Succession (episode: "Tailgate Party") | Won | |
| 2026 | Outstanding Lead Actress in a Limited Series or Movie | All Her Fault | Nominated | |
| 2026 | Outstanding Limited or Anthology Series | All Her Fault | Nominated | |

=== Golden Globe Awards ===
| Year | Category | Nominated work | Result | Ref. |
|---|---|---|---|---|
| 2022 | Best Supporting Actress – Television | Succession | Won | |
| 2024 | Best Actress in a Television Series – Drama | Succession | Won | |
| 2026 | Best Actress – Miniseries or TV Film | All Her Fault | Nominated | |

=== Laurence Olivier Award ===
| Year | Category | Nominated work | Result | Ref. |
|---|---|---|---|---|
| 2024 | Best Actress | The Picture of Dorian Gray | Won | |

=== Screen Actors Guild Award ===
| Year | Category | Nominated work | Result | Ref. |
|---|---|---|---|---|
| 2022 | Outstanding Actress in a Drama Series | Succession (season three) | Nominated | |
| 2022 | Outstanding Ensemble in a Drama Series | Succession (season three) | Won | |
| 2024 | Outstanding Actress in a Drama Series | Succession (season four) | Nominated | |
| 2024 | Outstanding Ensemble in a Drama Series | Succession (season four) | Won | |
| 2026 | Outstanding Actress in a Miniseries or Television Movie | All Her Fault | Nominated | |

=== Tony Awards ===
| Year | Category | Nominated work | Result | Ref. |
|---|---|---|---|---|
| 2025 | Best Actress in a Play | The Picture of Dorian Gray | Won | |

== Miscellaneous accolades ==
| Award | Year | Category | Nominated work | Result | Ref. |
|---|---|---|---|---|---|
| AACTA Awards | 2012 | Best Actress in a Television Drama | Sisters of War | Won | |
| AACTA Awards | 2013 | Best Actress | Not Suitable for Children | Nominated | |
| AACTA Awards | 2015 | Best Actress | Predestination | Won | |
| AACTA Awards | 2015 | Best Supporting Actress | The Dressmaker | Nominated | |
| AACTA Awards | 2015 | Best Actress in a Television Drama | The Secret River | Nominated | |
| AACTA Awards | 2016 | Best Actress in a Television Drama | The Beautiful Lie | Nominated | |
| AACTA Awards | 2020 | Audience Choice Award for Favourite TV Actor of the Decade | — | Nominated | |
| AACTA Awards | 2024 | Best Actress | Run Rabbit Run | Nominated | |
| AACTA Awards | 2025 | Best Actress | Memoir of a Snail | Won | |
| AACTA Awards | 2026 | AACTA Trailblazer Award | — | Honored | |
| AACTA Awards | 2026 | Audience Choice Award for Favourite Australian Actress | — | Nominated | |
| AACTA International Awards | 2022 | Best Actress in a Series | Succession | Nominated | |
| AACTA International Awards | 2024 | Best Actress in a Series | Succession | Won | |
| AACTA International Awards | 2026 | Best Actress in a Series | All Her Fault | Won | |
| AFCA Awards | 2013 | Best Actress | Not Suitable for Children | Nominated | |
| AFCA Awards | 2015 | Best Actress | Predestination | Nominated | |
| AFCA Awards | 2015 | Best Actress in a Supporting Role | These Final Hours | Won | |
| AFCA Awards | 2016 | Best Actress in a Supporting Role | The Dressmaker | Nominated | |
| AFCA Awards | 2016 | Best Actress in a Supporting Role | Oddball | Nominated | |
| Austin Film Critics Association | 2025 | Best Voice Acting/Animated/Digital Performance | Memoir of a Snail | Nominated | |
| Alliance of Women Film Journalists | 2025 | Best Animated/Voice Performance | Memoir of a Snail | Nominated | |
| Astra TV Awards | 2022 | Best Supporting Actress in a Broadcast Network or Cable Series, Drama | Succession | Nominated | |
| Astra TV Awards | 2023 | Best Actress in a Broadcast Network or Cable Series, Drama | Succession | Won | |
| Broadway.com Audience Choice Awards | 2025 | Favorite Leading Actress in a Play | The Picture of Dorian Gray | Nominated | |
| Broadway.com Audience Choice Awards | 2025 | Favorite Breakthrough Performance (Female) | The Picture of Dorian Gray | Nominated | |
| Broadway.com Audience Choice Awards | 2025 | Performance of the Year (Play) | The Picture of Dorian Gray | Nominated | |
| Dorian Theater Awards | 2025 | Outstanding Lead Performance in a Broadway Play | The Picture of Dorian Gray | Won | |
| Dorian TV Awards | 2023 | Best TV Performance — Drama | Succession | Won | |
| Drama Desk Award | 2025 | Outstanding Lead Performance in a Play | The Picture of Dorian Gray | Won | |
| Drama League Award | 2025 | Distinguished Performance | The Picture of Dorian Gray | Nominated | |
| FCCA Awards | 2013 | Best Actress | Not Suitable for Children | Nominated | |
| FCCA Awards | 2015 | Best Actress | Predestination | Won | |
| FCCA Awards | 2016 | Best Actress in a Supporting Role | The Dressmaker | Nominated | |
| New Renaissance Film Festival | 2017 | Best Actress | The Ravens | Won | |
| Outer Critics Circle Awards | 2025 | Outstanding Solo Performance | The Picture of Dorian Gray | Won | |
| Satellite Awards | 2019 | Best Ensemble – Television | Succession | Won | |
| Satellite Awards | 2022 | Best Ensemble – Television | Succession | Won | |
| Satellite Awards | 2022 | Best Actress in a Drama or Genre Series | Succession | Won | |
| Satellite Awards | 2024 | Best Actress in a Drama or Genre Series | Succession | Nominated | |
| Satellite Awards | 2024 | Best Ensemble – Television | Succession | Won | |
| Satellite Awards | 2026 | Best Actress in a Miniseries, Limited Series, or Motion Picture Made for Television | All Her Fault | Pending | |
| St. Louis Film Critics Association | 2024 | Best Vocal Performance | Memoir of a Snail | Nominated | |
| Television Critics Association Awards | 2023 | Individual Achievement in Drama | Succession | Nominated | |
| Theatre World Award | 2025 | Outstanding Broadway or Off-Broadway Debut Performance | The Picture of Dorian Gray | Honored | |
| TVLine | 2023 | Performer of the Year | Succession | Won | |
| Women Film Critics Circle | 2025 | Best Animated Female | Memoir of a Snail | Won (Note: Tied with Lupita Nyong'o for The Wild Robot.) | |
