= James Smythe (novelist) =

British novelist and screenwriter (born 1980)

James Smythe (born 1980) is a British science fiction novelist and screenwriter, known for The Anomaly Quartet, and the Australia series for young adults. Smythe lives in London and teaches creative writing.

== Career ==
Smythe's novel The Machine was nominated for The Kitschies Red Tentacle Award in 2013, and The Testimony was named Wales Fiction Book of the Year in 2013. The Machine was a finalist for the Arthur C. Clarke Award in 2014, and Way Down Dark was also a finalist for the same award in 2016.

Smythe has also written for the video game Bloodforge, and as a television screenwriter. He has written episodes of the historical drama The Last Kingdom, and crime dramas Vigil and All Her Fault. On 16 April 2026, the BBC announced they would produce Smythe's original science fiction series, Sutherland, starring Gugu Mbatha-Raw. Set in the titular region of Scotland, the six-part series deals with UK space travel in the near future.

== Bibliography ==
- Hereditation (2009)
- The Testimony (2012)
- The Machine (2013)
- No Harm Can Come to a Good Man (2014)
- I Still Dream (2018)
- The Anomaly Quartet
1. The Explorer (2012)
2. The Echo (2014)
3. The Edge (2021)
4. The Ends (2022)
- Australia series [as J. P. Smythe]
1. Way Down Dark (2015)
2. Long Dark Dusk (2016)
3. Dark Made Dawn (2016)

== Filmography ==
Year	Title	Notes	Broadcaster
2022	The Last Kingdom	2 episodes	Netflix
2023	Vigil	1 episode	BBC One
2025	All Her Fault	1 episode	Peacock
TBA	Sutherland	Creator	BBC Scotland
