= List of accolades received by Steve Jobs (film) =

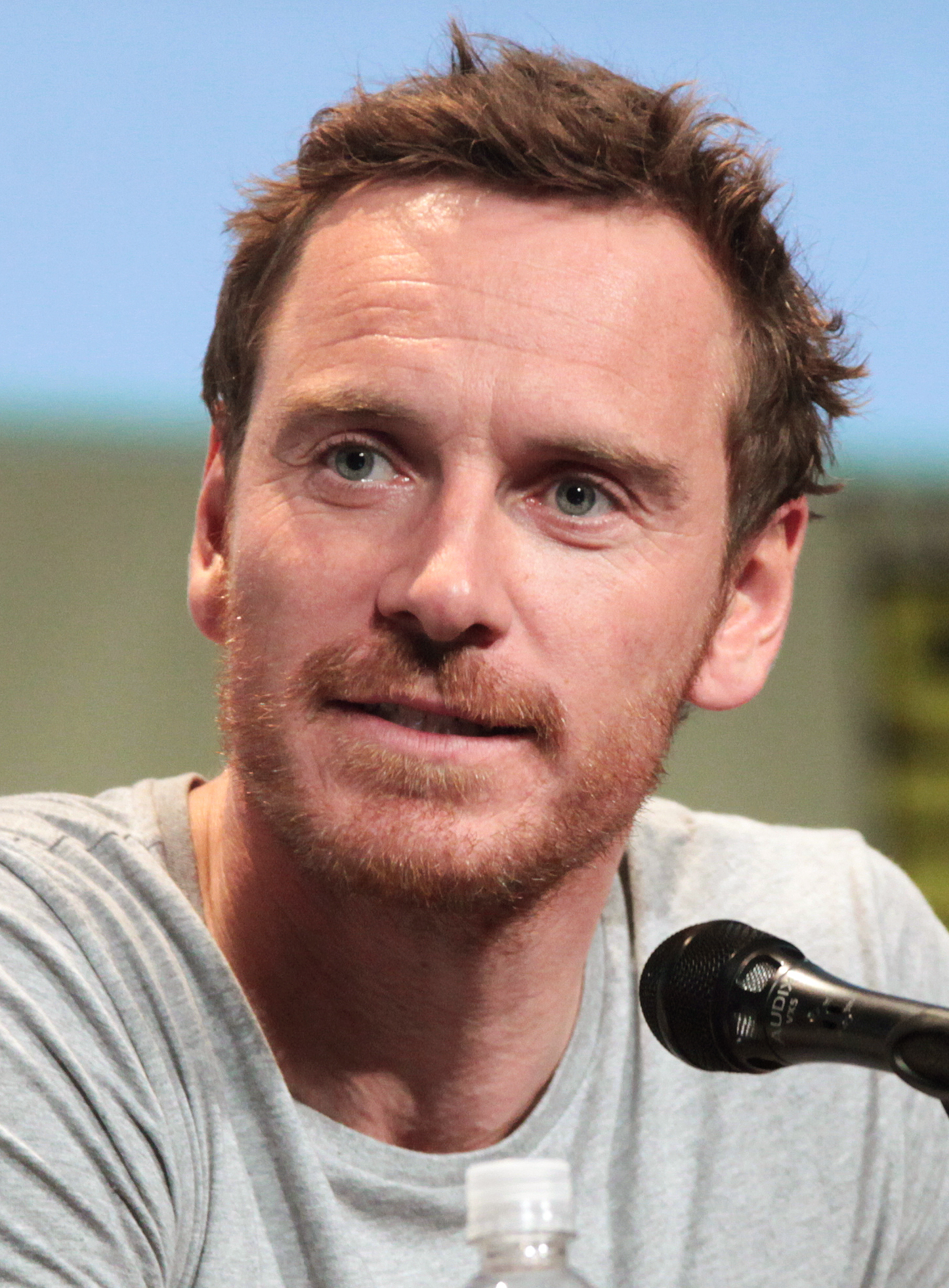
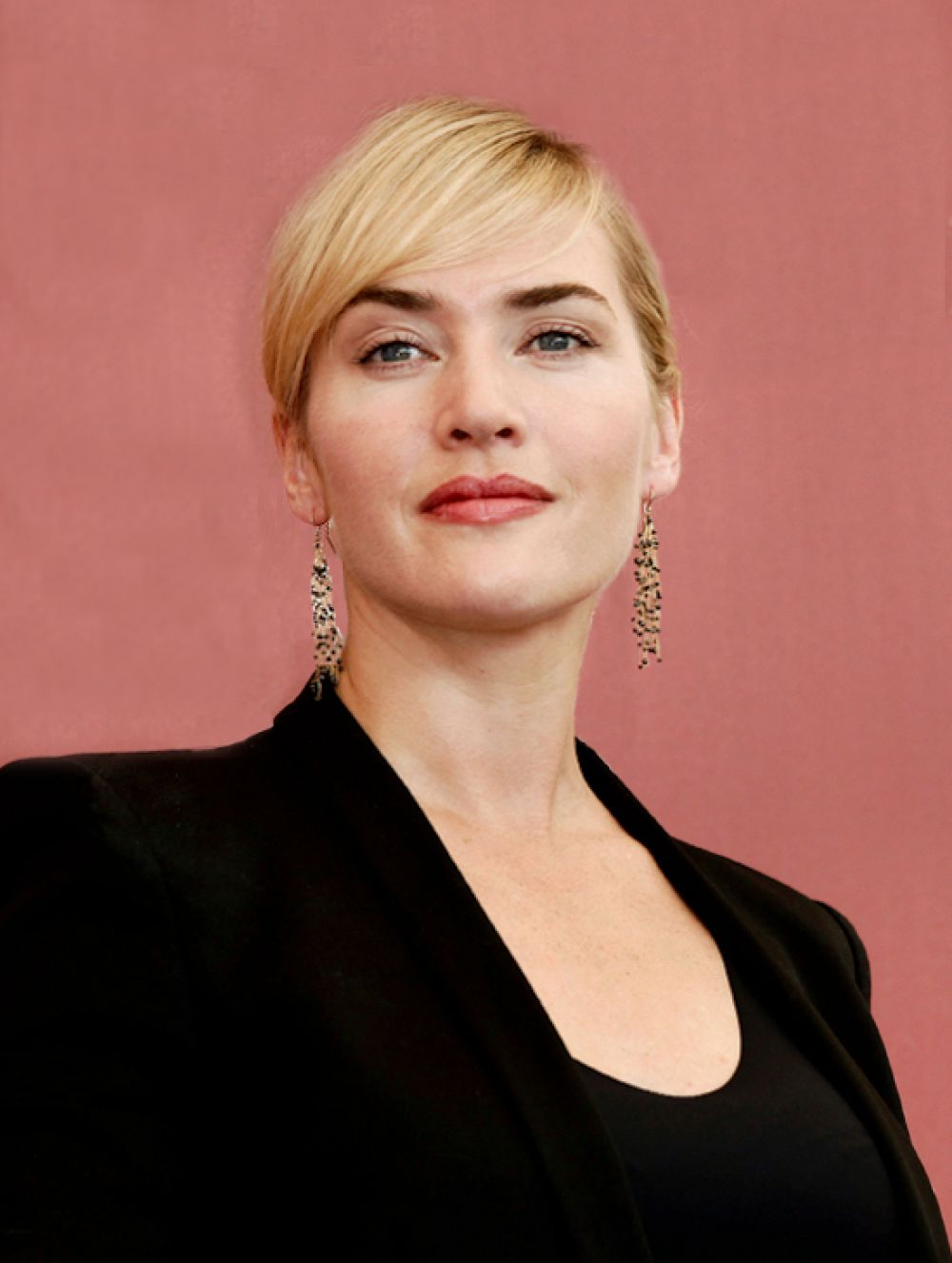
- Michael Fassbender and Kate Winslet received many awards and nominations for their performances in the film.
Accolades
Award	Won	Nominated
AACTA International Awards	0	3
Academy Awards	0	2
Alliance of Women Film Journalists	0	2
Austin Film Critics Association	1	3
British Academy Film Awards	1	3
Broadcast Film Critics Association Awards	0	3
Chicago Film Critics Association	0	2
Dallas–Fort Worth Film Critics Association	0	2
Detroit Film Critics Society	0	1
Dublin Film Critics' Circle	1	1
Empire Awards	0	2
Florida Film Critics Circle	0	2
Golden Globe Awards	2	4
Golden Trailer Awards	0	3
Houston Film Critics Society	0	5
London Film Critics' Circle	1	6
Los Angeles Film Critics Association	1	1
MTV Movie Awards	0	1
National Society of Film Critics	0	1
New York Film Critics Online	1	2
Online Film Critics Society	1	4
Palm Springs International Film Festival	1	1
San Francisco Film Critics Circle	0	1
Satellite Awards	0	4
Screen Actors Guild Awards	0	2
St. Louis Film Critics Association	0	2
Toronto Film Critics Association	0	1
Vancouver Film Critics Circle	1	1
Village Voice Film Poll	0	2
Washington D.C. Area Film Critics Association	0	5
Writers Guild of America Award	0	1
- Total number of awards and nominations (Note: Certain award groups do not simply award one winner; they recognize several recipients, and have runners-up. Since this is a specific recognition, and is different from losing an award, runner-up mentions are considered wins in the awards tally.)
Totals	18	51
- References

Steve Jobs is a 2015 biographical drama film directed by Danny Boyle and starring Michael Fassbender in the title role. Aaron Sorkin adapted the screenplay from the 2011 biography Steve Jobs by Walter Isaacson. The film covers fourteen years (1984–1998) in the life of Apple Inc. co-founder Steve Jobs, specifically ahead of three press conferences he gave during that time. It also stars Kate Winslet, Seth Rogen, and Jeff Daniels.

Initially, it had a limited release in New York City and Los Angeles on October 9, 2015. It opened nationwide in the U.S. on October 23, 2015.

Steve Jobs garnered awards and nominations in various categories with particular recognition for Fassbender and Winslet's performances, and Sorkin's writing. It received nominations from Academy Awards, Golden Globe Awards, BAFTA, Screen Actors Guild Awards, Critic's Choice Awards, Satellite Awards, London Film Critics' Circle, and Online Film Critics Society, among others. Winslet won Golden Globe, BAFTA, and London Film Critics' Circle Award for Best Supporting Actress, while Fassbender went on to win Best Actor prizes from Online Film Critics Society, Los Angeles Film Critics Association, Austin Film Critics Association, and Houston Film Critics Society, and was honoured with International Star Award by Palm Springs International Film Festival.

== Accolades ==
Accolades received by Steve Jobs (film)
Award	Date of ceremony	Category	Recipient(s)	Result	Ref.
AACTA International Awards	January 29, 2016	Best Actor	Michael Fassbender	Nominated	
AACTA International Awards	January 29, 2016	Best Supporting Actress	Kate Winslet	Nominated	
AACTA International Awards	January 29, 2016	Best Adapted Screenplay	Aaron Sorkin	Nominated	
Academy Awards	February 28, 2016	Best Actor	Michael Fassbender	Nominated	
Academy Awards	February 28, 2016	Best Supporting Actress	Kate Winslet	Nominated	
Alliance of Women Film Journalists	January 12, 2016	Best Actor	Michael Fassbender	Nominated	
Alliance of Women Film Journalists	January 12, 2016	Best Supporting Actress	Kate Winslet	Nominated	
Austin Film Critics Association	December 29, 2015	Best Actor	Michael Fassbender	Won	
Austin Film Critics Association	December 29, 2015	Best Supporting Actress	Kate Winslet	Nominated	
Austin Film Critics Association	December 29, 2015	Best Adapted Screenplay	Aaron Sorkin	Nominated	
British Academy Film Awards	February 14, 2016	Best Actor in a Leading Role	Michael Fassbender	Nominated	
British Academy Film Awards	February 14, 2016	Best Actress in a Supporting Role	Kate Winslet	Won	
British Academy Film Awards	February 14, 2016	Best Adapted Screenplay	Aaron Sorkin	Nominated	
Chicago Film Critics Association	December 16, 2015	Best Actor	Michael Fassbender	Nominated	
Chicago Film Critics Association	December 16, 2015	Best Adapted Screenplay	Aaron Sorkin	Nominated	
Critics' Choice Movie Awards	January 17, 2016	Best Actor	Michael Fassbender	Nominated	
Critics' Choice Movie Awards	January 17, 2016	Best Supporting Actress	Kate Winslet	Nominated	
Critics' Choice Movie Awards	January 17, 2016	Best Adapted Screenplay	Aaron Sorkin	Nominated	
Dallas–Fort Worth Film Critics Association	December 14, 2015	Best Actor	Michael Fassbender	2nd Place	
Dallas–Fort Worth Film Critics Association	December 14, 2015	Best Supporting Actress	Kate Winslet	3rd Place	
Detroit Film Critics Society	December 14, 2015	Best Actor	Michael Fassbender	Nominated	
Dublin Film Critics' Circle	December 22, 2015	Best Actor	Michael Fassbender	Won	
Empire Awards	March 20, 2016	Best Actor	Michael Fassbender	Nominated	
Empire Awards	March 20, 2016	Best Screenplay	Aaron Sorkin	Nominated	
Florida Film Critics Circle	December 23, 2015	Best Actor	Michael Fassbender	Nominated	
Florida Film Critics Circle	December 23, 2015	Best Adapted Screenplay	Aaron Sorkin	Nominated	
Golden Globe Awards	January 10, 2016	Best Actor	Michael Fassbender	Nominated	
Golden Globe Awards	January 10, 2016	Best Supporting Actress	Kate Winslet	Won	
Golden Globe Awards	January 10, 2016	Best Screenplay	Aaron Sorkin	Won	
Golden Globe Awards	January 10, 2016	Best Original Score	Daniel Pemberton	Nominated	
Golden Trailer Awards	May 4, 2016	Best Original Score TV Spot	"Only One Cursor" (Motive)	Nominated	
Golden Trailer Awards	May 4, 2016	Best Teaser TV Spot	"Only One Cursor" (Motive)	Nominated	
Golden Trailer Awards	May 4, 2016	Most Original TV Spot	"Only One Cursor" (Motive)	Nominated	
Houston Film Critics Society	January 9, 2016	Best Picture	Steve Jobs	Nominated	
Houston Film Critics Society	January 9, 2016	Best Performance by an Actor in a Leading Role	Michael Fassbender	Won	
Houston Film Critics Society	January 9, 2016	Best Performance by an Actress in a Supporting Role	Kate Winslet	Nominated	
Houston Film Critics Society	January 9, 2016	Best Screenplay	Aaron Sorkin	Nominated	
Houston Film Critics Society	January 9, 2016	Best Score	Daniel Pemberton	Nominated	
London Film Critics' Circle	January 17, 2016	Actor of the Year	Michael Fassbender	Nominated	
London Film Critics' Circle	January 17, 2016	Supporting Actress of the Year	Kate Winslet	Won	
London Film Critics' Circle	January 17, 2016	British Actress of the Year	Kate Winslet (Note: Also for The Dressmaker (2015) and A Little Chaos (2014))	Nominated	
London Film Critics' Circle	January 17, 2016	British Actor of the Year	Michael Fassbender (Note: Also for Macbeth (2015) and Slow West (2015))	Nominated	
London Film Critics' Circle	January 17, 2016	Screenwriter of the Year	Aaron Sorkin	Nominated	
London Film Critics' Circle	January 17, 2016	Technical Achievement	Elliot Graham (editing)	Nominated	
Los Angeles Film Critics Association	December 6, 2015	Best Actor	Michael Fassbender	Won	
MTV Movie Awards	April 10, 2016	True Story	Steve Jobs	Nominated	
National Society of Film Critics	January 4, 2016	Best Supporting Actress	Kate Winslet	3rd Place	
New York Film Critics Online	December 6, 2015	Top 10 Films	Steve Jobs	Won	
New York Film Critics Online	December 6, 2015	Best Supporting Actress	Kate Winslet	Runner-up	
Online Film Critics Society	December 14, 2015	Best Actor	Michael Fassbender	Won	
Online Film Critics Society	December 14, 2015	Best Supporting Actress	Kate Winslet	Nominated	
Online Film Critics Society	December 14, 2015	Best Adapted Screenplay	Aaron Sorkin	Nominated	
Online Film Critics Society	December 14, 2015	Best Editing	Elliot Graham	Nominated	
Palm Springs International Film Festival	January 1–11, 2016	International Star Award	Michael Fassbender	Won	
San Francisco Film Critics Circle	December 13, 2015	Best Actor	Michael Fassbender	Nominated	
Satellite Awards	February 21, 2016	Best Actor – Motion Picture	Michael Fassbender	Nominated	
Satellite Awards	February 21, 2016	Best Supporting Actress – Motion Picture	Kate Winslet	Nominated	
Satellite Awards	February 21, 2016	Best Adapted Screenplay	Aaron Sorkin	Won	
Satellite Awards	February 21, 2016	Best Film Editing	Elliot Graham	Nominated	
Screen Actors Guild Awards	January 30, 2016	Outstanding Performance by a Male Actor in a Leading Role	Michael Fassbender	Nominated	
Screen Actors Guild Awards	January 30, 2016	Outstanding Performance by a Female Actor in a Supporting Role	Kate Winslet	Nominated	
St. Louis Film Critics Association	December 19, 2015	Best Supporting Actress	Kate Winslet	Nominated	
St. Louis Film Critics Association	December 19, 2015	Best Adapted Screenplay	Aaron Sorkin and Walter Isaacson	Nominated	
Toronto Film Critics Association	December 14, 2015	Best Actor	Michael Fassbender	Runner-up	
Vancouver Film Critics Circle	December 21, 2015	Best Actor	Michael Fassbender	Won	
Village Voice Film Poll	December 19, 2015	Best Actor	Michael Fassbender	3rd Place	
Village Voice Film Poll	December 19, 2015	Best Supporting Actress	Kate Winslet	6th Place	
Washington D.C. Area Film Critics Association	December 7, 2015	Best Actor	Michael Fassbender	Nominated	
Washington D.C. Area Film Critics Association	December 7, 2015	Best Supporting Actress	Kate Winslet	Nominated	
Washington D.C. Area Film Critics Association	December 7, 2015	Best Acting Ensemble	Steve Jobs	Nominated	
Washington D.C. Area Film Critics Association	December 7, 2015	Best Adapted Screenplay	Aaron Sorkin	Nominated	
Washington D.C. Area Film Critics Association	December 7, 2015	Best Film Editing	Elliot Graham	Nominated	
Writers Guild of America Award	February 13, 2016	Best Adapted Screenplay	Aaron Sorkin	Nominated	
