= Andrea Mara =

Irish writer

- Born: 1974 (age 51–52)
- Education: University College Dublin

Andrea Mara is an Irish crime novelist. Her bestselling novel, All Her Fault, was turned into a TV drama by Peacock starring Sarah Snook, Dakota Fanning, and Abby Elliott.

== Biography ==
Mara was born in Mallow, County Cork in Ireland but moved around and attended Dominican College Sion Hill in Blackrock, County Dublin before going to college in University College Dublin. Her career was in financial services for 17 years, becoming a fund manager before she began writing a blog when her third child was young. After she was made redundant, Mara got into freelance writing and, from there, segued into novels. Since then, she has published 8 novels, and her next books will be due through Bantam and Transworld.

=== Background ===
Mara lives in Dún Laoghaire, County Dublin, with her husband Damien and their children.

== Published works ==
=== Novels ===
- The Other Side of the Wall (2017)
- One Click (2018)
- The Sleeper Lies (2020)
- All Her Fault (2021)
- Hide and Seek (2022)
- No One Saw a Thing (2023)
- Someone in the Attic (2024)
- It Should Have Been You (2025)
- The Roommate (2026)
- Such a Nice Girl (2026)
