= The Last Minute =

- DVD cover
- Directed by: Stephen Norrington
- Written by: Stephen Norrington
- Produced by: Stephen Norrington; Matthew Justice
- Cinematography: James Welland
- Edited by: Elliot Graham; Stephen Norrington
- Music by: Paul Rabjohns
- Production company: Venom Productions Limited
- Distributed by: Venom Productions Limited; Palm Pictures
- Release date: 2001
- Running time: 104 minutes
- Countries: United States; United Kingdom
- Language: English

The Last Minute is a 2001 British-American urban gothic film, written and directed by Stephen Norrington.

It shows a struggling man hitting bottom and finding light in unexpected places, and trying a huge alternative as the solution to his problems while giving up the life he recently found.

== Production ==
In November 1998, it was reported that Stephen Norrington and producer Matthew Justice's Venom Entertainment had signed a deal with Summit Entertainment and Newmarket Capital Group to produce and distribute The Last Minute, a dark comedy set in the London underworld to be written and directed byNorrington. Following the success of Blade Norrington received a number of studio offers, but Norrington opted to pursue The Last Minute as his next project in order to demonstrate his range as a director. In February 1999, it was reported that Summit and Newmarket had dropped out of the project and instead Chris Blackwell's Palm Pictures would fully finance the film.

== Release ==
The Last Minute was released straight-to-video release in the United States on July 29, 2003.

== Review ==
Billy Byrne (Max Beesley) is obsessed with the ticking clock. He's calculated how many months, weeks and days he has to make his mark on the world (assuming he lives to be 90). Billy is on the verge of becoming the Next Big Thing (although we never actually find out what he does), but gets caught in a downward spiral when his work is poorly received... According to the Internet Movie Database, The Last Minute has only played at film festivals. It's too bad, because the movie is entertaining and could have found an audience had it gotten theatrical release. Hopefully, the new DVD will give it more exposure.

— Movie Habit
