= Elliot Graham =

American film editor and producer (1976–2026)

- Born: June 8, 1976; Claremont, California, U.S.
- Died: September 19, 2026 (aged 50); Los Angeles, California, U.S.
- Education: New York University
- Occupations: Film editor; producer
- Years active: 2001–2023

Elliot C. Graham (June 8, 1976 – September 19, 2026) was an American film editor and producer known for his work on Milk (2008), Steve Jobs (2015), Captain Marvel (2019), and No Time to Die (2021).

Graham was nominated for an Academy Award for Best Film Editing for Milk and won a BAFTA Award for Best Editing for No Time to Die.

== Career ==
In 1999, Graham received a bachelor's degree in History and Film from New York University. His first editing credit was for The Last Minute (2001), an independent film that was written, directed, and edited by Stephen Norrington. Graham was initially hired to assist Norrington with editing, but ultimately shared the editing credit. Graham subsequently worked on two films with director Bryan Singer, X2 (2003) and Superman Returns (2006), both co-edited with John Ottman. Graham also edited the Singer-directed pilot for the television program House (2004).

Graham's editing for Gus Van Sant's 2008 film Milk was nominated for the Academy Award for Best Film Editing and for the American Cinema Editors Eddie Award. Several critics have written about the editing of Milk, which intermixes archival footage from the era of the film with footage of the actors.

The challenge was to incorporate so many archival sequences without weighing the story down -- use too much, and the film could start to feel like a documentary. "The trick with the stock footage was when to use it and how much of it to use," Graham says, pointing to the sequence in which Milk and his colleagues await the results of California's Proposition 6 vote as one that makes inventive use of historical records. Here Graham keeps cutting back and forth between news footage from Election Day, with person-on-the street interviews and poll numbers, to Sean Penn and the other actors sweating it out.

— Winnipeg Free Press

== Death ==
Graham died by suicide in Los Angeles on September 19, 2026, at the age of 50. He died of a self-inflicted gunshot wound.

== Filmography (as editor) ==
The director of each film is indicated in parentheses.

- The Last Minute (Stephen Norrington, 2001; co-editor with Stephen Norrington)
- X2 (Bryan Singer, 2003; co-editor with John Ottman)
- The Greatest Game Ever Played (Bill Paxton, 2005)
- Superman Returns (Bryan Singer, 2006; co-editor with John Ottman)
- 21 (Robert Luketic, 2008)
- Milk (Gus Van Sant, 2008)
- Restless (Gus Van Sant, 2011)
- Trash (Stephen Daldry, 2014)
- Steve Jobs (Danny Boyle, 2015)
- Molly's Game (Aaron Sorkin, 2017)
- Captain Marvel (Anna Boden and Ryan Fleck, 2019; co-editor with Debbie Berman)
- No Time to Die (Cary Joji Fukunaga, 2021; co-editor with Tom Cross)
