= Steve Jobs (film) =

2015 film by Danny Boyle

- Theatrical release poster
- Directed by: Danny Boyle
- Screenplay by: Aaron Sorkin
- Based on: Steve Jobs by Walter Isaacson
- Produced by: Mark Gordon; Guymon Casady; Scott Rudin; Danny Boyle; Christian Colson
- Starring: Michael Fassbender; Kate Winslet; Seth Rogen; Jeff Daniels
- Cinematography: Alwin Küchler
- Edited by: Elliot Graham
- Music by: Daniel Pemberton
- Production companies: Universal Pictures; Legendary Pictures; Scott Rudin Productions; Entertainment 360; The Mark Gordon Company; Decibel Films; Cloud Eight Films
- Distributed by: Universal Pictures
- Release dates: September 5, 2015 (Telluride); October 23, 2015 (United States); November 13, 2015 (United Kingdom)
- Running time: 122 minutes
- Countries: United Kingdom; United States
- Language: English
- Budget: $30 million
- Box office: $35.6 million

Steve Jobs is a 2015 biographical drama film directed by Danny Boyle and written by Aaron Sorkin. A British-American co-production, it was adapted from the 2011 biography by Walter Isaacson and interviews conducted by Sorkin. The film covers fourteen years in the life of Apple Inc. co-founder Steve Jobs, who unveiled the Macintosh 128K in 1984 to the iMac G3 on 1998. Jobs is portrayed by Michael Fassbender, with Kate Winslet as Joanna Hoffman, Seth Rogen as Steve Wozniak, and Jeff Daniels as John Sculley in supporting roles.

Development began in 2011 after the rights to Isaacson's book were acquired. Filming began in January 2015. A variety of actors were considered and cast before Fassbender eventually took the role. Editing was extensive on the project, with editor Elliot Graham starting while the film was still shooting. Daniel Pemberton served as composer, with a focus on dividing the score into three distinguishable sections. The production participated in the San Francisco "Scene in San Francisco Incentive Program" administered by the San Francisco Film Commission.

Steve Jobs premiered at the 2015 Telluride Film Festival on September 5, 2015, and began a limited release in New York City and Los Angeles on October 9, 2015. It opened nationwide in the United States on October 23, 2015, to widespread critical acclaim, with Boyle's direction, visual style, Sorkin's screenplay, musical score, cinematography, editing and the acting of Fassbender, Winslet, Rogen and Daniels garnering unanimous acclaim. However, it was a financial disappointment, grossing only $35.6 million worldwide against a budget of $30 million. People close to Jobs such as Steve Wozniak and John Sculley praised the performances, but the film also received criticism for historical inaccuracy. Steve Jobs was nominated for Best Actor (Fassbender) and Best Supporting Actress (Winslet) at the 88th Academy Awards, and received numerous other accolades.

== Plot ==
In 1984, the Apple Macintosh 128K's voice demo fails less than an hour before its unveiling at Flint Center. Apple co-founder Steve Jobs demands engineer Andy Hertzfeld to fix it, threatening to publicly implicate him in the presentation's credits if he does not. Hertzfeld finally suggests faking the demo by using the prototype Macintosh 512K computer.

Jobs rants to marketing executive Joanna Hoffman about a Time magazine article exposing his paternity dispute with ex-girlfriend Chrisann Brennan as he denies he is the father of Brennan's five-year-old daughter, Lisa. Brennan arrives with Lisa to confront him – she is bitter over his denials and refusal to support her despite his wealth. Jobs bonds with Lisa over her MacPaint art and agrees to provide more money and a house. Apple co-founder Steve Wozniak asks Jobs to acknowledge the Apple II team in his presentation, but Jobs feels that mentioning the computer (which he considers obsolete) is unwise.

By 1988, following the Macintosh's apparent failure, Jobs has founded a new company, NeXT. Before the NeXT Computer launch at the War Memorial Opera House, he spends time with 9-year-old Lisa. However, his relationship with Brennan is still strained. He accuses her of irresponsible behavior and using Lisa to get money from him. Wozniak arrives and predicts the NeXT will be another failure. Jobs confronts him about his public criticism of him, and Wozniak questions Jobs' contributions to computing history. Jobs defends his role as that of a conductor who directs "musicians" like Wozniak.

Apple CEO John Sculley demands to know why the world believes he fired Jobs – Jobs was actually forced out by the Apple board, who were resolute on updating the Apple II following the Macintosh's lackluster sales. Despite Sculley's warnings, Jobs criticized the decision and dared them to cast a final vote on his tenure. After Hoffman and Jobs discuss NeXT's unclear direction, she realizes Jobs designed the computer to entice Apple to buy the company and reinstate him.

By 1998, Apple has fired Sculley, purchased NeXT, and named Jobs CEO, and Jobs is about to unveil the iMac at Davies Symphony Hall. He is delighted by Hoffman's strong commercial forecasts but furious that Lisa has allowed her mother to sell the house Jobs bought for them. Hoffman reminds Jobs that he threatened to withhold Lisa's college tuition, and Hertzfeld admits that he paid Lisa's tuition and suggested she attend therapy. Wozniak again asks Jobs to credit the Apple II team during the presentation, and again, he refuses in an argument.

Sculley arrives in secret, and the two make amends. Jobs and Sculley discuss Jobs' life as an adopted child, and Jobs admits that his need for control stems from his feelings of powerlessness in being given up. At the behest of Hoffman, Jobs apologizes to Lisa for his mistakes and accepts that he is her father, admitting he is "poorly made." He confesses to Lisa that "the Lisa" was named after her. On seeing her Walkman, he also promises Lisa that he will put more music in her pocket. Lisa watches her father take the stage to introduce the first iMac, but only after he hands her the printout of the abstract she made as a kid on the original Macintosh, which he kept with him all those years.

== Cast ==
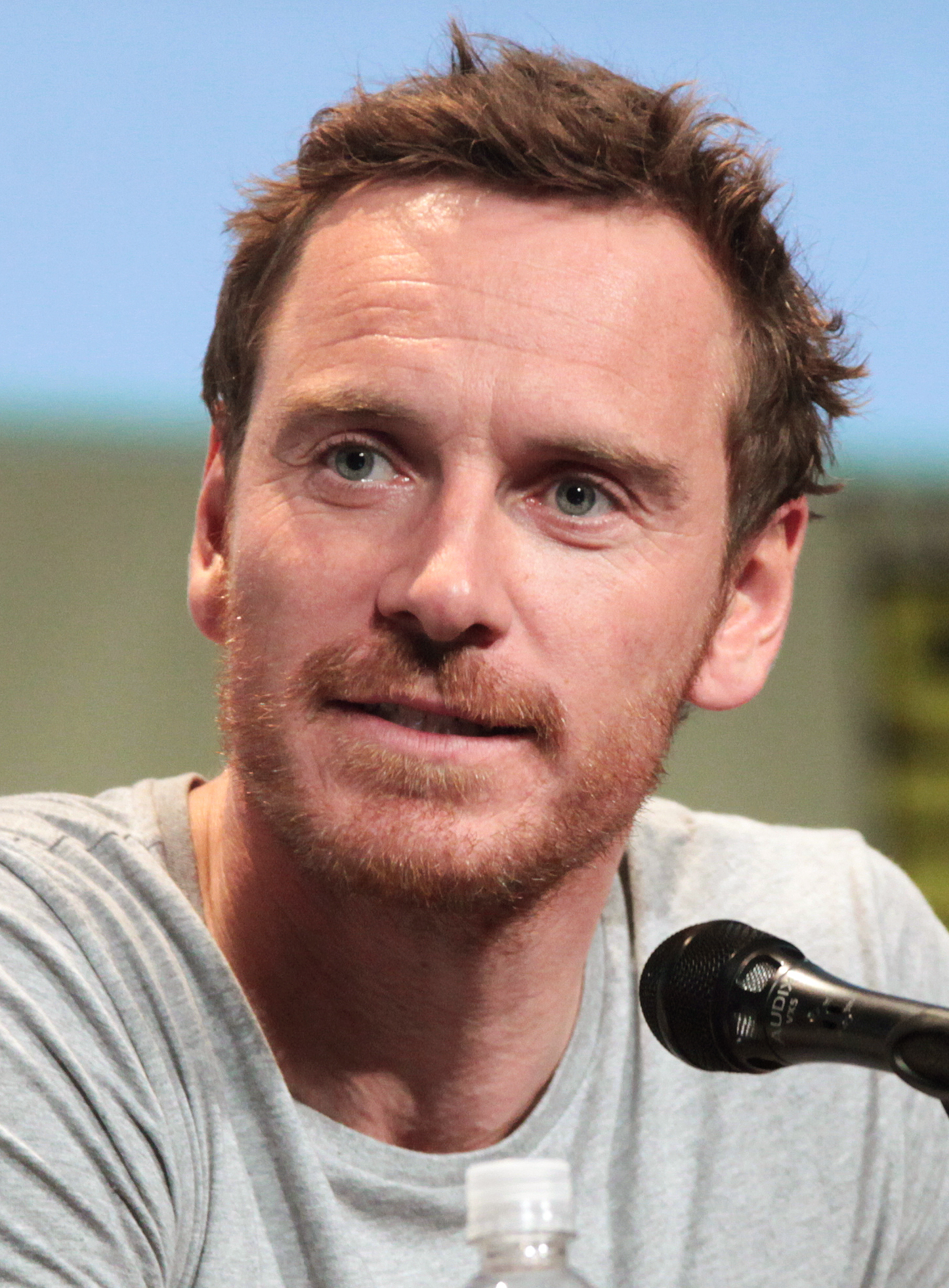
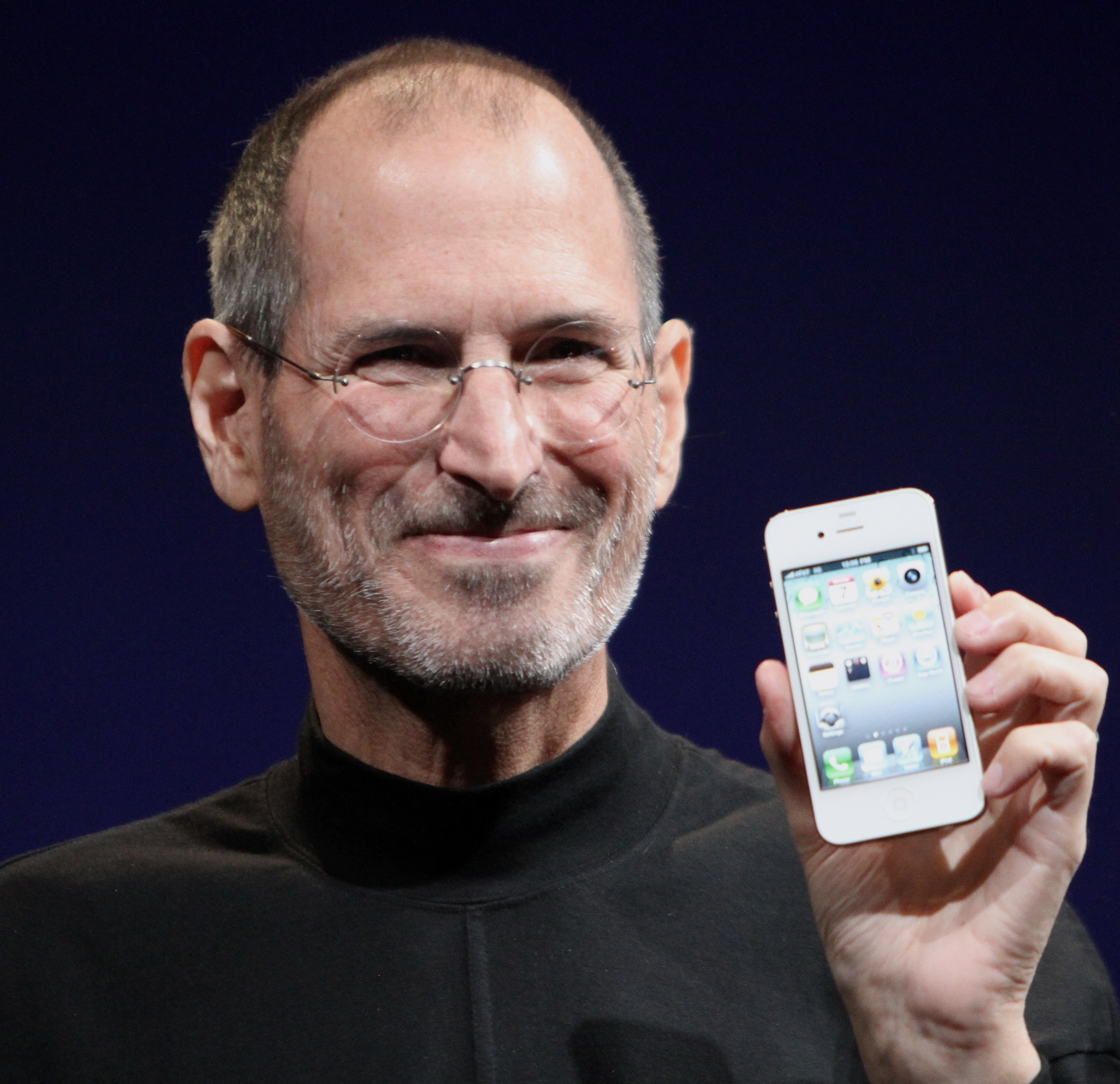
Michael Fassbender (left) plays Steve Jobs.
- Michael Fassbender as Steve Jobs:

Co-founder of Apple Inc. Fassbender acknowledged his lack of physical resemblance to Jobs, but stated that he was more interested in capturing Jobs' essence than his appearance. In regards to how he aimed to depict Jobs, Fassbender stated he aimed to depict Jobs as "somebody who was passionate about his vision" as opposed to a cruel person.

- Kate Winslet as Joanna Hoffman:

Apple and NeXT marketing executive and Jobs' confidant in the film. When discussing her audition for the film, Winslet later commented that she "heard about it through a crew member who I happened to be working with [in Australia on The Dressmaker], I didn't even care what role it was. I just wanted to be in it. Found out the nature of the role. Googled [Hoffman]. Found one picture of her. Got my husband to go to a wig shop. Buy a short-haired dark wig. Stuck it on my head. Sent a photograph of myself to [producer] Scott Rudin. Danny Boyle came to Melbourne and we had a meeting and he gave me the part." Winslet spent considerable time with Joanna Hoffman to prepare for the role before production began. She noted that Hoffman "has a softness to her. She came to America as a young woman and achieved a great deal. One thing that was unique about her as a figure in Steve's life was that she didn't need anything from him. She just needed for him to be the best version of himself. And that's what really set their relationship apart from any relationship with all his other colleagues." Winslet credits Hoffman's difficult childhood in Soviet Armenia with her ability to manage Jobs.
On the nature of the relationship between Hoffman and Jobs, Winslet said that she and Fassbender "were able to develop as literally co-workers. I do believe it was very similar to the relationship that Steve and Joanna had. She was like his work wife. She was head of marketing for the Macintosh, and then she stayed with him for his working life. She was an extraordinary, feisty Eastern European person who was pretty much the only person who could actually knock sense into Steve, and she was also kind of an emotional compass." In developing her sense of the character, Winslet stated that she "just wanted to please [Hoffman] as much as I could. How she sounds, and her accent, is fairly complicated. She grew up largely in Armenia, spent some time in Poland, and has Russians in her family, so she has all three accents, but she's been in America since she was a teenager, so she had American rhythms. You know, she really has this accent that goes way up and down. It's almost impossible to copy because of just how singsongy it becomes. So I had to put it into my own register. But we were all doing accents. I mean, Michael's Irish, and he's playing Steve Jobs, for God's sake." Finally, Winslet notes that Hoffman "did genuinely love [Jobs]. And spending time with her, when I was figuring out how to play this difficult part, she would become very emotional. She misses him terribly."

- Seth Rogen as Steve Wozniak:

Co-founder of Apple and creator of the Apple II. Rogen admitted to not being familiar with Wozniak or his founding work with Apple. He met with Wozniak to prepare for the film, specifically picking up his tendency to move his hands around while speaking. In regard to Wozniak's relationship with Jobs, Rogen stated that "his feelings towards Jobs were very complex and interesting. Part of it was taking it at face value and part was reading between the lines." Wozniak stated that he felt honored to be portrayed by Rogen in the film.

- Jeff Daniels as John Sculley, CEO of Apple from 1983 to 1993
- Katherine Waterston as Chrisann Brennan, Jobs' former girlfriend and Lisa's mother
- Michael Stuhlbarg as Andy Hertzfeld, a member of the original Mac team
- Makenzie Moss, Ripley Sobo, and Perla Haney-Jardine as Lisa Brennan-Jobs, Jobs' daughter (depicted her at different ages throughout the film)
- Sarah Snook as Andrea "Andy" Cunningham, manager of the Macintosh and iMac launches
- Adam Shapiro as Avie Tevanian, software engineer for NeXT and later Apple
- John Ortiz as Joel Pforzheimer, a journalist for GQ who interviews Jobs throughout the film

== Production ==
=== Development ===
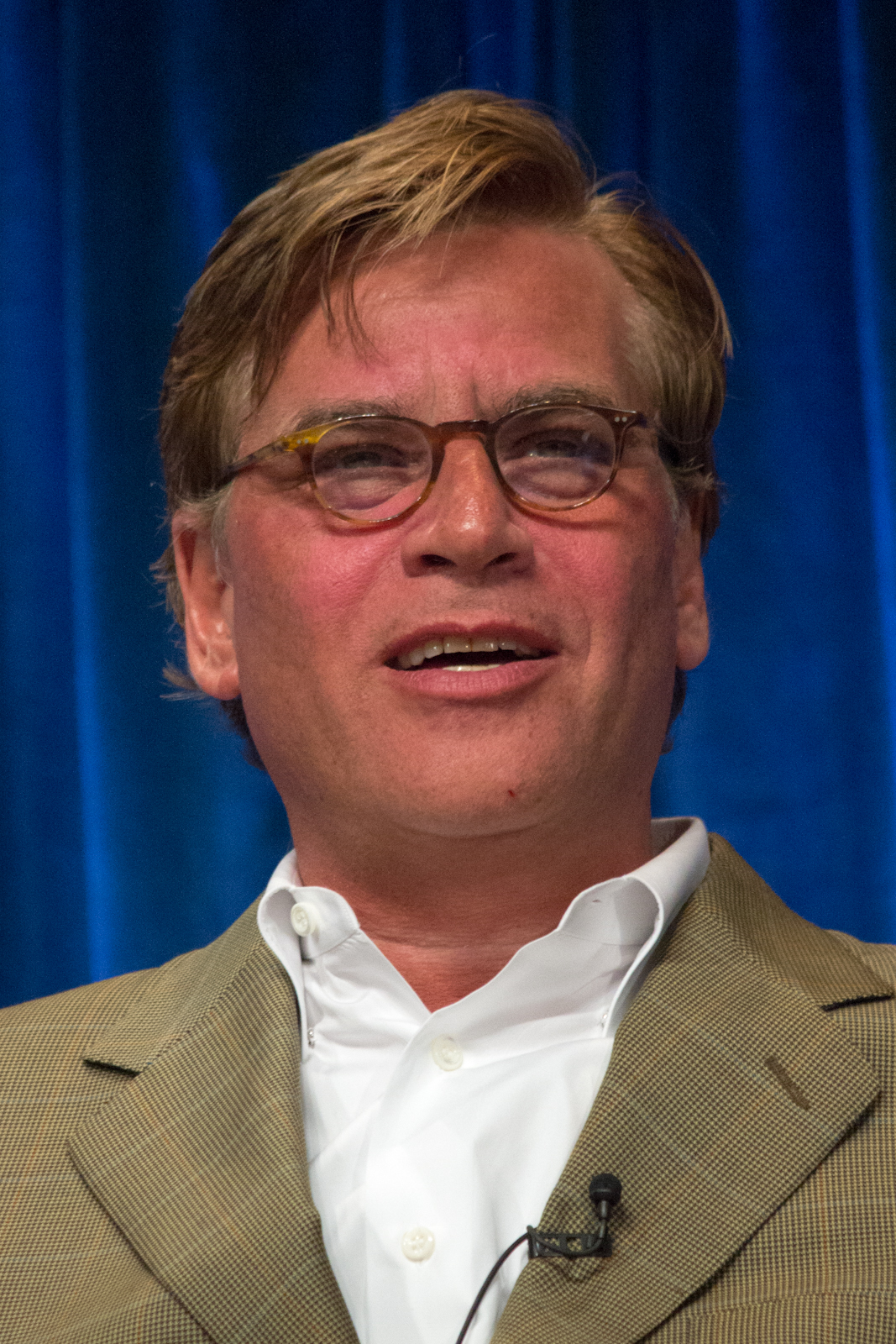
Aaron Sorkin was hired to write the screenplay for the film in October 2011.

Sony Pictures acquired the rights to Isaacson's book in October 2011, hiring Aaron Sorkin to adapt it. In November 2011, George Clooney and Noah Wyle (the latter of whom had previously portrayed Jobs in the 1999 television film Pirates of Silicon Valley) were rumored to be considered for the title role. In May 2012, Sorkin officially confirmed that he was writing the script, and had enlisted the help of Steve Wozniak, co-founder of Apple, for historical accuracy. Sorkin later stated that his screenplay would consist of three 30-minute-long scenes covering 16 years of Jobs' life.

Sorkin developed the screenplay around Jobs' relationship with a few key people: Apple co-founder Steve Wozniak, Jobs' "right-hand-woman" Joanna Hoffman, former Apple CEO John Sculley, original Mac team developer Andy Hertzfeld, and Jobs' first child, Lisa Brennan-Jobs, as well as her mother Chrisann Brennan. Sorkin had a chance to speak with all of them while developing the screenplay, including Lisa (who did not communicate with Isaacson while he was developing his book). However, Sorkin has stated that much of the dialogue is fiction.

After Sorkin's completion of the script in January 2014, development on the project began to heat up when David Fincher entered negotiations to direct the film, with Fincher selecting Christian Bale as his choice for Jobs. However, in April 2014, Fincher exited the project due to contractual disputes. Danny Boyle was then hired to direct, with Leonardo DiCaprio in discussions for the role. In October, DiCaprio exited, with Bale, Matt Damon, Ben Affleck and Bradley Cooper being considered. Sorkin revealed in an interview that month that Bale was once again cast in the role, with Seth Rogen entering negotiations to play Wozniak, and Jessica Chastain being considered for a part. Ike Barinholtz revealed he had auditioned for the role of Wozniak. In November, Bale again left the project, with Michael Fassbender emerging as a frontrunner to replace him, and Scarlett Johansson reportedly being offered a role before Sony put the project in turnaround and Universal Pictures acquired it.

Following the Sony Pictures Entertainment hack in December 2014, Sony emails were leaked which revealed casting demands as cause of delay in the film's production. Also revealed in the emails were the details that Tom Cruise, Matthew McConaughey and Charlize Theron were at one point met with to discuss potential roles in the film.

Natalie Portman entered into negotiations for a role in November 2014, but withdrew from the film in December. Meanwhile, Jeff Daniels began negotiations for a role and Michael Stuhlbarg joined the cast as Andy Hertzfeld. In December, Kate Winslet entered negotiations to star in the film, with Fassbender and Rogen confirmed to star, and Katherine Waterston was cast as Chrisann Brennan. Winslet's participation in the film, playing Joanna Hoffman, was confirmed in January 2015. Daniels was also cast as John Sculley, and Perla Haney-Jardine was cast as Lisa Brennan-Jobs. In February 2015, John Ortiz joined the film to play GQ magazine journalist Joel Pforzheimer.

=== Filming ===
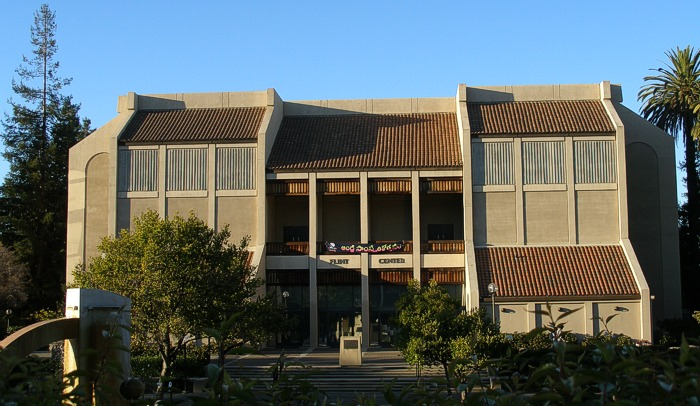
Front entrance of De Anza's Flint Center, seen early in the film during dialogue between the fictionalized Jobs and Wozniak

Principal photography began on January 16, 2015, at Jobs's childhood home in Los Altos, California, with additional scenes shot throughout the San Francisco Bay Area. Production next moved to Berkeley on January 23–24, 2015 (at La Méditerranée, a restaurant on College Avenue in the Elmwood district).

On January 29, 2015, filming continued at Flint Center, De Anza college (the location of the original unveiling of the Macintosh in 1984). In late February, production moved to San Francisco and took place at the Opera House, Louise M. Davies Symphony Hall, and the Civic Center. Filming wrapped on April 10, 2015, after an overnight shoot in the San Francisco Bay Area.

To distinguish each of the three product launches depicted in the movie, Danny Boyle and cinematographer Alwin Küchler implemented three different film formats: 16 mm for 1984, 35 mm for 1988, and digital for 1998. They also wanted each of the film's three time periods to visually reflect Jobs' own development at the time. For instance, Küchler explains that the filming at Flint Center, De Anza college for the first act combined the graininess of 16 mm film and setting to accentuate a provisional, spontaneous look – much in the vein of how Jobs is portrayed at that time. The third act, shot with an Arri Alexa at the Davies Symphony Hall, incorporated an aesthetic and color palette that were intended to be representative of Jobs' own design philosophies of the iMac and subsequent Apple hardware. Küchler describes his experience filming Steve Jobs as "brilliant and challenging at the same time", and that the goal was to "make sure that the visuals kept up with the words", in reference to the production's collaboration between Boyle and Sorkin.

Costume designer Suttirat Anne Larlarb says the real Jobs never wore his trademark turtleneck sweater at any of the launches: "The turtleneck was the off book decision. In those 3 actual launches, in real life, he never wore that. In the 1998 portion of the film, in real life he was wearing a dark greyish/brownish suit. We made it for him as a back up idea in case we needed to adhere to it. As we got closer to the time of filming, I thought we'd set up rules for 1984, we'd set up rules for 1988 – there's so much of the film that's about design and he was about design." Fassbender also remarked that the historically inaccurate black turtleneck for the third act was intentional, believing that wearing the attire "felt like I had arrived at [Steve Jobs'] vision, that the person had arrived." Fassbender later added that he and Danny Boyle decided on this look during filming, and wanted to "give the audience kind of a payoff."

=== Post-production ===
London-based studio Union created the film's visual effects. According to editor Elliot Graham, extensive film editing took place even before principal photography was completed. During the one-week rehearsal that took place in between production for each of the three acts (shot in chronological order), Graham worked on the existing footage and received ongoing feedback from Boyle in the editing room. In an interview with Variety, Graham said a particular challenge for him was balancing the shot frequency and providing enough "visual interventions" to control for Sorkin's dialogue-heavy screenplay. He described approaching each scene as "a series of fight sequences". Michael Fassbender provided multiple versions of his performance as Jobs, which Graham and Boyle then chose from during post-production. Graham also said: "Danny would be involved a lot but also take time away. He would say 'if I'm with you the whole time, we'll always have the same opinions because we're on the exact same journey.'"

=== Music ===
Daniel Pemberton composed the music for the film. Much like the film's visual approach, the score is divided into three distinguishable sections, each corresponding to the intended feel of the act in which the section is heard. "You have the first act which is analog," Pemberton explains, "you have the second act which is orchestral, and you have the third act which is digital." For the first act's composition, Pemberton primarily used analog synthesizers, in particular ones released no later than 1984 – the time the first act takes place – such as the Roland SH-1000 and Yamaha CS-80. The second act's score is more operatic in nature, matching the setting of the San Francisco Opera House. Finally, the third act featured a more introspective score produced entirely digitally to complement its backdrop of the 1998 iMac product launch, and Pemberton correspondingly used his own iMac to compose this section.

The soundtrack also features songs by The Libertines, Bob Dylan and The Maccabees. The Maccabees' "Grew Up At Midnight", the song that played during the film's concluding scene, was reportedly chosen by Danny Boyle himself, who is a fan of the band. Other songs were considered for the final scene, even Pemberton's own score before the song was chosen. The soundtrack was released digitally on October 9, 2015, and in physical format on October 23, 2015.

== Release ==
Steve Jobs premiered at the 2015 Telluride Film Festival on September 5, 2015, and began a limited release in New York City and Los Angeles on October 9, 2015. It opened nationwide in the United States on October 23, 2015. The movie also served as the closing film for the 2015 BFI London Film Festival, approximately one month before its release in the United Kingdom on November 13, 2015.

== Home media ==
Steve Jobs was released digitally on February 2, 2016, and was released on Blu-ray and DVD on February 16, 2016, and includes feature commentary from Boyle, Sorkin, and Elliot Graham. The physical releases contain a 44-minute making-of documentary, Inside Jobs: The Making of Steve Jobs, chronicling the production of the film.

== Reception ==
=== Box office ===
Steve Jobs grossed $17.8 million in the United States and Canada, and $17.8 million in other territories, for a worldwide total of $35.6 million, against a budget of $30 million. The film needed to gross an estimated $120 million in order to break-even.

In its opening weekend in limited release, the film grossed $521,000 from four theaters, for a per theater average of $130,250, beating out Sicario ($67,000) for the best average theater gross of 2015. The film began its wide release on October 23, 2015, alongside The Last Witch Hunter, Paranormal Activity: The Ghost Dimension, Rock the Kasbah, and Jem and the Holograms. Over the weekend, the film was originally projected to gross $11–12 million from 2,491 theaters. However, after grossing just $2.5 million on its first day, it was revised to $7.4 million. It ended up grossing $7.1 million, finishing seventh at the box office.

On November 10, 2015, just over two weeks after its wide release, the film was pulled from 2,072 theaters. Variety said the film suffered from fierce competition at the box office, possible public weariness with Jobs and the low profile of Fassbender in the title role, and that the underperformance at the box office could hurt the film's award chances. After his film was pulled from wide release in the United States, Danny Boyle expressed disappointment at the box office performance of Steve Jobs, while suggesting that Universal expanded the film's release "too wide too soon" and that the studio's move was "arrogant".

=== Critical response ===
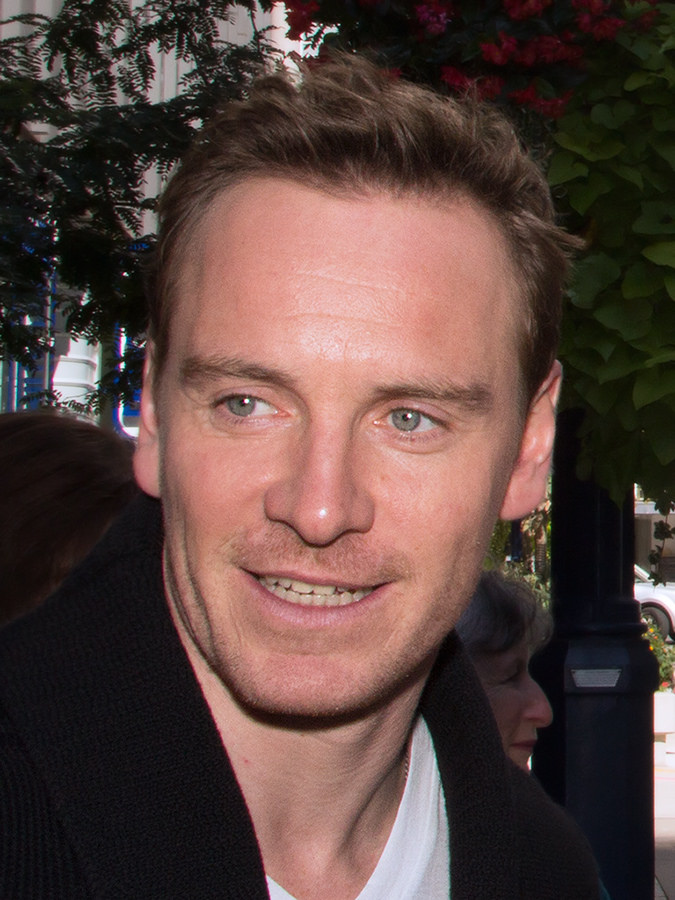
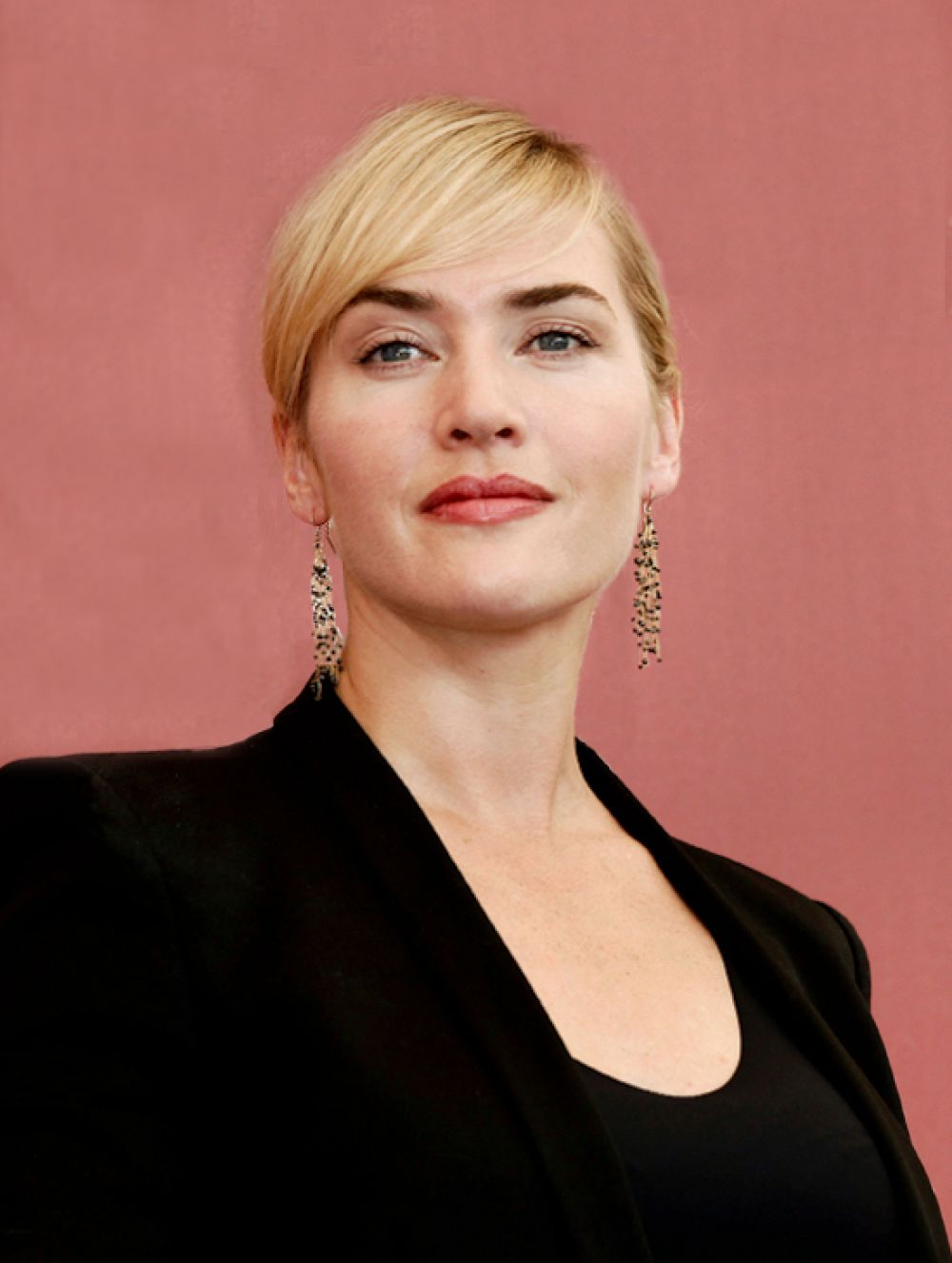
The performances of Michael Fassbender and Kate Winslet garnered widespread critical acclaim, earning them Academy Award nominations for Best Actor and Best Supporting Actress respectively.

On the review aggregator Rotten Tomatoes, the film holds an approval rating of 85% based on 319 reviews with an average rating of 7.70/10. The website's critical consensus reads, "Like the tech giant co-founded by its subject, Steve Jobs gathers brilliant people to deliver a product whose elegance belies the intricate complexities at its core." On Metacritic, the film has a weighted average score of 82 out of 100, based on 45 reviews, indicating "universal acclaim". At CinemaScore, audiences gave the film an average grade of "A−" on an A+ to F scale.

Todd McCarthy of The Hollywood Reporter said Boyle's "electric" direction "temperamentally complements Sorkin's highly theatrical three-act study" and praised Fassbender in the role, who "doesn't closely physically resemble the man, [yet] he fully delivers the essentials of how we have come to perceive the man." Justin Chang of Variety extolled the film as "a wildly creative fantasia...a brilliant, maddening, ingeniously designed and monstrously self-aggrandizing movie." Sasha Stone, writing for TheWrap, stated that Fassbender gives "a stunning knockout" performance as Jobs in a film that is "a kind of talk opera", which to some might seem to be "Sorkin overkill but the same could be said for the best of them: David Mamet, Edward Albee, Paddy Chayefsky and even William Shakespeare. Sorkin is not trying to do anything but write in his own style, thus this film and its exceptional dialogue leaves its mark as profoundly as Jobs himself left his." Eric Kohn of IndieWire gave the film a "B+", stating that "the cast vanishes into their parts...buried under makeup and a distinctive Polish accent, Winslet's chameleonesque transformation is bested only by Fassbender, whose vivid expressions and constant movement turn him into a physical marvel." He also noted that Boyle "drops his usual whirlwind editing style and instead develops an engrossing chamber piece."

Benjamin Lee of The Guardian gave the film three out of five stars, writing that "despite the film constantly informing you of just how incredibly important everything all is, it's disappointingly difficult to truly care about what's taking place." He blames Sorkin's "dominating" script, arguing that "the dialogue stifles" and that "the actors are tasked with trying to wrangle enough breathing space to offer up something of their own." He also feels that while it is "Boyle's best film for years," his direction "plays second fiddle" to a script that verges on a kind of "Apple-sponsored hero iWorship". Joe Nocera of The New York Times, who knew Jobs well, took issue with "how little the film has to do with the flesh and blood Steve Jobs." Characterizing the movie as pure "fiction", he went on to say, "In ways both large and small, Sorkin − as well as Michael Fassbender, the actor who plays Jobs − has failed to capture him in any meaningful sense."

In 2026, writer B.C. Wallin published a book about the film called STEVE JOBS MONOGRAPH, breaking the film down through the critical lenses of eight writers, one perspective at a time.

=== Historical accuracy ===
Danny Boyle, the film's director, speaking on the creative liberties he took with portraying Steve Jobs said, "[it] was what Shakespeare used to do. He would take some of the facts about a man of power and he would guess at a lot of the rest and just gotten away at actually getting at the human in it. And that's what's wonderful about the writing I think, is that it acknowledges the people who disliked Steve Jobs, the people he hurt. But in the end, he brings it back to a very simple father-daughter relationship that he has to admit that he has made some of the most beautiful things in the world."

John Sculley praised Jeff Daniels' portrayal of him, but claims the film misrepresented Apple's success with the Mac, and argues that Jobs was "much nicer" than depicted. Bill Atkinson denounced the film as "not truthful at all. That wasn't his character, and the events didn't happen. You think of Jobs having a reality distortion field. I think of Aaron Sorkin as having ... a history distortion field". Atkinson said that "the only thing he got right in that movie" was the "spot on" depiction of Hoffman, including her accent and how she "tried to rein in Steve from ... making an ass of himself".

Steve Wozniak (who consulted with Sorkin before he had written the screenplay) commented on a trailer released on July 1, 2015, that he does not "talk that way... I would never accuse the graphical interface of being stolen. I never made comments to the effect that I had credit (genius) taken from me... The lines I heard spoken were not things I would say but carried the right message, at least partly... I felt a lot of the real Jobs in the trailer, although a bit exaggerated." Wozniak did not ask to see the final script because he did not "think that would be appropriate... it is the creative work of the producer and writer and actors and director and others." He also noted that the trailer's reference to Jobs' initial rejection of his daughter Lisa evoked an emotional response: "It was hard on me, even being quiet, when Jobs refused to acknowledge his child when the money didn't matter, and I can almost cry remembering it." In September 2015, after seeing a rough cut of the film, Wozniak stated that he felt like he "was actually watching Steve Jobs and the others [....] not actors playing them, I give full credit to Danny Boyle and Aaron Sorkin for getting it so right." In an interview with San Francisco Chronicle on February 10, 2016, Wozniak claimed that the film's scenes between him and Jobs never occurred in reality. Wozniak specifically mentioned that he never requested Jobs to acknowledge the Apple II team onstage, as was shown in the movie. However, he added that Jobs did purportedly show a lack of respect towards the group. When asked about the accuracy of the film's portrayal of Jobs, Wozniak replied: "In real life, to real people, that's the way he could be, very sharp, (although) never quite as much as in the movie."

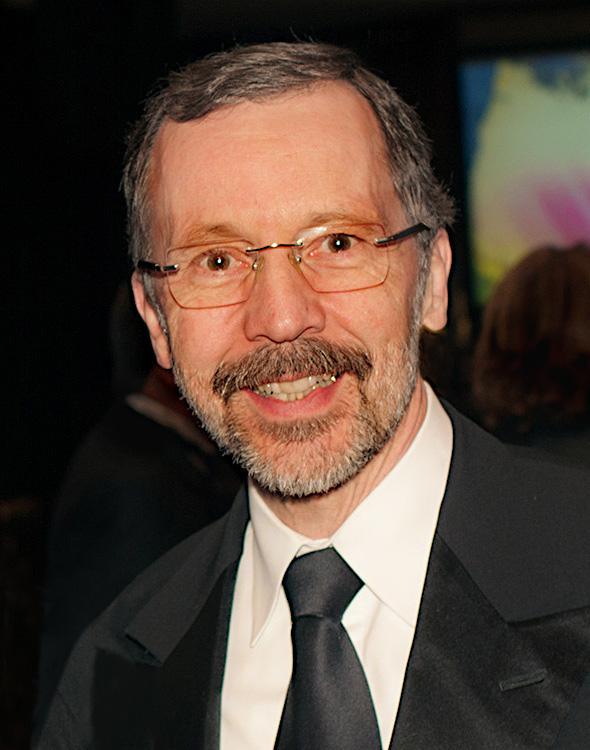
Pixar co-founder Edwin Catmull was critical of the film's portrayal of Jobs, stating that he was kinder than how he was depicted.

Edwin Catmull, president of Pixar Animation Studios and Walt Disney Animation Studios, felt that Jobs would "be appalled" at his depiction in the film, arguing that he was a kinder person later in life than is portrayed in the picture. In an interview with The Hollywood Reporter, Catmull commented, "When [Jobs] left Apple, he then entered into what really is the classic hero's journey: He's wandering in the wilderness, he's working with NeXT, it's not working. He's working with Pixar, we're failing. In that process, Steve learned some major lessons, and he changed. He became an empathetic person, [...] that aspect of the change of Steve was missed."

In a Bloomberg West interview with Emily Chang on August 26, 2015, Andy Cunningham called it "a wonderful film.... It's an incredible character study of a really complex man. Aaron [Sorkin] and Danny Boyle did a fabulous job with it." Her portrayal by Sarah Snook was a "small role but professionally done." The film also portrays Andy as participating in the iMac launch, even though she was not working with Apple at that time. Journalist Walt Mossberg compared Steve Jobs to the Orson Welles film Citizen Kane, which was loosely based on the life of William Randolph Hearst. Mossberg has stated that while both films are aesthetically well-developed, Welles created a fictional set of characters in order to clarify that his film was a work of fiction. In contrast, according to Mossberg (who knew Jobs for 14 years), Sorkin's decision to use real instead of fictional names detracts from the quality of a film which appears to be a biopic and yet is a work of fiction. Mossberg states that "the Steve Jobs portrayed in Sorkin's film isn't the man I knew. Sorkin chose to cherry-pick and exaggerate some of the worst aspects of Jobs' character, and to focus on a period of his career when he was young and immature [...] It would be as if you made a movie called JFK almost entirely focused on Kennedy's womanizing and political rivalries, and said nothing about civil rights and the Cuban Missile Crisis. Sorkin opts to end his story just as Jobs is poised to both reel off an unprecedented string of world-changing products and to mature into a much broader, kinder manager and person."

=== Accolades ===
At the 88th Academy Awards, Steve Jobs received nominations for Best Actor and Best Supporting Actress. The film's other nominations include three British Academy Film Awards (winning one), three Critics' Choice Movie Awards, and four Golden Globe Awards (winning two).

== See also ==
- List of depictions of Steve Jobs
- List of British films of 2015
- List of American films of 2015
