= Bloodforge =

2012 video game

- Developer(s): Climax Studios
- Publisher(s): Microsoft Studios
- Director(s): Roger Carpenter; Glenn Brace; Earnest Yuen
- Producer(s): Murray Andrews; James Sharman; Rhys Cadle
- Designer(s): Craig Ledski Leigh; Alexander Taylor; Károly Kasszián
- Programmer(s): Dave Owens; Gareth Lewis
- Artist(s): Mike Oakley; Nick Hodgson; Joel Mongeon
- Writer(s): James Smythe; Richard Bryant
- Composer(s): Aaron Miller
- Engine: Unreal Engine 3
- Platform(s): Xbox 360
- Release: April 25, 2012
- Genre(s): Action, hack and slash
- Mode(s): Single-player

Bloodforge is a hack and slash action game developed by Climax Studios and published by Microsoft Studios for the Xbox 360 in 2012. The game follows a warrior named Crom, who lusts for revenge against the Celtic gods that betrayed his life of peace, making him slay his own family.

== Gameplay ==
Bloodforge is a hack and slash game in which the player must use various weaponry to attack and defeat the enemy. To aid progress, the player is able to disorient their opponent (indicated by a specific icon appearing over the opponent's head), allowing Crom to perform a gruesome finishing move. Defeating opponents by using a finishing move will award the player more "Blood", which is used as in-game currency. Higher damage causes more Blood to be spilled, rewarding the player with the ability to upgrade their weapons and abilities.

The four main weapons are the sword, war hammer, claws and a crossbow, each one allowing up to three upgrades. A green "Health" bar is displayed on the top left of the screen, above a red "Rage" bar. These bars are refilled by finding and using various Runes, usually found within breakable cairns

== Plot ==
The game follows the story of Crom, a powerful and brutal Celtic warrior who leaves his life of violence behind in order to live in peace with his beautiful wife, Alena.

Crom is at the end of a successful hunting trip. Resting, Crom dreams of a horrific encounter with Arawn, the king of the netherworld realm of Annwn. Crom awakens and rushes home to see his nightmare realised - his village aflame, ravaged by demons. Alena is nowhere to be seen. Crom lashes out at countless demons in search for his wife. He hears her cries and sees she is outside their home, surrounded. She calls out to him in fear as he rushes to her aid.

Alena hurries inside the burning remains of their home. Consumed with fear and blinded by rage, Crom plunges his sword into the heart of yet another demon. Crom turns to face his previous foe in its true form: Alena. Disoriented and stricken with grief, Crom encounters the goddess Morrigan. She leads him to the shrine of his ancestors where he finds a mysterious gauntlet and is told that he must traverse the Bloodforge to gain vengeance.

Crom accepts his fate, releasing his unrelenting fury on all those who oppose him. In order to discover the Bloodforge, Crom must massacre legions of demons, warriors, and monsters, butchering the very gods who betrayed him - including Aerten, the goddess of fate.

== Development ==
Bloodforge was developed by Climax Studios who collaborated with Microsoft to work on the game to only be released on Xbox 360 for the Xbox Live Arcade. After the game was completed, Microsoft decided to publish the game themselves and complete it under Microsoft Studios. Bloodforge was released on April 25, 2012, on XBLA. An update on July 27 improved the camera, re-balanced difficulty and corrected issues with awards and achievements not unlocking.

== Reception ==
Critical reception towards the game was generally unfavourable. Bloodforge received a low rating of only 42/100 at review aggregation website Metacritic.
