= All Her Fault =

2025 American television miniseries

- Promotional poster
- Genre: Mystery thriller
- Created by: Megan Gallagher
- Based on: All Her Fault by Andrea Mara
- Written by: Megan Gallagher; James Smythe; Phoebe Eclair-Powell; Kam Odedra
- Directed by: Minkie Spiro; Kate Dennis
- Starring: Sarah Snook; Jake Lacy; Dakota Fanning; Jay Ellis; Abby Elliott; Michael Peña; Thomas Cocquerel; Daniel Monks
- Music by: Jeff Beal
- Countries of origin: United States; Australia
- Original language: English
- No. of episodes: 8

Production
- Executive producers: Christine Sacani; Nigel Marchant; Gareth Neame; Joanna Strevens; Megan Gallagher; Minkie Spiro; Sarah Snook; Jennifer Gabler Rawlings
- Producer: Terry Gould
- Cinematography: Sergio Delgado; Earle Dresner
- Editors: Sam Williams; Melanie Viner-Cuneo; Dan Roberts; Paul Knight
- Running time: 46–56 minutes
- Production companies: Carnival Films; Universal International Studios

Original release
- Network: Peacock
- Release: November 6, 2025

All Her Fault is a mystery thriller television miniseries for Peacock starring Sarah Snook, Jake Lacy, and Dakota Fanning. It is based on the 2021 novel of the same name by Andrea Mara. The series premiered on November 6, 2025, and received generally positive reviews from critics, with particular praise for Snook and Fanning's performances. It received two nominations at the 83rd Golden Globe Awards: Best Limited Series and Best Actress – Miniseries for Snook.

== Premise ==
When Marissa Irvine (Sarah Snook) goes to pick up her young son Milo (Duke McCloud) from his first playdate with a boy, Jacob (Tayden Jax Ryan), at his new school, the woman, Esther (Linda Cropper) who answers the door has never seen or heard of either Marissa or her son—beginning every parent's worst nightmare. As Marissa and her husband Peter (Jake Lacy) begin a desperate search for their son, their family starts to come apart at the seams. With new friend Jenny Kaminski (Dakota Fanning), the only person that Marissa can count on, the two women form a close and unlikely alliance. Together they hunt for Milo, uncovering deep family secrets that alter the course of both their lives forever. Charged with finding Milo and bringing the kidnappers to justice, Detective Alcaras (Michael Peña) unravels the complex and frightening web of deception and lies that has ensnared both the Irvine and Kaminski families, but his moral code is stretched to breaking point.

== Cast ==
=== Main ===
- Sarah Snook as Marissa Irvine, a self-made wealth manager who panics over the disappearance of her son
- Jake Lacy as Peter Irvine, Marissa's husband, a commodities trader who also supports his sister Lia financially
- Dakota Fanning as Jenny Kaminski, a fellow mom whose son is friends with Milo and the head of marketing at Blackhorn
- Jay Ellis as Colin Dobbs, Marissa's best friend and business partner
- Abby Elliott as Lia Irvine, Peter's sister who is a recovering drug addict
- Michael Peña as Detective Jim Alcaras, a police detective who is investigating Milo's disappearance
- Thomas Cocquerel as Richie Kaminski, Jenny's husband, who is a high school teacher
- Daniel Monks as Brian Irvine, Peter and Lia's younger disabled brother who works as a day trader for Peter

=== Recurring ===
- Sophia Lillis as Josephine "Josie" Murphy / Carrie Finch, Jenny and Richie's nanny who allegedly kidnapped Milo
- Kartiah Vergara as Ana Garcia, Marissa and Peter's nanny
- Johnny Carr as Detective Greco, Detective Alcaras' partner
- Duke McCloud as Milo Irvine, Marissa and Peter's 5-year-old son
- Melanie Vallejo as Sarah Larsen, a parent representative at the school
- Tayden Jax Ryan as Jacob Kaminski, Jenny and Richie's son
- Linda Cropper as Esther Bauer, a retired woman whose address is given to Marissa to pick up Milo
- Dominic Masterson as Kyle Smit, Carrie's high school boyfriend
- Caroline Brazier as Irene Murphy
- Erroll Shand as Rob Murphy
- Laura Brent as Aimee Babich
- Joey Vieira as Victor Beran, a stay-at-home dad
- Orlando Ivanovic as Sam Alcaras, Detective Alcaras' 13-year-old son who has a developmental disability and is nonverbal

== Episodes ==
No.	Title	Directed by	Written by	Original release date	UK release date
1	Episode 1	Minkie Spiro	Megan Gallagher	November 6, 2025	November 7, 2025
In Chicago, Marissa Irvine arrives to pick up her son Milo from a playdate with classmate Jacob Kaminski. Esther, the homeowner, explains that she must have the wrong address; the phone number used to arrange the playdate has been disconnected, and they discover Jacob is with another parent, Sarah Larsen. Marissa finds the real number for Jacob's mother, Jenny, who never arranged the playdate. Rushing home, Marissa and her husband Peter confirm that Milo is missing. Detectives Alcaras and Greco lead the search, as the wealthy Irvines assume Milo was taken for ransom, comforted by Peter's younger siblings Lia and Brian, and Marissa's friend and business partner Colin. Their nanny, Ana Garcia, is cleared of suspicion, while the Kaminskis' missing nanny, Carrie Finch, is discovered to have picked up Milo from school. Having bonded with Marissa as a fellow working mother, Jenny ignores the warnings of Sarah and other parents and arrives to support her friend. Twenty-seven days later, the detectives' investigation now includes murder.
2	Episode 2	Minkie Spiro	Megan Gallagher	November 6, 2025	November 14, 2025
On day 2 of Milo's disappearance, Jenny and her husband Richie learn that "Carrie" faked her identity in order to be hired. Jenny comforts Marissa as the Irvines work to publicize Milo's abduction, but their press conference spirals out of control when reporters accuse the couple of staging the kidnapping. Peter admits he tried to bribe a reporter to kill the story, and Marissa realizes he lied about a work trip, accusing him of an affair with Carrie. He explains that he was exploring an experimental surgery for Brian, who struggles with a painful disability after a childhood accident caused by Lia, who is now a recovering drug addict. Noting that Peter financially supports both his siblings, the detectives deduce that Carrie is not working alone. Ana lies to conceal her friendship with Carrie, but Jenny and Marissa discover concurrent credit card charges at the same malt shop, revealing the nannies spent time together. Carrie is keeping Milo in hiding at a rented lake home, where she disguises herself and waits for her accomplice.
3	Episode 3	Minkie Spiro	James Smythe	November 6, 2025	November 21, 2025
Ana explains to the Irvines and the police that she became friends with Carrie, who took an unusual interest in Milo. At the Chicago Marathon weeks earlier, she and Milo were approached by Carrie, who had a suspicious argument with an unknown man. Jenny, a marketing executive in the publishing industry, succeeds in signing a major client, but remains deeply frustrated by her unsupportive husband. On Day 3, Peter receives a ransom call from an unidentified man, and prepares a bag full of cash, choosing not to tell Marissa or the police. Their family and friends come together to arrange door-to-door canvassing with a crowd of volunteers, including Esther, but to no avail. Unbeknownst to Marissa, Colin, a recovering gambling addict, has been moving their firm's money around, including Lia's accounts. Combing through social media, Alcaras finds a picture of the man from the marathon. In Esther's home, the same man is shown in a framed photo with Esther.
4	Episode 4	Minkie Spiro	Megan Gallagher	November 6, 2025	November 28, 2025
A week earlier, Alcaras is faced with the choice to cover up a rich kid's crime in exchange for getting his developmentally disabled son into an exclusive private school. On Day 4, with the photo of the man from the marathon circulated in the press, Esther comes forward to identify him as Kyle Smit, her former foster son. Kyle was recently released from prison, and his cellmate reveals a visit from Carrie a week before his release. Alcaras and Greco track down Kyle's old workplace, but his former coworker refuses to talk, despite recognizing Carrie from a photo shown by Alcaras. Alcaras informs Marissa of their findings, and after confiding in her about his own fears as a parent, he tampers with evidence to secure his son's enrollment. On Day 5, a gas station clerk recognizes the photo of Kyle, leading the detectives to find Carrie's empty rental house nearby. They discover blood inside, and a body is pulled from the lake.
5	Episode 5	Kate Dennis	Megan Gallagher	November 6, 2025	December 5, 2025
The body is identified as Kyle, shot in the back of the head. Milo's favorite toy, lost during Easter vacation before Carrie was hired by the Kaminskis, is found in the lake house. Colin, Lia, and Brian were the only other people at the Irvines' vacation home, and Marissa realizes they lied about leaving the house that day. Brian admits that he was visiting an assisted living facility, hoping for independence from Peter, while Colin reveals that he and Lia have secretly been dating. With a television interview crew soon to arrive, Brian drunkenly confronts his brother, having discovered Peter lied to keep him from pursuing spinal surgery. As the family turn on each other, Peter is caught in another lie, and confesses that he was responsible for Brian's accident but allowed Lia to take the blame, leading to her addiction fueled by lifelong guilt. Lashing out at Peter with her own resentments, Marissa receives a call that a boy is at the police station.
6	Episode 6	Kate Dennis	Phoebe Eclair-Powell	November 6, 2025	December 12, 2025
Left unharmed in a motel parking lot, Milo is reunited with his parents. Alcaras and Greco determine that he was briefly kept at the motel, where they discover the body of Rob Murphy, Colin's bookie. After the detectives suggest Milo was likely released because a ransom was paid, Marissa discovers Peter's bag of cash, and he admits to receiving the ransom call but no arrangements were made. Standing up to the manipulative Sarah, Jenny discovers Richie has been lying to avoid his parental duties; she confronts him, and asks for a divorce. The detectives interview Rob's ex-wife Irene, Kyle's former coworker, learning that Rob and Irene are the parents of Carrie, whose real name is Josie. With Colin, Lia, and Brian at the Irvines' home, Marissa confronts Colin for his financial malfeasance, and he admits that he relapsed and lost the money gambling. As she accuses him of being involved with the kidnapping, Josie enters the house with a gun.
7	Episode 7	Kate Dennis	Kam Odedra	November 6, 2025	December 19, 2025
Six years earlier, Josie and Kyle are happily in love but struggling financially, expecting their first child. After Kyle is sent to prison for drug dealing and their infant son is killed in a car accident, Josie falls into a downward spiral, forced to live with the abusive Irene. In the years following, Josie reconnects with Rob, accompanying him as he collects money from delinquent clients. While her father confronts Colin at the Irvines' Easter vacation, Josie meets Milo and discovers they both experience synesthesia, taking his forgotten toy. Obsessed with Milo, Josie is kicked out by Irene and adopts the identity of Carrie Finch to be hired by Jenny, befriending Ana to get close to Milo. After Kyle's release, Josie convinces him to start a new life together with the kidnapped Milo. They enlist Rob's help, but he secretly makes the ransom call to Peter instead; unbeknownst to Josie, he kills Kyle at the lake house. Bringing Milo to Rob's motel, Josie later returns to find him gone and her father dead, with a recording of his murder captured on his phone. Taking her father's gun, Josie arrives at the Irvines' home.
8	Episode 8	Kate Dennis	Megan Gallagher	November 6, 2025	December 26, 2025
Colin grabs the gun and is fatally shot, and Josie allows Lia to call an ambulance as Marissa sends Brian to comfort Milo. Warning Marissa to protect Milo from Peter, Josie is overpowered and shot dead by Peter, who is forced to reveal the full truth. Six years prior, while driving with her infant son, Josie was in a head-on collision with Peter, Marissa, and their own newborn son, who was killed. Peter switched the two babies, raising Josie's son as Milo, but Josie realized the truth and devised her plan to take him back. Marissa listens to Rob's recording, which reveals that Peter killed him and left a blindfolded Milo to be discovered by the police. Peter convinces her to give him the phone for Milo's sake, and she confides in Jenny, trapped between losing Milo by telling the truth, and the danger Peter poses to them both. At Colin's funeral, Marissa orchestrates Peter's death by allergic reaction, and Lia lies to protect her. Deducing the truth about Milo, Alcaras assures Marissa that the case is closed, with no moral qualms about the outcome. Both free of their husbands, Marissa and Jenny watch their sons play together.

== Production ==
=== Development ===
Megan Gallagher is writer, creator, and executive producer on the series, which is an adaptation of the best-selling novel of the same name by Andrea Mara who is associate producer. Sarah Snook stars and is also an executive producer. Universal International Studios is producing the series. Minkie Spiro is set to direct several episodes and executive produce. Other executive producers are Nigel Marchant, Gareth Neame and Joanna Strevens for Carnival Films, Jennifer Gabler Rawlings and Christine A. Sacani. The series producer is Terry Gould. Kate Dennis has directed multiple episodes as well.

=== Casting ===
On July 24, 2024, Jake Lacy and Dakota Fanning joined Sarah Snook as the main cast. In August 2024, Jay Ellis, Abby Elliott, Michael Peña, Thomas Cocquerel, and Daniel Monks were cast as series regulars.

=== Filming ===
Principal photography took place in Melbourne in August 2024.

== Release ==
The series premiered on November 6, 2025. The show's success led the creator to sign a deal with Universal Global Television.

== Reception ==
=== Critical response ===
The review aggregator website Rotten Tomatoes reported an 80% approval rating based on 38 critic reviews. The website's critics consensus reads, "A twisty thriller that underscores the societal pressures placed on working mothers, All Her Fault is an addicting watch thanks largely to Sarah Snook and Dakota Fanning's emotionally grounded performances." Metacritic assigned a score of 63 out of 100 based on 18 critics, indicating "generally favorable" reviews.

=== Viewership ===
All Her Fault debuted on the Nielsen charts during its premiere week with 452 million viewing minutes in its first four days, placing seventh among original series. According to ranking data from Showlabs, All Her Fault ranked No. 1 on Peacock in the United States during the week of 10–17 November 2025. On December 10, 2025, it was announced that All Her Fault had become the most-watched original series launch in Peacock's history. In its first three weeks of availability, the series hit 46 million hours watched.

=== Accolades ===
Award	Date of ceremony	Category	Nominee(s)	Result	Ref.
Critics' Choice Television Awards	January 4, 2026	Best Limited Series	All Her Fault	Nominated	
Critics' Choice Television Awards	January 4, 2026	Best Actress in a Limited Series or Movie Made for Television	Sarah Snook	Won	
Critics' Choice Television Awards	January 4, 2026	Best Supporting Actor in a Limited Series or Movie Made for Television	Michael Peña	Nominated	
Critics' Choice Television Awards	January 4, 2026	Best Supporting Actress in a Limited Series or Movie Made for Television	Sophia Lillis	Nominated	
Golden Globe Awards	January 11, 2026	Best Limited Series, Anthology Series, or Motion Picture Made for Television	All Her Fault	Nominated	
Golden Globe Awards	January 11, 2026	Best Female Actor in a Limited Series, Anthology Series, or Motion Picture Made for Television	Sarah Snook	Nominated	
The Actor Awards	March 1, 2026	Outstanding Performance by a Female Actor in a Television Movie or Limited Series	Sarah Snook	Nominated	
Astra TV Awards	August 15, 2026	Best Limited Series	All Her Fault	Nominated	
Astra TV Awards	August 15, 2026	Best Actress in a Limited Series or TV Movie	Sarah Snook	Nominated	
Astra TV Awards	August 15, 2026	Best Supporting Actor in a Limited Series or TV Movie	Jake Lacy	Nominated	
Astra TV Awards	August 15, 2026	Best Supporting Actress in a Limited Series or TV Movie	Dakota Fanning	Nominated	
Astra TV Awards	August 15, 2026	Best Limited Series or TV Movie Cast Ensemble	All Her Fault	Nominated	
Astra TV Awards	August 15, 2026	Best Directing in a Limited Series or TV Movie	All Her Fault	Nominated	
Astra TV Awards	August 15, 2026	Best Writing in a Limited Series or TV Movie	All Her Fault	Nominated	
Television Critics Association Awards	August 20, 2026	Outstanding Achievement in Movies, Miniseries and Specials	All Her Fault	Nominated	
Primetime Emmy Awards	September 14, 2026	Outstanding Limited or Anthology Series	Christine Sacani, Nigel Marchant, Gareth Neame, Joanna Strevens, Megan Gallagher, Minkie Spiro, Sarah Snook, Jennifer Gabler Rawlings, and Terry Gould	Nominated	
Primetime Emmy Awards	September 14, 2026	Outstanding Lead Actress in a Limited or Anthology Series or Movie	Sarah Snook	Nominated	
Primetime Creative Arts Emmy Awards	September 6, 2026				
Primetime Creative Arts Emmy Awards	September 6, 2026	Outstanding Supporting Actress in a Limited or Anthology Series or Movie	Dakota Fanning	Nominated	
Primetime Creative Arts Emmy Awards	September 6, 2026	Outstanding Writing for a Limited or Anthology Series or Movie	Megan Gallagher (for "Episode 8")	Nominated	
Primetime Creative Arts Emmy Awards	September 6, 2026	Outstanding Casting for a Limited or Anthology Series or Movie	David Rubin, Djinous Rowling, Matt Lander, and Jane Norris	Nominated	
Primetime Creative Arts Emmy Awards	September 6, 2026	Outstanding Music Composition for a Limited or Anthology Series, Movie, or Special (Original Dramatic Score)	Jeff Beal (for "Episode 7")	Nominated	
Primetime Creative Arts Emmy Awards	September 6, 2026	Outstanding Original Main Title Theme Music	Jeff Beal	Nominated	
