= Stephen Norrington =

British film director

- Born: Stephen Norrington; 1964 (age 61–62); London, England, UK
- Occupations: Film director, special effects artist, makeup artist, sculptor, illustrator, storyboard artist
- Years active: 1984–present; 1994–2003 (film directing)

Stephen Norrington (born 1964) is an English special effects artist and retired film director known for his work in the horror and action genres. Beginning his career as a sculptor and makeup artist, he worked under Dick Smith, Rick Baker, and Stan Winston on a number of well-known, effects-driven films of the 1980s and 90s. His directorial credits include the cult sci-fi horror film Death Machine and the comic book adaptations Blade and The League of Extraordinary Gentlemen. He portrayed Michael Morbius in the alternative ending to Blade.

== Career ==
Norrington first worked in film as a special effects artist, doing so for several years, which included work on the films Aliens and Split Second. In 1999, Norrington was offered to direct Blade II, the sequel to his 1998 film. He turned it down, having deliberately negotiated a one-picture deal for the first film. "I told my agent that I'd only do a 1-picture deal for Blade," Norrington explained. "The studio was simultaneously offended and nonplussed—I think they figured I was mentally ill." The studio hired Guillermo del Toro instead. He directed League of Extraordinary Gentlemen (2003) during which he experienced significant creative conflicts with the film's star Sean Connery. Following the production, Norrington left mainstream studio filmmaking and has since focused on independent projects, including The Migrant, a micro-budget sci-fi film he's producing single-handedly from his home studio.

Norrington was originally attached to Dimension Films's Ghost Rider before it was acquired by Columbia Pictures. He was set to direct a remake of the 1981 fantasy film Clash of the Titans before the position went to Louis Leterrier, director of The Incredible Hulk.

In 2008 it was announced that Norrington would direct a reboot of The Crow franchise. In 2010 it was reported he would direct and write the supernatural action thriller The Lost Patrol, to be distributed by Legendary Pictures.

In December 2011, Norrington revealed in an interview that, for the past year, he'd been working on Untitled Norrington Genre Project #1, based on a feature film script he wrote in April 2008 for that year's Script Frenzy challenge. Centering on car chases, it was said to feature both live-action footage and scale models for greenscreen shots. Norrington revealed he was doing most of the work himself, as he did in his 2001 film The Last Minute.

== Unrealised projects ==
Norrington has had several unrealised projects throughout his career, listed here in roughly chronological order. During a career that has spanned over 20 years, he has worked on projects which never progressed beyond the pre-production stage under his direction. Many of them were produced after he left production.

In 1999, Norrington was offered to direct Blade II, the sequel to his 1998 film. He turned it down, and the studio hired Guillermo del Toro instead.

In 2001, Norrington became attached to direct John Sayles' long-in-development script adaptation Brother Termite.

Also in 2001, Norrington was attached to Dimension Films's Ghost Rider before it was acquired by Columbia Pictures. It was eventually released in 2007, directed by Mark Steven Johnson.

In 2001, Norrington announced he had agreed to direct a film based on The Hands of Shang-Chi: Master of Kung Fu, a film adaptation based on the Marvel character Shang-Chi. He described it as "a real honest-to-goodness martial arts film, rather than a film that simply has martial arts in it". In 2004, it was announced that Ang Lee had been brought on as producer. In 2005, it was announced that Stan Lee had agreed to executive produce the film for DreamWorks, with Yuen Woo-ping directing from a Bruce McKenna screenplay. In 2005, Avi Arad stated that he thought that a PG-13 adaptation was possible. In 2006, Ang Lee confirmed his and Yuen's continued involvement with the project. In December 2018, a different film adaptation of Shang-Chi was announced, with a script by David Callaham, without Norrington.

Shortly after Warner Bros. acquired the rights in 2002, Norrington was slated to direct a remake to the 1988 film Akira, with James Robinson writing the screenplay and Dan Lin producing. Norrington planned to make it more appealing to Western audiences by making Kaneda and Tetsuo brothers. Following The League of Extraordinary Gentlemen underperformed at the box office in 2003, which both Norrington and Robinson were also on, the project was put on hold.

In 2003, Norrington's The League of Extraordinary Gentlemen was intended to spawn a film franchise based on further titles in the original comic book series, but there was little enthusiasm for a sequel due to underperformance at the box office. In 2013, after the sequel was scrapped, it was reported that Fox was ordering a pilot for the television version of The League of Extraordinary Gentlemen with Michael Green as writer and executive producer. If the project went to series, Norrington and showrunner Erwin Stoff would have executive produced. Neither Moore nor O'Neill would be producers on the series. It had also been reported that the pilot episode would still be broadcast, even if Fox opted not to green-light the series. Only a couple years after news of the television series ceased, The Tracking Board reported, on 26 May 2015 that 20th Century Fox and Davis Entertainment had agreed to develop a reboot film with hopes of launching a new franchise. The report stated that a search was underway for a director who could help "continue to develop the reboot". John Davis told Collider in an interview that the reboot would be a female-centric film. Since then, there have been no further announcements.

Norrington planned to direct an action film titled Tick Tock starring Jennifer Lopez and Samuel L. Jackson before it was cancelled due to the 9/11 attacks.

In 2007, Norrington was set to direct the remake of the 1981 fantasy film Clash of the Titans. However, he was unsure about his direction for the project because he did not grow up with the original. Louis Leterrier, who did, contacted him through their shared agent about replacing him. Leterrier's film was released in 2010.

In 2008, it was announced that Norrington would direct a reboot of The Crow franchise. He left the film by 2013 and was replaced by F. Javier Gutiérrez. By July 2015, Gutiérrez had left the project and was replaced by Corin Hardy. Hardy also left the project on 31 May 2018, leaving the film in limbo. The Crow reboot was eventually released in 2024, without Norrington’s involvement.

In 2010, Norrington was going to direct and write the supernatural action thriller The Lost Patrol to be distributed by Legendary Pictures.

== Independent filmmaking (2011–present) ==
Following his departure from studio filmmaking, Norrington has focused on independent projects produced single-handedly from his home studio. In 2018, Blade co-star Stephen Dorff mentioned Norrington was "making a movie at his house with miniatures," though Dorff was conflating three separate DIY projects Norrington was working on.

As of November 2025, Norrington is in post-production on The Migrant, a feature-length science fiction film about robots, produced for approximately $50,000. The film combines live action, practical effects, and CGI, with a 7.1 soundtrack. Norrington has described it as "the best experience of my life" and estimates completion within a year.

Norrington's approach to independent filmmaking emphasises cost-effectiveness and self-sufficiency. He taught himself CGI using free software, records sound on affordable equipment, and built his own camera crane from timber purchased at Home Depot. His production methodology allows him to create feature films on micro-budgets while maintaining complete creative control.

== Filmography ==
Year	Title	Director	Writer	Producer	Notes
1994	Death Machine	Yes	Yes	Associate	
1998	Blade	Yes	No	No	Also made a cameo as Morbius in a deleted scene
2001	The Last Minute	Yes	Yes	Yes	
2003	The League of Extraordinary Gentlemen	Yes	No	No	
