= The Secret River (TV series) =

2015 Australian miniseries

- DVD cover
- Genre: Historical drama
- Written by: Jan Sardi & Mac Gudgeon
- Directed by: Daina Reid
- Starring: Oliver Jackson-Cohen; Sarah Snook; Lachy Hulme; Tim Minchin; Samuel Johnson; Rhys Muldoon
- Composer: Burkhard Dallwitz
- Country of origin: Australia
- Original language: English
- No. of episodes: 2

Production
- Executive producers: Mark Ruse; Sue Masters; Carole Sklan; Greer Simpkin
- Producers: Stephen Luby; Daina Reid; Lesley Parker
- Cinematography: Bruce Young
- Editor: Denise Haratzis

Original release
- Network: ABC
- Release: 14 June – 21 June 2015

The Secret River is an Australian television drama screened on ABC in June 2015. This two-part miniseries is based on the novel of the same name written by Kate Grenville. It follows the story of young couple, William and Sal Thornhill, who are transported to the new colony of New South Wales in 1805, giving a look into the colonisation of Australia and the escalating conflict between the original Indigenous inhabitants and the newly arrived white convicts and settlers.

== Cast ==
- Oliver Jackson-Cohen as William Thornhill
- Sarah Snook as Sal Thornhill
- Lachy Hulme as Thomas Blackwood
- Tim Minchin as Smasher
- Samuel Johnson as Saggity
- Trevor Jamieson as Gumang
- Huw Higginson as Alexander King
- Rhys Muldoon as Lord Loveday
- Rory Potter as Willie Thornhill
- Finn Scicluna-O'Prey as Dickie Thornhill
- Genevieve Lemon as Mrs. Herring
- Clarence Ryan as Greybeard's Warrior #1
- Natasha Wanganeen
