= Sarah Snook =

Australian actress (born 1987)

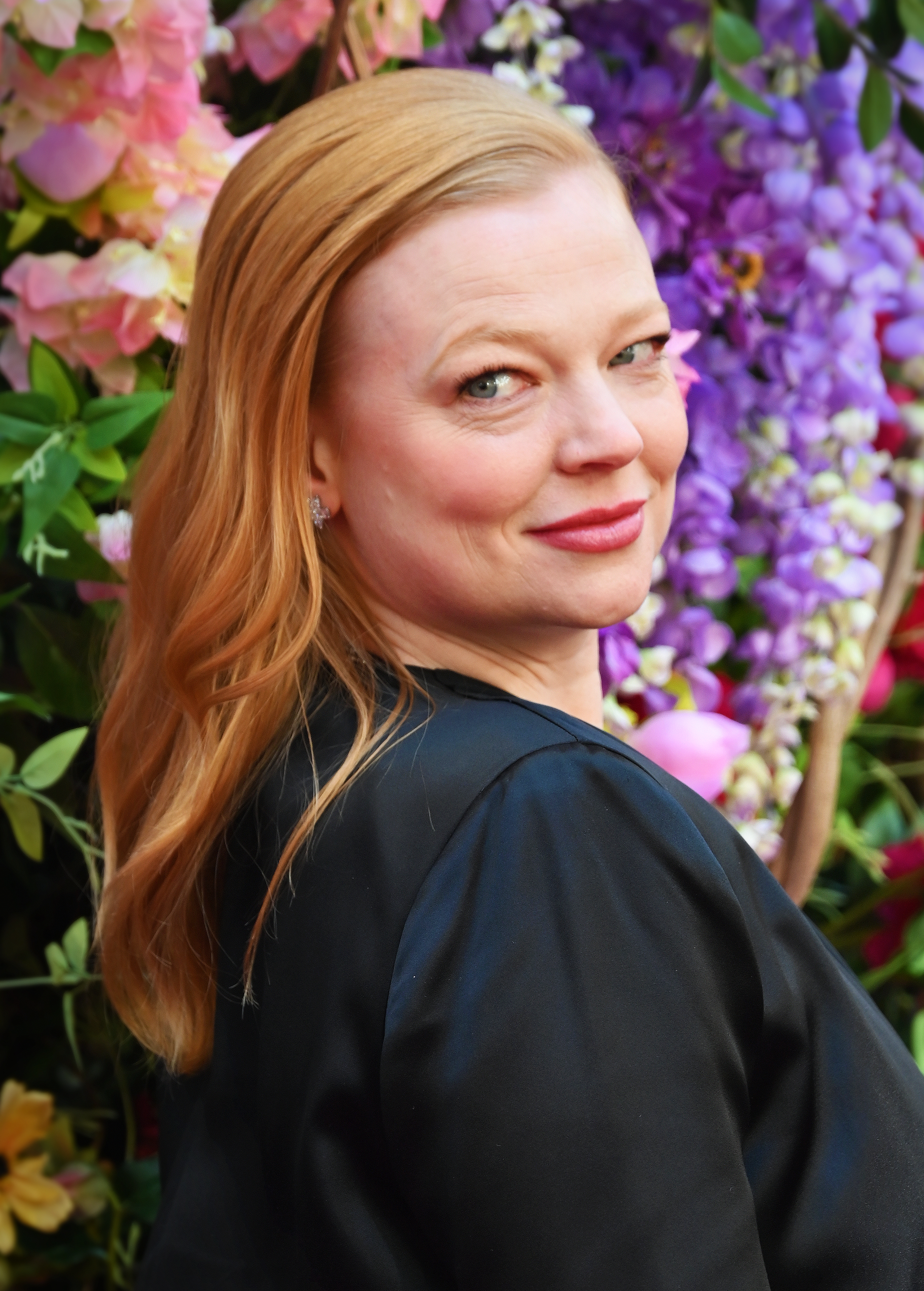
- Snook in 2025
- Born: Sarah Ruth Snook; 1 December 1987 (age 38); Adelaide, South Australia
- Education: National Institute of Dramatic Art (BFA)
- Occupation: Actress
- Years active: 2008–present
- Spouse: Dave Lawson (m. 2021)
- Children: 1
- Awards: Full list

Sarah Ruth Snook (/snuːk/; born 1 December 1987) is an Australian actress. Known for her work on screen and stage, her accolades include six AACTA Awards, a Primetime Emmy Award, a Tony Award, two Golden Globe Awards and two Actor Awards.

A graduate of the National Institute of Dramatic Art, Snook first gained recognition for her performances in the films Sisters of War (2010), Not Suitable for Children (2012), These Final Hours (2013), and Predestination (2014). Her breakthrough came with the role of Shiv Roy in the HBO drama series Succession (2018–2023), for which she won the Primetime Emmy Award for Outstanding Lead Actress in a Drama Series. She subsequently appeared in the animated film Memoir of a Snail (2024) and the Peacock limited series All Her Fault (2025), the later of which earned her a nomination for the Primetime Emmy Award for Outstanding Lead Actress in a Limited Series or Movie.

On stage, Snook starred in the West End and Broadway productions of The Picture of Dorian Gray (2024–2025), for which she won the Laurence Olivier Award and the Tony Award for Best Lead Actress in a Play. Her other theatre credits include roles in King Lear (2009), The Master Builder (2016) and Saint Joan (2018).

== Early life and education ==
Sarah Ruth Snook was born on 1 December 1987 in Adelaide, South Australia, and grew up in the suburb of Eden Hills. She has two older sisters. Her father, a swimming-pool salesman, and her mother, an aged care provider, divorced when she was young.

She attended St John's Grammar School in Belair and won a drama scholarship to Scotch College in Torrens Park. Her first paying job was as a fairy at children's birthday parties.

In 2008, she graduated from Sydney's National Institute of Dramatic Art (NIDA).

== Career ==
=== 2009–2017: Early work ===
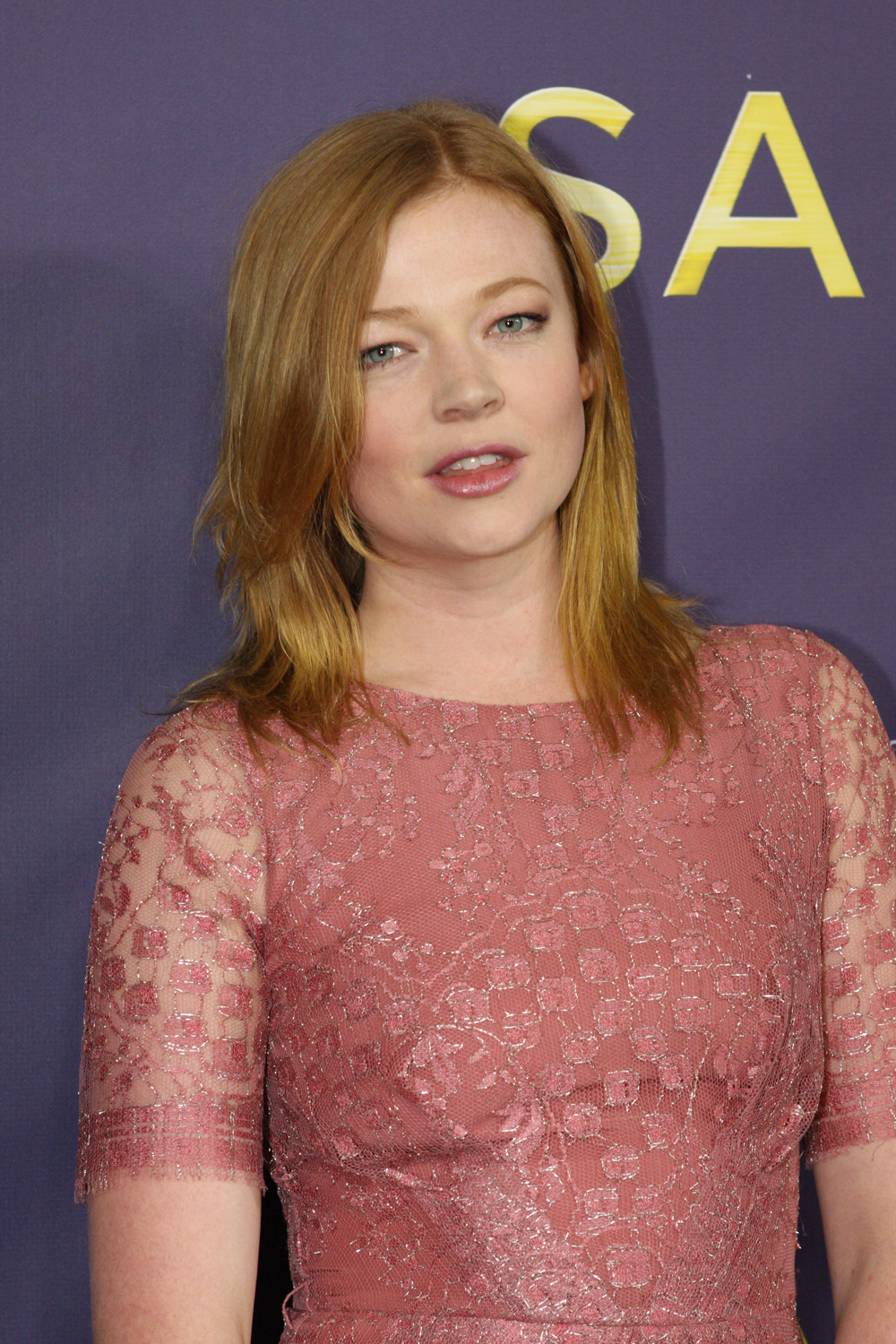
Snook at the premiere of The Sapphires in 2012

While at NIDA, Snook performed in stage productions of Macbeth and Gallipoli. She subsequently appeared in King Lear with the State Theatre Company of South Australia in 2009. She garnered further success with roles in a string of Australian films, including Sisters of War (2010), Not Suitable for Children (2012), These Final Hours (2013), and Predestination (2014). Snook won two AACTA Awards for her performances in Sisters of War and Predestination. She also earned recognition for starring in the supernatural horror film Jessabelle (2014). Snook then portrayed Andrea Cunningham in Danny Boyle's biopic Steve Jobs (2015), starring Michael Fassbender and Kate Winslet. That same year, she acted in Jocelyn Moorhouse's period drama The Dressmaker, also starring Winslet and Judy Davis, for which she was nominated for the AACTA Award for Best Actress in a Supporting Role. She appeared in the biopic The Glass Castle (2017), starring Brie Larson and based on the 2005 memoir of the same name.

In 2016, Snook appeared in an episode of the Netflix science fiction anthology series Black Mirror, titled "Men Against Fire", alongside Malachi Kirby, Madeline Brewer, and Michael Kelly. Also that year, she made her West End debut playing the role of Hilde Wangel in a revival of Henrik Ibsen's play The Master Builder opposite Ralph Fiennes at the Old Vic. Paul Taylor from The Independent hailed Snook's performance writing, "Sarah Snook, the young Australian star, is a disarmingly direct, deep-voiced and uninhibited as Hilde in an assured [and] striking performance". Snook returned to the stage in 2018, where she portrayed Joan of Arc in the Sydney Theatre Company's production of George Bernard Shaw's Saint Joan. Her performance was hailed by John Sand of the Sydney Morning Herald, who described her performance as "beyond riveting" and said that "Snook catches the untamed bravado of a teenager fired with passion".

=== 2018–2023: Breakthrough with Succession ===
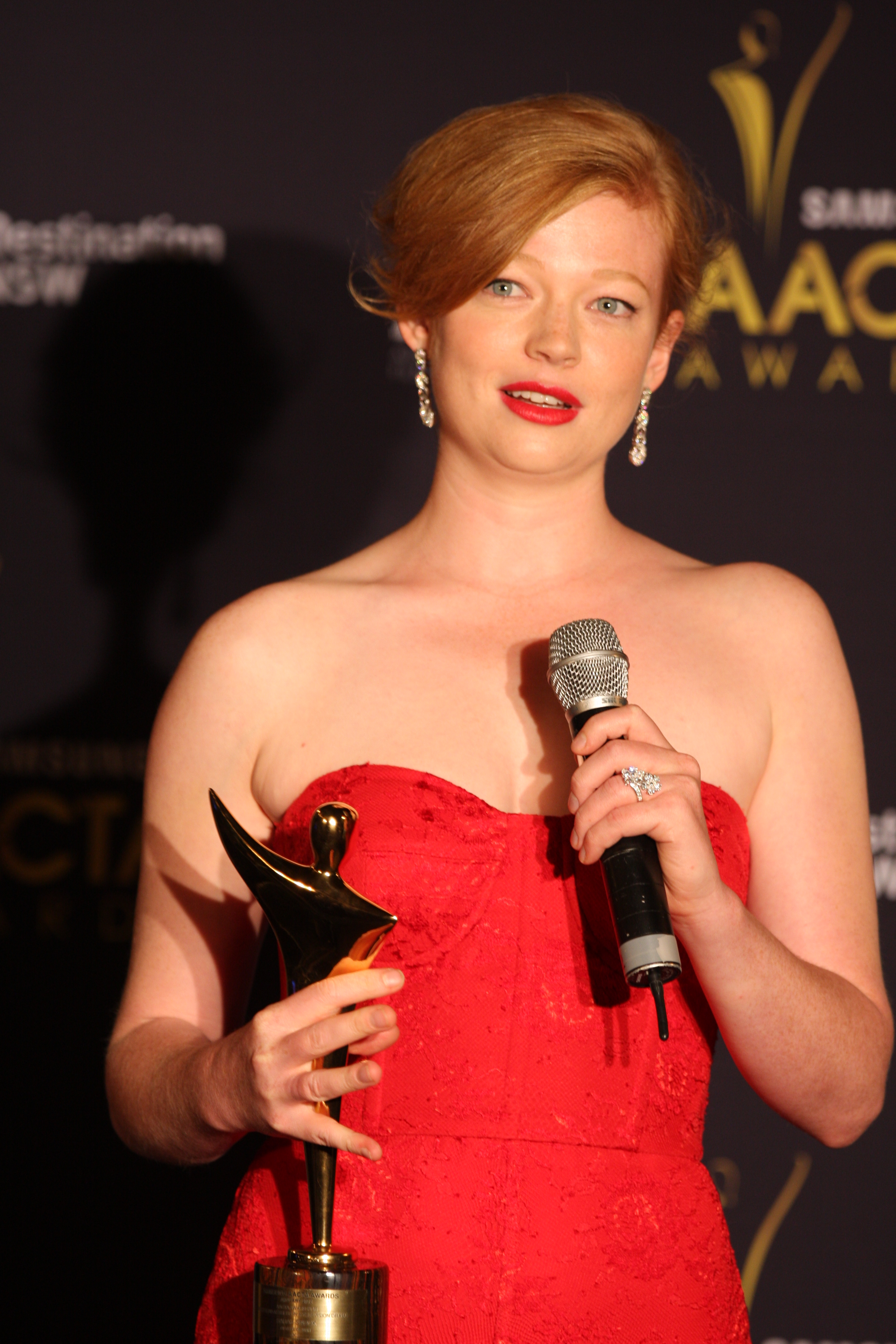
Snook at the AACTA Awards in 2012

From 2018 to 2023, Snook gained prominence for her lead role as Siobhan "Shiv" Roy in the HBO drama series Succession. The role earned her widespread critical acclaim and numerous accolades, including the Primetime Emmy Award for Outstanding Lead Actress in a Drama Series, the Screen Actors Guild Award for Outstanding Performance by an Ensemble in a Drama Series, and two Golden Globe Awards, the first for Best Supporting Actress – Series, Miniseries or Television Film followed by a win for Best Actress – Television Series Drama.

In 2020, Snook acted in the comedy film An American Pickle, opposite Seth Rogen, and in Kornél Mundruczó's marital drama film Pieces of a Woman. In December 2021, she replaced Elisabeth Moss as the lead in the horror-thriller film Run Rabbit Run, directed by Daina Reid. The film received a 38% on Rotten Tomatoes with her performance receiving mixed reviews. Michael Sun of The Guardian wrote, "Snook, of course, is typically excellent, fresh from her turn as Succession's petulant, scheming Shiv Roy in another spiky role here – but even her performance, as it heightens towards a crazed delirium, recalls Toni Collette's in Hereditary". Monica Castillo of Roger Ebert.com, praised Snook's performance describing it as "marvelous departure from Succession". For her performance in the film, she received her third nomination for the AACTA Award for Best Actress in a Leading Role.

In January 2022, Snook was cast alongside Zach Galifianakis and Elizabeth Banks in the comedy drama film The Beanie Bubble, which was co-directed by Kristin Gore and Damian Kulash. Rotten Tomatoes gave the film 46%. Wendy Idle of The Guardian described her as being "underused" in the film. Frank Scheck of The Hollywood Reporter wrote, "Snook displays a softer side than in her celebrated Succession turn with yet another portrayal revolving around a ruthless businessman." In 2022, Snook narrated the Netflix documentary film Kangaroo Valley.

=== 2024–present: Return to theatre ===
In 2024, Snook returned to the West End portraying all 26 roles in the Sydney Theatre Company's production of The Picture of Dorian Gray at the Theatre Royal Haymarket. Arifa Akbar of The Guardian praised Snook on her performance citing the complexity of the role: "It is a juggling act of high order for Snook. She must perform in real time, react to the recorded footage and manipulate the technology herself in some scenes. She speaks in dialogue but also narrates omnisciently. Some scenes require athleticism, others sudden stillness. It demands an exacting synchronicity and she gets it pitch perfect, powering through 26 characters." Snook's performance earned further acclaim upon the play's Broadway transfer at the Music Box Theatre the following year. Naveen Kumar of The Washington Post praised her "extraordinary grasp on the physics of performing for stage and screen, often simultaneously. She can explode like a firework, containing it for the camera while filling the room with sparks." Snook won the Laurence Olivier Award for Best Actress and the Tony Award for Best Actress in a Play for her performance.

She also voiced the protagonist in the 2024 stop-motion animated film Memoir of a Snail directed by Adam Elliot. Her voice performance drew praise from critics. Nate Richard of Collider wrote, "Snook gives one of the best voice performances of the year. Never once does she feel like she is haphazardly reading lines into a microphone. She pours so much emotion and soulfulness into Grace, and it pairs perfectly with Elliot's stunning animation." Manuel Betancourt of The Los Angeles Times remarked, "The filmmaker is helped by Snook's oft-deadpan delivery. Her voice makes the many outlandish events she describes feel grounded in a reality that refuses the call to pity. There is a push instead toward empathy, toward imagining and caring for the inner worlds of those we might otherwise disregard." For her performance, she was awarded her second AACTA award for Best Actress in a Leading Role, marking the first time the award went to a voice performance. The film was nominated for Best Animated Feature at the 97th Academy Awards.

In 2025, Snook starred in and served as an executive producer on the Peacock limited series All Her Fault. Her performance drew acclaim from critics, with Karl Quinn of the Sydney Morning Herald writing, "It's Sarah Snook who anchors everything, and she's marvelous. She's in tears almost from beginning to end, but never a victim. She's terrified, baffled, furious, resolved, and always utterly believable." She won the Critics' Choice Television Award for Best Actress in a Movie/Miniseries, and her second AACTA International Award for Best Actress in a Series. Additionally, she was nominated for the Golden Globe Award for Best Actress – Miniseries or Television Film, the Primetime Emmy Award for Outstanding Lead Actress in a Limited or Anthology Series or Movie, and the Screen Actors Guild Award for Outstanding Performance by a Female Actor in a Miniseries or Television Movie.

== Personal life ==
In 2020, Snook began dating Australian comedian Dave Lawson, whom she married in the backyard of her Brooklyn home in 2021. She gave birth to a daughter in May 2023. Snook is also the godmother of her Succession co-star Kieran Culkin's son.

== Acting credits ==
Key
†	Denotes projects that have not yet been released

=== Film ===
Year	Title	Role	Notes	Ref.
2010	Crystal Jam	Crystal	Short film	
2011	The Best Man	Isla	Short film	
2011	Sleeping Beauty	Flatmate		
2012	Not Suitable for Children	Stevie		
2013	These Final Hours	Mandy's Mother		
2014	Predestination	Jane / John		
2014	Jessabelle	Jessie Laurent		
2015	The Dressmaker	Gertrude "Trudy" Pratt		
2015	Oddball	Emily Marsh		
2015	Holding the Man	Pepe Trevor		
2015	Steve Jobs	Andrea "Andy" Cunningham		
2017	The Glass Castle	Lori Walls		
2018	Winchester	Marian Marriott		
2018	Brothers' Nest	Sandy		
2020	An American Pickle	Sarah Greenbaum		
2020	Pieces of a Woman	Suzanne		
2023	Run Rabbit Run	Sarah	Also executive producer	
2023	The Beanie Bubble	Sheila Warner		
2024	Memoir of a Snail	Grace Pudel (voice)		

=== Television ===
Year	Title	Role	Notes	Ref.
2009	All Saints	Sophie	Episode: "Curve Balls"	
2010	Sisters of War	Lorna Whyte	Television film	
2011	Packed to the Rafters	Jodi Webb	2 episodes	
2011	Blood Brothers	Debbie Franklin	Television film	
2011	My Place	Minna Muller	Episode: "Henry 1878"	
2011	Spirited	Antonia	10 episodes	
2013	Redfern Now	Officer Sarah Donaldson	Episode: "Dogs of War"	
2014	The Moodys	Louise	Episode: "Happy Anniversary Kevin & Maree"	
2015	The Secret River	Sal Thornhill	Main role; 2 episodes	
2015	The Beautiful Lie	Anna	Main role; 6 episodes	
2016	Black Mirror	Medina	Episode: "Men Against Fire"	
2018–2023	Succession	Siobhan "Shiv" Roy	Main role; 39 episodes	
2019	Robot Chicken	Rose the Horse / Midge (voices)	Episode: "Snoopy Camino Lindo in: Quick and Dirty Squirrel Shot"	
2020	Soulmates	Nikki	Episode: "Watershed"	
2023	Koala Man	Vicky (voice)	Main role; 8 episodes	
2025	All Her Fault	Marissa Irvine	Main role; also executive producer	

=== Theatre ===
Year	Title	Role	Venue	Ref.
2009	King Lear	Cordelia	State Theatre Company of South Australia	
2010	S-27	May	Griffin Theatre Company	
2016	The Master Builder	Hilde Wangel	The Old Vic, West End debut	
2018	Saint Joan	Joan of Arc	Sydney Theatre Company, Australia	
2024	The Picture of Dorian Gray	Dorian Gray, et al.	Theatre Royal Haymarket, West End	
2025	The Picture of Dorian Gray	Dorian Gray, et al.	Music Box Theatre, Broadway debut	

== Awards and nominations ==
Snook has received various accolades in her career. In her early career, she received attention and AACTA Awards for her performances in Sisters of War (2010) and Predestination (2014), and additional nominations for Not Suitable for Children (2012), The Dressmaker (2015), The Secret River (2015), and The Beautiful Lie (2015). Snook's breakthrough role as Shiv Roy in the HBO television series Succession (2018–2023) earned her two Critics' Choice Television Awards (Best Supporting Actress in a Drama Series in 2022 and Best Actress in a Drama Series in 2024), two Golden Globe Awards (Best Supporting Actress – Series, Miniseries or Television Film in 2022 and Best Actress in a Television Series – Drama in 2024), a Primetime Emmy Award for Outstanding Lead Actress in a Drama Series in 2024 (after two nominations for Outstanding Supporting Actress in a Drama Series), and two Screen Actors Guild Awards for Outstanding Performance by an Ensemble in a Drama Series in 2022 and 2024 (also nominated both years for Outstanding Performance by a Female Actor in a Drama Series). She won a third and fourth AACTA Award for Succession and Memoir of a Snail (2024); the latter win made her the first to receive the Best Actress prize for a voice-over role.

Snook appeared on West End and Broadway as multiple characters in the play The Picture of Dorian Gray, winning respectively the Laurence Olivier Award for Best Actress and Tony Award for Best Actress in a Play.

In January 2026, it was announced that Snook would receive the Trailblazer Award at the 15th annual AACTA Awards. The award celebrates Australians who are forging unique and influential pathways in the global industry. In May 2026, she was awarded an honorary Master of Fine Arts degree from NIDA.

== See also ==
- List of Primetime Emmy Award winners
- List of Golden Globe winners
