= Predestination (film) =

2014 film directed by the Spierig brothers

- Theatrical release poster
- Directed by: The Spierig Brothers
- Screenplay by: The Spierig Brothers
- Based on: " '—All You Zombies—'" by Robert A. Heinlein
- Produced by: The Spierig Brothers; Tim McGahan; Paddy McDonald
- Starring: Ethan Hawke; Sarah Snook; Noah Taylor
- Cinematography: Ben Nott
- Edited by: Matt Villa
- Music by: Peter Spierig
- Production companies: Screen Australia; Screen Queensland; Blacklab Entertainment; Wolfhound Pictures
- Distributed by: Pinnacle Films; Stage 6 Films
- Release dates: 8 March 2014 (SXSW Film Festival); 28 August 2014 (Australia)
- Running time: 97 minutes
- Country: Australia
- Language: English
- Budget: $5 million
- Box office: $5.4 million

Predestination is a 2014 Australian science fiction thriller film written and directed by Michael and Peter Spierig. The film stars Ethan Hawke, Sarah Snook, and Noah Taylor, and is based on the 1959 short story " '—All You Zombies—'" by Robert A. Heinlein. It follows a time traveling agent who is sent on his final mission to apprehend the elusive "Fizzle Bomber", a terrorist responsible for dozens of bombings across history, before his next attack.

== Plot ==
In 1975, a time-travelling agent, whose face is not seen, suffers severe burns while trying and failing to disarm a bomb in a public building's basement. An unseen person helps him activate his time-travel device, called a "field kit", allowing him to escape to his agency's headquarters in 1992. He receives reconstructive surgery for his burns, but is told he will now look and sound different. He is further warned about the risk of mental instability from his long career. Despite this, the agent is determined to capture the "Fizzle Bomber", the failed bombing's elusive perpetrator.

Once he recovers, the agent is sent on his final mission before retirement and goes undercover as a bartender in 1970 New York City, where he meets John, a bitter columnist who writes under the pen name "The Unmarried Mother". When pressed on how he writes confession stories so well, John begins telling his life story.

A baby was found on the steps of a Cleveland orphanage in 1945, where she was taken in and given the name Jane. Jane excelled both physically and academically in high school, and upon graduation was recruited by Agent Robertson to join the space program as a concubine, but was disqualified after a medical examination. In college, Jane fell in love with a mysterious man, but was abandoned shortly into the relationship. Jane went back to Robertson to try to join the space program, but Robertson admitted that he was using the space program as a front to recruit Jane for an elite covert agency that recruits people with no past and no certain future. Jane joined the agency, but was forced to drop out when she discovered she was pregnant. Jane gave birth to a baby girl at a hospital, telling the baby "you are the best thing that's ever happened to me", but, during the delivery doctors discovered that Jane was intersex. Complications during delivery had rendered her female organs unviable, and the physicians began the process of gender reassignment surgery. Jane spent almost a year undergoing further treatment to present as male, during which time her baby was kidnapped from the hospital by an older man. After being rejected from the space program again, Jane renamed himself John and relocated to New York City, eventually becoming a columnist and still harboring resentment toward the man who impregnated and abandoned him.

When John finishes his story, the agent reveals that he works for the Temporal Bureau, in which Robertson is either a high-ranking officer or the head. He offers John the chance to kill his mysterious lover, who the agent thinks may be the Fizzle Bomber, in exchange for John joining the bureau as an agent. Together, they go back to 1963, where John encounters and falls in love with Jane (his past self), realizing that he was his past self's lover all along. John, determined to change the past, goes ahead with the relationship and vows not to abandon himself as Jane.

Meanwhile, the agent illegally returns to 1975 and helps his wounded past self, which Robertson allows as long as the agent kidnaps Jane's baby and delivers it to the Cleveland orphanage in 1945, completing the temporal paradox that makes John both of his own parents. Returning to 1963, the agent compels John to leave Jane and join the agency in 1985, as their troubled past is what will make them so effective at saving lives. They travel to headquarters, where John passes out and is hospitalized.

Informed his field kit will decommission after one final jump, the agent retires to New York City in 1975, but the kit fails to decommission. With information left for him by Robertson, he finds the Fizzle Bomber, only to his horror to discover that it is his future self. The bomber says that all his bombings were designed to prevent much greater disasters, and that the field kit still working is evidence that he was predestined to become the bomber. The bomber gives the agent a chance not to kill him and break the cycle, but the agent shoots him.

The agent records a message to be delivered to John at headquarters when he wakes up in 1985, repeating the line "you are the best thing that's ever happened to me" that Jane told her baby. He then takes off his robe to reveal scars from gender reassignment surgery, confirming he is an older John—an orchestrated paradox created by Robertson.

== Cast ==
- Ethan Hawke as Agent Doe (listed in film's end credits as "The Barkeep"), an agent of the Temporal Bureau obsessed with catching the Fizzle Bomber
- Sarah Snook as Jane/John (listed in the film's end credits as "The Unmarried Mother"), a confession stories author whom the Agent recruits into the Temporal Bureau
  - Monique Heath as 10-year-old Jane
  - Olivia Sprague as 5-year-old Jane
- Noah Taylor as Mr. Robertson of the Temporal Bureau
- Kuni Hashimoto as the Agent's doctor
- Christopher Kirby as Mr. Miles, an employee of the Temporal Bureau
- Christopher Sommers as Mr. Miller, an employee of the Temporal Bureau
- Cate Wolfe as Beth, the orphanage director who finds baby Jane
- Ben Prendergast as Dr. Clarke, a doctor who frequents the orphanage
- Christopher Stollery as the SpaceCorp interviewer
- Madeleine West as Mrs. Stapleton, who does psychological testing for SpaceCorp
- Tyler Coppin as Dr. Heinlein, Jane/John's doctor
- Freya Stafford as Alice, an antique store clerk
- Christopher Bunworth as Jerry, the Agent's fellow barkeep
- Tony Nikolakopoulos as Driver

== Production ==
=== Development ===
The film is based on the 1959 short story " '—All You Zombies—'" by Robert A. Heinlein. At one point in an internal monologue in the film, the narrator quotes the story title. On 14 May 2012, the Spierig brothers—who had already written a screenplay—were announced as the directors of Predestination. Peter Spierig explained in August 2014 that they remained close to Heinlein's 1959 short story. They did not try to take apart the logic of the more than 50-year-old narrative: "... so we worked on the [premise] that if there was a way to pick apart the logic, over that time it would have been done by now. We kind of say, 'let's trust the short story and trust that logic', so we stuck very closely to it."

Ethan Hawke was selected for the lead role, while Wolfhound Pictures and Blacklab Entertainment collaborated to produce the film. Hawke explained in November 2014 that he is a longtime fan of the science fiction genre, but he prefers its human elements, rather than special effects:

Whether it's Robert Heinlein, Kurt Vonnegut, Philip K. Dick, H. G. Wells or whoever ... that kind of mind-bendy science-fiction where you can really attack themes in a new way. And when I read Predestination it was like: "What the f*** did I just read?!"

=== Distribution ===
Arclight Films had bought the international rights to the film, and on 18 May 2012, Tiberius Film attained the German rights to the film from Arclight. On 23 May 2012, Sony Pictures Worldwide Acquisitions acquired the American and some international rights to the film.

=== Financing ===
On 5 September 2012, Screen Australia announced that it would finance the film as part of a A$4.8 million (US$3.6 million) investment in three feature films.

=== Casting ===
On 28 February 2013, Sarah Snook signed on to star in one of the film's lead roles, followed by Noah Taylor, who joined the cast of the film on 13 May 2013. Also in 2013, Pinnacle Films secured the Australian and New Zealand distribution rights to the film.

=== Filming ===
On 19 February 2013, pre-production was scheduled to begin on 25 February 2013, while shooting was scheduled to begin on 8 April 2013 in Melbourne, for a duration of six weeks. By 13 May 2013, filming was underway. Filming predominantly took place at the Docklands Studios Melbourne facility, located approximately 1.5 km (0.93 mi) from the Melbourne CBD. Some scenes were shot at the Abbotsford Convent, located in the inner-city Melbourne suburb of Abbotsford, the foyer of 333 Collins Street, the University of Melbourne old quad, and at the RMIT Design Hub.

In regard to Snook, the Spierig brothers explained to the media that they always seek to cast a lesser-known actor in their films. Michael Spierig later compared Snook's acting ability to that of fellow Australian actress Cate Blanchett. They also said that they prefer to film in Australia, with its rebates and incentives, but will film in any geographical location.

== Release ==
Predestination's global premiere was held on 8 March 2014 at the SXSW Film Festival in Austin, Texas, US. The film was then selected for the opening night gala of the Melbourne International Film Festival (MIFF), held at the Hamer Hall venue on 31 July 2014 in Melbourne, Australia. The MIFF promotional material described Predestination as a "distinctive blend of sci-fi, noir and crime fiction with a Bukowskian streak." The Sydney premiere of the film, which also featured a live Q&A session with the directors, occurred on 6 August 2014 at the Palace Verona cinema.

The film went on general release in the United Kingdom on 13 February 2015. Following the release of two trailers, and a seven-minute excerpt that was published on 3 December 2014, Predestination premiered on 9 January 2015 in the United States.

== Critical response ==
On review aggregator Rotten Tomatoes, the film had a score of 84% based on 111 reviews, with an average rating of 6.9 out of 10. The site's critical consensus stated: "Fun genre fare with uncommon intelligence, Predestination serves as a better-than-average sci-fi adventure—and offers a starmaking turn from Sarah Snook." The film also has a score of 69 out of 100 on Metacritic based on reviews from 28 critics, indicating "generally favorable reviews".

Variety magazine's review of the film called it an "entrancingly strange time-travel saga" that "succeeds in teasing the brain and touching the heart even when its twists and turns keep multiplying well past the point of narrative sustainability." In anticipation of the MIFF opening night's screening, the Sydney Morning Herald's National Film Editor Karl Quinn called Snook's performance a "career-making role". In terms of the plot, Quinn states that it is "intriguing" even though it could "unravel at the slightest tug on a thread of loose logic."

The lead character was variously described as transgender or intersex in different media articles. Hawke told The Guardian that the narrative is relevant to all people: "There's something about Predestination that actually does get at identity, for me".

=== Accolades ===
Predestination won the 2014 John Hinde Award for Excellence in Science-Fiction Writing in the AWGIE Awards.

Award	Category	Subject	Result
AACTA Award (4th)	Best Film	Paddy McDonald	Nominated
AACTA Award (4th)	Best Film	Tim McGahan	Nominated
AACTA Award (4th)	Best Film	The Spierig Brothers	Nominated
AACTA Award (4th)	Best Direction	The Spierig Brothers	Nominated
AACTA Award (4th)	Best Adapted Screenplay	The Spierig Brothers	Nominated
AACTA Award (4th)	Best Actress	Sarah Snook	Won
AACTA Award (4th)	Best Cinematography	Ben Nott	Won
AACTA Award (4th)	Best Editing	Matt Villa	Won
AACTA Award (4th)	Best Original Music Score	Peter Spierig	Nominated
AACTA Award (4th)	Best Production Design	Matthew Putland	Won
AACTA Award (4th)	Best Costume Design	Wendy Cork	Nominated
AFCA Awards	Best Film		Nominated
AFCA Awards	Best Director	The Spierig brothers	Nominated
AFCA Awards	Best Screenplay	The Spierig brothers	Nominated
AFCA Awards	Best Actress	Sarah Snook	Nominated
AFCA Awards	Best Cinematography	Ben Nott	Nominated
ACS Award	Award of Distinction	Ben Nott	Won
FCCA Awards	Best Film	Paddy McDonald	Nominated
FCCA Awards	Best Film	Tim McGahan	Nominated
FCCA Awards	Best Film	The Spierig brothers	Nominated
FCCA Awards	Best Director	The Spierig brothers	Nominated
FCCA Awards	Best Screenplay	The Spierig brothers	Nominated
FCCA Awards	Best Actress	Sarah Snook	Won
FCCA Awards	Best Cinematography	Ben Nott	Nominated
FCCA Awards	Best Editing	Matt Villa	Won
FCCA Awards	Best Music Score	Peter Spierig	Nominated
FCCA Awards	Best Production Design	Matthew Putland	Won
Toronto After Dark Film Festival	Special Award for Best Sci-Fi Film		Won
Toronto After Dark Film Festival	Special Award for Best Screenplay	The Spierig brothers	Won
Toronto After Dark Film Festival	Audience Award for Best Feature Film	The Spierig brothers	2nd place

== See also ==
- "I'm My Own Grandpa", a song mentioned in Heinlein's story and partially heard in the film
- List of time travel works of fiction
