= Kidnapping in the United States =

Kidnapping is a crime in the United States. Throughout its history, a number of incidents have taken place.

== Prevalence ==
=== Adults ===
Kidnapping statistics for U.S. adults continue to remain elusive; the crime of kidnapping is not separately recorded by the Uniform Crime Report. In 2010, according to NCIC's Missing Person File, over 69,000 individuals were categorized as "person over the age of 21, not meeting the criteria for entry in any category who is missing and for whom there is a reasonable concern for his/her safety".

The federal government estimated around 70,000 missing persons above the age of 18 cases in 2001.

=== Children ===
The vast majority of child abduction cases in the United States are parental kidnapping, where one parent hides, takes or holds a child without the knowledge or consent of another parent or guardian. Depending on the state and the legal status of the family members, this might not be a criminal offense. In 1976, parental child abduction estimates (under narrower legal definitions) ranged from 15,000 to 60,000 cases per year.

By 1984, estimates of parental child snatchings in the United States ranged between 459,000 and 751,000 per year. In 2010, the US Department of Justice reported 200,000 cases of parental kidnapping; these comprised both domestic and international abductions.

Fewer than 350 people under the age of 21 have been abducted by strangers in the United States per year, on average, between 2010–2017. According to another source, only about 100 cases per year can be classified as abductions by strangers.

According to the State Department, between 2008 and 2017 an average of about 1,100 children were abducted from the U.S. to a foreign country. In 2017, 345 resulted in the department opening an international kidnapping case.

== Law ==
According to the Federal Kidnapping Act (18 U.S.C. 1201), whoever illegally confines, decoys, kidnaps, abducts, seizes or takes away a person and holds for ransom or prize can be considered as a criminal.

In some instances, it cannot be considered as kidnapping if the person is:

1. willingly transported by the parent.
2. taken by officers, employees as described in section 1114 as an officer or employee engaged in or on account of the performance of official duties for the United States Government.
3. foreign official, an internationally protected person as defined in section 1116, it includes the Chief of State or the political equivalent, President, Vice President, Prime Minister, Ambassador, Foreign Minister, or other officer of Cabinet rank or above of a foreign government, among others.

Kidnapping of a person can be punished by imprisonment up to life. If kidnapping resulted in the death of a person, it can be punished by execution or life imprisonment. Kidnapping someone who is 17 or under is considered child abduction since the United States legally defines a child as someone 17 or under.

The United States is a party to the Hague Convention on the Civil Aspects of International Child Abduction.

The Sean and David Goldman International Child Abduction Prevention and Return Act of 2014 allows the U.S. Secretary of State to sanction countries that do not cooperate with the return of abducted children, and to seek extradition of abducting parents. The law also set up the Transportation Security Administration's "do not depart" list.

== Prevention and response systems ==
- The Transportation Security Administration maintains a "do not depart" list for children at risk of parental abduction. Judges sitting on custody cases can add children to the list, though it is highly underutilized.
- Amber alerts can be issued to notify the public help locate abducted children and their abductors, typically transmitting a description of the people involved and sometimes a car or license plate number

== Notable cases ==
Date	Victim(s)	Abductor(s)	Location	Age of victim(s)	Outcome	Notes
1758	Mary Jemison	Seneca warriors	Adams County, Pennsylvania, US	12	Stayed with abductors	Jemison, a Caucasian child, was taken from her family by Seneca warriors. The only one not massacred in her family, Jemison was adopted into the Seneca tribe and lived the remainder of her life with them.
May 19, 1836	Cynthia Ann Parker	Comanches	Fort Parker, Texas, US	9	Stayed with abductors	Parker, a Caucasian child, was taken from her family by Comanches raiding their home in Fort Parker, Texas. She lived for 24 years among the Comanche and married a war chief, Peta Nocona. She gave birth to three children, including the last war chief of the Comanche, Quanah Parker.
March 16, 1860	Larcena Pennington and Mercedes Sais Quiroz	Apaches	Canoa Ranch, Arizona, US	23 (Pennington); 10 (Quiroz)	Released (Pennington); Released and rescued (Quiroz)	Pennington and her student Mercedes Sais Quiroz were abducted by Apaches. Later in the day Pennington was left for dead in the wilderness. Quiroz was freed in exchange for Apache prisoners.
July 1, 1874	Charley Ross	Bill Mosher and Joe Douglas	Germantown, Pennsylvania, US	4	Unknown	Charley Ross was the first American to be kidnapped for ransom that received wide public attention. The primary suspects were killed before they could be identified as the kidnappers and Ross was never found.
April 8, 1911	Elsie Paroubek	Unknown	Chicago, Illinois, US	5	Murdered	Paroubek was a Czech-American girl who disappeared while walking alone to her aunt's house (around the corner from where Elsie lived) in Chicago. Her body was found a month later in a drainage ditch. Several people, including Elsie's father and the police in charge of the investigation, believed gypsies (who had several camps in the area at the time) were involved.
August 23, 1912	Bobby Dunbar	Unknown	St. Landry Parish, Louisiana, US	4	Unknown	Bobby Dunbar was a child who disappeared near Swayze Lake. After an eight-month nationwide search, investigators found a child, claimed by Bobby's parents as their son, in the hands of William Cantwell Walters of Mississippi, who was convicted of kidnapping. In 2004, further investigation by Dunbar's granddaughter led to conclusive DNA proof that the child in Walters' custody was not the Dunbars' son and that the Walters had been wrongfully convicted.
December 15, 1927	Marion Parker	William Hickman	Los Angeles	12	Murdered	Parker, the daughter of a Los Angeles banker, was kidnapped and killed by William Hickman. A few days after being paid a small ransom, Hickman was arrested and tried. On October 19, 1928, Hickman was executed for his crime.
March 1, 1932	Charles Augustus Lindbergh, Jr.	Bruno Richard Hauptmann	East Amwell Township, New Jersey, US	1	Murdered	Charles was the son of famous American aviator, Charles Lindbergh. Dubbed "The Crime of the Century", on 1 March, the child was 20 months old when he was taken from his crib in his home. After a ransom negotiations were unsuccessful, the child's remains were found by a passing truck driver on 12 May. Hauptmann was convicted of the crime on 13 February 1935, and was sentenced to death, and was electrocuted on 3 April 1936. Congress passed the "Lindbergh Law", formally known as "The Federal Kidnapping Act of 1932", on 13 June 1932. The law was created to allow federal authorities step in and pursue kidnappers once they had crossed state lines with their victim.
May 15, 1930	Mary Agnes Moroney	Unknown	Chicago, Illinois, US	2	Unknown	Moroney was taken from her home by a woman who identified herself as "Julia Otis" and claimed to have been sent by a social worker. Her kidnapping is the oldest unsolved case of this nature in the files of the Chicago Missing Persons Bureau.
May 27, 1933	Mary McElroy	George McGee, Walter McGee, Clarence Click, and Clarence Stevens	Kansas City, Missouri, US	25	Released	McElroy, the daughter of City Manager Henry F. McElroy of Kansas City, was kidnapped and held for ransom. She was released unharmed after the ransom was paid and the four kidnappers were later apprehended and given life sentences.
November 9, 1933	Brooke Hart	Thomas Harold Thurmond and John M. Holmes	San Jose, California, US	22	Murdered	Hart, the son of a San Jose, California businessman, was kidnapped and murdered thereafter. His kidnappers were lynched by a mob.
April 25, 1934	June Robles	Unknown	Tucson, Arizona, US	6	Released/rescued	Robles was abducted and held for ransom. After negotiations between her parents and her captors, Robles was found unharmed on a highway after nineteen days in captivity. Only one arrest was made in connection with her abduction.
December 27, 1936	Charles Mattson	Unknown	Tacoma, Washington, US	10	Murdered	Mattson was abducted from his home and held for $28,000. He was found dead in January, 1937.
September 28, 1953	Robert "Bobby" Cosgrove Greenlease, Jr.	Bonnie Heady and Carl A. Hall	Kansas City, Missouri, US	6	Murdered	Greenlease was kidnapped and immediately murdered. The murderers demanded and were paid a $600,000 ransom by the boy's father, a wealthy automobile dealer. Notable in the case was that more than half of the ransom money was stolen by a corrupt police officer and never recovered.
July 4, 1956	Peter Weinberger	Angelo LaMarca	Westbury, New York, US	1 month	Released/died	LaMarca took the baby from his home for a $2,000 ransom. LaMarca told investigators he went to the first drop site the day after the kidnapping – with the baby in the car – but he was scared away by all of the press and police in the area. He drove away, abandoned the baby alive in some heavy brush just off a highway exit, and went home. A search of the area by Federal Bureau of Investigation (FBI) agents and Nassau County Police Department ensued. An FBI agent spotted a diaper pin – then the decomposed remains of Peter Weinberger. The Weinberger case also resulted in new legislation – signed by President Dwight D. Eisenhower – which reduced the FBI's waiting period in kidnapping cases from 7 days to 24 hours. LaMarca was executed in the electric chair on 7 August 1958.
December 4, 1972	Steven Stayner	Kenneth Parnell and Ervin Edward Murphy	Merced, California, US	7	Escaped	Stayner was kidnapped on his way home from school. He was raised as Parnell's son for 7 years until Parnell abducted another child, Timmy White, in 1980. The two boys escaped on March 1, 1980.
January 16, 1973	Anna Christian Waters	Unknown	Half Moon Bay, California, US	5	Unknown	Waters disappeared from her backyard; presumed abducted by her father but never found.
February 4, 1974	Patty Hearst	Symbionese Liberation Army	Berkeley, California, US	19	Stayed with abductors until arrested	Hearst, an heiress to the Hearst Corporation mass media fortune, was kidnapped from her apartment by a left-wing guerrilla group. She announced her allegiance to the group in April 1974, and on April 15, 1974, took part in a bank robbery. She is thought to have been a victim of Stockholm syndrome. Captured by the FBI in September 1975, Hearst was sentenced to 35 years in prison for bank robbery. She served 22 months and was released from prison on February 1, 1979. President Bill Clinton granted her a full pardon on January 20, 2001.
November 12, 1974	Jack Teich	Richard Warren Williams	Kings Point, New York, US	34	Released	Teich was kidnapped in his driveway in the evening after work. His abductors demanded and received a $750,000 ransom before the police lost sight of the retrieval. Years later, two men were tried for the crime; however, only one was convicted and served time. At the time, the ransom was the largest sum in the US.
May 19, 1977	Colleen Stan	Cameron Hooker	Red Bluff, California, US	20	Escaped	Stan was kidnapped by Hooker while hitchhiking. She was tortured and sexually abused over seven years until Hooker's wife, Janice, helped her escape in 1984.
June 12, 1977	Oklahoma girl scout murders	Unknown	Mayes County, Oklahoma, US	8–10	Murdered	The Oklahoma Girl Scout murders is an unresolved crime that occurred at Camp Scott. The victims were three Girl Scouts, who were raped and murdered and their bodies left in the woods near their tent at summer camp. Although the case was classified as "solved" when Gene Leroy Hart, a local jail escapee with a history of violence, was arrested and stood trial for the crime, he was acquitted. Thirty years later authorities conducted new DNA testing, but the results proved inconclusive, as the samples were too old.
1978	Christi and Bobby Baskin	Grandparents Marvin L. Maple and his wife	Murfreesboro, Tennessee	7–8	Found 20 years later	Children remained estranged
February 14, 1980	Timmy White	Kenneth Parnell	Ukiah, California, US	5	Escaped/rescued	White was abducted by Parnell who had previously abducted Steven Stayner 7 years earlier. Stayner helped White escape on March 1, 1980.
1981	Bryon Anthony "Bizzy Bone" McCane II	Byron McCane	Columbus, Ohio, US	5	Rescued	McCane was kidnapped by his stepfather and was led to believe that his grandmother and mother were dead. He didn't reunite with his mother until a neighbor from the reservation in Oklahoma where he was living recognized his picture from a photo shown at the end of the 1983 movie Adam. McCane later grew up to become a famous Grammy Award-winning rap artist.
July 27, 1981	Adam Walsh	Ottis Toole	Hollywood, Florida, US	6	Murdered	Walsh was abducted from a Sears department store at the Hollywood Mall and was later found murdered. His father, John Walsh, later became the host of America's Most Wanted.
July 6, 1983	Tammy Lynn Leppert	Unknown	Rockledge, Florida, US	18	Unknown	Leppart was a former child actress and model who disappeared in unknown circumstances.
July 19, 1984	Edith Rosenkranz	Glenn I Wright and Dennis Moss	Washington, D.C., US		Released	Edith, wife of Dr. George Rosenkranz, a wealthy Mexico City businessman, was kidnapped at gunpoint from the Washington-Sheraton Hotel during an American Contract Bridge League national tournament. She was returned unharmed two days later after her husband paid a ransom of US$1,000,000. The ransom money was later recovered and the two kidnappers were later convicted and sentenced, as was a third defendant, Orland D. Tolden.
April 6, 1986	Anthonette Cayedito	Unknown	Gallup, New Mexico, US	9	Unknown	Cayedito was kidnapped from her home. She was profiled on Unsolved Mysteries a few years after her disappearance. It is believed that she phoned 911 a year after her kidnapping in a desperate attempt to be rescued. She may have also been seen by a waitress in Las Vegas a few years later. The girl has never been located.
August 4, 1987	Carlina White	Annugetta "Ann" Pettway	New York City, US	19 days	Escaped	White was taken from Harlem Hospital Center as an infant and raised by Pettway. She was reunited with her family in January 2011, 23 years later, in the longest known non-parental abduction.
September 20, 1988	Tara Calico	Unknown	Belen, New Mexico, US	19	Unknown	Calico disappeared near her home after taking her usual bike ride. Several witnesses claimed she was being followed by a 1953–54 Ford pickup and was never heard from again. No sign of Tara was found until on 15 June 1989 when a woman found a Polaroid photo of an unidentified young girl and boy, both bound and gagged, in the parking lot of a convenience store in Port St. Joe, Florida. The girl in the Polaroid is believed to be Tara, but this has not been confirmed. Two other Polaroid photographs, possibly of Tara, have surfaced over the years, but have yet to be released to the public. It is unclear whether Tara Calico is still alive.
November 19, 1988	Michaela Garecht	Unknown	Hayward, California, US	9	Unknown	Garecht was abducted by a Caucasian male thought to be about 18–24 years old. Michaela rode to a small neighborhood market on her scooter with her best friend to get treats. When Garecht tried to grab her scooter a man forced her into his car. Neither Michaela or the abductor have been seen or heard from since. In 2020, serial killer David Misch was linked to the abuction and as of 2025 is awaiting trial.
October 22, 1989	Jacob Wetterling	Danny Heinrich	St. Joseph, Minnesota, US	11	Murdered	Wetterling was kidnapped on his way home by a masked gunman. Danny Heinrich confessed to the kidnapping and murder of Wetterling in September 2016.
May 8, 1990	Becky O'Connell	Donald Eugene Moeller	Sioux Falls, South Dakota, US	9	Murdered	O'Connell was walking home from a neighborhood convenience store when she was kidnapped by Moeller. He took her to a wooded area along the banks of the Big Sioux River east of Lake Alvin in Lincoln County where he raped her, stabbed her multiple times, and then cut her throat. Moeller was executed for the crime by lethal injection in 2012.
June 10, 1991	Jaycee Lee Dugard	Phillip Garrido and Nancy Garrido	South Lake Tahoe, California, US	11	Rescued	Dugard was kidnapped from a bus stop and held captive for 18 years. She was found alive by suspicious parole officers on August 26, 2009. During captivity she gave birth to two children.
September 11, 1991	Carrie Lawson	Jerry Bland	Jasper, Alabama, US	25	Murdered	Lawson was a young lawyer kidnapped in an infamously bungled case in FBI history. A ransom demand of $300,000 was made, which was paid by the family. The FBI inserted tracking devices in the money bag and on the delivery person, but both were on the same frequency and the FBI tracked the delivery person, leaving the money drop by mistake. After later getting a break in the case, the FBI went to the home of suspect Jerry Bland, who refused entry, and while retrieving a search warrant left in the car, the suspect retreated inside and shot himself, taking any information on her whereabouts to his grave. Neither Lawson nor her remains were ever found. The ransom money was mostly recovered from the suspect's attic and vehicle.
December 28, 1992	Katie Beers	John Esposito	Long Island, New York, US	9	Released and rescued	Two days before her tenth birthday, Beers was lured into the home of John Esposito, a friend of her family. She was held captive inside a concrete bunker underneath Esposito's garage. Esposito falsely claimed that Beers was kidnapped by a third party in an amusement park, but 17 days after the abduction, he took police to where he was holding her.
August 18, 1993	Sara Ann Wood	Lewis Lent	Frankfort, New York, US	12	Murdered	Wood disappeared on a quiet road near her home. Lent, a janitor from Massachusetts, confessed to kidnapping, sexually assaulting, and killing Wood, but he refused to say where he buried her body. Lent had also pleaded guilty to the 1990 kidnapping and murder of 12-year-old Pittsfield, Massachusetts, native Jimmy Bernardo. Lent abducted Bernardo from the Pittsfield movie theater where Lent worked as a janitor. He was sentenced to life without parole for the Bernardo murder and sentenced to 25-years-to-life for the Wood murder. He is in prison in Massachusetts. Lent is suspected in a number of other child kidnapping cases. Lent recanted his confession and refuses to disclose the location of Wood's body. Lent has said that he can't say where her body is because she is not buried alone.
October 1, 1993	Polly Klaas	Richard Allen Davis	Petaluma, California	12	Murdered	Klaas was kidnapped from her home and later strangled. Davis's car got stuck in the mud a few miles from Polly's house. A local police officer pulled him out of the mud but did not query his license number with the police computer system, nor did he hear the BOLO (be on the lookout) broadcast to all CHP radios reporting that Davis was wanted for a parole violation. Davis has been convicted of kidnapping and first-degree murder and sentenced to death. BOLOs are now broadcast to all police radios: state, county, and municipal.
September 12, 1994	Michael Anthony Hughes	Unknown	Choctaw, Oklahoma, US	6	unknown	Hughes was abducted from his elementary school by his step-father, Franklin Delano Floyd. Two months later, Floyd was arrested in Kentucky, but the boy was not with him. He has given inconsistent statements regarding the boy's whereabouts, but Hughes was never located. It was later discovered that Hughes' mother, Sharon Marshall, was not only Floyd's wife, but was raised by Floyd from an early age and is assumed to be a childhood kidnapping victim herself. She died when Hughes was two years old. Floyd is the prime suspect in her murder as well.
August 14, 1994	Jameika Porch	Unknown	Chattanooga, Tennessee, US	4	Murdered	Porch was abducted from her bedroom at her grandmother's home. Her remains were discovered in 2000 and it was determined that she was strangled by ligature shortly after she vanished.
June 9, 1995	Morgan Nick	Unknown	Alma, Arkansas, US	6	Unknown	Nick was at a baseball game with her mother. She was last seen at her car after catching fireflies with her friends, and she was also seen talking to a man who police believe was her abductor. She has not been found; her mother started a foundation to help families with missing children.
September 16, 1995	Jessyca Mullenburg	Steven Oliver	Eau Claire, Wisconsin, US	13	Rescued	Oliver had first met Mullenberg when he was an aide at her school and became obsessed with her. He followed Mullenburg and her father as they moved to two locations in Wisconsin and eventually moved across the street from the Mullenbergs in Eau Claire. Oliver told Mullenburg that a publisher was interested in a story that she wrote; she agreed to go with Oliver in his car. Mullenberg dozed off in the car and, when she awoke, her feet and hands were bound. After an eight-hour drive to Kansas City, Mullenberg and Oliver boarded a plane to Houston, where she spent the majority of her three-and-a-half-month captivity in a motel room. Mullenberg says that physical, sexual and mental abuse were common. Within weeks, Oliver had convinced Mullenberg that her parents didn't want to get her back and didn't love her. Mullenberg says she became so completely disconnected from reality that she remembered very little from her past. A chance viewing of America's Most Wanted on television confirmed the manager's suspicions that Oliver was up to something. Immediately after recognizing Oliver's photo on the show, calls were placed to law enforcement and the FBI. Authorities who raced to the hotel knew who Mullenberg was but, after months in captivity, she did not. Only after authorities showed Mullenberg pictures from her past did she come back to reality.
January 13, 1996	Amber Hagerman	Unknown	Arlington, Texas, US	9	Murdered	Hagerman was kidnapped while riding her bike near her grandparents' home. She was found four days later by a hiker and his dog, naked in a creek bed. An autopsy revealed she had been alive two days, was raped and then her throat was slit. Although a $75,000 reward was offered for information leading to Hagerman's killer, he or she was never found. The task force investigating her murder was dissolved in June 1997. Her murder inspired the creation of the Amber alert system.
December 15, 1997	Delimar Vera Cuevas	Carolyn Correa	Frankford, Philadelphia, US	10 days	Rescued	Cuevas was a baby when she was thought to have been killed in a fire. Six years later, her mother discovered her at a birthday party. After DNA tests confirmed that the child was indeed her own, the kidnapper went on the run leaving behind three more children.
May 17, 1999	Andria Nichole Brewer	Karl Roberts	Arkansas, US	12	Murdered	Roberts, 35, was convicted in May 2000 by a Polk County Circuit Court jury of capital murder in the May 17, 1999, rape and strangling of Brewer, his niece.
October 12, 1999	Pamela Butler	Keith Dwayne Nelson	Kansas City, Kansas, US	10	Murdered	Butler was rollerblading in front of her house when she was kidnapped by Nelson. He took her across the state line from Kansas into Grain Valley, Missouri, to a church. There he took her into a wooded area, where he raped and strangled Butler with speaker wire. Nelson was arrested two days later near the Kansas River, and Butler's body was recovered the following day. Nelson was found guilty and sentenced to death by lethal injection in a federal facility. He was executed for the crime on August 28, 2020, at USP Terre Haute.
April 6, 2001	Anne Sluti	Anthony Steven "Tony Zappa" Wright	Kearney, Nebraska, US	17	Released and rescued	Sluti was kidnapped from a mall parking lot in April 2001, taken out of state and raped for six days before Wright surrendered to police.
January 1, 2002	Alicia Kozakiewicz	Scott Tyree	Pittsburgh, Pennsylvania, US	13	Rescued	One of the first reported cases of Internet abduction, Kozakiewicz was groomed and abducted by an Internet predator. She was held captive until she was rescued by the FBI when the abductor live-streamed the abuse. Kozakiewicz went on to become a motivational speaker, advocate, and the namesake of Alicia's Law.
February 1, 2002	Danielle van Dam	David Westerfield	Sabre Springs, San Diego, California, US	7	Murdered	Van Dam was abducted from her bed; her body was found by searchers three weeks later in a remote area. Westerfield, who had no prior criminal record, lived two houses away from the van Dams. He was convicted and sentenced to death for the crime. As of 2012 he is incarcerated at San Quentin State Prison.
June 5, 2002	Elizabeth Smart	Brian David Mitchell	Salt Lake City, Utah, US	14	Rescued	Smart was kidnapped from her bedroom and was found alive nine months later in a suburb of Salt Lake City on March 12, 2003.
July 15, 2002	Samantha Runnion	Alejandro Avila	Stanton, California, US	5	Murdered	Runnion was kidnapped from the front yard of her home. Her body was found one day later in Cleveland National Forest. Avila is currently incarcerated at San Quentin State Prison in California.
July 22, 2002	Erica Pratt	Edward Johnson and James Burns	Philadelphia, US	7	Escaped	Pratt was forced into a car from a street. She escaped by gnawing through duct tape used to keep her bound and by smashing a window.
August 22, 2002	Michelle Knight	Ariel Castro	Cleveland, Ohio, US	21	Rescued	Knight was last seen when she left her cousin's house. Knight, along with Amanda Berry, a child of Amanda Berry born in captivity, and Gina DeJesus were found alive and in reasonable health within 3 miles of the site of their disappearances on May 6, 2013.
October 6, 2002	Shawn Hornbeck	Michael J. Devlin	Richwoods, Missouri, US	11	Rescued	Hornbeck was kidnapped while riding his bicycle near his home. He was missing for over four years before being found alive at the age of 15 on January 12, 2007. 13-year-old Ben Ownby was found with him after having been missing for five days.
November 11, 2002	Samantha Nicole Burns	Unknown	Huntington, West Virginia, US	19	Unknown	Burns, a student of Marshall Community and Technical College Physical Therapy Program, was abducted at the Marshall University Court Yard Apartments. She was last heard from by her mother at 9:45 pm and her car was discovered burning around the Cabell–Wayne County lines at 3:30 am on November 12, 2002. She has not been seen or heard from since, is presumed dead and no remains have been recovered. South Carolina Death Row inmates Chadwick E. Fulks and Branden L. Basham claim responsibility for the disappearance of Burns. At that time they were escapees of another correctional facility. They have yet to provide enough credible details that lead to Burns's whereabouts.
April 21, 2003	Amanda Berry	Ariel Castro	Cleveland, Ohio, US	16	Escaped	Berry was abducted one day before her 17th birthday. During captivity, Berry gave birth to a daughter. Just over 10 years later, on May 6, 2013, Berry escaped along with Michelle Knight, Gina DeJesus and Berry's daughter. They were in reasonable health and within 3 miles of the site of their disappearances.
April 2, 2004	Gina DeJesus	Ariel Castro	Cleveland, Ohio, US	14	Rescued	Just over nine years after DeJesus' abduction, on May 6, 2013, she was rescued along with Amanda Berry, Michelle Knight, and a child of Amanda Berry's born in captivity. They were in reasonable health and within 3 miles of the site of their disappearances.
February 24, 2005	Jessica Lunsford	John Couey	Homosassa, Florida, US	9	Murdered	Lunsford was abducted from her home in the early morning. Believed held captive over the weekend, she was raped and later murdered by 46-year-old Couey, who lived nearby. The media covered the investigation and trial of her killer extensively. On August 24, 2007, a judge in Inverness, Florida, sentenced Couey, a convicted sex offender, to death for kidnapping, sexual battery, and first-degree murder of Lunsford.
September 5, 2005	Taylor Behl	Benjamin Fawley	Richmond, Virginia, US	17	Murdered	*Behl, a Virginia Commonwealth University freshman, was found dead on October 5, 2005, in Mathews County, Virginia, after having gone missing a month earlier.
February 9, 2009	Haleigh Cummings	Unknown	Satsuma, Florida, US	5	Unknown	Cummings was last seen sleeping in her family's trailer. She was discovered missing and the rear door to the trailer was several inches ajar and the screen door had been propped open with a cinderblock. The case remains unsolved.
March 27, 2009	Sandra Cantu	Melissa Huckaby	Tracy, California, US	8	Murdered	Several days after Cantu went missing on April 6, a suitcase was discovered in a pond containing her body. On April 10, 2009, police arrested 28-year-old Melissa Huckaby and charged her with the kidnapping, rape, and murder of Cantu.
May 24, 2009	Nevaeh Buchanan	Unknown	Monroe, Michigan, US	5	Murdered	Buchanan was discovered missing from the parking lot of the Charlotte Arms apartment complex. A fishermen discovered Nevaeh's body along the banks of the River Raisin in Raisinville Township on June 4, 2009.
June 4, 2010	Kyron Horman	Unknown	Portland, Oregon, US	7	Unknown	Horman disappeared when he did not return home from Skyline Elementary School. Local and state police along with the FBI conducted an exhaustive search for the boy and launched a criminal investigation, but have not uncovered any significant information regarding the boy's whereabouts.
July 11, 2011	Leiby Kletzky	Levi Aro	New York City, US	8	Murdered	Kletzky was kidnapped on his way home from day camp in his Hasidic Jewish neighborhood.
October 3, 2011	Lisa Irwin	Unknown	Kansas City, Missouri, US	10 months	Unknown	Irwin disappeared from her home in the early hours of the morning.
April 21, 2012	Isabel Celis	Christopher Clements	Tucson, Arizona	6	Murdered	Celis was reported missing by her father around 8 a.m. when she was not in her room, and a bedroom window was opened with the screen removed. Her remains were found in a rural area of Pima County, Arizona, on March 31, 2017.
January 29, 2013	Ethan Gilman	Jimmy Lee Dykes	Midland City, Alabama, US	5	Rescued	Dykes, a 65-year-old Vietnam War-era veteran, boarded a Dale County school bus, killed the driver, and took Gilman hostage. On the afternoon of February 4, law enforcement agents entered the bunker, killed Dykes, and rescued Gilman.
March 13, 2017	Elizabeth Thomas	Tad Cummins	Culleoka, Tennessee, US	15	Rescued	Elizabeth Thomas was taken from her hometown near Culleoka, Tennessee by her married, 50-year-old health sciences teacher at Culleoka Unit School. After 38 days and over 2,500 miles traveled, Thomas was finally rescued from a cabin she stayed in with her abductor outside of Cecilville, California.
