= Child abduction =

Unauthorized removal of a minor

Child abduction or child theft is the unauthorized removal of a minor (a child under the age of legal adulthood) from the custody of the child's natural parents or legally appointed guardians.

The term child abduction includes two legal and social categories which differ by their perpetrating contexts: abduction by members of the child's family or abduction by strangers:

- Parental child abduction is the unauthorized custody of a child by a family relative (usually one or both parents) without parental agreement and contrary to family law ruling, which may have removed the child from the care, access and contact of the other parent and family side. Occurring around parental separation or divorce, such parental or familial child abduction may include parental alienation, a form of child abuse seeking to disconnect a child from targeted parent and denigrated side of family. This is, by far, the most common form of child abduction.
- Abduction or kidnapping by strangers (by people unknown to the child and outside the child's family) is rare. Some of the reasons why a stranger might kidnap an unknown child include:
  - extortion to elicit a ransom from the parents for the child's return
  - illegal adoption, a stranger steals a child with the intent to rear the child as their own or to sell to a prospective adoptive parent
  - human trafficking, stealing a child with the intent to exploit the child themselves or through trade to someone who will abuse the child through slavery, forced labor, or sexual abuse.
  - Pedicide, also known by its other name as child murder.

== Parental child abduction ==
By far the most common kind of child abduction is parental child abduction (200,000 in 2010 alone). It often occurs when the parents separate or begin divorce proceedings. A parent may remove or retain the child from the other seeking to gain an advantage in expected or pending child-custody proceedings or because that parent fears losing the child in those expected or pending child-custody proceedings; a parent may refuse to return a child at the end of an access visit or may flee with the child to prevent an access visit or fear of domestic violence and abuse.

Parental child abductions may result in the child be kept within the same city, within the state or region, within the same country, or sometimes may result in the child being taken to a different country.

Most parental abductions are resolved fairly quickly. Studies performed for the U.S. Department of Justice's Office of Juvenile Justice and Delinquency Prevention reported that in 1999, 53% of family abducted children were gone less than one week, and 21% were gone one month or more.

Parental abduction has been characterized as child abuse, when seen from the perspective of the kidnapped child.

=== International child abduction ===
Hague Abduction Convention
Convention on the Civil Aspects of International Child Abduction
- State parties to the convention: States that signed and ratified the convention States that acceded to the convention State that ratified, but convention has not entered into force
- Signed: 25 October 1980
- Location: The Netherlands
- Effective: 1 December 1983
- Parties: 101 (October 2020)
- Depositary: Ministry of Foreign Affairs of the Kingdom of the Netherlands
- Languages: French and English

Full text
- Convention on the Civil Aspects of International Child Abduction at Wikisource

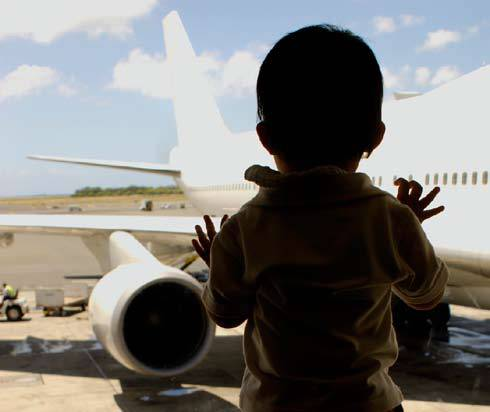
Image from the United States Hague Abduction Convention Compliance Reports on the Hague Convention on the Civil Aspects of International Child Abduction

International child abduction occurs when a parent, relative or acquaintance of a child leaves the country with the child or children in violation of a custody decree or visitation order. Another related situation is retention where children are taken on an alleged vacation to a foreign country and are not returned.

While the number of cases which is over 600,000 a year consists of international child abduction is small in comparison to domestic cases, they are often the most difficult to resolve due to the involvement of conflicting international jurisdictions. Two-thirds of international parental abduction cases involve mothers who often allege domestic violence. Even when there is a treaty agreement for the return of a child, the court may be reluctant to return the child if the return could result in the permanent separation of the child from their primary caregiver. This could occur if the abducting parent faced criminal prosecution or deportation by returning to the child's home country.

The Hague Convention on the Civil Aspects of International Child Abduction is an international human rights treaty and legal mechanism to recover children abducted to another country. The Hague Convention does not provide relief in many cases, resulting in some parents hiring private parties to recover their children. Covert recovery was first made public when Don Feeney, a former Delta Commando, responded to a desperate mother's plea to locate and recover her daughter from Jordan in the 1980s. Feeney successfully located and returned the child. A movie and book about Feeney's exploits lead to other desperate parents seeking him out for recovery services.

By 2007, both the United States, European authorities, and NGO's had begun serious interest in the use of mediation as a means by which some international child abduction cases may be resolved. The primary focus was on Hague Cases. Development of mediation in Hague cases, suitable for such an approach, had been tested and reported by REUNITE, a London Based NGO which provides support in international child abduction cases, as successful. Their reported success lead to the first international training for cross-border mediation in 2008, sponsored by NCMEC. Held at the University of Miami School of Law, Lawyers, Judges, and certified mediators interested in international child abduction cases, attended.

International child abduction is not new. A case of international child abduction has been documented aboard the Titanic. However, the incidence of international child abduction continues to increase due to the ease of international travel, increase in bi-cultural marriages and a high divorce rate.

Unfortunately, when children are taken from or to a country that is not a Contracting State of the Hague Convention Treaty, or when neither of them is, there is not much that can be done to bring the child back to their country of habitual residence. Another factor that has not been evaluated enough is the increasing number of cases when a child is taken by the mother and the father was the primary caregiver to a country where the law still maintains old views regarding the roles of women and men within the family, in such cases the child custody is awarded to the mother without any consideration.

== Abductions by strangers ==
The stereotypical version of kidnapping by a stranger is the classic form of "kidnapping", exemplified by the Lindbergh kidnapping, in which the child is detained, transported some distance, held for ransom or with intent to keep the child permanently. These instances are rare.

=== Child abduction for ransom: United States ===
The earliest nationally publicised kidnapping of a child by a stranger for the purpose of extracting a ransom payment from the parents was the Pool case of 1819, which took place in Baltimore, Maryland. Margaret Pool, 20-months-old, was kidnapped on May 20 by Nancy Gamble (19-years-old) and secreted with the assistance of Marie Thomas. On May 22, the parents, James and Mary Pool, placed an ad in the Baltimore Patriot newspaper offering a $20 reward for Mary's return. ($491.86 in 2024). When the child was recovered on May 23—through the efforts of members of the community who conducted a search—it was revealed that the child had been badly whipped by Gamble and bore bloody wounds. Both Gamble and Thomas were tried for the crime of kidnapping and found guilty. The motive for the crime was demonstrated to be financial. She had kidnapped the child with the intention of waiting for a reward to be offered, then would return the child and collect the money. This is a technique favored by many ransom child kidnappers before the use of written ransom demands became the favored method. Nancy Gamble's crime and subsequent trial were reported in detail in Baltimore Patriot (June 26, 1819). The June 26 article, as well as others on the case that had appeared in the Patriot, were reprinted in newspapers in other states including: Connecticut, Maryland, Massachusetts, New Hampshire, New Jersey, New York, Pennsylvania, Vermont, Virginia and Washington D.C.

=== Child abduction by CPS ===
Former Georgia Senator Nancy Schaefer was a vocal critic of the corruption that the Adoption and Safe Families Act incentivized in all US child protection organizations. She argued that the thousands of dollars in adoption bonuses for every child they adopt out rewards such organizations with seizing children from and thwarting reunification efforts with the children's parents.

=== Children abducted for slavery ===
In 1597, Elizabeth I of England licensed the abduction of children for use as chapel choristers and theatre performers.

The Lord's Resistance Army, a rebel paramilitary group operating mainly in northern Uganda, is notorious for its abductions of children for use as child soldiers or sex slaves. According to the Sudan Tribune, as of 2005, more than 30,000 children have been kidnapped by the LRA and their leader, Joseph Kony.

=== By stranger to raise ===
A very small number of abductions result from women who kidnap babies (or other young children) to bring up as their own. These women are often unable to have children of their own, or have miscarried, and choose to abduct a child rather than adopting. The crime is often premeditated, with the woman often simulating pregnancy to reduce suspicion when a baby suddenly appears in the household.

Historically, a few states have practiced child abduction for indoctrination, as a form of punishment for political opponents, or for profit. Notable cases include the kidnapping of children by Nazi Germany for Germanization, the lost children of Francoism, during which an estimated 300,000 children were abducted from their parents, and the about 500 "Children of the Disappeared (Desaparecidos)" who were adopted by the military in the Argentine Dirty War. In Australia the 'Stolen Generation' is the term given to native Aboriginal children who were forcibly abducted or whose mothers gave consent under duress or misleading information so the government could assimilate the black population into the white majority. In Canada, with the Sixties Scoop, indigenous children were systematically removed from their families and culture to be fostered and adopted by white families.

Some other abductions have been to make children available by child-selling for adoption by other people, without adopting parents necessarily being aware of how children were actually made available for adoption.

== Abduction before birth ==
Neonatal infant abduction and prenatal fetal abduction are the earliest ages of child abduction, when child is expansively defined as a viable baby before birth (usually a few months before the typical time for birth) through the age of majority (the age at which a young person is legally recognized as an adult). In addition, embryo theft and even oocyte misappropriation in reproductive medical settings have been legalistically construed as child abduction.

== Global Missing Children's Network ==
Launched in 1998 as a joint venture of the International Centre for Missing & Exploited Children (ICMEC) and NCMEC, the Global Missing Children's Network (GMCN) is a network of countries that connect, share best practices, and disseminate information and images of missing children to improve the effectiveness of missing children investigations. The Network has 22 member countries: Albania, Argentina, Australia, Belarus, Belgium, Brazil, Canada, Germany, Greece, Ireland, Italy, Mexico, the Netherlands, New Zealand, Poland, Romania, Russia, Serbia, South Africa, South Korea, Spain, the United Kingdom, and the US.

Each country can access a customizable website platform, and can enter missing children information into a centralized, multilingual database that has photos of and information about missing children, which can be viewed and distributed to assist in location and recovery efforts. GMCN staff train new countries joining the Network, and provide an annual member conference sponsored by Motorola Solutions Foundation at which best practices, current issues, trends, policies, procedures, and possible solutions are discussed.

The parents of Madeleine McCann, a three-year-old girl who disappeared from her bed in a hotel in Portugal in 2007, approached ICMEC to help them publicize her case. ICMEC's YouTube channel, "Don'tYouForgetAboutMe", which lets people post videos, images, and information about their missing children, was launched that year as a part of these efforts, and as of November 2014 had 2,200 members. ICMEC reviews the postings to ensure that any child in a posted video is in fact missing, that authorities are aware that the child is missing, and that the images are not inappropriate.

== Laws ==
=== International ===
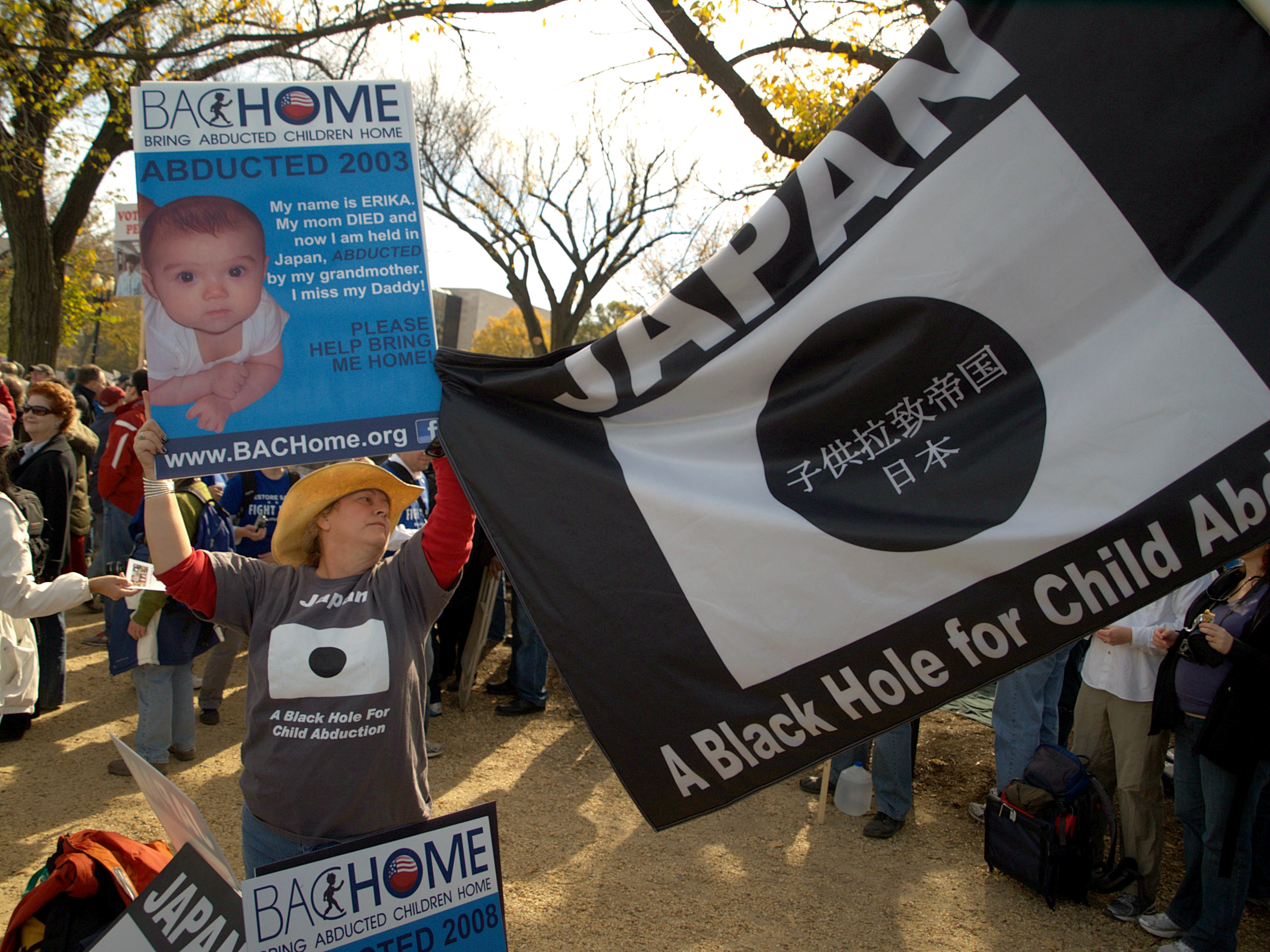
Photographs of the Rally to Restore Sanity and/or Fear

- Hague Convention on the Civil Aspects of International Child Abduction

=== France ===
Since February 2006, France has adopted a nationwide alert system, Alerte Enlèvement, which broadcasts (via radio, television, street signs and airport and train stations screens) crucial information when an abduction of a minor takes place. The French Penal Code describes the fact of "without order of a constituted authority and except as ordered by law, to stop, to remove, to detain or to kidnap a person" punishable by twenty years of imprisonment. If the victim is mutilated or permanently disabled as a result of the kidnapping, the offense is punishable by thirty years of imprisonment and by life imprisonment when it is preceded or accompanied by torture or "barbaric acts".

=== United Kingdom ===
See the Child Abduction Act 1984, the Child Abduction and Custody Act 1985 and the Child Abduction (Northern Ireland) Order 1985. In Scotland there exists the common law offence of plagium, 'child-stealing', referring to a prepubescent child, an offence against property rather than against the person, despite that children are no longer considered property.

=== United States ===
The United States has a variety of related laws at the state and municipal levels. With the passage of the Amber Hagerman Child Protection Law of 1996, the US developed the Amber alert system, which broadcasts cases of suspected kidnapping when the child is believed to be in a motor vehicle and the vehicle licence plate is known, and the National Sex Offender Registry. Some laws, such as the Adam Walsh Child Protection and Safety Act, aim to prevent stranger abductions through public sex offender registries which include an offender's address.

== See also ==
- Child abduction alert system
- Child Abduction Response Team
- Child laundering
- Child Protective Services
- Code Adam
- Commercial sexual exploitation of children
- Joint custody
- Khapper
- Phantom social workers
- Prostitution of children
- Supervised visitation
- Take Root
- Trafficking of children
- Jacob Wetterling
