= List of killings by law enforcement officers in the United States, February 2013 =

This is a list of people reported killed by non-military law enforcement officers in the United States in February 2013, whether in the line of duty or not, and regardless of reason or method. The listing documents the occurrence of a death, making no implications regarding wrongdoing or justification on the part of the person killed or officer involved. Killings are arranged by date of the incident that caused death. Different death dates, if known, are noted in the description. The table below lists 57 people.

== February 2013 ==
| Date | Name (Age) of Deceased | Race | State (City) | Description |
|---|---|---|---|---|
| 2013-02-28 | Shreckengaust, Richard (37) | White | California (Guerneville) | Police received a call from a woman whose friend was sending her text messages saying she had been kidnapped. Police located the vehicle and attempted to pull it over. Shreckengaust, the driver, refused to stop, and eventually crashed into an embankment. A deputy shot Shreckengaust several times, killing him, when he allegedly leaned to the right of the car. Police did not find a gun. The woman, an acquaintance of Shreckengaust, was not harmed. |
| 2013-02-28 | Richard Edward McKenzie (46) | Black | Texas (Houston) | |
| 2013-02-26 | Jurgen, Adam (24) | White | South Carolina (Columbia) | Police were responding to report of a man assaulting a woman. The man, Jurgen, fled the scene and then fired at officers, striking deputy Sheila Aull. Aull and at least four other officers returned fire and killed Jurgen. |
| 2013-02-26 | Keewatinawin, Jack (21) | Native American | Washington (Seattle) | Police were responding to a call that a man was armed with a knife and holding his father hostage. When officers arrived, Keewatinawin used his father as a shield and attempted to flee, police say. Three officers shot and killed Keewatinawin when he allegedly threatened an officer with a steel pipe. |
| 2013-02-26 | Goulet, Jeremy (35) | White | California (Santa Cruz) | Goulet was shot and killed during a police pursuit after allegedly fatally shooting Santa Cruz officers Sgt. Loran Baker and Detective Elizabeth Butler. Baker and Butler had come to Goulet's home to follow up on sexual assault allegations. The officers killed were the first in the Santa Cruz Police Department's history to die in the line of duty. |
| 2013-02-25 | Lorenzo J. Ciaramella (39) | Hispanic | California (Riverside) | The man was shot to death by officers in the parking lot of an apartment complex. Police were responding to a report of a car theft in progress. Police say they shot him when he rammed a police cruiser with the stolen vehicle. |
| 2013-02-25 | Brett Max Knight (33) | White | Utah (Kaysville) | |
| 2013-02-25 | Jimmie Eugene Hickey (78) | White | Oregon (Silverton) | |
| 2013-02-24 | Michael Dugas (52) | White | Connecticut (Norwich) | |
| 2013-02-24 | Moises De La Torre (25) | Hispanic | California (Los Angeles) | |
| 2013-02-24 | Parker, Christopher J. (33) | | Washington (Spokane)| | Mr. Parker called 911 to report he was diabetic and had ingested methamphetamine. Responding police arrested him on an outstanding warrant, and while in the county jail deputies used a taser on him when he allegedly became uncooperative. |
| 2013-02-23 | Gary Allen Hawkins (33) | White | California (Stockton) | |
| 2013-02-23 | David Krambs (34) | White | Nevada (Sparks) | |
| 2013-02-23 | Kevin Michael McGlyn (51) | Unknown race | New Jersey (South River) | |
| 2013-02-22 | Potts, Martin Y. | White | Missouri (Springfield) | Police were investigating two burglaries and attempting to execute a search warrant on a property when they encountered Potts, who fled. Potts was killed by members of a Special Response Team after allegedly firing at officers. |
| 2013-02-22 | Jose Elias Mata (25) | Hispanic | Texas (San Antonio) | |
| 2013-02-21 | Taylor, Christopher (19) | Black | California (Long Beach) | Officers spotted a stolen vehicle and pursued it until it crashed into a garage. Taylor was shot and killed by officers after he allegedly fired at them. Police say they recovered a handgun at the scene. |
| 2013-02-21 | Thompson, Clifton (72) | White | Pennsylvania (Conewago) | Thompson called a crisis line to say he was armed and suicidal, and police were contact and sent to his home. Officers were allegedly trying to negotiate with Thompson when he fired one shot at them with a rifle and ran outside. He encountered another officer who fired at him four times with a patrol rifle, killing him. |
| 2013-02-21 | Saturnino Perez De La Rosa (44) | Hispanic | Pennsylvania (Allentown) | |
| 2013-02-20 | Stephen O'Neal Wattley II (21) | Black | Indiana (Fort Wayne) | |
| 2013-02-19 | Bowie, Carl Richard, III (25) | White | Alaska (Anchorage) | Police received a call about a man looking into cars in a parking lot. When they arrived he fled in a stolen truck, and a chase ensued. Two officers opened fire on Bowie after he allegedly hit two police cars with the truck. |
| 2013-02-19 | Javier Reyes (32) | Hispanic | Nevada (Las Vegas) | |
| 2013-02-19 | Marie Zienkewicz (89) | White | Pennsylvania (Warminster) | |
| 2013-02-19 | John Parker (23) | Black | Florida (Jacksonville) | In a car being chased by police, the police fired, killing him. a |
| 2013-02-18 | Sellars, Taft (30) | Black | Virginia (Alexandria) | Police arrived at a home and shot and killed Sellars, who they say had a gun. The Alexandria Police Department refuses to release any other information about this incident, citing department policy. |
| 2013-02-18 | Kevin William Hassell (31) | White | Michigan (Brighton) | |
| 2013-02-18 | Paul Tereschenko (35) | White | California (Sacramento) | |
| 2013-02-17 | Merle Mikal Hatch (50) | White | Oregon (Portland) | |
| 2013-02-16 | Juan Antonio Gonzalez (29) | Hispanic | Oklahoma (Tulsa) | |
| 2013-02-16 | Alberto Morales (42) | Hispanic | Texas (Grapevine) | |
| 2013-02-16 | Charles A. Baker Jr. (30) | Black | New York (Jamestown) | Baker was tased and later died of drug overdose. DA’s Office ruled accidental. |
| 2013-02-15 | Franco, Emmanuel (25) | Hispanic | California (Monterey Park) | Police were responding to a domestic disturbance between a couple at a motel. The couple left in a vehicle, and police followed them and initiated a traffic stop. Officers shot and killed Franco after he allegedly exited the vehicle and brandished a handgun at them. |
| 2013-02-14 | Alejandro Rendon (23) | Hispanic | California (Indio) | |
| 2013-02-13 | Kenny Detrelle Montgomery (34) | Black | Texas (Houston) | |
| 2013-02-13 | Rader, Ryan (39) | Unknown | Florida (Melbourne) | |
| 2013-02-12 | Kayla Moore | Black | California (Berkeley) | Moore, a Black transgender woman suffering from schizophrenia, was killed in police custody. After being handcuffed... Moore "continued to scream and kick," so the other officers used the ankle strap of a WRAP device to secure her ankles. " About a minute later, Brown said that Moore was no longer breathing and no longer had a pulse. |
| 2013-02-12 | Alden Patrick Anderson (32) | Black | Minnesota (St. Paul) | |
| 2013-02-12 | Gabriel Vernon Stevenson (18) | Black | Michigan (South Lyon) | |
| 2013-02-11 | Jason James Shaw (32) | White | Montana (Billings) | |
| 2013-02-11 | John Christopher Armes (29) | White | California (Temecula) | |
| 2013-02-11 | Charles Porter II (35) | White | South Carolina (Williamston) | |
| 2013-02-10 | Daniel K. Holt (34) | White | Ohio (Dayton) | |
| 2013-02-10 | Ashley Browder (21) | White | New Mexico (Albuquerque) | |
| 2013-02-09 | Sixto Eduardo Quezada (22) | Hispanic | Texas (Fort Worth) | |
| 2013-02-09 | Otis Roberson (32) | Black | Missouri (St. Louis) | |
| 2013-02-09 | Stoney Eugene Rawlinson (40) | White | Texas (Dallas) | |
| 2013-02-09 | Ralph Elliott III (41) | White | Michigan (Dowling) | |
| 2013-02-08 | Tonya Michelle Buggs (43) | Unknown race | Maryland (Bladensburg) | |
| 2013-02-08 | Armando Santibanez (22) | Hispanic | California (Visalia) | |
| 2013-02-08 | Torres, Roberto Antonio (33) | Hispanic | Nevada (Las Vegas) | Torres was killed during an exchange of gunfire with Las Vegas Metropolitan Police Department officer Joseph Parra and Detective Scott Thomas in an apartment parking lot. Two bystanders were hit by gunfire; one was hospitalized and in critical condition. |
| 2013-02-07 | Jonathan Tims (27) | White | Arkansas (Pocahontas) | |
| 2013-02-07 | Jason N. Noroian (32) | White | Missouri (St. Louis) | |
| 2013-02-05 | Dorfman, Jacob (52) | White | Washington (Spokane) | An eyewitness claimed he saw a shirtless man pacing in the street and screaming for help before firing one shot from a handgun. After a short car chase, officers shot and killed Mr. Dorfman. |
| 2013-02-04 | Dykes, Jimmy Lee (65) | White | Alabama (Midland City) | Six days earlier, subject killed a school bus driver and abducted a 5-year-old boy, then took refuge in an underground bunker on his property. After negotiations broke down, FBI SWAT team raided the bunker killing the subject. |
| 2013-02-03 | Price Robinson Perrin (87) | Unknown | Texas (Harlingen) | Officers responded to a report of a domestic disturbance. They arrived to witness a man shoot a woman in the chest. The officers fatally shot the man. |
| 2013-02-03 | Gagliardi, Kristofer Charles (24) | White | Texas (Copperas Cove) | Copperas Cove officer Billy J. Ray III shot and killed Gagliardi while responding to a domestic violence call. Police say Gagliardi had a knife. |
| 2013-02-01 | Chaz Devell Williams (21) | Black | Georgia (Augusta) | |

== See also ==
- Death in custody § United States
- Henry A. Wallace Police Crime Public Database
- List of cases of police brutality
- List of countries with annual rates and counts for killings by law enforcement officers
- List of law enforcement officers killed in the line of duty in the United States
- List of law enforcement officers convicted for an on-duty killing in the United States
- List of police reforms related to the George Floyd protests
- List of unarmed African Americans killed by law enforcement officers in the United States
- Lists of killings by law enforcement officers
- Police brutality in the United States
- Police misconduct § United States
- Police riot § United States
- Police use of deadly force in the United States
