= Child Alert Foundation =

US non-profit organization

The Child Alert Foundation (CAF) is a private, 501(c)(3) non-profit organization that was established in the state of Pennsylvania in 1998. Operating strictly from donations and fund raising, CAF is dedicated to assisting federal and local law enforcement agencies in the recovery of missing and abducted children and elderly individuals. The Child Alert Foundation helps law enforcement notify their surrounding communities with their copyrighted Abduction Central Alert (ACA) community alert notification system.

The Child Alert Foundation was the first organization to ever create a fully automated implementation of the Amber Plan outlined in 1997 in Dallas, Texas, which has since become the Amber alert. The original Amber Plan (1997) was a faxed based procedure where law enforcement agencies were required to prepare information for public distribution and then fax that information to a list of designated primary radio stations. This was a manual procedure and time-consuming process.

The ACA system created by Child Alert is a totally automated procedure that was designed from the very beginning to exceed the original Amber Plan requirements. Rather than limit the alert to radio, CAF expanded coverage to include television and news organizations as well as other law enforcement agencies for notification. In addition to sending faxes as the original plan required, the ACA system sends emails, alert pagers, send text messaging, build automatic web pages, posters, and more. The ACA system also provides full circle notifications by issuing closure alerts when an incident is terminated.

Since its original implementation in 1998, the ACA system has been further expanded to assist law enforcement with notifying the community when a Silver Alert is issued for missing elderly individuals.

== History ==
The Child Alert Foundation (CAF) was founded in 1998 by Col. Vincent A. Albers Jr.(USMC Retired), Nancy T. Albers, Vincent A. Albers III and Marlene R. Slater to help law enforcement agencies across the nation immediately notify their surrounding communities of missing and abducted children.

With their collective backgrounds in computer technology, applications development and telecommunications, they collaborated and created a new Alert Notification System (ANS) that was called Abduction Central Alert (ACA) in honor of all missing children across the nation.

With the ACA system, an alert area of one hundred (100) miles is centered around the initial abduction location and establishes a "zone of influence" for the notification area. Since the first hour of any abduction is critical and an abduction vehicle can travel over 60 miles an hour, one minute can equal a mile and this was the reason why the 100 mile radius distance was selected. The alert "zone of influence" represents a virtual net that can cross state and local boundaries and provides law enforcement with a greater advantage of apprehending a perpetrator in that first hour.

This system can immediately notify a variety of agencies and organizations of missing and/or abducted individuals in a matter of seconds of being activated.

In May 2001, the Child Alert Foundation released their infrared digital fingerprinting services program called the ACA Child Identification Poster System (ACA CHIPS). This program automated the old Polaroid photograph and ink fingerprint concept of providing child identification services and stored information digitally on disk that could easily be retrieved and imported into the automated Abduction Central Alert (ACA) community alert notification system.

The CHIPS program interfaces with a digital video camera to take real time video snapshots and an infrared fingerprint scanner to capture digital impressions of a child's fingerprints. This information is saved in various digital formats on a disk or flash drive and given only to parents and guardians to access in case of an emergency. In the unfortunate event that a child is reported missing and/or abducted, the digital information can immediately be reloaded into an alert notification system (ANS) program like Abduction Central Alert so that an Amber Alert can be immediately activated by law enforcement.

Law enforcement could use ACA CHIPS to provide parents and guardians with child identification disks as a community service. Parents in turn could provide the CHIPS disks back to law enforcement in the case of an emergency so that an expedited Amber Alert could be activated using the ACA system to notify their surrounding community of a missing child.

== See also ==
- Amber alert
- Masonic Child Identification Programs
- Silver Alert
