= Mary McElroy =

Mary McElroy may refer to:

- Mary Arthur McElroy (1841–1917), sister of the 21st President of the United States, Chester A. Arthur
- Mary McElroy (kidnapping victim) (c. 1907–1940), American kidnapping victim
- Mary S. McElroy (born 1965), U.S. federal judge from Rhode Island
