= Child Abduction Response Team =

American multi-agency professionals trained to respond to child abuctions

A Child Abduction Response Team (CART) is a multi-agency group of professionals in the United States of America who are trained and equipped to respond rapidly in the search and recovery of endangered, missing, and abducted children. Each team can be formed, reformed, and disbanded as needed for any given case, depending on how long the child is missing. More than one CART can coordinate with other CARTs across multiple jurisdictions, including local, tribal, state, and national boundaries.

== Background ==
The National CART initiative was established in 2006 by the U.S. Department of Justice (USDOJ), Office of Justice Programs (OJP), Office of Juvenile Justice and Delinquency Prevention (OJJDP), and is administered through the AMBER Alert Training and Technical Assistance Program (AATTAP).

== Certification ==
CARTs employ standards for training and certification which are provided by the USDOJ to promote the use of the same local, state and federal rules, protocols, investigative procedures, and best practices to help quickly locate a child. The certification process objectively defines each role in the team to function efficiently and proficiently. Inter-agency cooperation and communication help bring constituent resources to bear in any given case.

== Composition ==
CARTs may consist of individuals from any number of groups, including but not limited to the following:

- Behavioral analysis units
- Canvassers
- Child welfare and protection investigators
- Corrections personnel
- Court system personnel
- Crime Stoppers
- Department of transportation
- Digital forensics analysts
- Crime scene investigators
- Emergency management
- Emergency medical technicians
- FBI agents
- Forensic evidence collectors and analysts
- Forensic interviewers
- Intelligence analysts
- Information analysts
- Interviewers
- Law enforcement officers
- National Center for Missing & Exploited Children
- K-9 units
- Public safety workers
- Prosecutors
- Search and rescue personnel
- Search and seizure personnel
- School resource officers
- Social workers

== See also ==
- AMBER Alert
- Child abduction
- Child abduction alert system
- Child Focus
- Code Adam
- Federal Bureau of Investigation
- International child abduction
- Kidnapping
- United States Children's Bureau
- Vanished Children's Alliance
