= Kidnapping in Canada =

Kidnapping is a crime in Canada. Throughout its history, a number of incidents have taken place.

== Prevalence ==
According to Canadian law enforcement agencies, about 50,492 missing children were reported to be missing in 2009. From 2000-2001, of about 90 incidents reported, there were only two that were actually stranger abduction, and in all other cases, the reports were in error.

However, parental child abduction seems to be bigger issue. 83 out of 100 kidnapped children are found to be victim of parental abduction. In 2009, there were 237 reported parental abductions.

== Law ==
Canadian law regards following instances to be a crime.

Every person commits an offence who abducts a person with intention.
To cause the person to be confined or imprisoned against the person’s consent;
To cause the person to be illegally sent or transported out of Canada against the person’s consent; or
To hold the person for release or to service against the person’s consent.

== Notable incidents ==
Date	Victim(s)	Abductor(s)	Location	Age of victim(s)	Outcome	Notes
October 5, 1970	James Cross and Pierre Laporte	Front de libération du Québec militants	Quebec, Canada	49	Released (Cross); Murdered (Laporte)	Cross was a British diplomat and Laporte was Quebec provincial politician. Their kidnappings set off the 1970 October Crisis. Cross was released in exchange for passage of his abductors to Cuba.
August 17, 1994	Mindy Tran	Unknown	Kelowna, British Columbia, Canada	8	Murdered	Tran disappeared from her neighbourhood just after supper. She rode her bike down her quiet street and vanished. Hundreds of people searched for the girl but her body wasn't found until six weeks later when a man with a divining rod led police to a shallow grave near her parents' home. She had been sexually assaulted and strangled.
July 31, 2007	Cédrika Provencher	Unknown	Trois-Rivières, Canada	10	Murdered	Her remains were discovered in December 2015.
