= Take Root =

American missing-child non-profit organization

Take Root, a non-profit organization established on a grant from the United States Department of Justice, was the first missing-child organization to be founded by former abducted children. Founded in 2003 as a program under the auspices of the Association of Missing & Exploited Children's Organizations and independently incorporated as a 501(c)(3) in 2005, Take Root had over five hundred former abducted children participate in its ground-breaking peer support program for former abducted children, creating an unprecedented knowledge and database used by its Child Abduction Studies branch to develop multidisciplinary training, case consultation, and policy recommendations. The agency's mission is to "insert the voice of the primary victim into public and policy discussions on child abduction, using the collected wisdom of former victims to improve America's missing-child response." Their tags-line are "beyond recovering missing-children; to helping missing-children recover" and, "where missing children are seen and heard." Take Root was the brain child of Melissa "Liss" Haviv, a Fulbright Scholar in cultural anthropology touted by NPR as a leading expert in the victimology of long term child abduction

== See also ==
- Child abduction
- Victimology
- International child abduction
