= Henry F. McElroy =

American government official (1865–1939)

1st City Manager of Kansas City, Missouri
- In office April 1926 – April 14, 1939

Personal details
- Born: August 17, 1865 Amboy, Illinois, U.S.
- Died: September 15, 1939 (aged 74) Kansas City, Missouri, U.S.
- Party: Democratic
- Spouse: Marie S. Orbison
- Children: Mary McElroy, Henry F. McElroy Jr.

Henry F. McElroy (August 17, 1865 – September 15, 1939) was an American government official. He was the first city manager of Kansas City, Missouri, a position he held during the era of political boss Tom Pendergast.

== Life and work ==
Henry Francis McElroy was born on August 17, 1865, in Amboy, Illinois. He moved to Kansas City, Missouri in 1896 to practice real estate. He was elected as one of two county judges of Jackson County, Missouri, in 1922. The other county judge was Harry S. Truman. The role of county judge was more like a county commissioner, but McElroy went by "Judge McElroy" even when he was city manager. The role of city manager was created when a new city charter was passed on November 3, 1925, and implemented the following April. The city manager is hired by the mayor and city council, ideally as a non-partisan city administrator. While this new form of local government worked well in other cities and still exists in Kansas City, this city council was controlled by political boss Tom Pendergast. McElroy became known as the heavy-handed implementer of the policies of Pendergast's machine.

McElroy's business background and the "Country Bookkeeping" he developed as a store manager in Iowa impressed the Kansas City business community. They felt he was just what a city manager should be. With this accounting method, he managed to cut in half the five million dollar deficit inherited from the previous administration, and announced a slight tax increase to cover the rest. However, he was not shy about exerting his power. One of his first acts was to take over the mayor's large office and relegating Mayor Albert I. Beach to an office behind that of the City Clerk. He also usurped the mayor at various civil functions.

The federal investigation of Pendergast alleged that McElroy received graft payments from city service providers, contractors for the many building projects (Municipal Auditorium, City Hall, Jackson County Courthouse), and city real estate purchases. McElroy resigned as city manager on April 13, 1939.

== Personal ==
McElroy married Marie S. Orbison in 1906. They had two children, Mary and Henry Jr. Marie died in 1920 and McElroy never remarried. He refused to delegate his child-rearing responsibilities. "I reared those children myself," McElroy was quoted, "because it was my duty. I supervised their baths, their food, their dressing, and their comings and goings. It was my job and no one else could do it." On May 27, 1933, his daughter Mary was kidnapped with a ransom demand of $30,000. McElroy paid the ransom. During the Pendergast investigation, it was discovered that the ransom was reimbursed with city funds. $16,000 was recovered and returned to the city when the kidnappers were caught. The Pendergast investigation severely affected McElroy's health. He died in his home in Kansas City, on September 15, 1939, aged 73, of uremia and heart disease, the day after subpoenas were issued by a grand jury.
