= Child abduction alert system =

Instrument used to alert the public in cases of disturbing disappearances of children

A child abduction alert system (also Child Alert, Amber alert or Child Rescue Alert) is a tool used to alert the public in cases of worrying or life-threatening disappearances of children.

== Europe ==
Currently, there are Child Alert systems in 21 European countries: Belgium, Bulgaria, Cyprus, the Czech Republic, France, Germany, Greece, Ireland, Italy, Lithuania, Luxembourg, Malta, the Netherlands, Poland, Portugal, Romania, Serbia, Slovakia, Spain, Switzerland and the United Kingdom. AMBER Alerts systems in Poland (2013), Slovakia (2015), Luxembourg (2016), Malta (2017), and Serbia (2023). These systems aim at quickly disseminating relevant information about a very worrying child disappearance to the general public at large, through a variety of channels, thus increasing the chances of finding the child.

=== AMBER Alert Europe ===
Logo AMBER Alert Europe

AMBER Alert Europe is a pan-European foundation established in 2013, operating as the European Centre for Missing Children. The organisation connects 85 organisations across 29 countries, including law enforcement authorities, government agencies, civil society organisations, and academic institutions, with the aim of improving the protection and recovery of missing children in Europe. AMBER Alert Europe advocates that one missing child is one too many and aims for zero missing children in Europe.

Its activities cover prevention and awareness-raising, training, research, and child alerting, as well as launching initiatives aimed at impacting policies and legislation in the area of children's rights. All activities are implemented in line with the EU Charter of Fundamental Rights and the EU Strategy on the Rights of the Child and with respect for the privacy of children and data protection laws.

==== Its beginnings ====
As a response to missing children cases exceeding geographical borders, the AMBER Alert Europe Foundation was founded in 2013 to contribute to better cross-border coordination and cooperation in the search for missing children.

Since then, its network has expanded and now encompasses different experts from a variety of backgrounds who make their know-how and experiences available to improve existing practices and procedures for a fast and safe recovery of children gone missing. Its joint efforts with police experts in the field of missing children even paved the way for a European police expert network in this area.

With the objective to prevent children from going missing, it also develop activities in the area of prevention, awareness-raising, research, and training together with its network of experts.

==== AMBER Alerts ====
If, after a proper risk assessment, it is believed that the life or health of a missing child is in imminent danger, police can decide to issue a national AMBER Alert. This allows them to instantly alert the public and make sure everyone is on the lookout for the child.

==== Life or death cases ====
Extensive US research, backed by UK findings, show that when a child is abducted and killed, in 76% of the cases the child was killed within three hours after the abduction. The AMBER Alert system was developed for these special ‘life or death’ cases.

Law enforcement agencies are responsible for issuing an AMBER Alert and use strict criteria. Below you can find the current criteria as recommended by the European Commission.

1. The victim is a minor (i.e. under 18 years of age);
2. It is a proven abduction, there are clear elements indicating that it could be a case of abduction;
3. The health or the life of the victim is at high risk;
4. Information is available which, once disseminated, will allow the victim to be located;
5. Publication of this information is not expected to add to the risk facing the victim.

==== Missing Child Alerts ====
The Police issue a Missing Child Alert when there is an immediate and significant risk of harm but the case does not reach the criteria for an AMBER Alert. Police can decide to publicize information and ask the help of citizens to recover the child.

However it is important to understand that Missing Child Alerts, for which a child alert system can be of use, constitute an average 1 to 2% of the total cases of missing children in Europe. While child alert systems can be of use in those 1 to 2%, the overall problem of missing children - of which an average of 60% concern children running away from situations of conflict, abuse, violence and neglect - requires a much more comprehensive approach, including measures aimed at prevention and empowerment.

Child alert tools have proven their value in a number of EU Member States. They however need to be integrated in a wider set of complementary tools including hotlines for missing children, trained law enforcement services, mediation services, social services and child protection services. Child alert systems can furthermore only function efficiently and legitimately where national agencies mandated to deal with missing children work on the basis of clear operational procedures including the necessary assessment of the child's best interest.

Where images of missing children are disseminated, it should be done with the consent of the parents or legal representative, and taking into account the need to balance the risks faced by the child with his or her right to privacy. In case of cross border alerts, clear procedures should be in place that allow to manage and control both the information shared with the public, as well the testimonies on sightings regarding the missing child received from the public. While using an efficient technology to disseminate information with the general public on missing children is valuable, the use of a powerful technology can be harmful if preconditions for 1) an effective best interest determination in each individual case and 2) the efficient management of the information, are not met. Therefore, the impact of this must be assessed by law enforcement agencies (e.g. police or public prosecutor) taking into consideration article 8 of the European Convention on Human Rights (ECHR) and national legislation. In the best interest of the child, information should be removed from public sources as soon as the child is being found.

Missing Children Europe, a European federation for missing and sexually exploited children also works on supporting the development of national child alert systems as well as effective cross-border cooperation for child alert systems. It is also the main partner working on developing the Google Child Alert System in Europe.

=== Belgium ===
Child alert is the operational system that in the case of a disappearance putting a child's life in immediate dangers, can warn citizens of Belgium and appeal to evidence that can contribute to the search. Any citizen or organization has the opportunity to register to participate. Child Alert is managed by Child Focus, in collaboration with the Federal police and the Belgian justice.

=== France ===
The child abduction alert system that is used in France is called Alerte Enlèvement. The system was introduced in February 2006 and is based on the US AMBER Alert system. The warning message will be issued for three hours by different vectors: TV channels, radio stations, news agencies, variable message signs on highways, public places, sound in stations and metro stations, websites, social media, and smartphone apps. Since the start of L'Alerte Enlèvement in 2006, it was issued 25 times [as of 14 April 2021]. It has a success rate of 92%, with 23 children found alive, one found dead and the 25th alert issued on 14 April being lifted without the child having been found. To issue an alert, five conditions must be met:

1. Removal proved and not simply disappear;
2. Physical integrity or the victim's life is in danger;
3. Pieces of information used to locate the child or suspect;
4. The victim is a minor;
5. The parents of the victim have agreed to trigger the alert.

=== The Netherlands ===
Logo AMBER Alert Netherlands

AMBER Alert Netherlands is the nationwide alert system for endangered missing children and child abduction cases.

AMBER Alert Netherlands exclusively distributes AMBER Alerts and information about endangered missing children. The police only issues an AMBER Alert when a child's life is in imminent danger (AMBER Alert) or when the child is at immediate and significant risk of harm (endangered missing child). When an AMBER Alert is issued (about 1-2 times a year), the entire system is deployed. The system enables the police to immediately alert press and public nationwide, using any medium available – from electronic highway signs, to TV, radio, social media such as Facebook and Twitter, pop-up and screensavers on PC's, large advertising screens (digital signage), e-mail, SMS text messages, smartphone apps, printable posters, RSS newsfeeds and website banners and pop-ups.

There are four key criteria in The Netherlands to be met before an AMBER Alert is issued, assessed by the Dutch National Police:

1. The missing child has to be younger than 18 years;
2. The life of the child is in imminent danger, or there is fear they will be seriously injured;
3. There is enough information about the victim to increase the chance of the child being found by means of an AMBER Alert, such as a photo, information about the abductor or a vehicle used;
4. The AMBER Alert must be used as soon as possible after the abduction or the child going missing has been reported.

Parts of the Dutch AMBER Alert system are being used for endangered missing children. A missing child is considered endangered when there is an immediate and significant risk of harm but the case does not reach the criteria for an AMBER Alert. The Dutch police can decide to publicize information and ask the help of citizens to recover the child.

=== United Kingdom ===
The UK has developed the Child Rescue Alert, similar to the American AMBER Alert. The system works in a way, where in the local area of the suspected abduction, radio and television broadcasts are immediately interrupted (even in some cases during mid-speech) and listeners/viewers are provided details of anything to look out for. Some counties include Variable message signs which alerts drivers on major roads to be on the lookout for that missing person or a car on the road.

In England, the counties of Hampshire, Leicestershire, Surrey, Sussex, Gloucestershire, Cambridgeshire, Bedfordshire, Norfolk, Derbyshire, Suffolk, Thames Valley, Wiltshire, and Somerset, and the London Metropolitan Police Service, have adopted a similar program called the Child Rescue Alert system. Sussex was the first to launch the system, on November 14, 2002. It is based on and has alert requirements similar to the American system.

There are four key criteria in the UK's system to be met before a Child Rescue Alert is issued:

- The child is apparently under 18 years old.
- There is a reasonable belief that the child has been kidnapped or abducted.
- There is reasonable belief that the child is in imminent danger of serious harm or death, and
- There is sufficient information available to enable the public to assist police in locating the child.

Members of the public will be encouraged to keep their eyes and ears open for anything that may help the police in finding the abducted child. If they see anything they should call the police on 999.

On 3 October 2012, the first child rescue alert since the system was introduced, was issued in the search for April Jones, who was abducted near her home in the market town of Machynlleth in Mid-Wales. News flashes are being used to interrupt local radio and programmes. Information is also being carried on motorway gantry displays and texted to the mobile phones of individuals who have signed up to the project.

In May 2014 a Child Rescue Alert distribution system will be launched which aims to distribute alert messages to members of the public and the media through SMS, email, Mobile app, website pop-ups, Twitter and Facebook as well as digital billboards operated by the members of the Outdoor Media Centre. The system is available so that, if the above criteria are met, a police force can rapidly alert the public and ask them to report anything useful on a dedicated police telephone number. SMS and email messages can be sent to people who have registered to receive them through the website and who live or work in the vicinity of the disappearance. The system is an initiative of CEOP, the Child Exploitation and On-Line Protection Centre, a command of the National Crime Agency, and is facilitated by the charity, Missing People, which promotes and operates the system. The technology is provided by Groupcall. The development, promotion and operation of the system is funded initially by the players of the People's Postcode Lottery via the Dreamfund, the European Union and through the help of other supporters.

== North America ==
The AMBER Alert system is a notification to the general public, by media outlets in Canada and in the United States, issued when police confirm that a child has been abducted. AMBER is a backronym for America's Missing: Broadcasting Emergency Response, and was named after a 9-year-old girl named Amber Hagerman, who was abducted and murdered in Arlington, Texas, in 1996.

== See also ==
- Child Abduction Response Team
- Missing Kids Website
- National Center for Missing and Exploited Children
