= Burgernet =

Burgernet logo

Burgernet (Citizen Network) is a platform for collaboration between citizens, local government and police aiming to improve neighbourhood security in the Netherlands. The project was developed in 1993 by a police officer from Ridderkerk to help find missing persons and catch criminals with assistance of citizens.

== How it works ==
Citizens register for Burgernet on the Burgernet website by providing their name and address. They are now able to receive Burgernet messages about their neighborhood. Burgernet starts with an emergency call (for example mugging, burglary or missing person.) If it is possible to compose a distinctive description of the suspect or missing person the police emergency room activates the Burgernet community by sending a text message (Sms) or spoken message. Burgernet participants in the immediate environment of the crime receive a message with a call to action to look for the suspect/ missing person. They report to the police what they see or recently have seen. The Burgernet system enables attentive participants to report directly to the police operator. This gives the possibility to process real time information quickly. With the information given by the participant the operator directs nearby police units to the missing or suspect person. All participants are informed about the results of the intervention.

== History ==
A test with Burgernet was executed in Nieuwegein in 2004 and 2005. After extensive research, the test was found successful and extended to 9 municipalities in 2006. In 2009 Dutch government decided Burgernet would be put into service nationwide. In 2012 Burgernet was activated in nearly all of the 400 Dutch communities. More than 1,4 million citizens joined Burgernet (9% of Dutch population). The Burgernet app has been downloaded 240.000 times and the Burgernet messages are embedded in over 30.000 Twitter timelines (reference date November 2014). On average Burgernet is used in 600 time-critical situations each month (January – August 2014 4.958 actions). 555 were solved thanks to information given by Burgernet participants (11%). Source: Burgernet dashboard

== Evolution ==
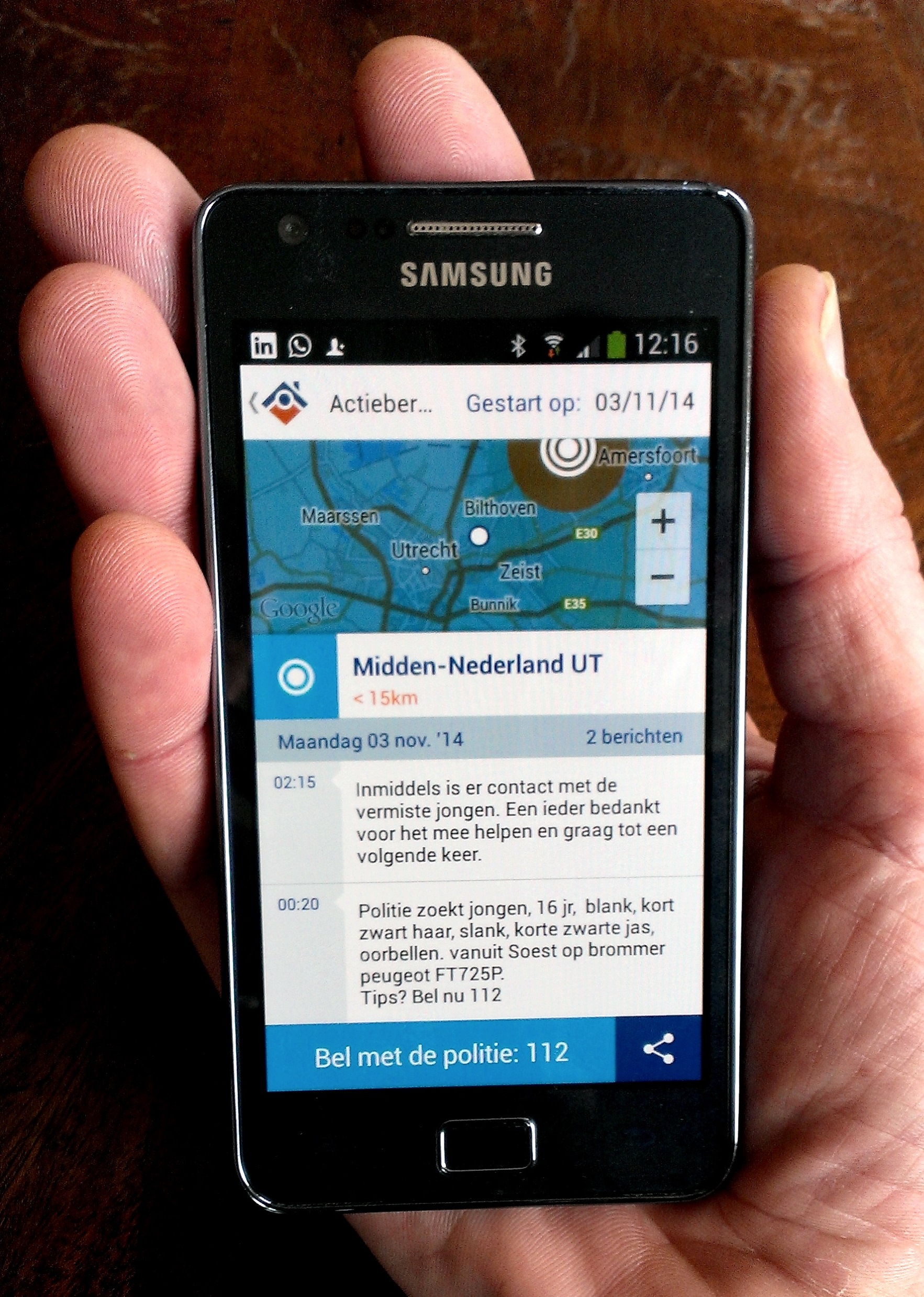
Burgernet app (Android)

Throughout the years the Burgernet system has been constantly improved. Since 2011 the Burgernet messages are automatically transformed into short messages send by RSS feed to social media. In 2013 the Burgernet app was launched. This application uses the location of the smartphone user to relocate the Burgernet actions which take place in the immediate environment of the user. In 2014 Burgernet was extended with a mail service. Participants receive e-mails related to local security issues such as recently committed burglaries. The local municipality can use the service to inform their citizens about local security issues.

== Remarkable ==
Burgernet was one of the first initiatives Dutch police has taken to actively involve citizens as fully-fledged partners in police operations.

The Burgernet colours (Orange and Blue) refers to the participants. A slang word for police is "The Blue". Orange is the official colour of Dutch municipalities.
