= Masonic Child Identification Programs =

Charitable initiative by North American Masonic lodges

Masonic Child Identification Programs (CHIP) are a charitable initiative by North American Masonic lodges to aid in the identification and recovery of missing children. CHIP programs are supported monetarily at the Grand Lodge level, and are staffed by volunteers from subordinate lodges as well as law enforcement and dental professionals.

The CHIP programs allow parents the opportunity to create a kit of identifying materials for their child, free of charge. The kit contains a fingerprint card, a physical description, a VHS tape, computer disk, or DVD of the child, a dental imprint, and a DNA sample. The purpose of the kit is to provide critical information to the public and to law enforcement in the event that a child is reported missing. The program has been lauded by the National Center for Missing and Exploited Children.

The VHS tape or DVD, besides a video capturing appearance and voice, includes data tailored to the child's age group that can assist in finding children who might be missing for reasons besides abduction.

The Masonic Child ID Program has been referenced by state and local law enforcement agencies as their model for establishing this service. The difference between Masonic CHIP and others is that municipal and law enforcement agencies typically place all data that is collected (including fingerprints) into a database. The Masonic Child ID Program operates with strict confidentiality, with all data on portable computers being removed from systems immediately after the DVD data has been written. If the DVD or VHS tape is lost, a parent or guardian must attend another Masonic Child ID event to obtain a new copy.
