= Parental child abduction =

Kidnapping of a child by their parent

Parental child abduction is the hiding, taking, or keeping hold of a child by a parent while defying the rights of the child's other parent or guardian.

This abduction often occurs when the parents separate or begin divorce proceedings. One parent may take or retain the child to gain an advantage in subsequent child-custody proceedings. One parent may refuse to return the child at the end of an access visit or flee with the child to prevent an access visit, possibly fearing domestic violence and abuse. It can also occur when a child has been, is about to be, or parent(s) fear that they will be taken into the care of authorities, typically due to child endangerment proceedings.

== Definitions and legal considerations ==
Depending on the laws of the state or country in which an abduction occurs, this may or may not constitute a criminal offense. For example, removing a child from the UK for 28 days without the other parent's permission (or a person with parental responsibility) is a criminal offense. In many states of the United States, absent a formal custody order, if the parents are not living together, the removal of a child by one parent is not an offense.

=== United States ===
Many US states have criminalized interstate child abduction.

== History ==
Newspapers did not begin printing articles on crimes until the 1820s. Thus, most documentation of early parental child abduction is found in legal debt disclaimers placed as (usually formulaic) ads in newspapers. One of these, established by William Holt in the New Hampshire Gazette (Portsmouth) on May 9, 1760, describes the father's desire to have his child returned to him and his willingness to cover his wife's debts if this were done. He offered to forgive his wife if she returned to him. Debt disclaimer ads that describe parental child abductions were standard from the mid-18th century through the 1830s.

The Tuthell case supplies a rare exception in that the resolution of the issue was reported in newspapers because the searching parent, Edward B. Tuthell of Monroe, New York, had published an ad (which was reprinted in other newspapers) offering a hefty reward of $300 (a combined tip, with a $200 bonus for locating the two adults and $100 for safely returning the child to the father). In one appearance, the ad was headlined: "300 Dollars Reward. The Public is earnestly requested to apprehend a finished villain," Mrs. Tuthell had run off on July 3, 1810, with one Charles D. Walsingham, who was wanted for fraud in another matter, taking the 7-month-old baby, Susan. Eventually, the adulterers and child were located, and Walshingham, faced with capture, committed suicide.

== International child abduction ==
International child abduction occurs when a parent, relative, or acquaintance of a child leaves the country with the child or children in violation of a custody decree or visitation order. Another related situation is retention, where children are taken on an alleged vacation to a foreign country and are not returned.

While the number of international child abductions is small compared to domestic cases, they are often the most difficult to resolve due to the involvement of conflicting national jurisdictions. Two-thirds of international parental abduction cases involve mothers who often allege domestic violence. Even when a treaty agreement governs the case, the court may be reluctant to return the child if the return could result in the permanent separation from the primary caregiver. This could occur if the abducting parent faced criminal prosecution or deportation in the child's home country.

The Hague Convention on the Civil Aspects of International Child Abduction is an international human rights treaty and legal mechanism to address children taken to another country. In many cases, the Hague Convention does not provide relief, resulting in some parents hiring private parties to recover their children.

By 2007, the United States, European authorities, and NGOs had taken interest in mediation as a means to resolve international cases.

== See also ==
- Kidnapping in the United States
- Kidnapping in Canada
- Child custody
