= Midland City, Alabama =

- Town

- Flag

- Location of Midland City in Dale County, Alabama.
- Coordinates: 31°19′02″N 85°30′06″W
- Country: United States
- State: Alabama
- County: Dale

Government
  - Type: Mayor-council
  - Mayor: Cynthia "Cindy" Gary

Area
  - Total: 6.06 sq mi (15.69 km^{2})
  - Land: 6.06 sq mi (15.69 km^{2})
  - Water: 0 sq mi (0.00 km^{2})
- Elevation: 371 ft (113 m)

Population (2020)
  - Total: 2,239
  - Density: 369.6/sq mi (142.71/km^{2})
- Time zone: UTC-6 (Central (CST))
  - Summer (DST): UTC-5 (CDT)
- ZIP code: 36350
- Area code: 334
- FIPS code: 01-48400
- GNIS feature ID: 2406160
- Website: cityofmidlandcity.org

Midland City is a town in Dale County, Alabama, United States. As of the 2020 census, Midland City had a population of 2,239. It incorporated in 1890. It is part of the Ozark Micropolitan Statistical Area.

== History ==
=== 2013 hostage standoff ===
On January 29, 2013, 65-year-old Vietnam War-era veteran Jimmy Lee Dykes climbed aboard a school bus and fatally shot the driver; he then abducted at random a five-year-old boy named Ethan, who was sitting at the closest seat. He took Ethan into an underground bunker, where he held him captive. About a week after the incident, FBI agents were able to storm the bunker, kill Dykes, and rescue Ethan.

== Geography ==
Midland City is located in southeastern Dale County. It is bordered to the east by the town of Napier Field, to the southeast by the city of Dothan, and to the west by the town of Pinckard. U.S. Route 231 passes through the town, leading northwest 13 miles (21 km) to Ozark, the Dale County seat, and southeast 9 miles (14 km) to the center of Dothan. Alabama State Route 134 passes through the center of Midland City, leading east 10 miles (16 km) to Headland and west 7 miles (11 km) to Newton via Pinckard.

According to the U.S. Census Bureau, Midland City has a total area of 6.1 square miles (15.7 km^{2}), all land.

== Demographics ==
Historical population
Census	Pop.	Note	%±
1900	304		—
1910	539		77.3%
1920	665		23.4%
1930	755		13.5%
1940	647		−14.3%
1950	784		21.2%
1960	854		8.9%
1970	1,172		37.2%
1980	1,903		62.4%
1990	1,819		−4.4%
2000	1,703		−6.4%
2010	2,344		37.6%
2020	2,239		−4.5%
U.S. Decennial Census; 2013 Estimate

=== 2020 census ===
As of the 2020 census, there were 2,239 people, 818 households, and 465 families residing in the town. The median age was 33.2 years. 26.1% of residents were under the age of 18 and 12.6% of residents were 65 years of age or older. For every 100 females there were 83.8 males, and for every 100 females age 18 and over there were 75.9 males age 18 and over.

10.1% of residents lived in urban areas, while 89.9% lived in rural areas.

Among households in Midland City, 33.1% had children under the age of 18 living in them. Of all households, 31.4% were married-couple households, 17.8% were households with a male householder and no spouse or partner present, and 44.6% were households with a female householder and no spouse or partner present. About 35.1% of all households were made up of individuals and 11.2% had someone living alone who was 65 years of age or older.

There were 1,023 housing units, of which 7.4% were vacant. The homeowner vacancy rate was 3.6% and the rental vacancy rate was 4.7%.

Racial composition as of the 2020 census
Race	Number	Percent
White	1,201	53.6%
Black or African American	838	37.4%
American Indian and Alaska Native	7	0.3%
Asian	14	0.6%
Native Hawaiian and Other Pacific Islander	1	0.0%
Some other race	47	2.1%
Two or more races	131	5.9%
Hispanic or Latino (of any race)	79	3.5%

=== 2010 census ===
At the 2010 census there were 2,344 people, 944 households, and 636 families in the town. The population density was 392 inhabitants per square mile (151/km^{2}). There were 1,014 housing units at an average density of 169 per square mile (65/km^{2}). The racial makeup of the town was 70.4% White, 23.3% Black or African American, 0.5% Native American, 0.4% Asian, 1.7% from other races, and 3.7% from two or more races. 4.1% of the population were Hispanic or Latino of any race. Of the 944 households 32.9% had children under the age of 18 living with them, 37.6% were married couples living together, 22.4% had a female householder with no husband present, and 32.6% were non-families. 26.9% of households were one person and 7.5% were one person aged 65 or older. The average household size was 2.48 and the average family size was 2.98.

The age distribution was 28.0% under the age of 18, 10.8% from 18 to 24, 28.4% from 25 to 44, 22.4% from 45 to 64, and 10.5% 65 or older. The median age was 31.6 years. For every 100 females, there were 90.4 males. For every 100 females age 18 and over, there were 88.4 males.

The median household income was $29,591 and the median family income was $39,071. Males had a median income of $33,305 versus $23,897 for females. The per capita income for the town was $16,283. About 26.7% of families and 27.0% of the population were below the poverty line, including 36.9% of those under age 18 and 11.0% of those age 65 or over.

=== 2000 census ===
At the 2000 census there were 1,703 people, 707 households, and 477 families in the town. The population density was 282.1 inhabitants per square mile (108.9/km^{2}). There were 805 housing units at an average density of 133.3 per square mile (51.5/km^{2}). The racial makeup of the town was 70.58% White, 25.19% Black or African American, 0.70% Native American, 0.35% Asian, 0.12% from other races, and 3.05% from two or more races. 0.76% of the population were Hispanic or Latino of any race. Of the 707 households 34.5% had children under the age of 18 living with them, 40.7% were married couples living together, 21.4% had a female householder with no husband present, and 32.5% were non-families. 28.7% of households were one person and 10.5% were one person aged 65 or older. The average household size was 2.41 and the average family size was 2.93.

The age distribution was 29.7% under the age of 18, 8.6% from 18 to 24, 27.2% from 25 to 44, 21.6% from 45 to 64, and 12.9% 65 or older. The median age was 34 years. For every 100 females, there were 89.2 males. For every 100 females age 18 and over, there were 82.3 males.

The median household income was $20,000 and the median family income was $24,474. Males had a median income of $26,927 versus $17,174 for females. The per capita income for the town was $11,438. About 26.0% of families and 30.8% of the population were below the poverty line, including 44.1% of those under age 18 and 22.2% of those age 65 or over.

== See also ==
- 2013 Alabama bunker hostage crisis
