= Mary McElroy (kidnapping victim) =

American kidnapping victim

- Born: November 25, 1907; Kansas City, Missouri, U.S.
- Died: January 21, 1940 (aged 32); Kansas City, Missouri, U.S.
- Cause of death: Self-inflicted gunshot wound
- Known for: Kidnapping victim

Mary McElroy (November 25, 1907 – January 21, 1940) was an American kidnapping victim. She was the daughter of Henry F. 'Judge' McElroy, City Manager of Kansas City, Missouri.

== Kidnapping ==
Twenty five-year-old McElroy was kidnapped while taking a bubble bath in her father's house on the evening of May 27, 1933. Her abductors were brothers George and Walter McGee, Clarence Click, and Clarence Stevens. Walter McGee, a divorced ex-con from Oregon, was the gang leader. McGee and Stevens donned masks, forced their way into the house with a sawed-off shotgun, and allowed McElroy time to dry herself and get dressed. She apparently did not take them very seriously; when told that $60,000 was going to be demanded in exchange for her release, she joked "I'm worth more than that!"

McElroy was taken to a farmhouse in Shawnee, Kansas owned by Click, where she was chained to a wall in the basement and sexually assaulted by McGee repeatedly. After demanding the original sum of $60,000, the kidnappers settled for $30,000, which Judge McElroy paid on May 29. Mary McElroy was released near the Millburn Golf Course after twenty-nine hours in captivity. George McGee and Clarence Click were apprehended some time before June 21. Walter McGee was arrested in Amarillo, Texas on June 2 after attempting to purchase a car with some of the ransom money. Of the original sum, about $9,000 was recovered from McGee's person. About $16,000 of the original ransom was recovered.

== Trial ==
The kidnapping and subsequent trial were a media sensation. The trial took place in Jefferson City. According to reports, McElroy evinced crippling shame and embarrassment when questioned. She related that Walter McGee had ordered her to strip naked before releasing her so that they could be sure she was not smuggling evidence; she refused and they did not force her. She also displayed difficulty in identifying her abductors in court when called to do so. She insisted that she had been well treated and had even been given flowers by Walter before her release. During the trial, McElroy met with relatives of her kidnappers and publicly expressed sympathy for them.

Suffering a nervous breakdown on February 10, she disappeared from her father's home, surfacing a day later in Illinois after sending her father a telegram from Springfield which read: "Sorry but I am so frightened. I don't know what I'm doing." She was found in Normal and brought back to Missouri where she explained her irrational departure to the authorities: "I felt like a murderer... I wanted to getaway. I couldn't stand sitting still." Because he had masterminded the kidnapping, Walter McGee was given the harshest sentence. On March 30, 1935, his sentence, death by hanging, was announced; had it occurred, McGee would have been the first person to be executed for kidnapping in the United States.

After an execution date was set for May 10, Mary McElroy shocked everyone by contesting the penalty. In April 1935, she wrote to Governor Guy Brasfield Park: "Walter McGee's sentence has hung as heavily over me as over him. Through punishing a guilty man, his victim will be made to suffer equally... In pleading for Walter McGee's life I am pleading for my own peace of mind." McGee was granted a stay of execution by Park on May 7; McElroy's father publicly backed her plea for this stay of execution. His sentence was eventually commuted to life in prison.

== Life after the kidnapping ==
The abduction and the subsequent fallout proved to be extremely traumatic for Mary McElroy, and she suffered several 'nervous collapses' in her years after the case. She lived with her father, Judge McElroy for most of her adult life. His death in 1939 devastated her, and she became increasingly reclusive.

On January 21, 1940, her maid discovered McElroy's body in her bedroom; she had committed suicide, shooting herself in the head with a small pistol. She left a suicide note which read: "My four kidnappers are probably the four people on earth who don't consider me an utter fool. You have your death penalty now - so - please - give them a chance. Mary." McElroy was 32. At the time of her death, Walter and George McGee (34 and 29 respectively) were still in prison, Clarence Click had been released in 1938, and Clarence Stevens was still at large.

== See also ==
- List of kidnappings
