= 2013 Alabama bunker hostage crisis =

2013 American murder and hostage crisis

- Location of Midland City in Dale County within the U.S. state of Alabama
- Location: Midland City, Alabama, U.S.
- Date: January 29, 2013 – February 4, 2013 c. 3:30 p.m. – 3:12 p.m. (CST)
- Target: Two children aboard a school bus
- Attack type: Bus hijacking, hostage crisis, murder
- Weapon: Ruger Handgun
- Deaths: 2 (including the perpetrator)
- Victims: Charles Albert Poland, Jr. (killed on January 29)
- Perpetrator: Jimmy Lee Dykes

On January 29, 2013, a hostage crisis, lasting almost seven days, began in the Wiregrass Region near U.S. Highway 231 in Midland City, Alabama. Jimmy Lee Dykes, a 65-year-old Vietnam War-era veteran, boarded a Dale County school bus, killed the driver, and took a five-year-old boy hostage. On the afternoon of February 4, law enforcement agents entered the bunker, killed Dykes, and rescued the child.

== Details ==
=== Bus driver killing ===
Just after 3:30 p.m., Dykes boarded a Dale County school bus that was stopped in Midland City and told the driver that he wanted to take two children, six and eight years old, both boys, from the bus. The school bus driver, 66-year-old Charles Albert Poland, Jr., refused to let him take the children and challenged Dykes to shoot him. He blocked access to the aisle of the bus while Dykes continued to argue with him.

Dykes fired five shots, killing Poland, and left the bus taking Ethan Gilman, a five-year-old from Midland City Elementary School, with him. After he had left the bus with Gilman, the students on the bus left through the front door, having to pass by the body of Poland, whom many of them had known for years. A driver on the highway noticed the children running out onto the street. The driver, Michele Pfannenstiel, stopped and spoke to the children which led to her dialing 911 as well. Authorities indicated that there was no pre-existing relationship between Dykes and the hostage. Fifteen-year-old Tre' Watts, who was present on the bus, was the first person to call 911; he began the call when Dykes boarded the bus.

=== Child abduction ===
After the shooting, Dykes took Gilman to a 6-foot by 8-foot underground bunker on his property. The bunker contained homemade bombs and was equipped with a PVC ventilation pipe. Hostage negotiators cooperated with Dykes in an attempt to obtain Gilman's release and to bring the situation to a favorable conclusion.

=== Negotiations ===
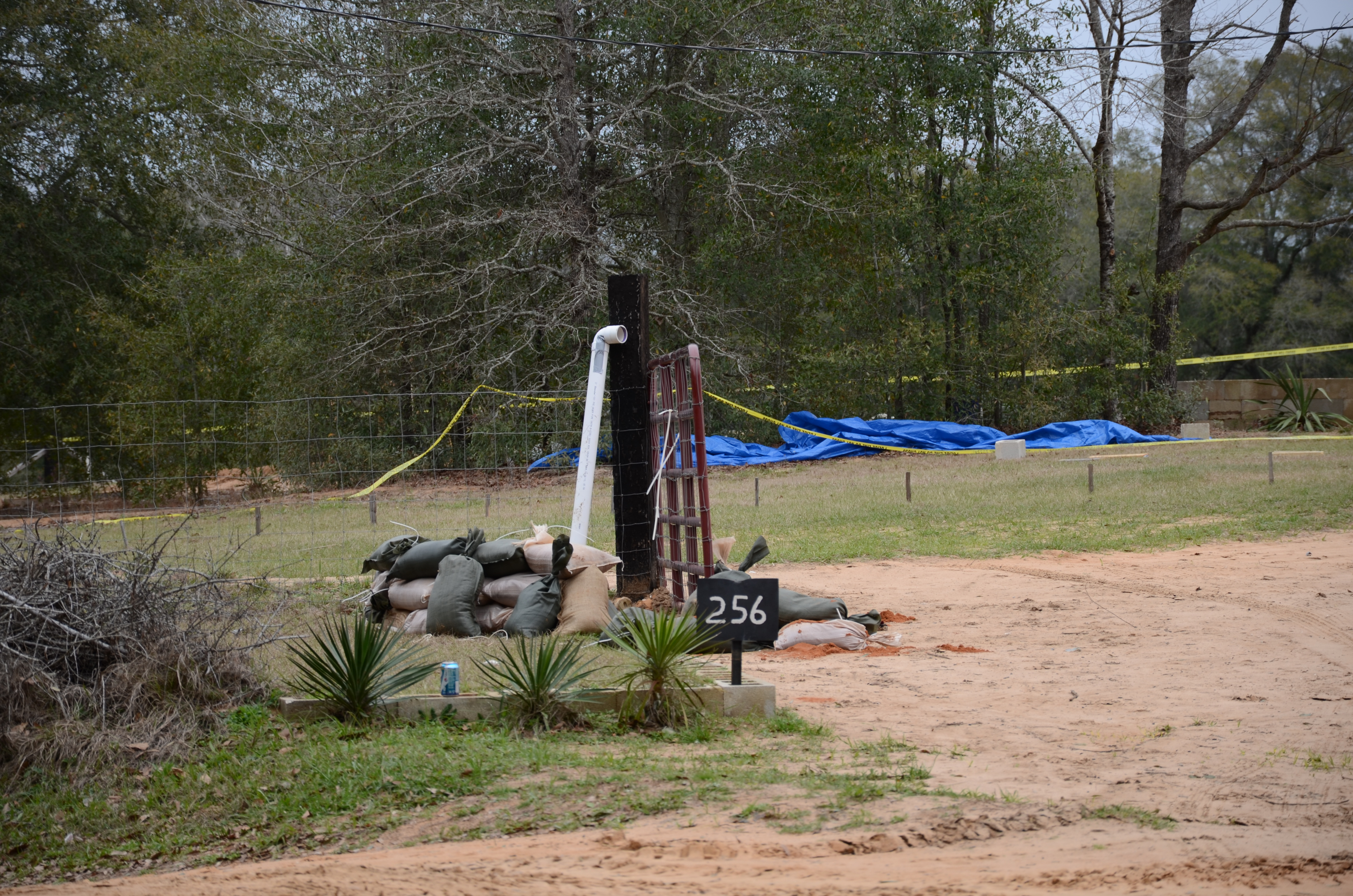
The PVC pipe used by Dykes for communication.

Soon after the shooting and abduction, Dykes called 911 and gave instructions on how to communicate with him. FBI hostage negotiators arrived at the bunker and began communicating with Dykes through the ventilation pipe, as he instructed.

Because Gilman had Asperger's syndrome and ADHD, Dykes accepted medication for him, sent through the PVC pipe along with a coloring book and crayons. It was later confirmed that Dykes wanted a specific female reporter to hold his hand while broadcasting him live from the bunker, and that he would commit suicide on live television. Investigators also revealed that he had been "training" Gilman to detonate the improvised explosive devices inside the bunker.

=== Rescue ===
On February 4, 2013, at 3:12 p.m. CST, the FBI's Hostage Rescue Team breached the roof of the bunker using explosive charges after negotiations began to break down and they saw, using a hidden camera, Dykes holding a gun. The agents threw stun grenades into the bunker before exchanging gunfire with Dykes, killing him, and rescuing the boy. Gilman was taken to the hospital and was reported to be in good condition. According to sources, two improvised explosive devices were discovered, one inside the PVC pipe, the other inside the bunker.

== Perpetrator ==
Jimmy Dykes, a decorated Vietnam War Navy veteran, was identified as the gunman. He lived in isolation and supposedly lost contact with his two daughters years before the incident, according to people who lived near him. He previously lived in Florida, where he was arrested for brandishing a gun in 1995. In 2000, he was arrested for marijuana possession charges. He moved to Midland City, where he beat a neighbor's dog to death with an iron pipe when it walked onto his property, warned children not to enter his property, and built a speed bump to prevent motorists from driving too fast down the street. Dykes was also known to have patrolled his property at night with a shotgun and a flashlight. The day prior to the standoff, he was due in court for a hearing on a menacing case in which he allegedly fired a gun at neighbors. Dykes had cleared a path on his property for school buses to take, and he had started speaking to Charles Poland weeks prior to the incident.

== Aftermath ==
The following week, on February 14, 2013, Dr. Phil interviewed Gilman and his mother, Jennifer Kirkland, who had been raising Gilman since he was three years old; Gilman had earlier been raised in the Dale County, Alabama foster care system due to Kirkland's substance abuse issues. On February 26, the bunker where Dykes held him captive was demolished by officials, who stated that it posed "a biological risk". Soon after, Kirkland returned to substance abuse, leading to Gilman being raised by his grandmother, then by his 18-year-old brother when the grandmother died, until being adopted by the Turners – a local minister and his wife who had met then-toddler Gilman during his first round of foster care. As of February 2019, just days after the sixth anniversary of the end of the bunker crisis, the family was living in Dothan, Alabama, where the newly-turned 12-year-old Gilman (now Ethan Turner) was in fifth grade at a local elementary school.

Alabama Code Title 13A. Criminal Code § 13A-7-4.2, known as the Charles "Chuck" Poland, Jr. Act, forbids trespass onto a school bus. It was named for Charles Poland, Jr., the school bus driver killed by Dykes. The act was signed into law by Governor Robert J. Bentley in June 2013.

== See also ==
- 1976 Chowchilla kidnapping
- List of kidnappings
- List of solved missing person cases (post-2000)
