= Federal Law Enforcement Officers Association =

Federal lobbying organisation

The Federal Law Enforcement Officers Association is a nonpartisan and nonprofit professional lobbying organization for federal law enforcement officers and agents, including those from the Federal Bureau of Prisons (FBOP),Federal Bureau of Investigation (FBI), Drug Enforcement Administration (DEA), Bureau of Alcohol, Tobacco, Firearms and Explosives (BAFTE), Department of Homeland Security (DHS), Secret Service (USSS), Federal Air Marshal Service (FAMS), Immigration and Customs Enforcement (ICE), Homeland Security Investigations (HSI), Customs and Border Protection (CBP), and Marshals Service (USMS).

== History and stances ==
In 1986, FLEOA opposed the Firearm Owners Protection Act, which softened the 1968 Gun Control Act. It was introduced by Sen. James A. McClure, supported by the National Rifle Association of America (NRA). The law banned the creation of a national gun registry. A compromise was reached in the House, allowing William J. Hughes's amendment banning new automatic weapon ownership. Despite the objections of FLEOA, Police Foundation, IACP, FOP, Troopers, PERF, Sheriffs, NOBLE, Brotherhood, NAPO and the New York City Police Commissioner, the bill passed and was signed by Ronald Reagan in May 1986.

In April 2000, then-New York City Mayor Rudy Giuliani described Border Patrol BORTAC agents involved in the seizure of Elian Gonzalez as "storm troopers" at least six times. FLEOA reacted with "strong disgust and dismay" to the Nazi imagery and demanded Giuliani's apology. Hillary Clinton, then running against Giuliani for a Senate seat, agreed with FLEOA in asking for an apology. He refused to apologize, though stated his criticism was aimed at Bill Clinton and AG Janet Reno. Giuliani withdrew from the race for unrelated reasons.

In 2007, Jon Adler, then Executive Vice President of FLEOA, called Blackwater "the Cadillac of training services. You've got the best of the best teaching close-quarter-combat techniques." Blackwater was amidst criticism of their actions in Iraq and Afghanistan at the time, including the 2004 Fallujah ambush and 2007 Nisour Square massacre. The company and its head, Erik Prince were being scrutinized by the US House Oversight Committee, Iraqi courts, and others.

Following an April 2012 US Secret Service prostitution scandal in Colombia, FLEOA's general counsel, Lawrence Berger, represented the agents; at least some were FLEOA members. Adler praised the Secret Service investigation, downplaying need for a congressional committee hearing. After a Justice Department Inspector General investigation following the 2012 prostitution scandal, it was found agents who attended drug cartel-funded parties for several years, where they received money, gifts, weapons, and encounters with prostitutes who were paid by the cartel. When the report came out in 2015, Michele Leonhart, DEA's head since 2007, received a bipartisan no-confidence vote from 22 of 43 House Oversight Committee members. FLEOA's Adler stated Leonhart "has our full and unwavering support", calling out House members for having "temper tantrums" at her committee hearing.

FLEOA president Jon Adler endorsed full-body scanners at airports in 2010, denying they are an invasion of privacy, stating "I think a bomb detonating on a plane is the biggest invasion of privacy a person can experience."

FLEOA endorsed Loretta Lynch as AG in 2014. She had previously been honored by the association.

The group has lobbied for TSA officers at airport checkpoints to be armed, which was discussed after an agent was shot to death at Los Angeles International Airport in 2013.

In 2015, FLEOA endorsed Sen. Jeff Sessions and Rep. David Jolly's "Thin Blue Line Act". It did not pass. The association also objected to substantial reform of the Patriot Act contained in the 2015 USA Freedom Act. The bill passed with compromise. FLEOA encouraged the reintroduction of the 2013 Blue Alert Act in the 2015 session, which would extend systems like the Amber alert or Silver Alert for alerts about attacks on police, stating it would "help combat the rise of targeted violence against law enforcement officers and those that seek to attack the American way of life".

Also in 2015, FLEOA strongly objected to a Bloomberg editorial by author Adam Minter, which noted the costs of the Air Marshal program, which had an estimated 3500 agents, $825 million annual budget, and no data to back its usefulness. The program was created in 1961 after a spate of hijackings and there were nearly 1800 agents by 1970. However, by 9/11 it only had 35 agents and an annual budget under $5 million. FLEOA's response said "There are no statistics to quantify their successfulness", stating they have obviously done their job, since there were no cockpit takeovers in the United States since 9/11.

In 2016, FLEOA endorsed the November 2016 announced nomination of Jeff Sessions as Trump's first Attorney General, highlighting their shared objection to "the mythology of sentencing reform". Sessions later rescinded the lenient sentencing reform put in place by Obama and AG Eric Holder. That same year, FLEOA denounced the Occupation of the Malheur National Wildlife Refuge, rebuking White House Press Secretary Josh Earnest, who called it a "local law enforcement matter". Adler stated "The illegal takeover of any federal property is a criminal act and all those involved should be arrested and federally prosecuted."

FLEOA backed the FBI in the FBI–Apple encryption dispute over Apple's refusal to unlock an iPhone used in the 2015 San Bernardino attack, joining other groups in an amicus brief, stating "public safety will suffer. Crimes will go unsolved and criminals will go free", and "as real as a killer gone free, as real as a pedophile planning for his next prey". The FBI paid for a $1.3 million third-party tool to crack the phone, and then dropped the suit against Apple. The phone was later found not contain relevant information, and an investigation highlighted the FBI's poor intra-agency communication on their digital forensic tools.

In 2017, FLEOA endorsed the expansion of DNA collection for law enforcement. It also endorsed the early March 2017 nomination of Rod Rosenstein as Deputy AG under Jeff Sessions.

During a 2018 Senate confirmation hearing for Ronald Vitiello as head of ICE, Senator Gary Peters brought up a 2015 tweet from Vitiello, where he suggested to Mark Levin that the Democratic Party be renamed the "liberalcratic party or the NeoKlanist party". Vitiello said it was intended as a direct message to Marc Levin, was a joke, and was sorry it caused offense; Kamala Harris echoed Peters' reply, grilling him on why that was a poor comparison. When Vitiello said the KKK "tried to use fear and force" against "race and ethnicity", Harris asked if Vitiello saw parallels between ICE and the KKK, especially with ICE's enforcement of the Trump administration family separation policy. This led to a strong reaction from Fox News's Trish Regan and a strong letter to Harris from FLEOA, calling it a "broad-brush character assassination" on ICE agents. In response, Harris said Vitiello "owes the American people a clear explanation as to whether such inflammatory and divisive language reflects his beliefs."

FLEOA endorsed Trump's 2018 rejection of California's sanctuary city policies, as well as lawsuits and acts to enforce Trump's executive order. The California lawsuits were rejected, allowing the state's actions to stand. They also endorsed civil asset forfeiture and AG Jeff Sessions's rollback of Obama-era restrictions. FLEOA awarded ICE's acting director, Thomas Homan, with their "National Law Enforcement Leader of the Year" award in April 2018.

In 2020, Larry Cosme, president of FLEOA, was at Donald Trump's signing of an executive order called "Safe Policing for Safe Communities" on June 16, 2020, amidst George Floyd protests about police brutality. Cosme called it "a great step moving forward", thanking Trump. While the association is nonpolitical, they endorsed Trump in 2016. FLEOA also successfully lobbied Senator Tim Scott and Attorney General William Barr to water down Scott's Republican police reform bill, the Justice Act (S.3985).

FLEOA has spent $400,000 on lobbying since Trump's inauguration.

== Membership ==
FLEOA has stated their membership numbers through the years:

- 1989: 6,000
- 2000: 17,500
- 2014: 25,000
- 2017: 26,000
- 2018:26,000
- 2019:27,000
- 2020:29,000
- 2021:30,000
- 2022:32,000

== Leadership ==
- Timothy Danahey, 2003
- Art Gordon, 2007–2008
- Jon Adler, 2010–2014
- Nathan R. Catura, 2016–2018
- Larry Cosme, 2019–2023
- Matthew Silverman, 2023–present
