= Blue Alert =

Blue alert may refer to:

- Blue Alert (album), a 2006 album by singer Anjani
- "Blue Alert" (song), from the 2012 Sylvia Brooks album Restless
- National Blue Alert Act of 2013, a proposed Act of Congress
