= Fiber-optic display =

Display using fiber optics

A fiber-optic display is a light-emitting display that uses fiber optics to display images or text. Fiber-optic displays can either be static or dynamic, with the typical lighting source being halogen light bulbs.

== Static fiber optic displays ==
Static fiber optic displays have been commonly used for some types of traffic signals. One common use for static fiber optic displays are lane control lights, which display either a green downward-pointing arrow or a red X to indicate the open/closed status of road lanes.

== Dynamic fiber optic displays ==
Dynamic fiber optic displays typically display alphanumeric text, and utilize electromechanical shutters to open or close the ends of the fiber strands to display an alphanumeric pixel. These types of displays were commonly used as variable-message signs on highways. Compared to eggcrate displays, dynamic fiber optic displays offered lower energy consumption due to requiring fewer bulbs, and offered improved nighttime legibility. For daytime legibility, they were sometimes combined with flip-disc displays to be reflective in daylight and emissive at night.
