= Variable-message sign =

Electronic traffic sign with changeable messages

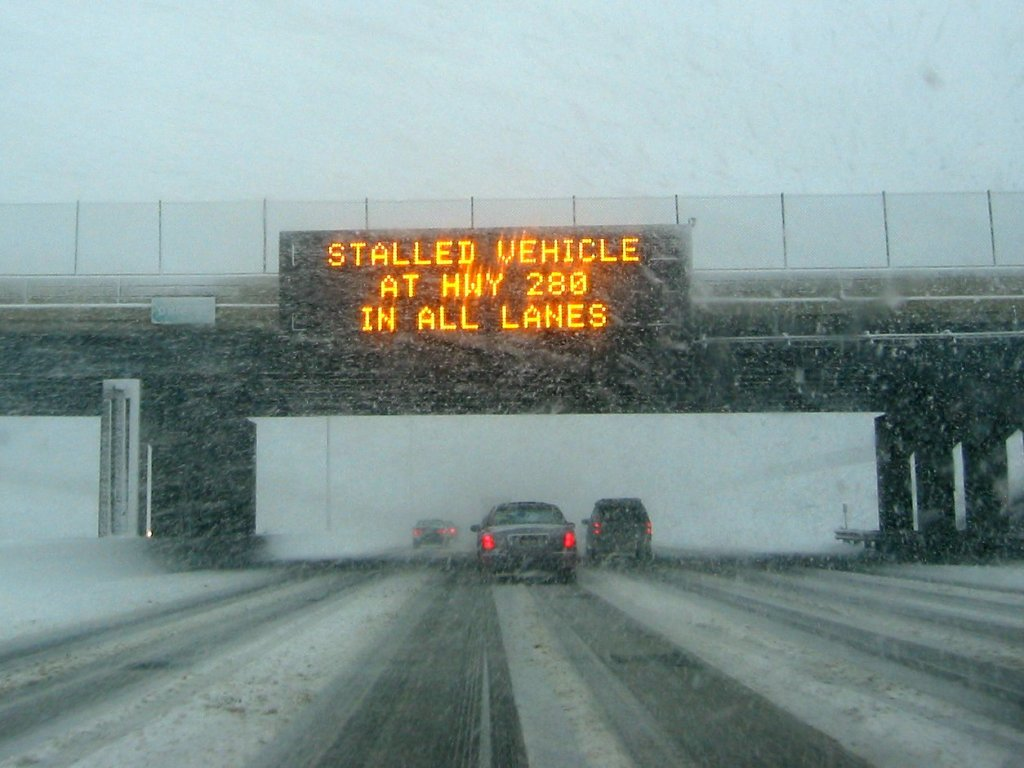
LED matrix sign over I-94 in Saint Paul, Minnesota, advising of a road blockage during a winter storm

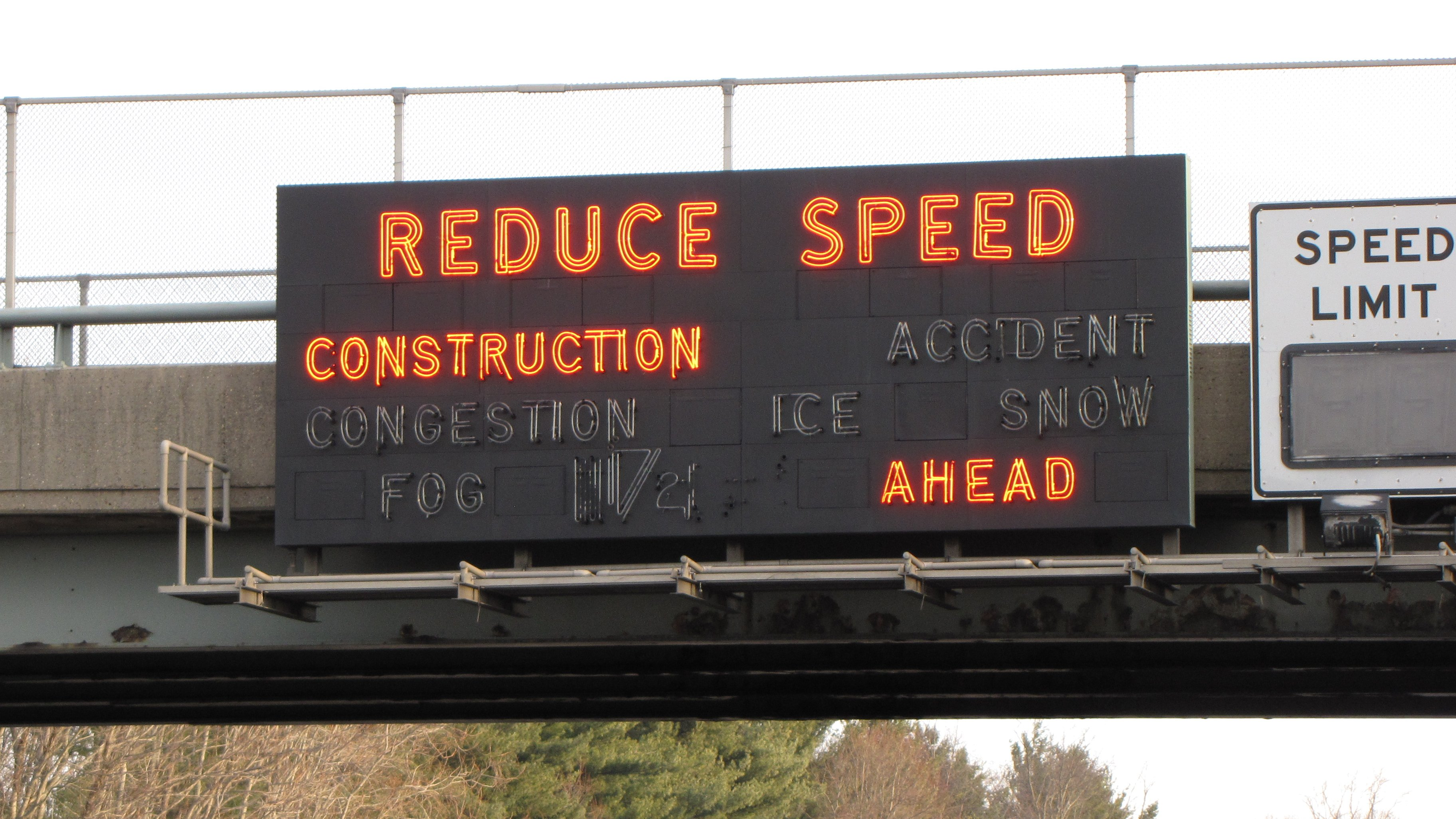
Early style of VMS on the New Jersey Turnpike using neon tubes, since replaced by new LED VMS signs. It is next to a vane variable speed-limit sign

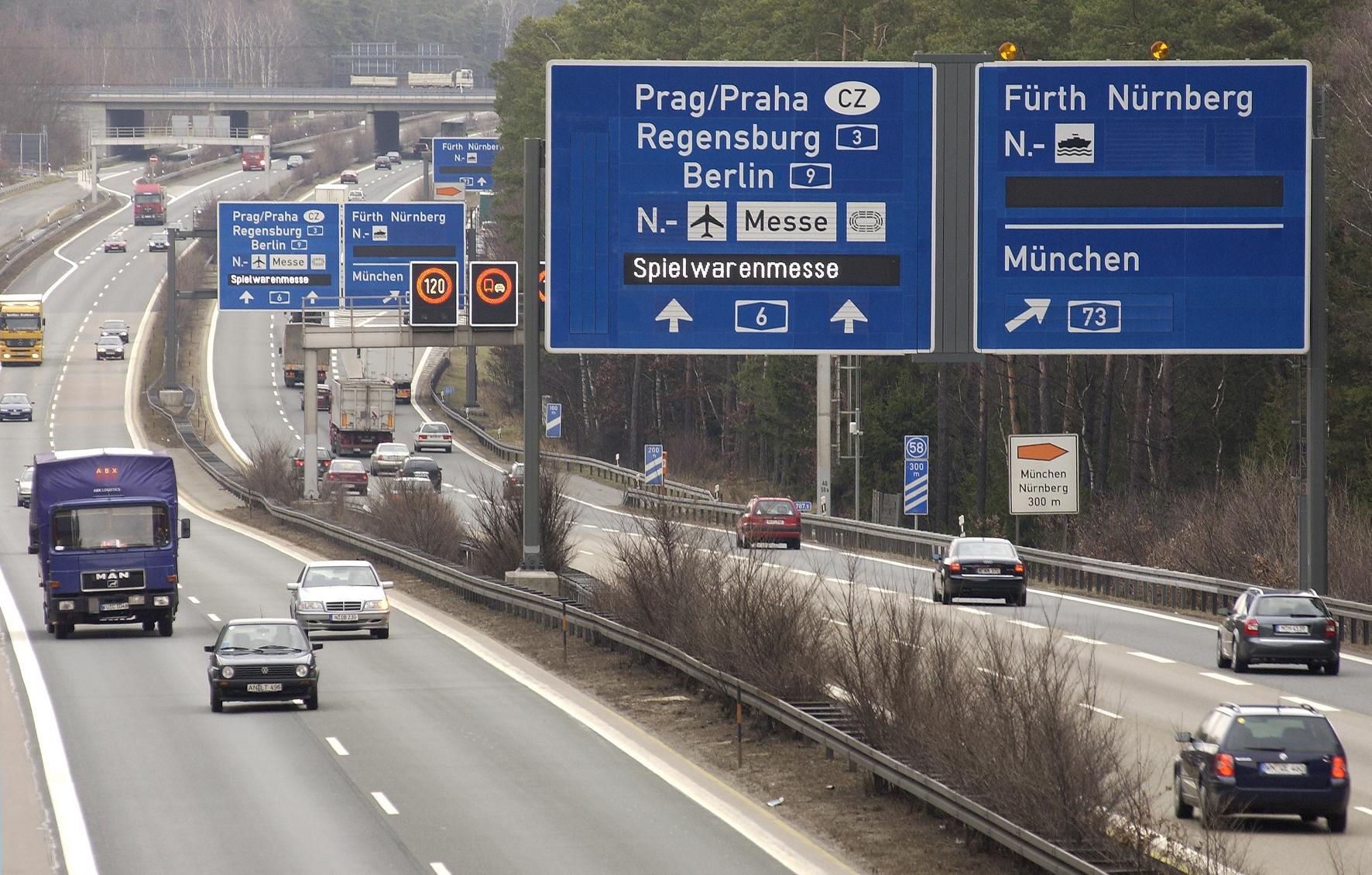
Europe's largest Dynamic Route Guidance System Nuremberg, Germany

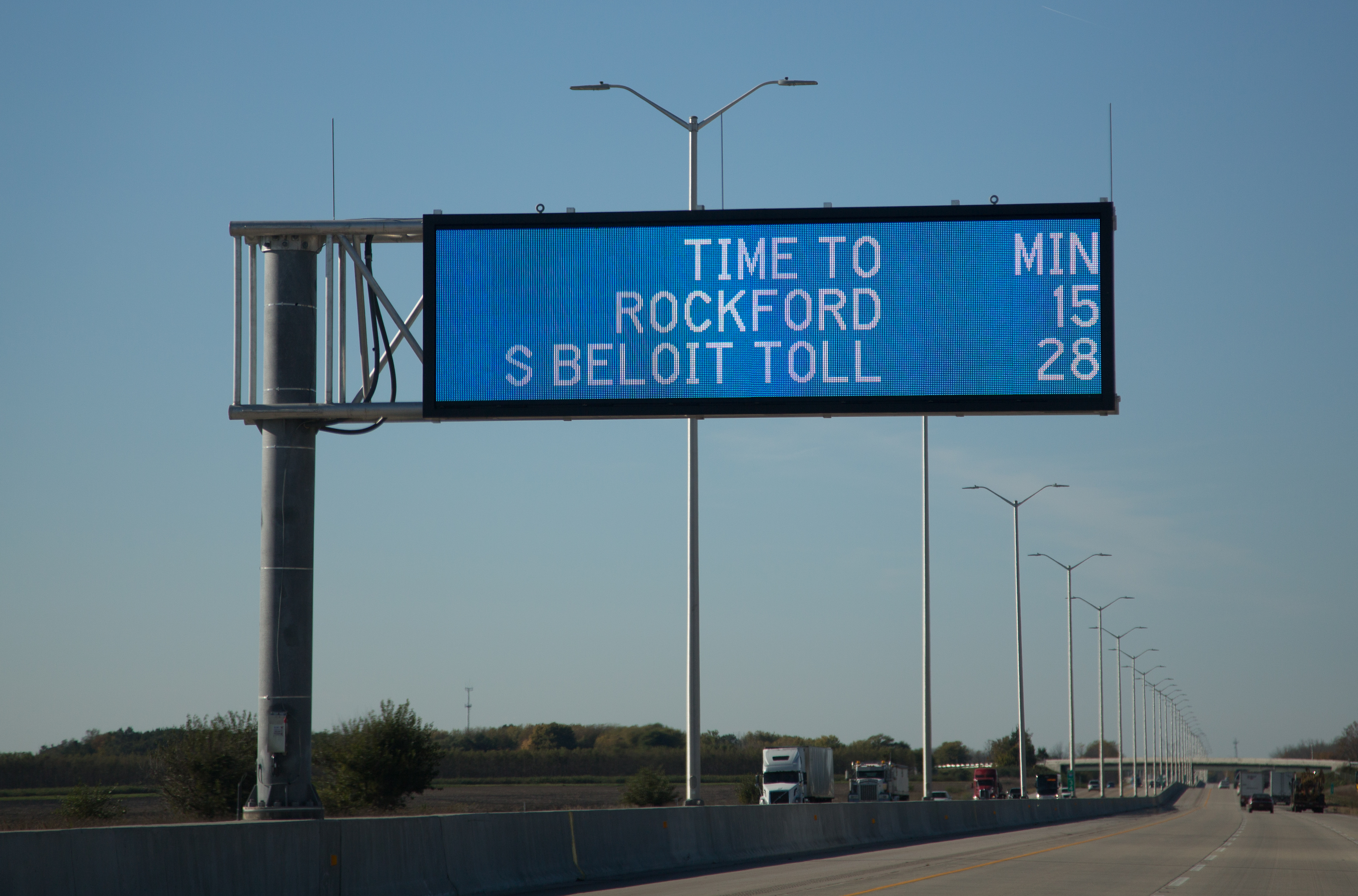
LED sign over I-90 (Jane Addams Memorial Tollway) in Riley Township, Illinois, showing remaining travel times

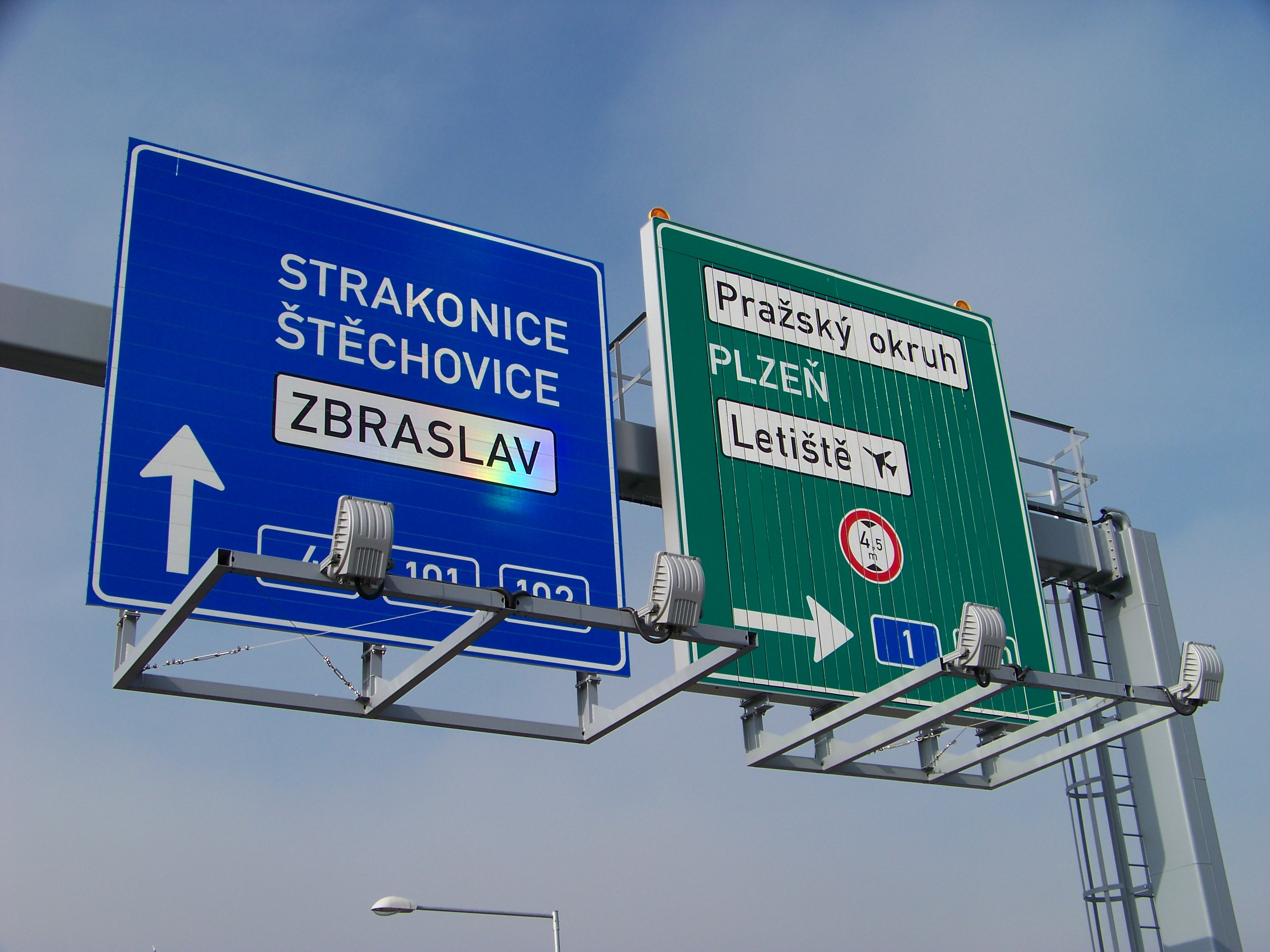
Mechanical variable-message sign (right) on the Prague Ringway, Czech Republic; made by Značky Praha s.r.o.

A variable- (also changeable-, electronic-, or dynamic-) message sign or message board, often abbreviated VMS, VMB, CMS, or DMS, and in the UK known as a matrix sign, is an electronic traffic sign often used on roadways to give travelers information about special events. Such signs warn of traffic congestion, accidents, incidents such as terrorist attacks, Amber/Silver/Blue Alerts, roadwork zones, or speed limits on a specific highway segment. In urban areas, VMS are used within parking guidance and information systems to guide drivers to available car parking spaces. They may also ask vehicles to take alternative routes, limit travel speed, warn of duration and location of the incidents, inform of the traffic conditions, or display general public safety messages.

== History ==
VMS systems were deployed at least as early as the 1950s on the New Jersey Turnpike. The road's signs of that period, and up to around 2012, were capable of displaying a few messages in neon, all oriented around warning drivers to slow down: "REDUCE SPEED", followed by a warning of either construction, accident, congestion, ice, snow, or fog at a certain distance ahead. The New Jersey Turnpike Authority replaced those signs (along with 1990s-vintage dot-matrix VMS systems along the Garden State Parkway) with more flexible electronic signs between 2010 and 2016.

The current VMS systems are largely deployed on freeways, trunk highways, or in work zones.

On the interchange of I-5 and SR 120 in San Joaquin County, California, an automated visibility and speed warning system was installed in 1996 to warn traffic of reduced visibility due to fog (where tule fog is a common problem in the winter), and of slow or stopped traffic.

Message Signs were deployed in Ontario during the 1990s and are now being upgraded on 400-series highways as well as two pilot secondary highways in northeastern Ontario.

== Technologies and types ==
Early variable message signs included static signs with words that would illuminate (often using neon tubing) indicating the type of incident that occurred, or signs that used rotating prisms (trilons) to change the message being displayed. These were later replaced by dot matrix displays typically using eggcrate, fiber optic, or flip-disc technology, which were capable of displaying a much wider range of messages than earlier static variable message signs. Since the late 1990s, the most common technology used in new installations for variable message signs are LED displays. In recent years, some newer LED variable message signs have the ability to display colored text and graphics.

Dot-matrix variable message signs are divided into three subgroups: character matrix, row matrix, and full matrix. In a character matrix VMS, each character is given its own matrix with equal horizontal spacing between them, typically with two or three rows of characters. In a full matrix VMS, the entire sign is a single large dot matrix display, allowing the display of different fonts and graphics. A row matrix VMS is a hybrid of the two types, divided into two or three rows like a character matrix display, except each row is a single long dot matrix display instead of being split per character horizontally.

Overhead variable message signs are today available in three form factors: front access, rear access, and walk-in. In a front access variable message sign, maintenance is performed by lifting the sign open from the front. Most smaller VMS are of the front access form factor, and are typically installed today on major arterials. The rear access form factor is similar to the front access form factor, except that maintenance is performed from the rear of the sign, and are commonly used for medium-sized dynamic message signs installed along the roadside of freeways (instead of overhead). The walk-in form factor is a more recent introduction, where maintenance on the sign is performed from the inside of the sign. A key advantage of the walk-in form factor is that lane closures are generally not required to perform maintenance on the sign. Most of the largest VMS units installed today are walk-in units, and are typically installed overhead on freeways.

The New Jersey Turnpike Authority counts five unique types of variable message signs under its jurisdiction, at least one of which has been replaced by newer signs. They are:

1. "REDUCE SPEED" neon signs (1950s-2010, obsolete, have now been replaced).
2. "Changeable message signs" (trilon/ rotating-drum signs that can be used for closing roads or moving traffic to other roadways).
3. Electronic VMS: signs with remotely controlled messages displayed on them; the messages are sent from the State Traffic Management Center, updating the signs automatically.
4. Variable speed limit signs - used for varying the posted speed limits within work zones and in emergencies.
5. Portable VMS: movable "electronic VMS". A portable VMS has much the same characteristics as a fixed electronic VMS, but can be moved from location to location as the need dictates.

== Usage ==
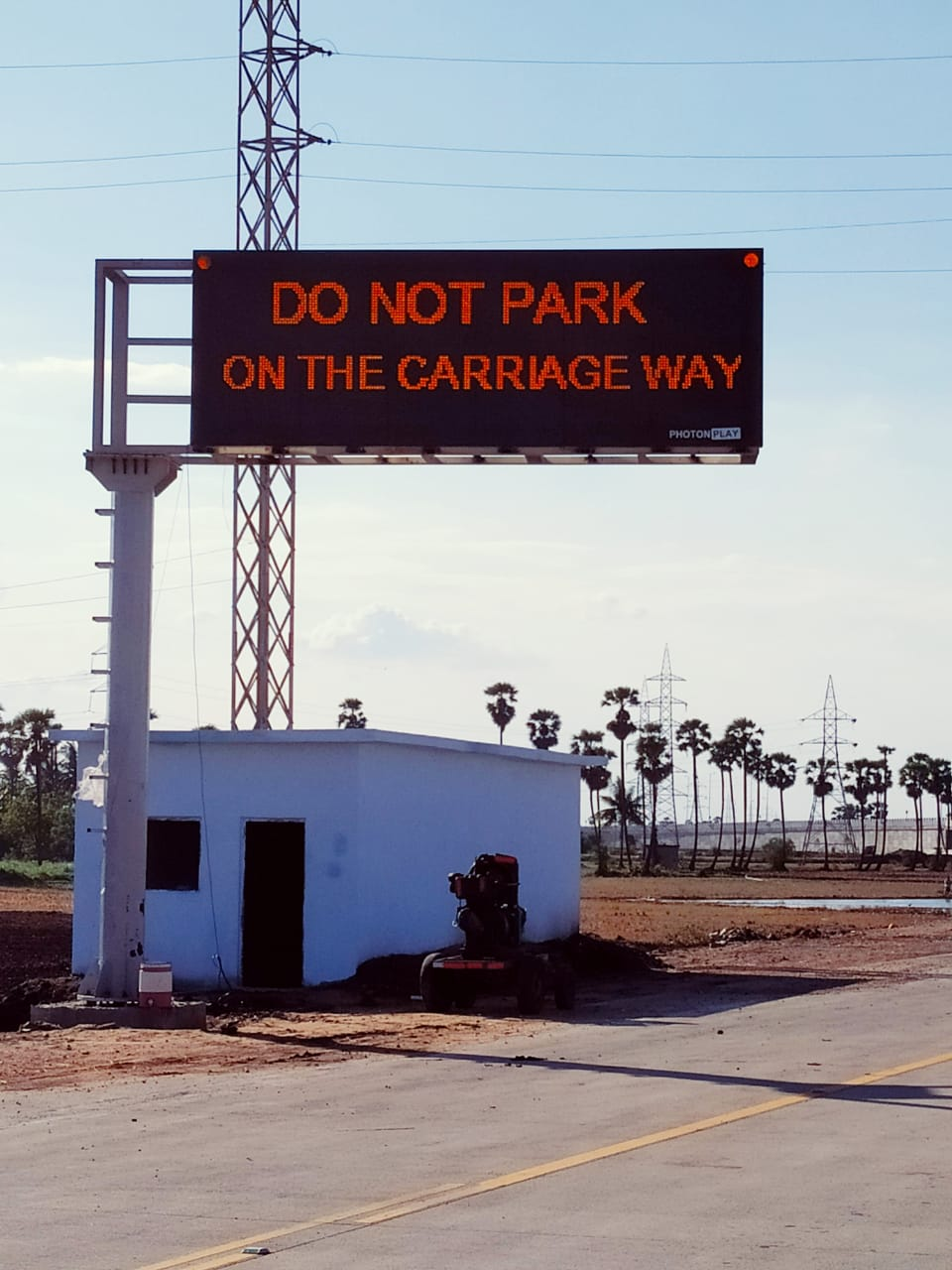
A variable-message sign.

Early models required an operator to be physically present when programming a message, whereas newer models may be reprogrammed remotely via a wired or wireless network or cellphone connection.

A complete message on a panel generally includes a problem statement indicating incident, roadwork, stalled vehicle etc.; a location statement indicating where the incident is located; an effect statement indicating lane closure, delay, etc. and an action statement giving suggestion what to do traffic conditions ahead. These signs are also used for Amber alert messages, and in some states, Silver and Blue Alert messages.

In some places, VMSes are set up with permanent, semi-static displays indicating predicted travel times to important traffic destinations such as major cities or interchanges along the route of a highway.

Typical messages provide the following information:

- Promotional messages about services provided by a road authority during non-critical hours, such as carpooling efforts, travelers' information stations and 5-1-1 lines
- Crashes, including vehicle spin-out or rollover
- Road Works
- Incidents affecting normal traffic flow in a lane or on shoulders
- Non-recurring congestion, often a residual effect of cleared crash
- Closures of an entire road, e.g. over a mountain pass in winter.
- Exit ramp closures
- Debris on roadway
- Vehicle fires
- Wildfires
- Short-term maintenance or construction lasting less than three days
- Pavement failure alerts
- AMBER, Silver, and Blue Alerts, as well as weather warnings via the warning infrastructure of NOAA Weather Radio's SAME system
- Travel times
- Variable speed limits
- Car park occupancy levels
- speed sign, for recommending a speed to approach the next traffic light in its green phase.

The information comes from a variety of traffic monitoring and surveillance systems. It is expected that by providing real-time information on special events on the oncoming road, VMS can improve motorists' route selection, reduce travel time, mitigate the severity and duration of incidents and improve the performance of the transportation network.

=== United Kingdom ===
Examples of variable message signs in the UK

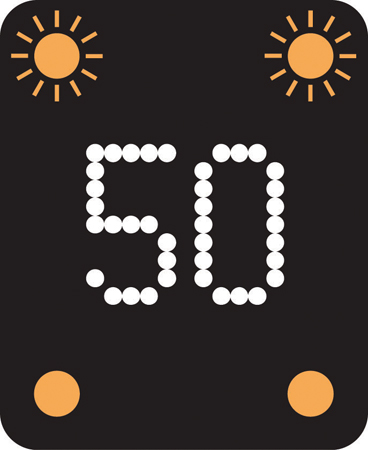
Temporary advisory speed limit of 50 mph.

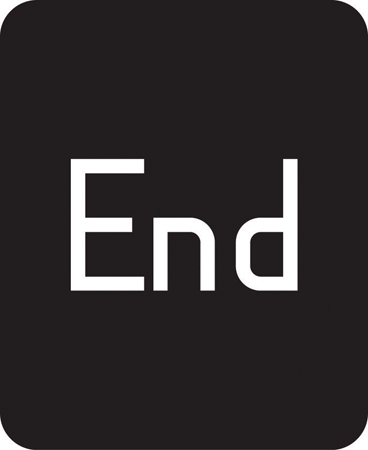
End of temporary restrictions.

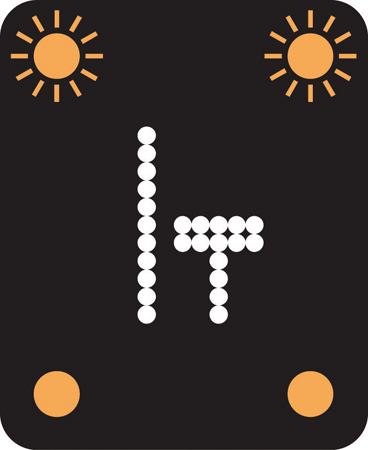
Lane 2 is closed ahead.

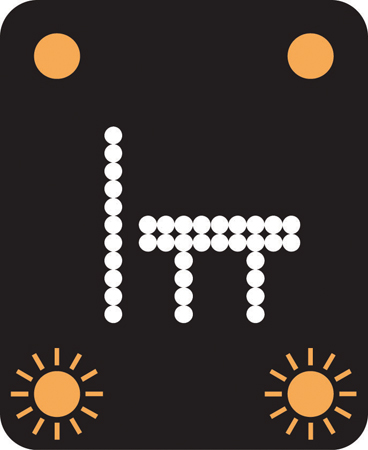
Lane 2 and 3 are closed ahead.

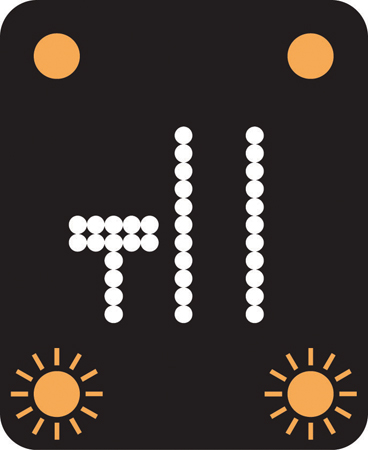
Lane 1 is closed ahead.

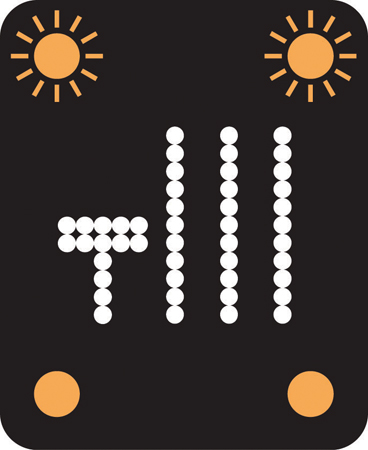
Lane 1 is closed ahead.

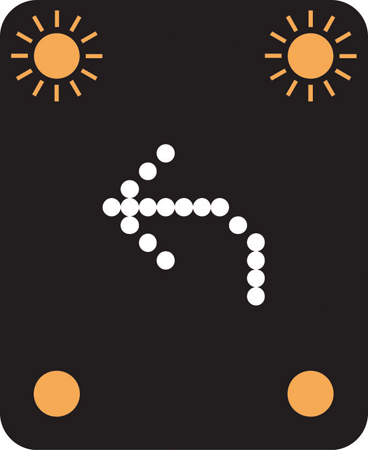
Leave the motorway at the next junction.

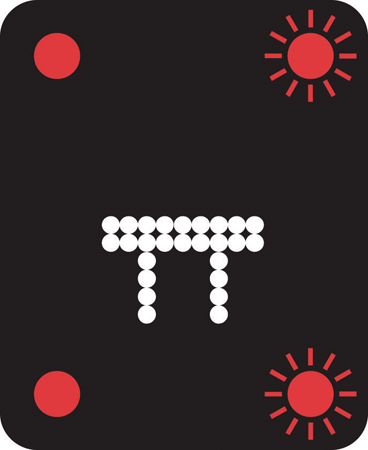
Both lanes are closed.*

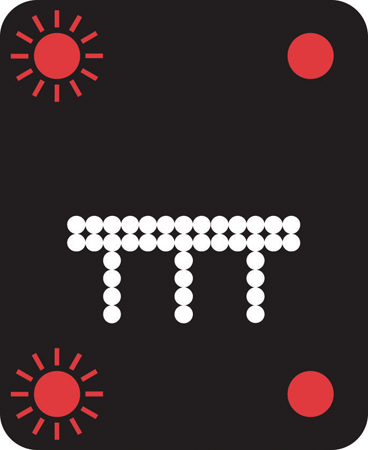
All three lanes are closed.*

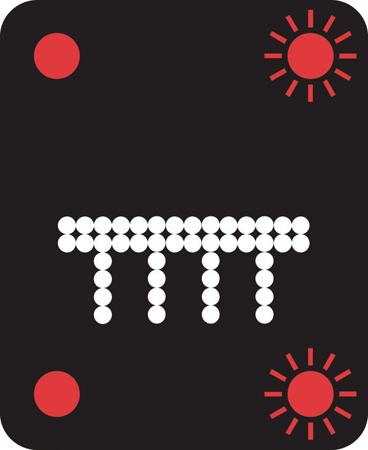
All 4 lanes are closed.*

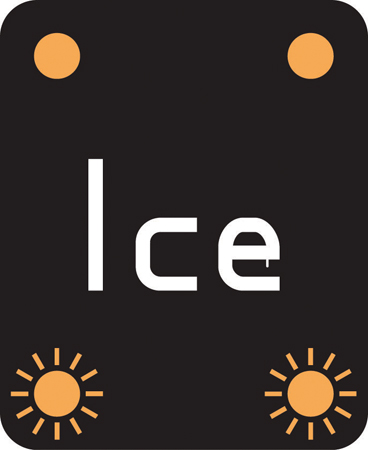
Risk of ice ahead.

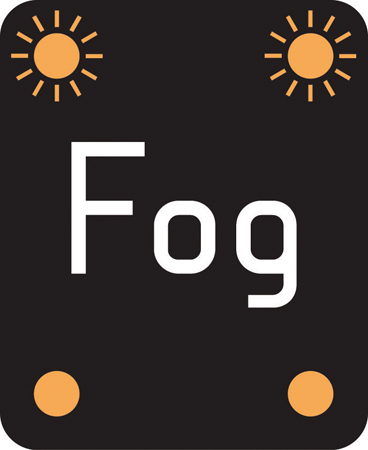
Risk of Fog ahead

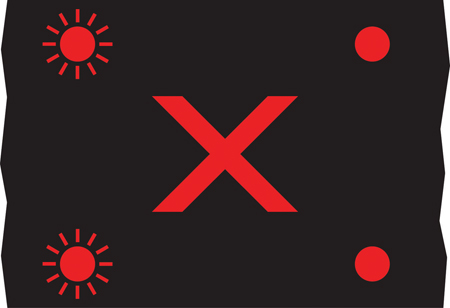
Do not use the lane below the signal.

* Do not enter the motorway when the red lamps are flashing in pairs from side to side.

On 27 March 1972, the first motorway computer-controlled warning lights in the UK, with 59 miles on the M6 from Broughton, Lancashire to Barthomley, on the Cheshire boundary, and 26 miles on the M62 east of Whitefield, was switched on by Michael Heseltine and Charles Legh Shuldham Cornwall-Legh, 5th Baron Grey of Codnor at the headquarters of Cheshire Constabulary on Nuns Road.

It was centred at a police computer centre at Westhoughton, that connected to police stations in Preston and Chester. The Chester site was soon be connected to the M53 and M57. Four other regional computer centres would be opened at Perry Barr near the M6, Scratchwood near the M1, at Hook near the M3, and at Almondsbury near the M4. Most British motorways would be covered by 1975. The system was designed by GEC and had taken five years to design.

== Safety messages for drivers ==
Increasingly, signs have been used to remind drivers to buckle seat belts ("Click It or Ticket"), obey the speed limit, and stay off the road if impaired ("Drive sober or get pulled over"). In a federal study, a slight majority of drivers reported that public safety messages on dynamic message signs impacted their driving behaviors.

The Ohio Department of Transportation began using humorous dynamic message signs in 2015, perplexing some drivers. Examples of humorous signs seen in New Jersey, Arizona, Texas, Pennsylvania, Delaware, Iowa, New York, Minnesota and Ohio include:

- "Hold on to your butts. Help prevent forest fires."
- "We'll be blunt. Don't drive high."
- "Visiting in-laws? Slow down, get there late."
- "Only sparklers should be lit." and “Don’t drive Star Spangled hammered." (for Fourth of July)
- "Hocus pocus – drive with focus." and "Slow down in work zones - my mummy works here." (for Halloween)
- "Drive Drunk and YULE be sorry." and “You’re not a Christmas tree. Don’t drive lit."
- "HO HO HO, please drive slow." and "Don't be a grinch, let them merge."
- "Reckless drivers are worse than fruitcake."
- "Only Rudolph should be lit." and "Santa's watching, put down the phone."
- “I’m just a sign asking drivers to use turn signals.”
- “Seatbelts always pass a vibe check.”
- “Come on, Eileen… your speed is obscene."
- “May the 4th be with you, text I will not.”
- "Irish you would slow down."
- "I saw the sign and it opened up my eyes."
- "Nice car, did it come with a turn signal?" and "Get your head out of your apps."
- "100 is the temperature - not the speed limit."
- “Let’s go Barbie, Buckle Up. Yes. You Ken!” and “Fast & Furious? Nope! Slow & Cautious.”

In 2024, concerns that these kinds of messages were distracting drivers led the Federal Highway Administration to strongly discourage the use of signs with "obscure meanings, references to pop culture" or humor. The 2025 update on the Vienna Convention on Road Signs and Signals strictly bans all humorous and witty messages on signs for failing translatability test.

== Movable versions ==
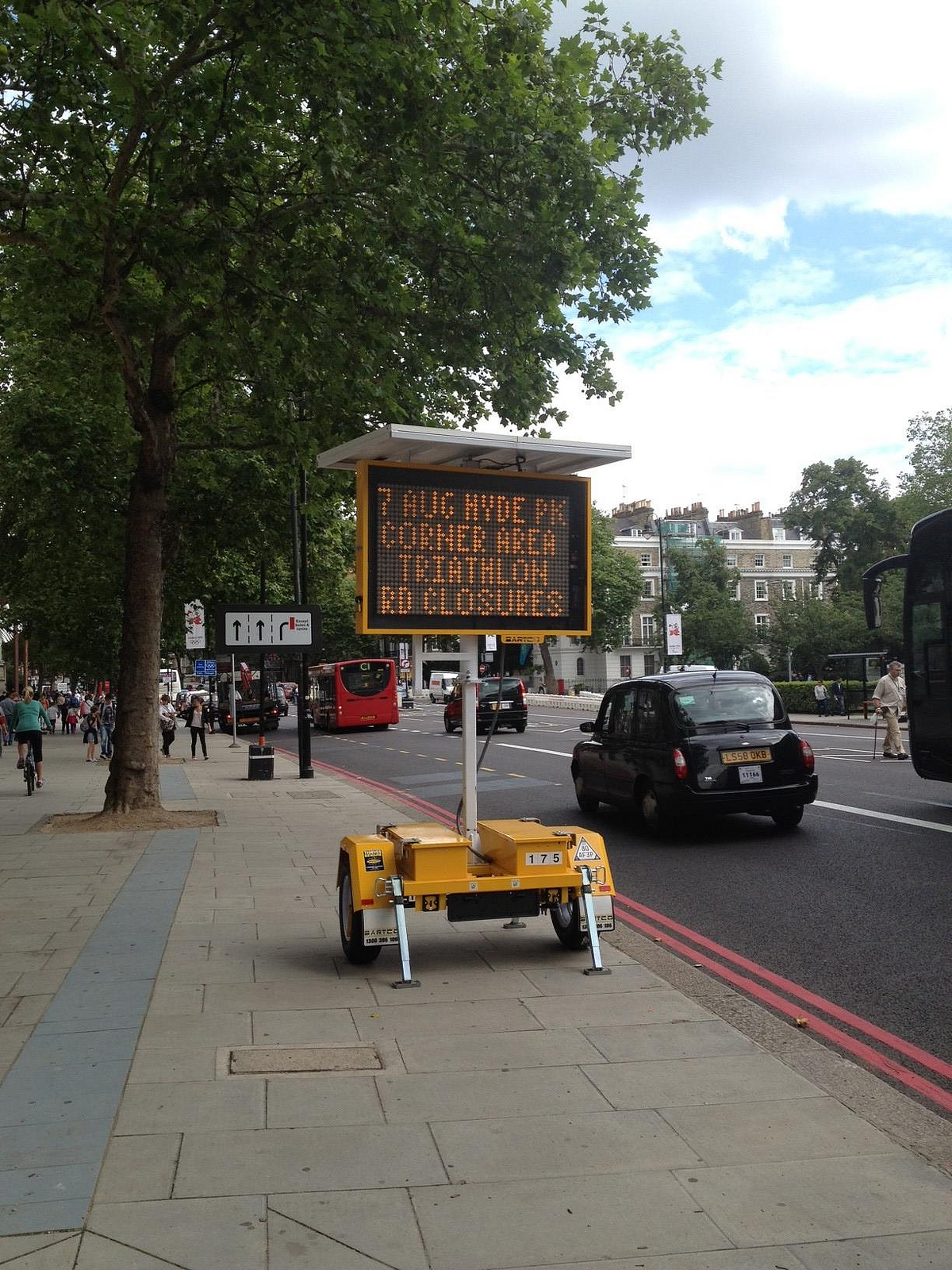
Trailer-mounted VMS in central London, England

Truck-mounted VMSes (also called Portable Changeable Message Signs or PCMS) are sometimes dispatched by highway agencies such as Caltrans to warn traffic of incidents such as accidents in areas where permanent VMSes are not available or near enough as a preventive measure for reducing secondary accidents. They are often deployed in pairs so that the second VMS truck can take over when the traffic queue overtakes the first truck, requiring the first truck to reposition further upstream from the queue, to be effective. An optional third truck, the team leader, may be utilized for driving by and monitoring the incident itself, traffic patterns and delay times, to make strategic decisions for minimizing delays—analogous to spotter planes used in fighting forest fires.

Trailer-mounted variable-message signs are used to alter traffic patterns near work zones, and for traffic management for special events, natural disasters, and other temporary traffic patterns. The messages displayed on the sign can be programmed locally on the unit's control panel, or units equipped with a cellular modem can be programmed remotely via computer or phone. Most manufacturers produce trailers which comply with the National Transportation Communications for Intelligent Transportation System Protocol (NTCIP) which allows the portable trailer to be integrated with an intelligent transportation system. Trailer-mounted VMS can be equipped with radar, cameras, and other sensing devices as part of a smart work zone deployment.

== In popular culture ==
A variable-message sign figures significantly into the plot of the 1991 film L.A. Story.

== Gallery ==
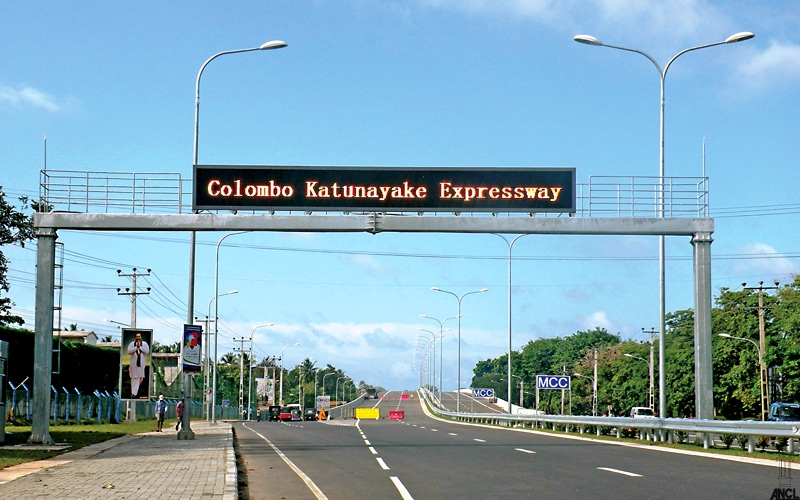
A single row matrix LED sign on Katunayake Expressway in Colombo, Sri Lanka

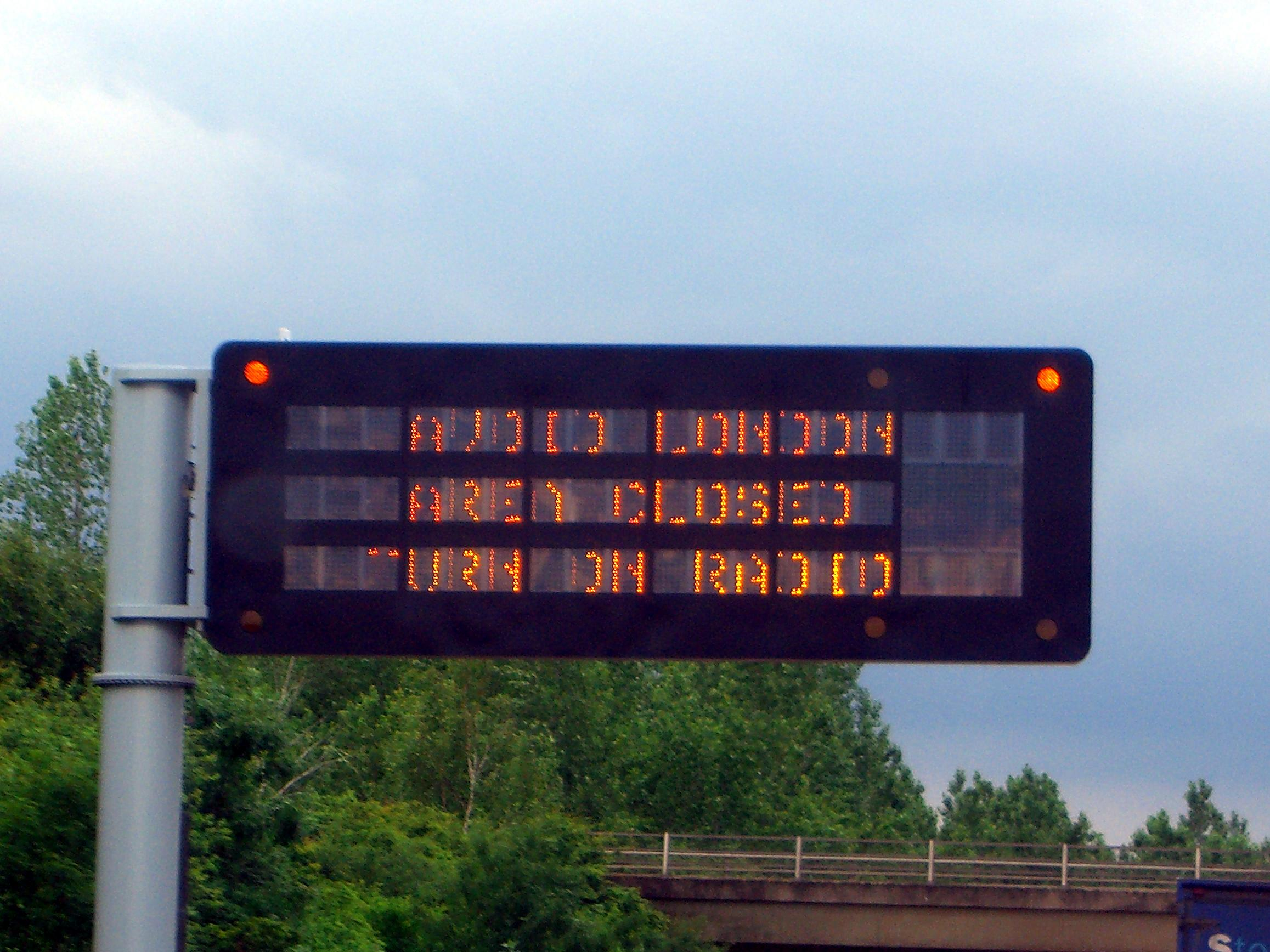
A three row fixed character matrix LED sign warns "Avoid London - Area Closed - Turn On Radio" following the 7 July 2005 London bombings

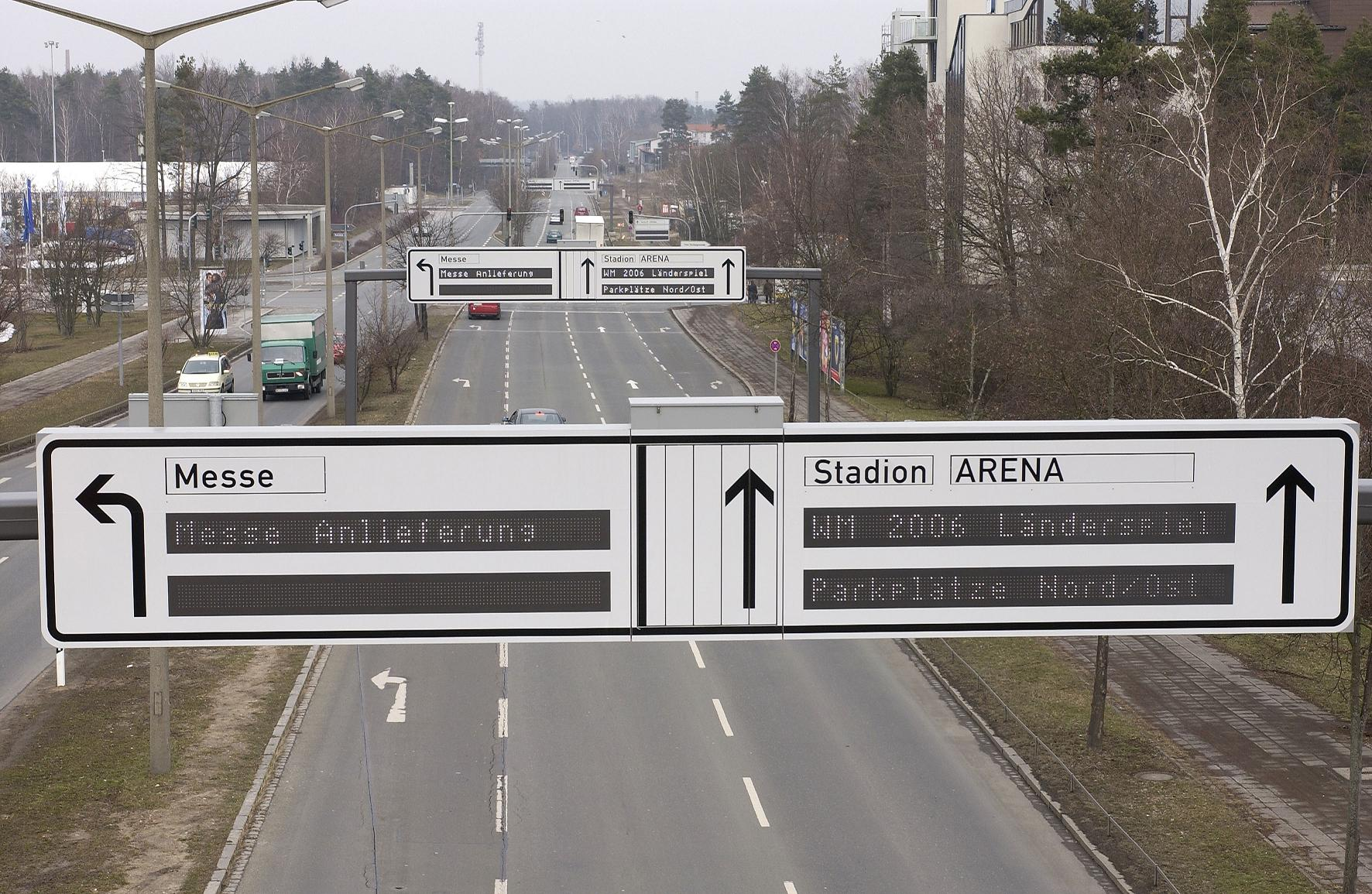
Europe's largest Dynamic Route Guidance System, in Nuremberg, Germany (hybrid rotating prism and row matrix LED)

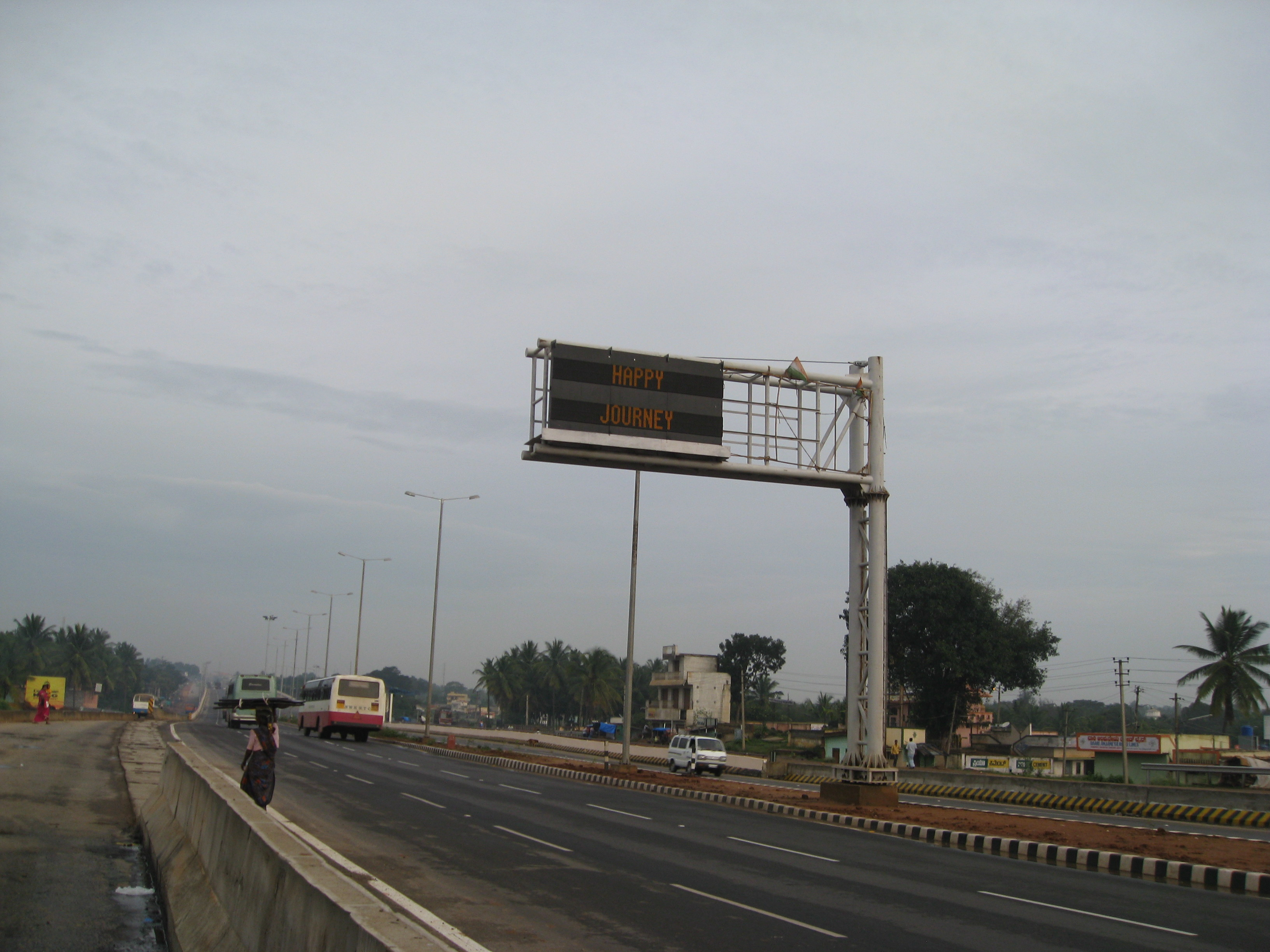
A dual row matrix LED sign on National Highway 4, in Bangalore, India

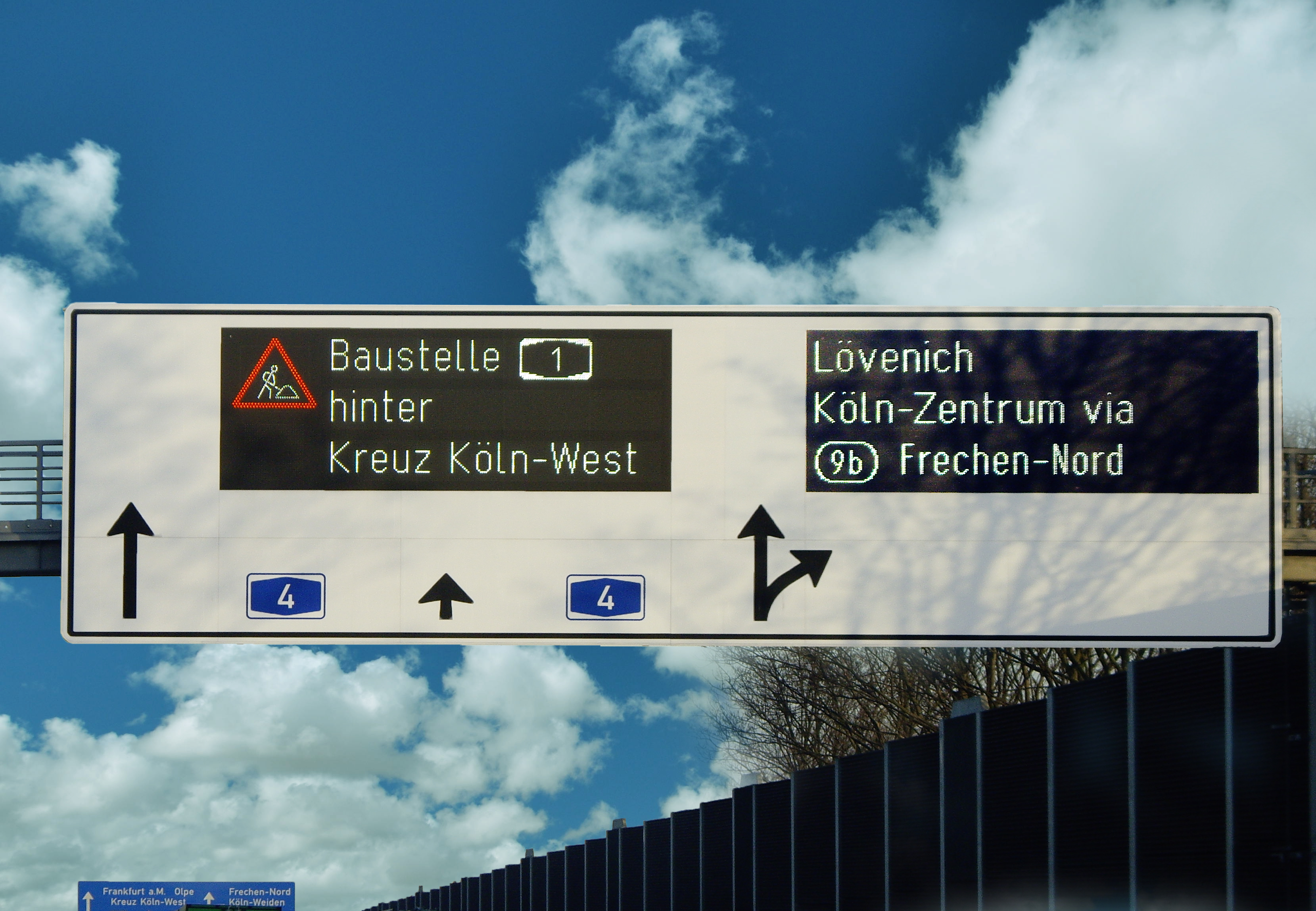
A row matrix LED sign on an interchange of a German Autobahn with side graphics display.

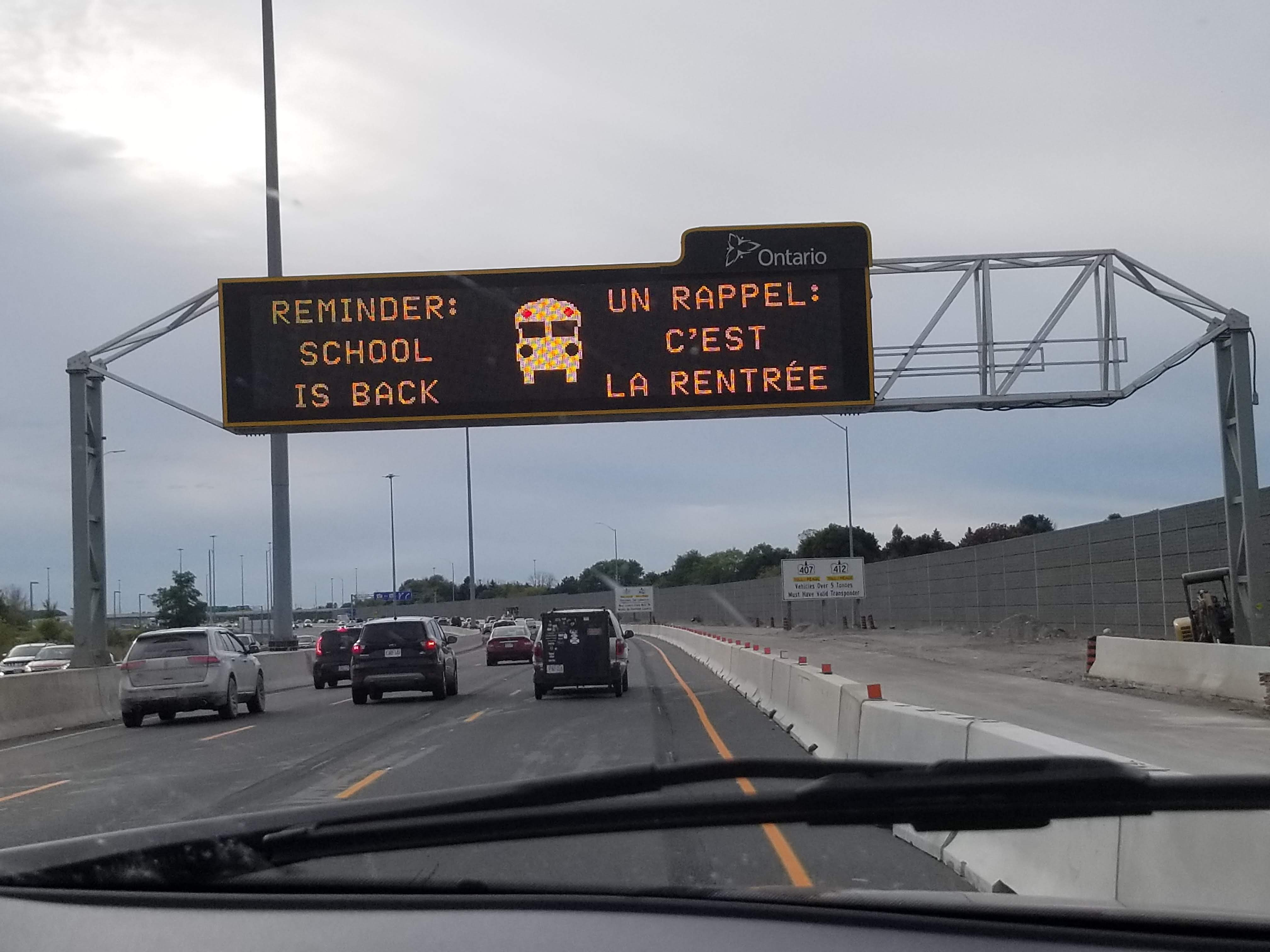
A full matrix sign on Highway 401 in Ontario, Canada.

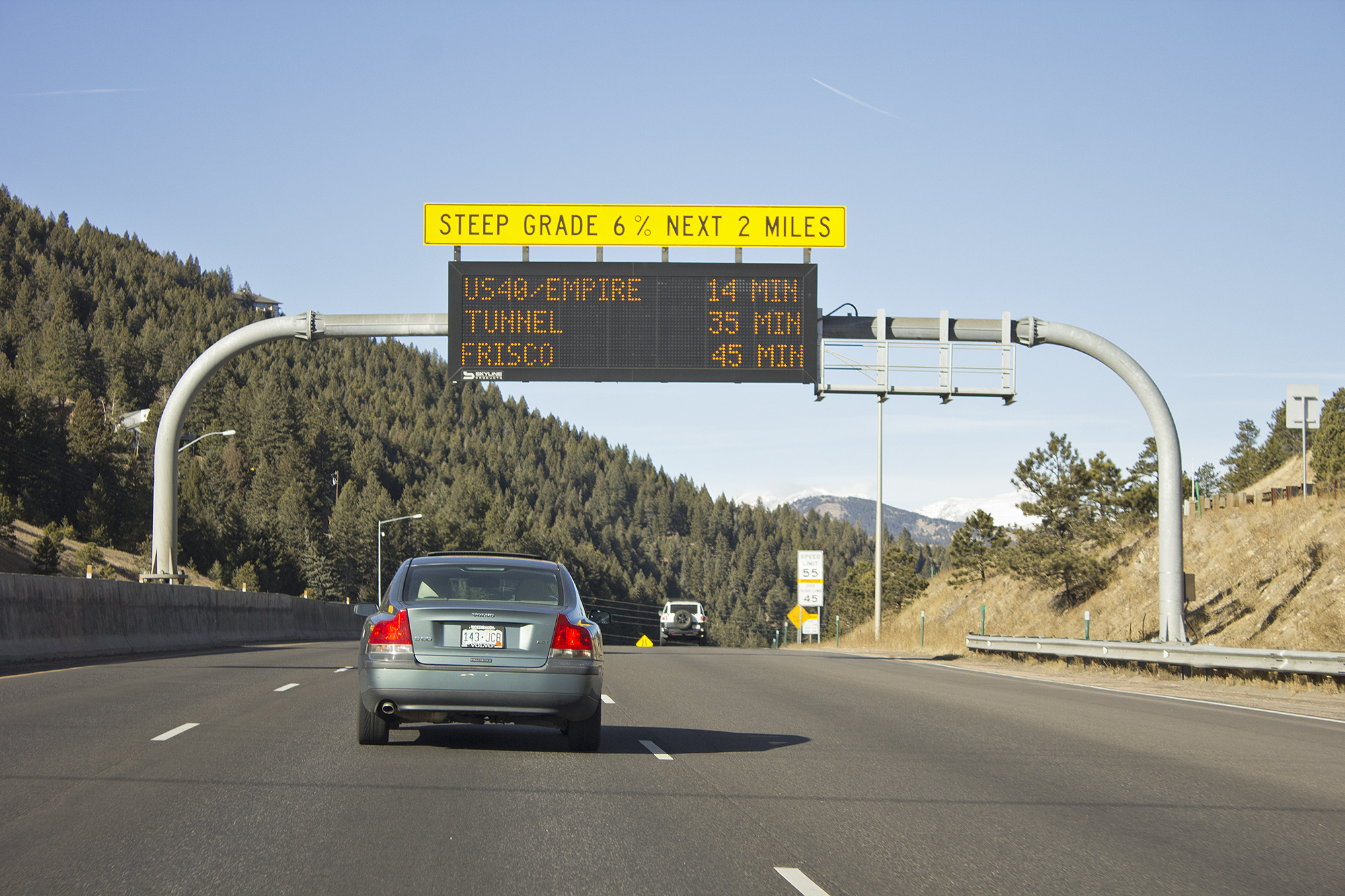
A full matrix walk-in cabinet LED sign (manufactured by Skyline Products) displaying travel times on Interstate 70 north of Evergreen, Colorado, USA.

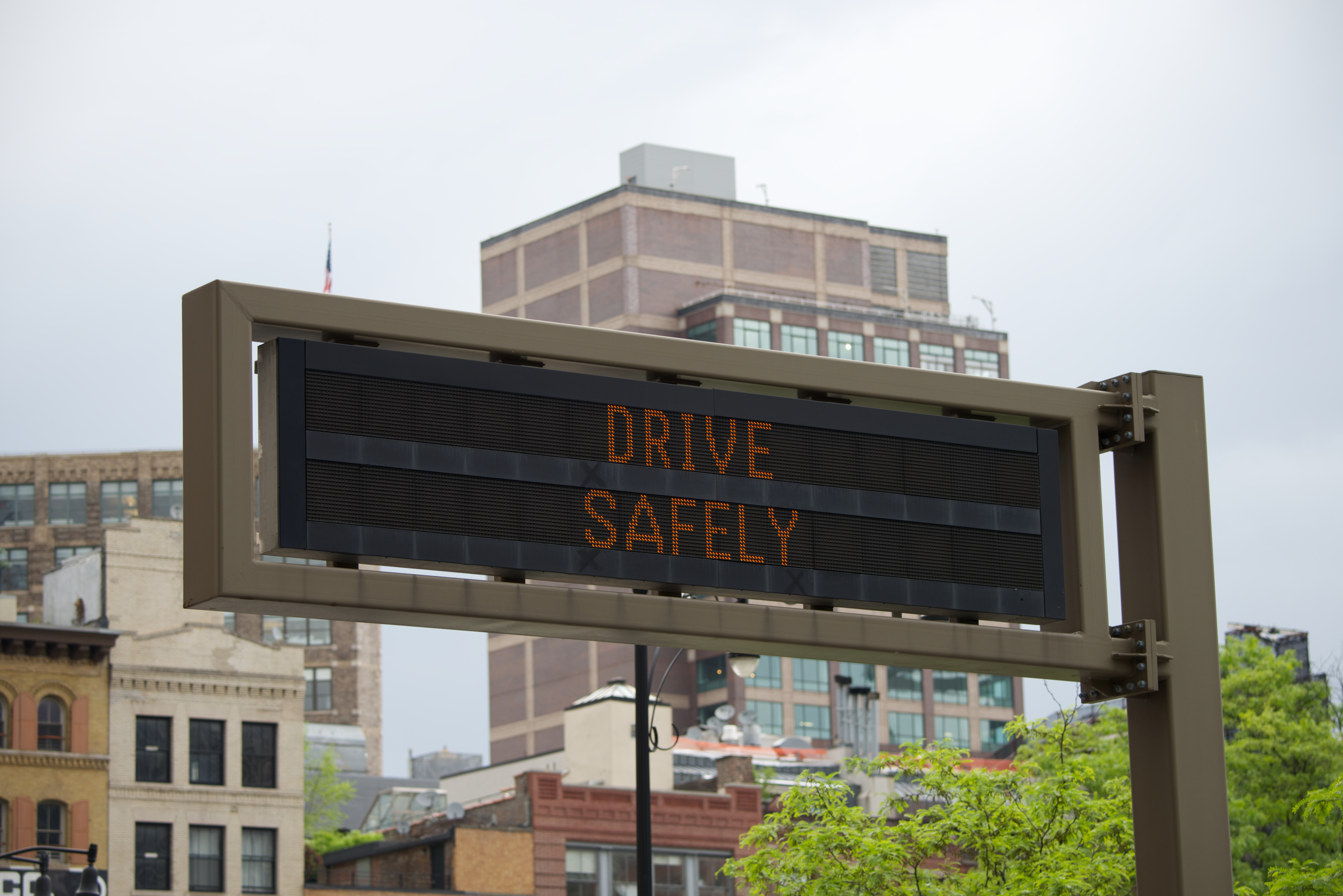
A dual row matrix LED sign in Manhattan reminding motorists to drive safely.

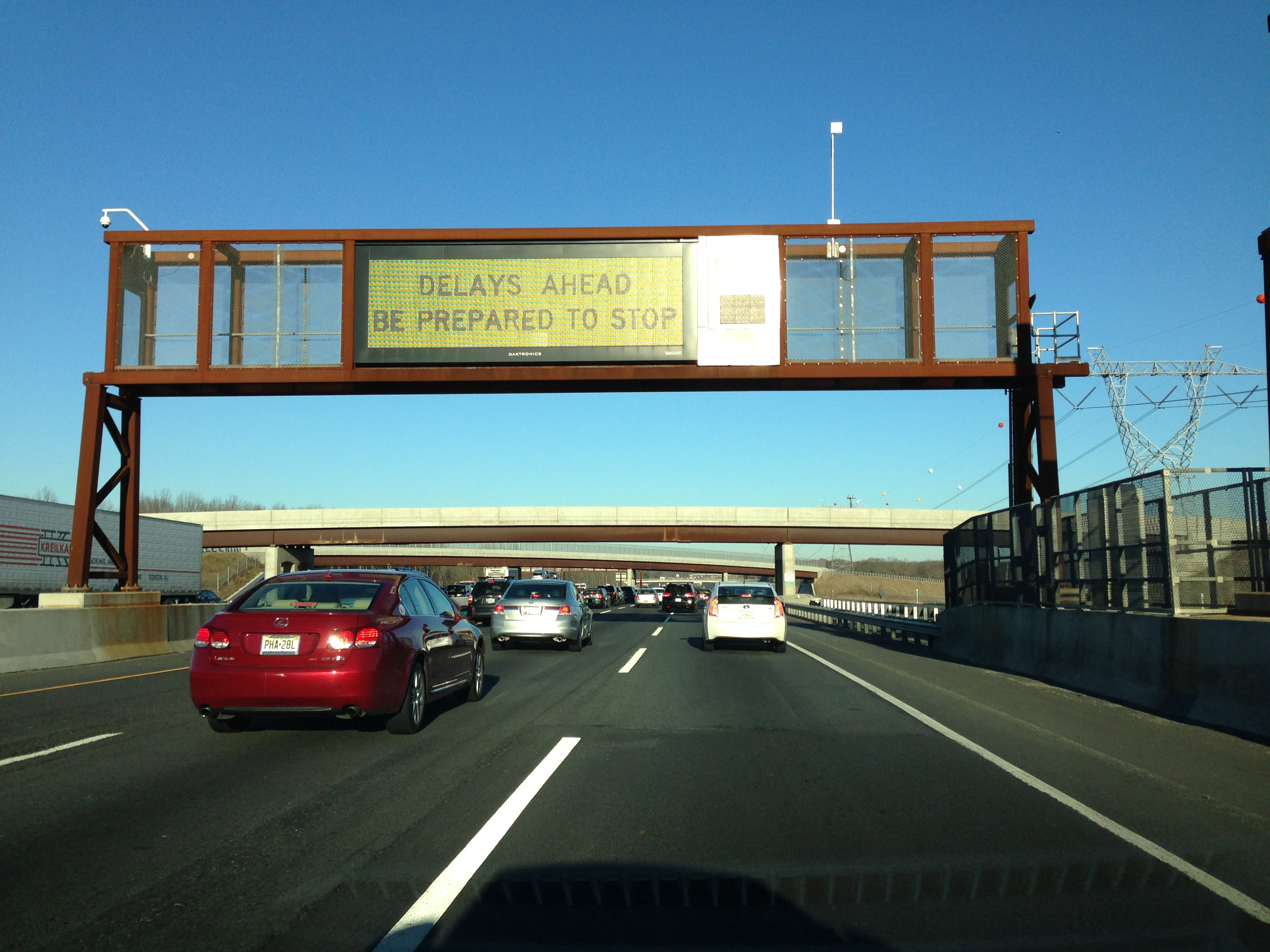
A Daktronics rear access color LED sign on the New Jersey Turnpike, USA, displaying a warning about congestion ahead.

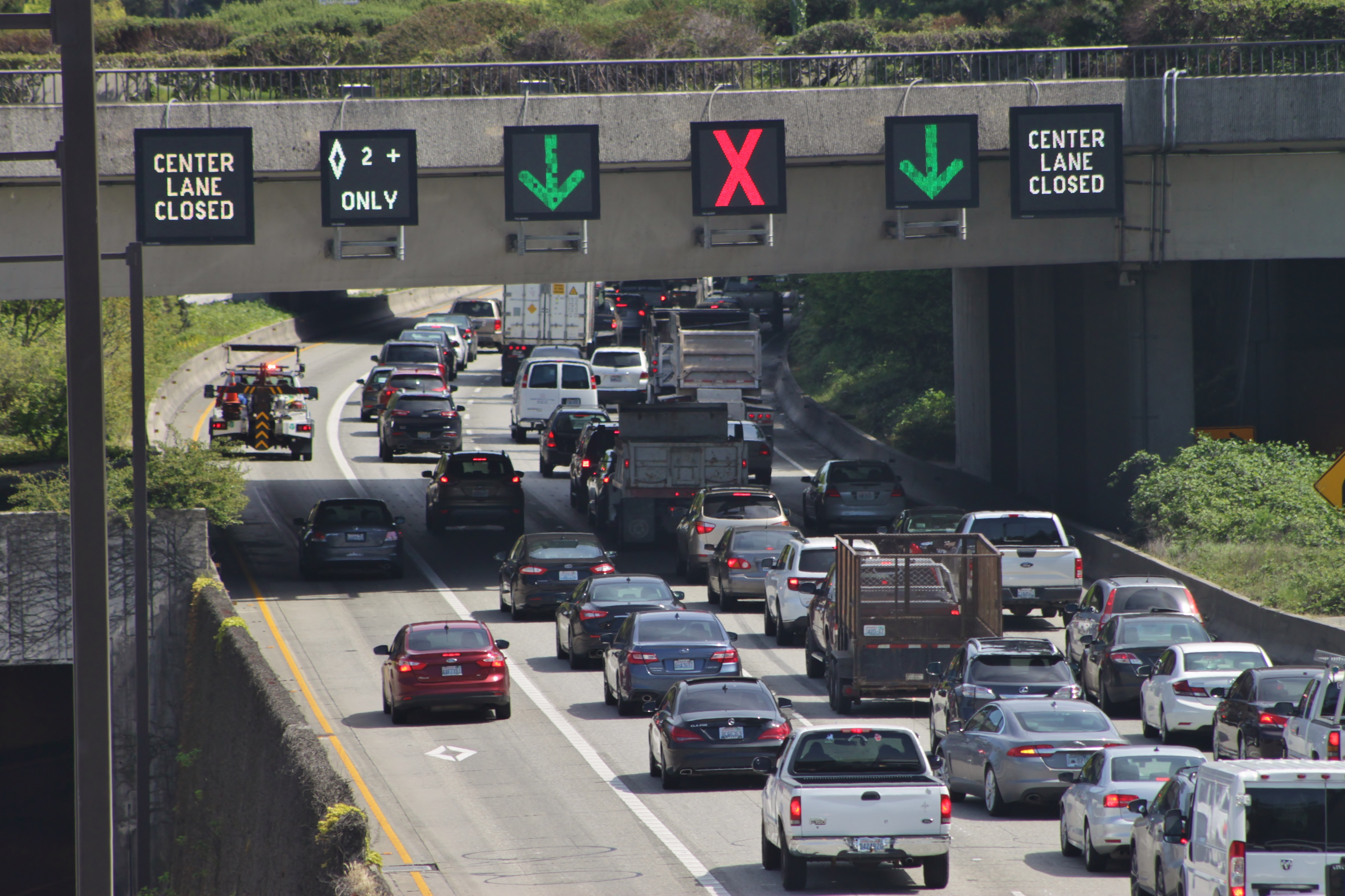
A set of LED signs on Interstate 90 in Mercer Island, Washington, USA, that warn of an upcoming lane closure due to a collision. Normally, these signs display variable speed limits that are adjusted during rush hour.

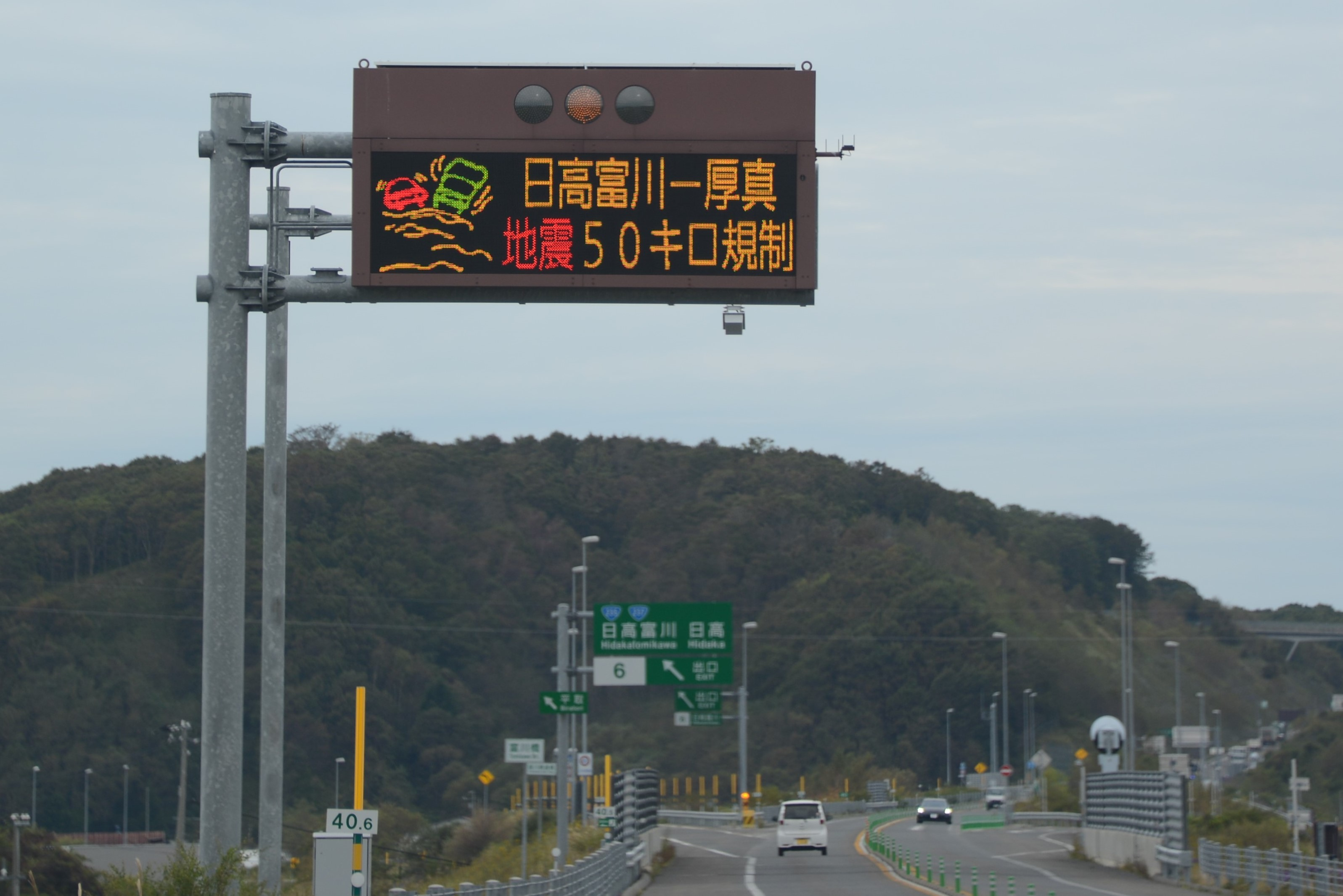
A variable-message sign tells drivers that a section of the Hidaka Expressway in Hokkaido, Japan is damaged after the 2018 Hokkaido Eastern Iburi earthquake.

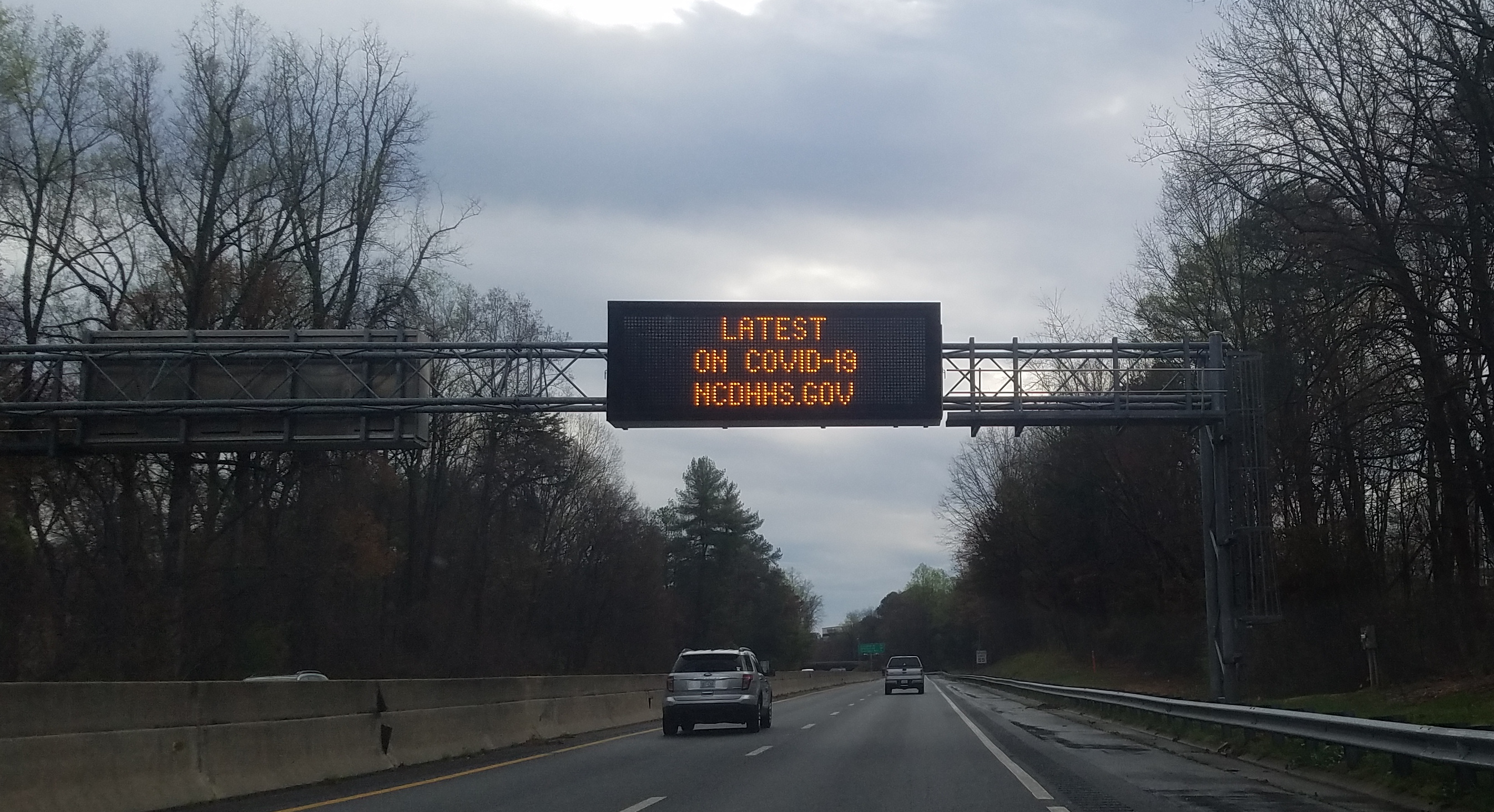
A sign in Winston-Salem, North Carolina, USA, displaying the website for information on COVID-19 in North Carolina.

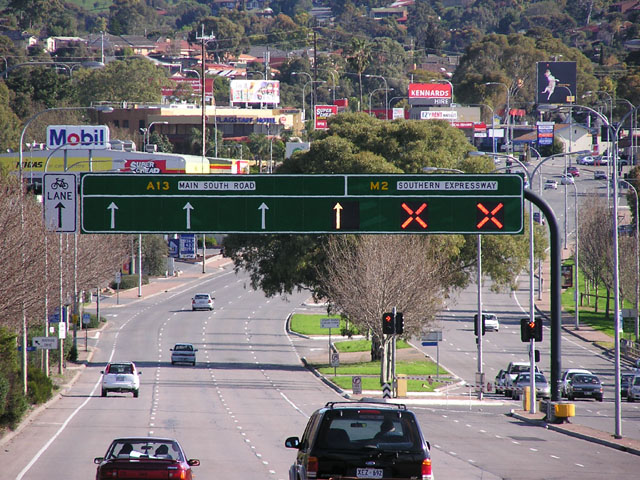
Main South Road at the northern end of the Southern Expressway, Adelaide, Australia, during morning peak (looking south), closed to southbound traffic. This has now changed.

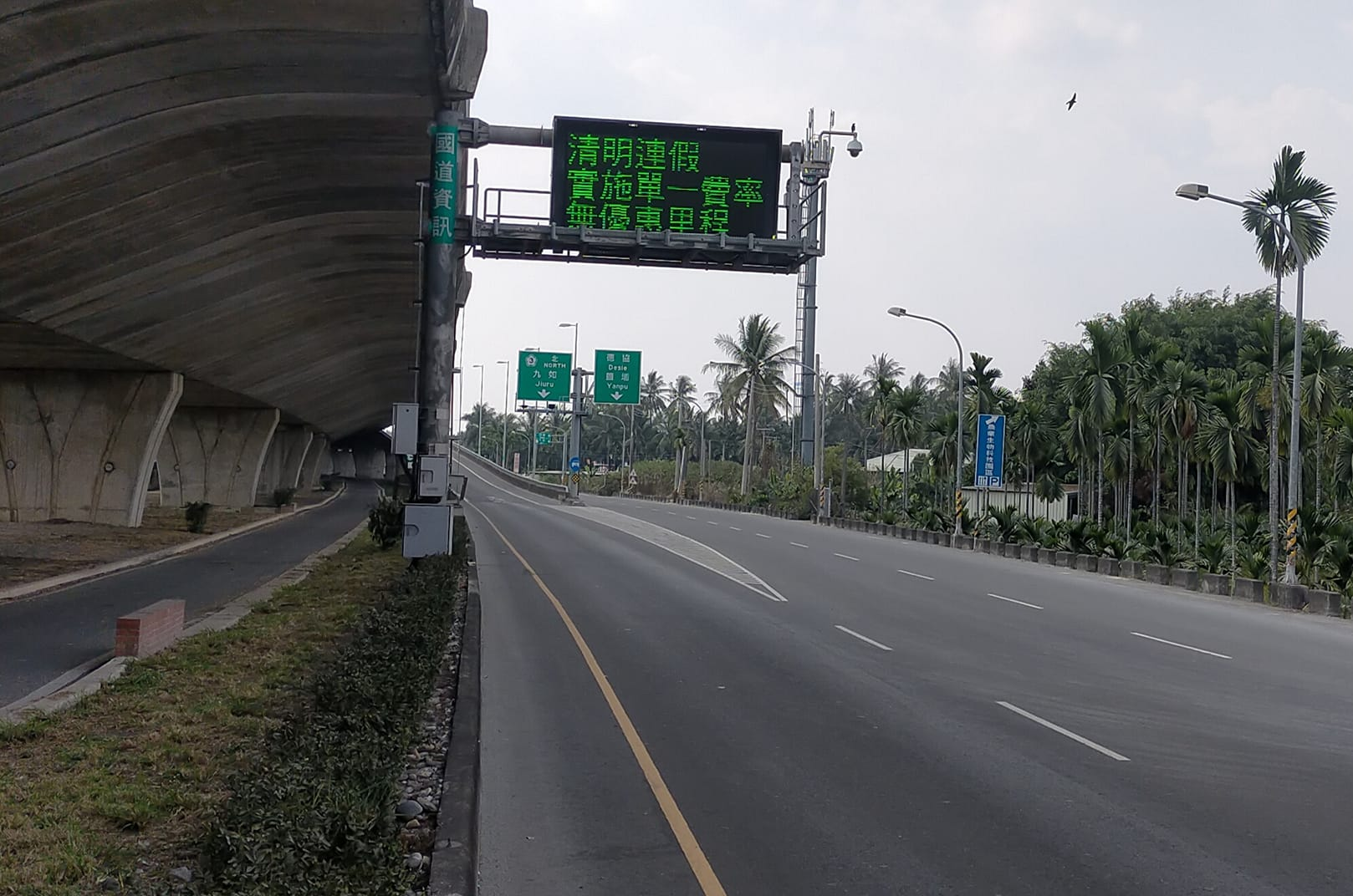
Variable message sign at the Changzhi Interchange in Taiwan, advising that during peak times at national holidays (e.g. Tomb Sweeping Day), the toll prices will become fixed price, in turn removing the 20 km discount.

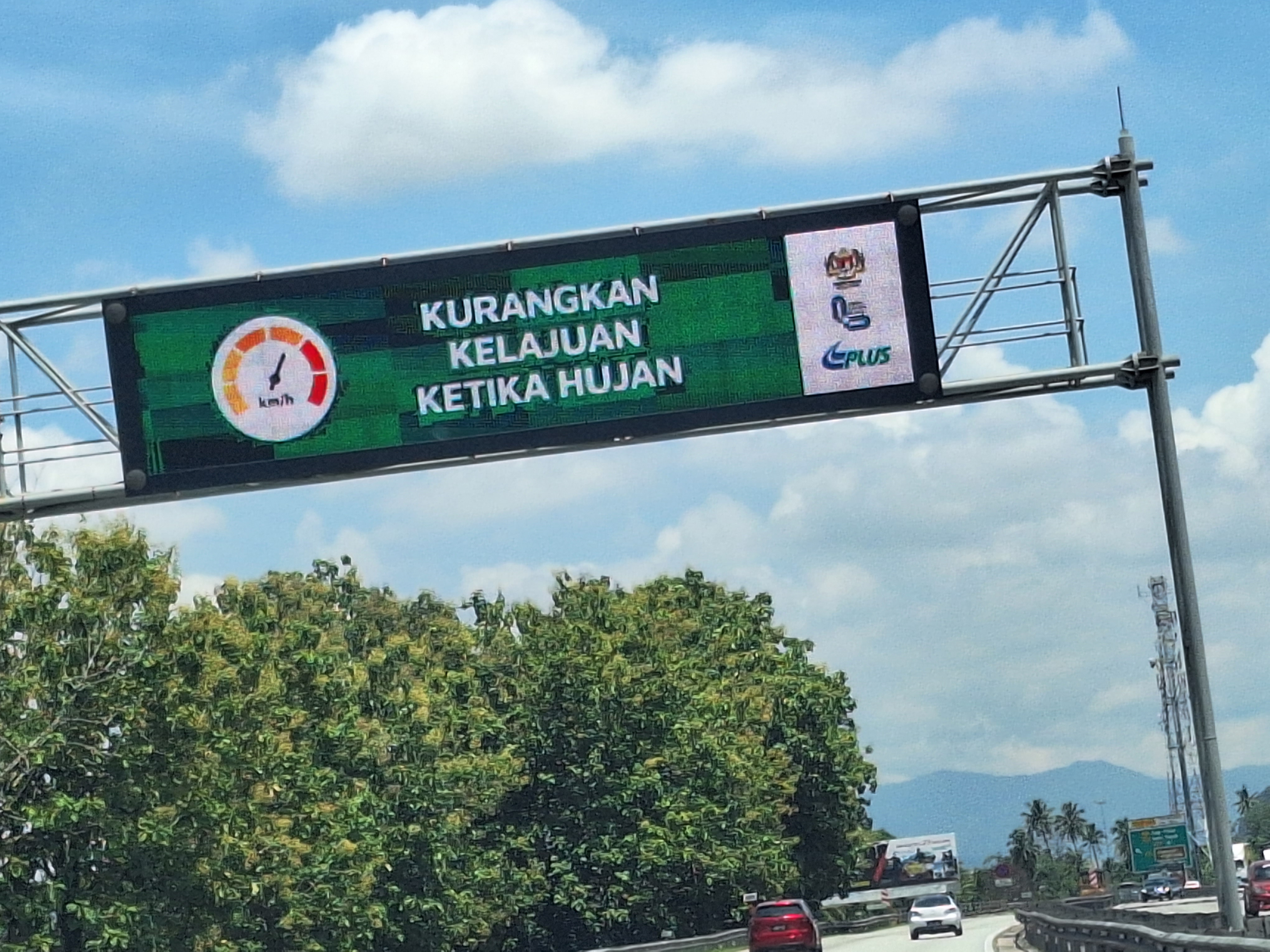
Fully graphical variable message sign reminding motorists to reduce speed during rain in North-South Expressway, Perak, Malaysia.

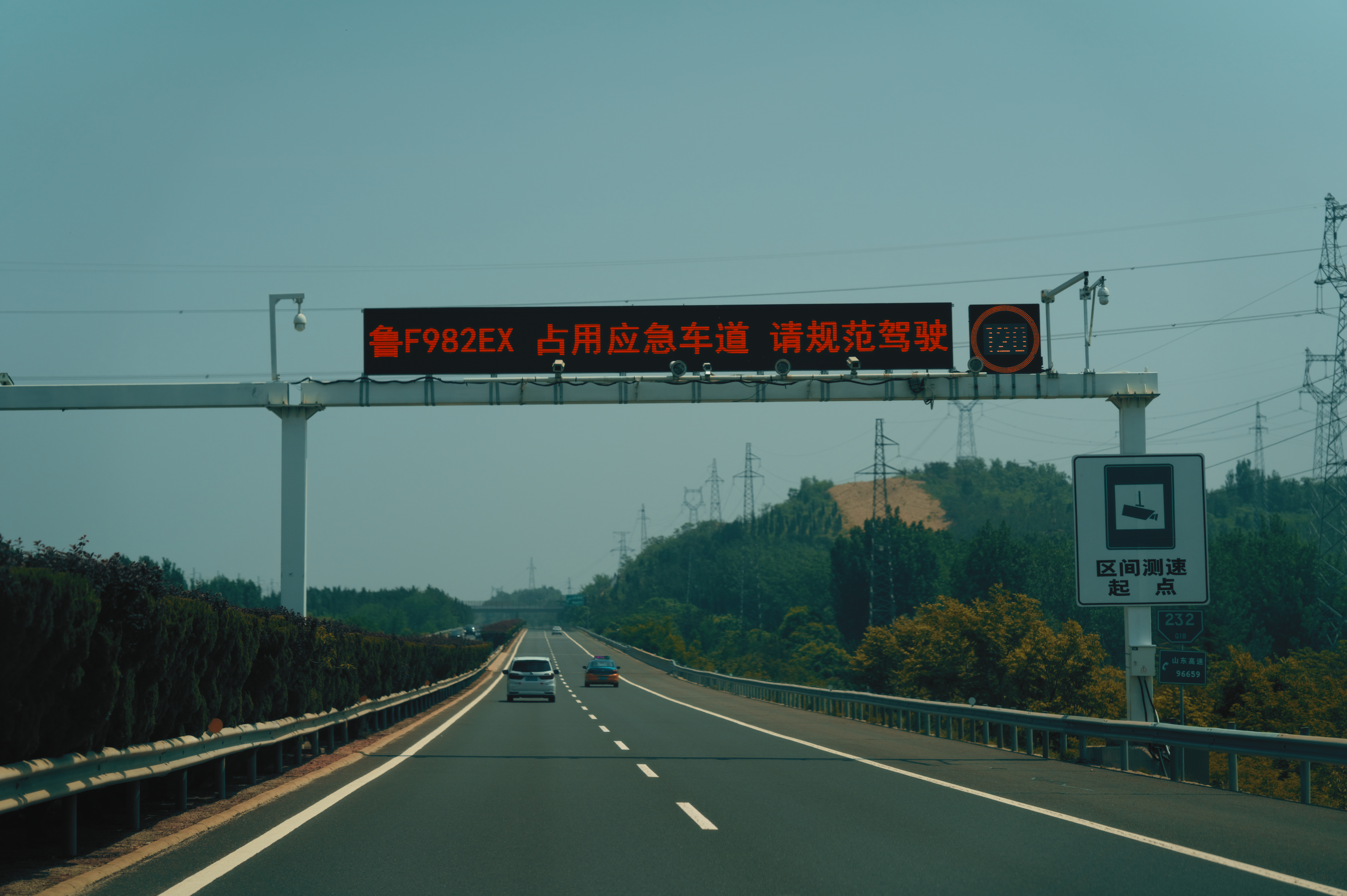
A "name-and-shame" variable message sign along the G18 Expressway in Shandong, China, which displays the licence plate numbers of offending motorists, along with the traffic infractions they've committed. In this example, the sign reads "鲁F982EX: Occupying the emergency lane, please drive according to the rules".

== See also ==
- Flip-disc display
- Gantry (transport)
- Glossary of road transport terms
- Passenger information system
- Radar speed sign
