= National Blue Alert Act of 2013 =

United States law

- Long title: To encourage, enhance, and integrate Blue Alert plans throughout the United States in order to disseminate information when a law enforcement officer is seriously injured or killed in the line of duty.
- Announced in: the 113th United States Congress
- Sponsored by: Rep. Michael G. Grimm (R, NY-11)
- Number of co-sponsors: 3

Codification
- Acts affected: Omnibus Crime Control and Safe Streets Act of 1968
- U.S.C. sections created: 42 U.S.C. 3796b(6), section 534 of title 28, United States Code,
- Agencies affected: United States Department of Justice, Federal Bureau of Investigation, Department of Homeland Security, United States Department of Transportation, Federal Communications Commission.

Legislative history
- Introduced in the House as H.R. 180 by Rep. Michael Grimm (R-NY) on January 4, 2013; Committee consideration by United States House Committee on the Judiciary, United States House Judiciary Subcommittee on Crime, Terrorism, Homeland Security and Investigations; Passed the House on May 15, 2013 (Roll Call Vote 144: 406-2)

The National Blue Alert Act of 2013 (H.R. 180) is a bill that was introduced in the United States House of Representatives of the 113th United States Congress on January 4, 2013. The bill instructs the Department of Justice (DOJ) to create a national Blue Alert communication system under the direction of a national coordinator. The system would spread important information about law enforcement officers hurt or killed in the line of duty in an attempt to make catching the perpetrators easier.

== Background ==
Existing alert systems in the United States, such as the Amber alert or Silver Alert, use a variety of means to notify people of an issue. Amber alerts announce missing or kidnapped children, while Silver Alerts announce missing senior citizens, especially those with dementia. Amber alerts are distributed via commercial radio stations, Internet radio, satellite radio, television stations, and cable TV by the Emergency Alert System and NOAA Weather Radio (where they are termed "Child Abduction Emergency" or "Amber alerts"). The alerts are also issued via e-mail, electronic traffic-condition signs, the LED billboards which are located outside of newer Walgreens locations, along with the LED/LCD signs of billboard companies such as Clear Channel Outdoor, CBS Outdoor and Lamar, or through Wireless device SMS text messages. Silver Alerts use a wide array of media outlets – such as commercial radio stations, television stations, and cable television – to broadcast information about missing persons. Silver Alerts also use variable-message signs on roadways to alert motorists to be on the lookout for missing seniors. In cases in which a missing person is believed to be missing on foot, Silver Alerts have used Reverse 911 or other emergency notification systems to notify nearby residents of the neighborhood surrounding the missing person's last known location.

== Provisions/Elements of the bill ==
This summary is based largely on the summary provided by the Congressional Research Service, a public domain source.

The National Blue Alert Act of 2013 directs the United States Attorney General to establish a national Blue Alert communications network within the Department of Justice (DOJ) to disseminate information when a law enforcement officer is seriously injured or killed in the line of duty. This new National Blue Alert system would coordinate with federal, state, and local Blue Alert plans. The Attorney General is also ordered to assign an existing DOJ officer to act as the national coordinator of the Blue Alert communications network.

The bill then explains what the duties of that new national coordinator would be. They include:

(1) providing assistance to states and local governments that are using Blue Alert plans;
(2) establishing voluntary guidelines for states and local governments to use in developing such plans;
(3) developing protocols for efforts to apprehend suspects;
(4) working with states to ensure appropriate regional coordination of various elements of the network;
(5) establishing an advisory group to assist states, local governments, law enforcement agencies, and other entities in initiating, facilitating, and promoting Blue Alert plans;
(6) acting as the nationwide point of contact for the development of the network and the regional coordination of Blue Alerts through the network; and
(7) determining what procedures and practices are in use for notifying law enforcement and the public when a law enforcement officer is killed or seriously injured in the line of duty and which of the procedures and practices are effective and that do not require the expenditure of additional resources to implement

Congress places two specific requirements on the guidelines that the national coordinator would create. First, the guidelines must provide that appropriate information relating to a Blue Alert is disseminated to officials of law enforcement, public health, and other agencies. Second, the guidelines must provide mechanisms that ensure that Blue Alerts comply with all applicable federal, state, and local privacy laws and regulations and include standards that specifically provide for the protection of the civil liberties of law enforcement officers and their families.

Finally, the bill directs the national coordinator to annually submit a report on their activities and the effectiveness and status of the Blue Alert plans that are in effect or being developed.

=== Congressional Budget Office report ===
The Congressional Budget Office report stated that "based on the costs of similar activities, CBO estimates that it would cost about $1 million annually from appropriated funds for DOJ to establish and administer the new program. Enacting the legislation would not affect direct spending or revenues; therefore, pay-as-you-go procedures do not apply."

== Procedural history ==
=== House ===
Rep. Michael Grimm (R-NY) introduced the National Blue Alert Act of 2013 on January 4, 2013. It was referred to the United States House Committee on the Judiciary. On January 25, 2013, it was referred to the United States House Judiciary Subcommittee on Crime, Terrorism, Homeland Security and Investigations. The bill was reported by the House Judiciary Committee on May 7, 2013. On May 10, 2013, the bill had 14 co-sponsors - 8 Democrats and 6 Republicans. It passed the House on May 15, 2013 in Roll Call Vote 144: 406–2.

== Debate ==
The National Association of Police Organizations, a lobbying group for American police organizations, wrote a letter to Rep. Michael Grimm in support of the National Blue Alert Act of 2013. In the letter, the organization's president argued that "creating a nationwide system to respond to criminal action against law enforcement officers will advance safety and improve communications across the law enforcement community".

The Federal Law Enforcement Officers Association endorsed and backed a reintroduction of the proposal in 2015.

== State actions ==
After President Barack Obama signed the bill in May 2015, 27 states had blue alerts as of December 2023, according to the Center for Missing Persons.

== Emergency Alert System activation ==
In 2017, Blue Alerts became an official Emergency Alert System alert that could be sent out on NOAA Weather Radios, televisions, and radio stations.

088 
WOUS44 KOHX 200351
BLUTN 

BULLETIN - EAS ACTIVATION REQUESTED
Blue Alert
Tennessee Bureau of Investigation
Relayed by National Weather Service Nashville TN
1051 PM CDT Fri Jul 19 2024 /1151 PM EDT Fri Jul 19 2024/

The following message is transmitted at the request of the
Tennessee Bureau of Investigation.

The Tennessee Bureau of Investigation has issued a statewide Blue
Alert for unknown subjects traveling in a white Kia Forte with 
temporary tag Q 9 S C 4 J R, driven by two black males with face 
tattoos. The subjects in the vehicle are wanted for shooting a 
Tennessee Highway Patrol Trooper in Putnam County. The vehicle has
a tail light out on the right passenger side. There is no known 
direction of travel at this time. If you have any information 
concerning the occupants or whereabouts of this white Kia Forte, 
please contact the Tennessee Bureau of Investigation at 1 8 0 0 T
B I F I N D.

$$

== See also ==
- List of bills in the 113th United States Congress
- 113th United States Congress
