= Smart work zone =

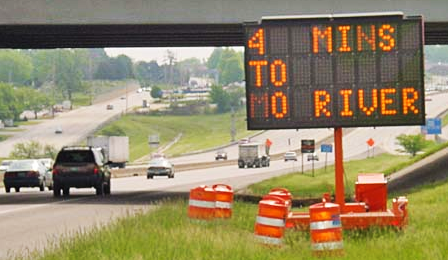
A smart work zone

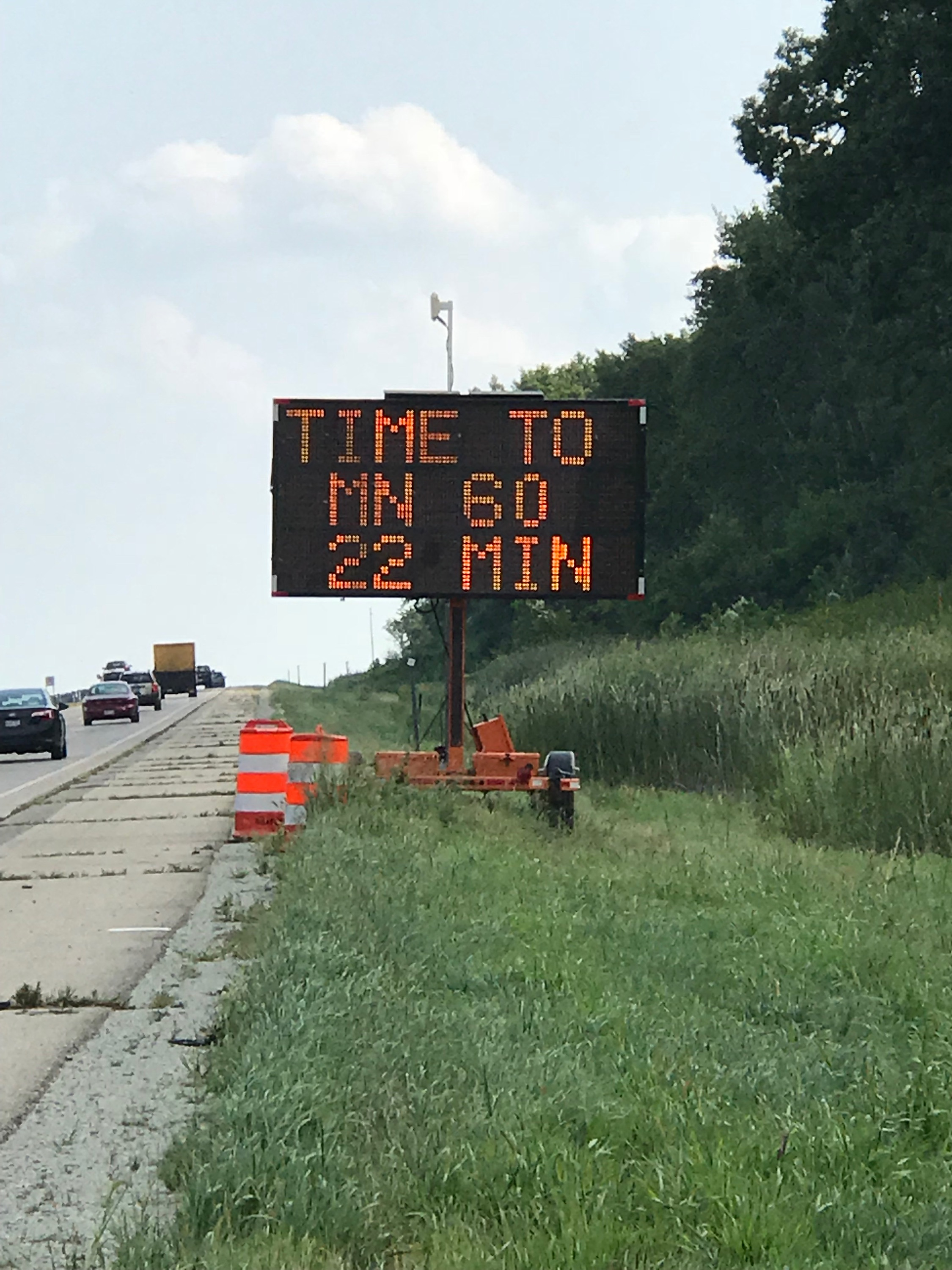
Sensors detect traffic flow through this 15 mile Smart Work Zone and display "travel time" to drivers.

A smart work zone or intelligent work zone refers to a site-specific configuration of traffic control technology deployed within a roadway work zone to increase the safety of construction workers, provide "real-time" travel information, and efficiently route motorists through a work zone. Smart work zones reduce the dependency on human "flaggers" and make the work zone safer for roadway workers.

Common terms used to describe equipment configuration used within smart work zones:

- Smart Arrow Board
- Zipper Merge
- Smart Traffic Monitoring System
- Advanced Queue Warning System
- End of Queue Detection System
- Dynamic Late Merge
- Queue Detection System
- Portable queue warning alert system
- Queue warning system
- Work zone queue detection warning system
- Stopped traffic advisory system
- Portable queue detection
- Conflict Warning System
- Over Height Vehicle Detection
- Portable Radar Sensors
- Trucks Entering System
- Variable Speed Limit
- Dynamic Speed Display
- Blue Tooth System Travel Time System
- Portable Rumble Strips

Smart work zones often use radar guns or other non-intrusive sensors to detect the presence and speed of vehicles approaching a work zone, in order to display an appropriate message on one or more variable message signs.

In a "dynamic merge" system, for example, vehicles approaching a lane closure are directed to use all available lanes when congestion develops and speeds are low. When speeds are high, motorists are directed to merge early or are left to use their own judgement. Such a system is usually deployed in addition to traditional static messaging.
