= Text display =

Electronic alphanumeric display device

A text display is an electronic alphanumeric display device that is mainly or only capable of showing text, or extremely limited graphic characters. This includes electromechanical split-flap displays, vane displays, and flip-disc displays; all-electronic liquid-crystal displays, incandescent eggcrate displays, LED displays, and vacuum fluorescent displays; and even electric nixie tubes.

There are several ways to form text for display. A segment display uses lines, while a dot-matrix display uses a grid of dots, and both of these are seen in LCD, LED, VFD, and vane/disc types. For split-flap displays, the characters or words are pre-printed, and for nixie tubes the shapes are also pre-formed. In any case, the display elements are controlled by electronics which activate them in the correct physical and temporal sequence to show the desired information.

Text displays are used in everything from clocks (clock radios, wristwatches) to variable-message signs (departure boards, intelligent transportation systems), because until the late 2000s, they were (and in many cases still are) the least expensive for their purpose.

== Text display types ==
=== LED text displays ===
LED text displays refer to types that are specialized and limited to display of alpha-numeric characters. Most types display either one character or a group of characters. One character is generally displayed by a matrix of LEDs, or by a set of segments.

=== Liquid-crystal display ===
A liquid-crystal display (LCD) is a flat panel display, electronic visual display, video display that uses the light modulating or polarizing properties of liquid crystals (LCs). LCs do not emit light directly. A character display type is limited to and specialized for display of alphanumeric characters.

They are used in a wide range of applications, including computer monitors, television, instrument panels, aircraft cockpit displays, signage, etc. They are common in consumer devices such as video players, gaming devices, clocks, watches, calculators, and telephones.

The low electrical power consumption of LCDs enables them to be used in battery-powered electronic equipment. It is an electronically modulated optical device made up of any number of pixels filled with liquid crystals and arrayed in front of a light source (backlight) or reflector to produce images in color or monochrome. The earliest discovery leading to the development of LCD technology, the discovery of liquid crystals, dates from 1888. By 2008, worldwide sales of televisions with LCD screens had surpassed the sale of CRT units.

=== Eggcrate displays ===
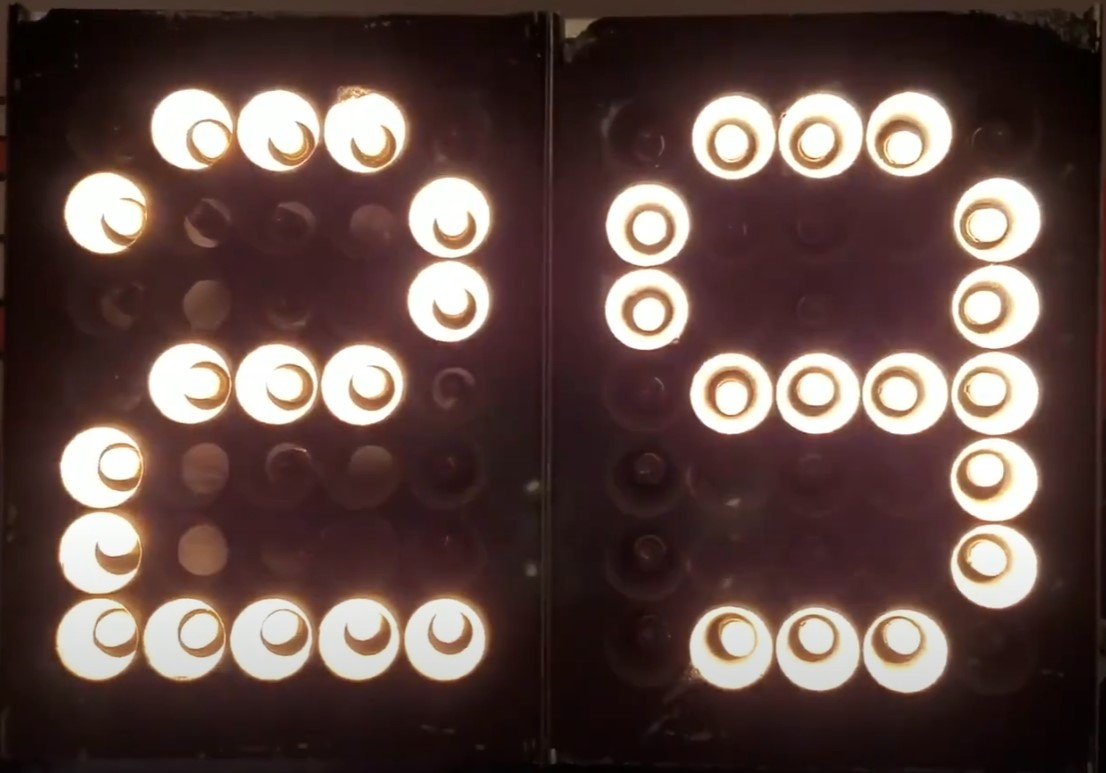
A typical 5x7 eggcrate display matrix

An eggcrate display is one older method of displaying an alphanumeric character. It consists of a matrix of incandescent light bulbs. A foam rubber mask with an array of holes surrounding the bulbs is attached to the display, causing it to resemble an egg crate.

Some eggcrate displays use a complete 5×7 matrix for each digit, permitting the display of nearly all alphanumeric characters. Other types display only numeric characters and optionally a dollar sign. This type of eggcrate display is popularly used for sports scoreboards.

Eggcrate displays have been used on many game shows to display contestants' scores and/or for countdown clocks because other types of displays, such as LED seven-segment displays, were prone to being washed out by bright studio lights. Though they continued to see extensive use well into the late 1990s, many shows began adopting LCDs in the 2000s. They have also been used as variable-message signs on highways, although they were later superseded by flip-disc, fiber optic, and eventually LED displays.

=== Vane displays ===
A vane display is an electro-mechanical type of 7-segment display. Unlike LED and VFD segmented displays, vane displays are composed of seven physical surfaces, typically painted white, but occasionally other colors, such as yellow or fluorescent green. If a segment is to be displayed as "off", it will be rotated so that its edge faces forward, with the painted surface pointing away and not visible. A segment that is to be displayed as "on" will be rotated so that the painted surface is shown.

== See also ==
- Display device
