= Rapid DNA =

Forensic test

Rapid DNA (UK:Rapid DNA profiling) describes the fully automated (hands free) process of developing a CODIS Core STR profile or other STR profile from a reference sample buccal swab. The “swab in – profile out” process consists of automated extraction, amplification, separation, detection and allele calling without human intervention. An instrument designed to perform such rapid DNA analysis is called a DNA "magic box" by enforcement authorities.

The FBI established a Rapid DNA Program Office in 2010 to direct the development and integration of Rapid DNA technology for use by law enforcement. The Program Office works with the Department of Defense, the Department of Homeland Security, the National Institute of Standards and Technology, the National Institute of Justice, and other federal agencies to ensure the coordinated development of this new technology among federal agencies. The Program Office also works with state and local law enforcement agencies and state bureaus of identification through the FBI's Criminal Justice Information Services Division Advisory Policy Board to facilitate the effective and efficient integration of Rapid DNA in the police booking environment.

Several manufacturers have developed instruments for Rapid DNA analysis such as IntegenX, now part of Thermo Fisher Scientific based in Waltham, MA, and ANDE based in Waltham, MA. Following commercial availability, the FBI works with federal, state, and local CODIS laboratories and the Scientific Working Group on DNA Analysis Methods to test, evaluate, and validate the hands-free instruments for law enforcement use. RapidHIT systems include instruments and RapidLINK software which will enable use for law enforcement. As of March 18 2016 one Rapid DNA instrument was approved by the FBI for submission of samples to NDIS/CODIS without manual review: the DNAScan manufactured by NetBio in Waltham, MA. Effective January 1, 2017, the DNAScan lost its approved status as CODIS-participating labs are required to include the 20 CODIS Core Loci.

== Law enforcement use ==
The goal of the FBI's Rapid DNA initiative was to develop commercial instruments capable of producing a CODIS-compatible DNA profile within two hours and to integrate those instruments effectively within the existing CODIS structure to search unsolved crimes while an arrestee is in police custody during the booking process.

In 2012 the Palm Bay, Florida, Police Department received the first commercially produced Rapid DNA unit placed in a police agency; an IntegenX RapidHIT 200 system. In January 2014, after a year of testing and validation, the Palm Bay Police began generating leads on real-world criminal cases, including producing a DNA profile in 90 minutes that linked a suspect to a burglary of a U.S. soldier's home that occurred while he was in Afghanistan. The Palm Bay Police department is known for applying various innovation technologies in real-life situations and is the pioneer of the use of private lab services to create an effective DNA database.

On August 18, 2017, President Donald Trump signed into law the Rapid DNA Act of 2017 which amended the DNA Identification Act of 1994 (42 U.S.C. §14132) to allow CODIS upload of DNA profiles generated outside the accredited forensic laboratory. Once appropriate quality measures are put in place, for jurisdictions which allow DNA testing on arrest, the law will allow law enforcement to quickly query CODIS or other national databases with the DNA profile of an arrestee to ensure they are not linked to unsolved crimes before their release on bail.

In 2018, Rapid DNA technology was utilized during the Camp Fire for the victim identification effort. Three Rapid ANDE DNA instruments were utilized to process unidentified human remains samples.

Rapid DNA booking devices that have been approved for use at NDIS by a law enforcement booking station are:

- ANDE 6C Series G (effective October 21, 2022)
- RapidHIT™ ID DNA Booking Systemv1.1.2 (effective March 27, 2023)
- According to the Electronic Frontier Foundation, law enforcement use of Rapid DNA tends to create "rogue databases" as the collected samples and test results do not fit the guidelines for the FBI DNA database.

== Use in immigration enforcement ==
In May 2019, U.S. Immigration and Customs Enforcement and U.S. Customs and Border Protection piloted a program with Massachusetts-based ANDE. The program's intention is to expose "family unit fraud," the idea that asylum seeking adults and children traveling together are illicitly posing as biologically related. In June 2019, a $5.2 million contract to expand the program was awarded to Bode Cellmark Forensics, Inc., however, Bode Cellmark Forensics selected the Thermo Fisher Scientific RapidHIT ID DNA System to fulfil the contract and positioned 47 instruments along the Southern Border. Although the tests are voluntary, the consent forms indicate that a refusal to be tested may factor into decisions related to their amnesty conditions. Privacy advocates are concerned that the program is not truly voluntary, use a narrow definition of family, and may have too high a rate of error.

== Use in defense and intelligence ==
Rapid DNA systems have been developed in part with funding from the US Department of Defense and related intelligence agencies for their applicability for field forward operations. In addition to being able to develop DNA profiles from buccal swabs, both the RapidHIT and ANDE system are capable of analyzing very small amounts of samples such as touch samples, for example, the material left on a glass after a suspect has used it. The US military has reportedly tested several systems in field forward operations to employ DNA in the global effort to combat terrorism.

== Policies and Standards ==
Several important policies and quality standards must be addressed prior to the envisioned deployment of Rapid DNA in the booking station. After passage of the Rapid DNA Act of 2017, the FBI is issuing updates to the Quality Assurance Standards (QAS) to integrate Rapid DNA technology and standard operating procedures to non-laboratory environments. Guidelines for the use of this technology have been developed to maintain the quality and integrity of CODIS and the National DNA Index System, including guidelines on validation, use cases for the technology, and training for laboratory personnel and law enforcement.

=== Forensic (Crime Scene Evidence) Sample Rapid DNA Requirements for CODIS ===
Effective July 1, 2025, national quality assurance standards (QAS) and procedures were in place for the use of Rapid DNA in forensic casework. There are six criteria that must be met for a forensic sample processed by a Rapid DNA instrument to be eligible for search or upload to CODIS:

1. The Rapid DNA Instrument location and operation must fall under the ISO 17025 accreditation of a CODIS laboratory.
2. The forensic evidence samples must be processed in accordance with the 2025 Forensic Quality Assurance Standards (QAS) on or after July 1, 2025.
3. The Rapid DNA cartridge/chip used must be approved by NDIS for forensic sample use.
4. The CODIS laboratory has validated modified Rapid DNA analysis for the specific Rapid DNA Instrument cartridge/chip.
5. The Rapid DNA generated forensic sample data has undergone interpretation and review by qualified laboratory personnel prior to upload or search in CODIS.
6. The forensic evidence meets CODIS eligibility requirements (evidence was recovered directly from the crime scene and is attributed to the putative perpetrator).

== Popular culture ==
The RapidHIT 200 is shown in CSI: Crime Scene Investigation season 15 episode 1 "The CSI Effect", first aired September 29, 2014.
