= Silver Alert =

Public notification system in the United States

Silver Alert is a public notification system in the United States to broadcast information about missing persons – especially senior citizens with Alzheimer's disease, dementia, or other mental disabilities – in order to aid in locating them.

Silver Alerts use a wide array of media outlets – such as commercial radio stations, television stations, and cable television – to broadcast information about missing persons. In some states (specifically Arizona, California, Colorado, Florida, Illinois, Maryland, New Jersey, North Dakota, Texas, Washington, Utah, and Wisconsin), Silver Alerts also use variable-message signs on roadways to alert motorists to be on the lookout for missing seniors. In cases in which a missing person is believed to be missing on foot, Silver Alerts have used Reverse 911 or other emergency notification systems to notify nearby residents of the neighborhood surrounding the missing person's last known location. Silver Alerts can also be used for children who are missing without being in danger or abducted.

Supporters of Silver Alert point to the United States' growing elderly population as a reason for new programs to locate missing seniors. Approximately 60% of dementia sufferers will wander off at least once.

However, a 2012 review of research into missing-senior programs found that Silver Alert had not been evaluated to determine whether it was effective in returning those people to safety, or even whether wandering was a severe enough problem to merit expending resources to address it. It characterized Silver Alert's rate of facilitating returns of missing people as "[i]mpossible to tell", because the statistical records are distributed among state agencies which do not necessarily publicize them. The researchers also criticized it and similar programs for prioritizing safety over civil rights such as autonomy, and noted that broadcasting a missing person's identity might put them at risk for exploitation (such as identity theft).

== History ==
In December 2005, Oklahoma state Representative Fred Perry (R-Tulsa) announced his intention to introduce an "AMBER Alert for seniors", which he dubbed "Silver Alert." In March 2006, the Oklahoma House of Representatives passed H.R. 1075, a resolution calling for a Silver Alert system to find missing seniors. In response to this non-binding resolution, the Oklahoma Department of Public Safety added Silver Alert notifications to the statewide alerts sent to law enforcement agencies and the media for rapid distribution. In April 2009, Governor Brad Henry signed legislation permanently establishing the Silver Alert program.

In Georgia, public efforts to locate missing seniors increased following the April 2004 disappearance of Mattie Moore, a 68-year-old Atlanta resident with Alzheimer's disease. Eight months after Moore's disappearance, her body was found 500 yards (460 m) from her home. The City of Atlanta created "Mattie's Call" to coordinate and support Metro Atlanta law enforcement, emergency management and broadcasters to issue an urgent bulletin in missing persons cases involving persons with Alzheimer's disease, dementia and other mental disabilities. Legislation to create a statewide Mattie's Call program was enacted in April 2006.

In Florida, local and state government officials worked together to develop a pilot Silver Alert program following the case of an 86-year-old person who drove away from her assisted-living facility on February 26, 2008, and was found dead a week later, 10 miles (16 km) away in the Intracoastal Waterway near a boat ramp and her submerged car.

=== National growth ===
Thirty-seven states and the District of Columbia have Silver Alert or similar programs targeting missing seniors.

Twenty-eight states and the District of Columbia have missing persons recovery programs that are formally called "Silver Alert":

- Alaska
- Arizona
- Arkansas
- California
- Connecticut
- District of Columbia
- Florida
- Illinois
- Indiana
- Kansas
- Louisiana
- Maine
- Maryland
- Massachusetts
- Mississippi
- Nevada
- New Jersey
- New Mexico
- North Carolina
- North Dakota
- Oklahoma
- Oregon
- Rhode Island
- South Carolina
- Tennessee
- Texas
- Washington
- West Virginia
- Wisconsin

Additionally, nine states have programs to help locate missing seniors that are not officially called "Silver Alert" but contain criteria similar to existing Silver Alert programs:

- Alabama – Missing Senior Alert
- Colorado – Missing Senior Citizen Alert
- Georgia – Mattie's Call
- Kentucky – Golden Alert
- Michigan – Mozelle Senior or Vulnerable Adult Medical Alert Act
- New Hampshire – Missing Senior Citizen Alert
- New York – Missing Vulnerable Adult Alert
- Ohio – Missing Adult Alert
- Virginia – Senior Alert

Plus, ten states have missing-persons alert systems with broader criteria than conventional Silver Alert programs. These missing-person alerts apply to larger categories of endangered persons, or apply to all missing people, regardless of age or impairment:

- Delaware – Gold Alert
- Idaho – Endangered Missing Person Alert
- Minnesota – Brandon's Law
- Missouri – Endangered Person Advisory
- Montana – Missing and Endangered Persons Advisory
- Nebraska – Endangered Missing Advisory
- Pennsylvania – Missing and Endangered Person Advisory
- South Dakota – Endangered Persons Advisory
- Utah – Endangered Person Advisory
- Wyoming – Endangered Person Advisory

==== Mattie's Call ====
Mattie's Call is a law-enforcement-initiated public notification system used to locate missing elderly or otherwise disabled persons in Georgia. The system was established as part of House Bill 728 by the Georgia General Assembly in 2006 and is named in reference to 67-year-old Mattie Moore, an Alzheimer's disease patient who wandered away from her Atlanta home in 2004 and was found dead 8 months later in a wooded area 250 meters away.

Mattie's Call is modeled after the AMBER Alert system used to locate missing or abducted children; it uses public-service announcements on radio stations, displays on publicly controlled signaling devices and transmissions to law-enforcement agencies in an attempt to raise awareness of and help the public locate the missing endangered person. To qualify for the issuing of a Mattie's Call alert, the following criteria must be met:

- The missing person must be elderly or otherwise meet Georgia's definition of a disabled adult, which is an individual who is developmentally or cognitively impaired or suffer from dementia or other cognitive disabilities.
- A law enforcement agency verifies the person's disappearance and eliminates alternative explanations for their disappearance.
- The missing person is believed to be in immediate danger of serious injury or death.
- The missing person is listed in the database of the National Crime Information Center.
- There is enough information that exists regarding the missing person that can adequately assist the public in locating them.
- A law enforcement agency is to issue statewide broadcasts to other law enforcement and/or 911 centers in addition to contacting local media in regards to the missing person.

=== Federal legislation ===
In May 2008, Representative Lloyd Doggett introduced the National Silver Alert Act in the U.S. House of Representatives, a bill to encourage, enhance, and integrate Silver Alert plans throughout the United States. Similar legislation was filed by Representatives Gus Bilirakis (R-FL) and Sue Myrick (R-NC). The three bills were combined into a single bill, H.R. 6064. The bill was passed by the House in September 2008 by a voice vote, but the 110th Congress adjourned before it could be considered in the U.S. Senate.

The National Silver Alert Act was re-introduced in the 111th Congress as H.R. 632. It was passed by the House of Representatives on February 11, 2009, on a voice vote. Companion legislation (S.557) was introduced in the Senate by Senator Mel Martinez (R-FL) and Senator Herb Kohl (D-WI).

Senator Joe Manchin (D-WV) reintroduced the bill as S.1814 in the 113th Congress on December 12, 2013. The National Silver Alert Act was referred to the United States Senate Committee on the Judiciary but was not voted on before the U.S. Senate adjourned.

The National Silver Alert Act has been endorsed by the Assisted Living Federation of America (ALFA), Alzheimer's Association, Alzheimer's Foundation of America, Elder Justice Coalition, National Silver Haired Congress, the National Association of Police Organizations and the National Sheriffs' Association.

== Criticism ==
Critics of Silver Alert have raised concerns that the proliferation of color-coded alerts will reduce their importance, risking that alerts would be ignored as a "wolf cry". For example, Texas has created an Amber Alert, Silver Alert and Blue Alert (issued to locate an assailant in the event a law enforcement officer is killed or injured.) In New York, Governor George Pataki vetoed Silver Alert legislation in 2003, citing his concern that it would weaken the Amber Alert system and make the alerts too common. In the absence of state-level legislation, local Silver Alert programs have been enacted by New York City and five New York counties: Rockland, Suffolk, Nassau, Niagara and Erie.

Some critics have raised concerns about the cost of implementing the Silver Alert program on a nationwide basis. The Congressional Budget Office has estimated that implementation of the National Silver Alert Act would cost $59 million over a five-year period. During the House debate on the cost, Representative Ted Poe (R-TX) noted that states with Silver Alerts have reported nominal costs associated with operating the system, since they are able to utilize existing Amber Alert infrastructure to issue Silver Alerts.

== Retrieval rate ==
In Texas, the Silver Alert system was invoked 52 times in the first year following its inception in September 2007. Of these alerts, 48 of the missing seniors were located safely, and 13 of these recoveries were directly attributable to Silver Alert.

In Florida, 136 Silver Alerts were issued in its first year (2008–2009), leading to 131 safe recoveries. 19 of these recoveries were directly attributable to Silver Alert. According to a press release by the office of the governor of Florida, in the 2 years following the initiation of the program in October 2008, 227 Silver Alerts were issued in Florida and 220 seniors were subsequently located safely; 36 of these recoveries were attributed directly to the Silver Alert. Over three years, 377 Silver Alerts have been issued in Florida, with 367 seniors located safely, and 51 of those recoveries attributed directly to the Silver Alert.

In North Carolina, 128 Silver Alerts were issued in 2008. Of these, 118 seniors were safely recovered.

In North Dakota, following the inception of Silver Alert in 2018, the state has not experienced a Silver Alert in which the missing individual was not found.

In Georgia, according to a spokesperson for the Georgia Bureau of Investigation, Mattie's Call garnered a safe return for 70 of the 71 calls issued between its inception in 2006 and January 2009.

In Wisconsin, 18 Silver Alerts were issued in the first 5 months of the program, out of which 15 of missing seniors were found and safely returned home.

== See also ==
- Amber Alert
