= Don't Look Up (disambiguation) =

Don't Look Up is a 2021 American satirical science fiction film released as a Netflix original film.

Don't Look Up may also refer to:

- Don't Look Up (soundtrack), soundtrack to the 2021 film
- Don't Look Up (1996 film), a Japanese horror film
- Don't Look Up (2009 film), American horror film

== See also ==
- "Don't Look", 2016 Adventure Time season 8 episode
- Don't Look Away (disambiguation)
- Don't Look Back (disambiguation)
- Don't Look Down (disambiguation)
- Don't Look Now (disambiguation)
- "Just Look Up", 2021 song by American singer-songwriter Ariana Grande and American rapper Kid Cudi, made for the movie Don't Look Up
- Look Up (disambiguation)
