= Don't Look Up (soundtrack) =

Don't Look Up (Soundtrack from the Netflix Film)

Soundtrack album by Nicholas Britell
- Released: December 10, 2021
- Recorded: 2021
- Genre: Jazz; pop; rock; electronic; traditional orchestral; acoustic; experimental; ambience
- Length: 56:54
- Label: Maisie Music Publishing; Republic Records
- Producer: Nicholas Britell

Nicholas Britell chronology
Italian Studies (2021)	Don't Look Up (2021)	Carmen (2022)

Singles from Don't Look Up (Soundtrack from the Netflix Film)
- 1. "Just Look Up" Released: December 3, 2021

Don't Look Up (Soundtrack from the Netflix Film) is the soundtrack to the 2021 film Don't Look Up directed by Adam McKay. The film's original score is composed by Nicholas Britell in his fourth collaboration with McKay, following The Big Short (2015), Vice (2018) and the HBO television series Succession (2019–2022), where McKay was the executive producer. Britell's score consisted of widest range of instrumentation used in the film, that produces multiple genres and musical styles, ranging from big-band jazz, traditional orchestral sounds and electronics and offbeat music. The album was led by the promotional single "Just Look Up" performed by Ariana Grande and Kid Cudi. that was described as a "love song for the end of the world". The song was issued on December 3, 2021 for streaming and digital download. The album featuring Britell's original score and an original song titled "Second Nature" by Bon Iver, was released on December 10, by Republic Records. The musical score received critical acclaim and led him receiving several nominations, including the Academy Award for Best Original Score, his third Academy Award nomination, following Moonlight (2016) and If Beale Street Could Talk (2018).

== Development ==
Britell said that each of his project was a tonal experiment and Don't Look Up was the most challenging as "it had to be a mixture of tones, incredibly comedic and at the same time it had to be about the existential crisis of the planet". After going through the initial prospects of the script, he was asked to write a piece of music played onset — especially for the planned telescope sequence where Kate Dibiasky (Jennifer Lawrence) and Dr. Randall Mindy (Leonardo DiCaprio) discover the comet. Britell wrote the demo titled "Overture to Logic and Knowledge" as an ode to science, where he conceived the piece as feeling "almost like looking at Earth from above. There's a sense of remove." But while including this piece in the climatic sequence when both Mindy, Dibiasky and company at their last supper before the comet strikes, it sounded like a requiem for humanity, which Britell felt it "heartbreaking" when the cue was juxtaposed in the scene.

The main theme is an "exciting up-tempo big-band piece" that consisted of various jazz players from London, which was "something about capturing the chaos and craziness that needed to go to this heightened place. It's bombastic but musically there's a bit of melancholy." Britell felt the mood of "being in World War II but about to lose" regarding how humans response for an extinction event ridiculously, which inspired a World War II-era ensemble music but multiple instruments being used, as "There's a brashness to the frequency of this film and the music had to convey or resonate with that."

The musical score featured the widest range of instrumentation: full string orchestra, brass, woodwinds, flutes, harps, celestas, pianos, toy piano, half a dozen saxophones (including bass sax), farfisa organ, and large bass synthesizers. A piece written for the film "The Call" — was played when both characters are on the phone with NASA — became the key to crack the musical code. It consisted of odd instruments in a clash of musical sounds and vocals escalating in intensity, Britell said "It's the moment where we go from the world that we think we live in to the world that we actually live in. A comet is coming and we will follow the science. But politics intervenes. We had to turn up the dial from the 'OMG a comet's coming!' to what was going to happen next." While working on the film's score, Hurricane Ida hit Britell's house causing the roof to break in, explaining his experience on the score composition, saying:

"The water was pouring down and I told Adam, 'Trust me: I feel anxious.' I literally screamed into the microphone over the piece. I pitched my voice up an octave and ran it through some tape filters, woven into the track. I'm humming the main theme, but I'm also screaming multiples of me on top of itself. That is harmony and cacophony, almost like a losing-your-mind kind of feeling."

The theme surrounding Peter Isherwell (Mark Rylance) and his BASH company had an electronic vibe that highlighted celestas, toy piano, farfisa organ, and strange synth sounds, reflecting both science and power. He said "One of the greatest values I think score can provide to a film is that sense of cohesion, if everything is linked. In this case, the link was actually a story point, which was the fact that BASH Communications' tentacles were everywhere ... You're feeling this sort of psychotic jingle all the time." In a sequence where, Isherwell presents his pitch to the President of the United States Janie Orlean (Meryl Streep) on breaking the comet into smaller comets for business, Britell soared the music "a level of seriousness that is so grandiloquent" to be much obvious on the joke. He called his friend and soloist Tim Fain, and said "I have a really, really virtuosic, cadenza-like violin solo I want you to do. There's a male choir, women's choir, full orchestra, brass, and then you have this huge descant violin line on top. That one's completely over the top," for which he agreed.

He also wrote tunes for various commercials, hold music, ringtones within the film, and theme music for "The Daily Rip" — the fictional talk show, which was not "goofing" but made subconsciously. In addition to the score, Britell also co-wrote two original songs: "Just Look Up" a song performed by Ariana Grande and Kid Cudi on-camera, along with Taura Stinson, was a combination of "love song and rallying cry for action". "Second Nature" written by Justin Vernon and performed by his band Bon Iver was included in the end credits.

== Track listing ==
All tracks are written by Nicholas Britell, except where indicated.

No.	Title	Writer(s)	Artist(s)	Length
1.	"Just Look Up"	Britell; Ariana Grande; Scott Mescudi; Taura Stinson	Ariana Grande; Kid Cudi	3:21
2.	"Discovery"			1:21
3.	"Ephemeris"			1:05
4.	"On Hold"			0:27
5.	"The Call"			2:32
6.	"C-5 Galaxy"			1:04
7.	"Don't Look Up" (Main Title Theme)			0:51
8.	"BASH Corporate Ident" ("Liif")			0:40
9.	"Hyperobject Approaches"			0:46
10.	"My Boyfriend Broke Up With Me"			0:32
11.	"The Arrest"			1:04
12.	"It's A Strange Glorious World"			2:34
13.	"The Launch"			3:59
14.	"The BASH Presentation"			2:07
15.	"Kate Goes Home"			0:59
16.	"FEMA-BASH Commercial"			0:58
17.	"Arrival At The Hangar"			0:58
18.	"There Is A Comet"			1:17
19.	"The Comet Appears"			2:55
20.	"The Prayer For Stuff"			0:50
21.	"The BASH Launch"			0:43
22.	"Twenty-Four Drones Is Enough"			0:54
23.	"It All Comes Down To This"			0:42
24.	"Thanksgiving" (Overture To Logic And Knowledge)			4:40
25.	"The End?"			2:18
26.	"Memento Mori"			1:26
27.	"Don't Look Up" (End Credits Suite)			2:29
28.	"Logic Waltz In B Major" (Bonus Track)			1:43
29.	"Don't Look Up" (Main Title Suite; Bonus Track)			4:08
30.	"Ode To Science" (Bonus Track)			3:29
31.	"Second Nature"	Britell; Justin Vernon	Bon Iver	4:02
Total length:				56:54

== Reception ==
Music critic Jonathan Broxton wrote "Britell's way of tackling this difficult subject matter to be intellectually fulfilling and musically enjoyable. Satire is a challenging genre for composers; you can't undercut or undersell the points that the film is trying to make – both serious and comedic – but you also can't completely telegraph the joke by playing it solely for laughs, as then you run the risk of not conveying the serious aspect of the story to the audience. Britell has successfully walked that tonal tightrope, and considering that the film itself is appealing to the left-leaning members of the industry, looks likely to snag an Oscar nomination." Anton Smit of Soundtrack World wrote "Nicholas Britell's music is a fantastic match for this movie. Writing music for a comedy with such a satirical dark undertone can be a challenge. Britell's approach to it by writing a semi-serious score was the perfect solution. In addition, not only are the themes Britell has created wonderful on their own, he was also able to transform them beautifully into music to match the scenes."

== Accolades ==
Award	Date of ceremony	Category	Recipient(s)	Result	Ref.
Academy Awards	March 27, 2022	Best Original Score	Nicholas Britell	Nominated	
British Academy Film Awards	March 13, 2022	Best Original Music	Nicholas Britell	Nominated	
Critics' Choice Movie Awards	March 13, 2022	Best Song	"Just Look Up" (Ariana Grande, Kid Cudi, Nicholas Britell, and Taura Stinson)	Nominated	
Critics' Choice Movie Awards	March 13, 2022	Best Score	Nicholas Britell	Nominated	
Georgia Film Critics Association Awards	January 14, 2022	Best Original Song	"Just Look Up" (Ariana Grande, Kid Cudi, Nicholas Britell, and Taura Stinson)	Nominated	
Hollywood Music in Media Awards	November 17, 2021	Best Original Score in a Feature Film	Nicholas Britell	Won	
Hollywood Music in Media Awards	November 17, 2021	Best Original Song in a Feature Film	"Just Look Up" (Ariana Grande, Kid Cudi, Nicholas Britell, and Taura Stinson)	Nominated	
Hollywood Music in Media Awards	November 17, 2021	Song – Onscreen Performance	Ariana Grande and Kid Cudi (for "Just Look Up")	Nominated	
Houston Film Critics Society Awards	January 19, 2022	Best Original Song	"Just Look Up" (Ariana Grande, Kid Cudi, Nicholas Britell, and Taura Stinson)	Nominated	
International Film Music Critics Association Awards	February 17, 2022	Best Original Score for a Comedy Film	Nicholas Britell	Nominated	
Society of Composers & Lyricists Awards	March 9, 2022	Outstanding Original Score for a Studio Film	Nicholas Britell	Nominated	
Society of Composers & Lyricists Awards	March 9, 2022	Outstanding Original Song for a Comedy or Musical Visual Media Production	"Just Look Up" (Ariana Grande, Kid Cudi, Nicholas Britell, and Taura Stinson)	Won	
St. Louis Gateway Film Critics Association Awards	December 19, 2021	Best Score	Nicholas Britell	Nominated	
