= List of awards and nominations received by Nicholas Britell =

Nicholas Britell awards and nominations
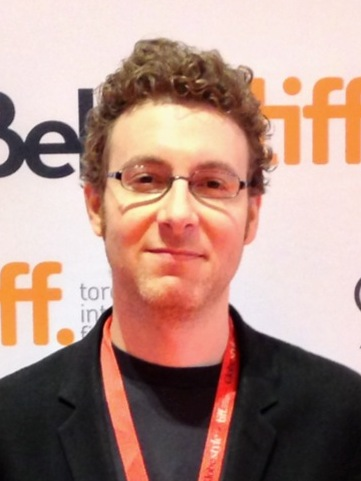
- Britell at the 2013 TIFF
Awards and nominations
Award	Wins	Nominations
Academy Awards	0	3
BAFTA Film Awards	0	1
Critics' Choice Movie Awards	0	2
Golden Globe Awards	0	1
Hollywood Music in Media Awards	2	7
Primetime Emmy Award	1	8
Satellite Awards	0	1

Totals (Note: Certain award groups do not simply award one winner. They acknowledge several different recipients, have runners-up, and have third place. Since this is a specific recognition and is different from losing an award, runner-up mentions are considered wins in this award tally. For simplification and to avoid errors, each award in this list has been presumed to have had a prior nomination.)
- Wins: 24
- Nominations: 76

This is a list of awards and nominations received by Nicholas Britell, an American film and television composer.

Britell received the Primetime Emmy Award Outstanding Original Main Title Theme Music in 2019 for his work on the HBO series Succession (2019-2023). He has also earned nominations for three Academy Awards, two BAFTA Award, a Golden Globe Award, and a Grammy Award.

He earned Academy Award for Best Original Score nominations for his work on the Barry Jenkins drama films Moonlight (2016), and If Beale Street Could Talk (2018) and Adam McKay's comedic Don't Look Up (2021). He also earned two BAFTA Award for Best Original Music nominations for If Beale Street Could Talk (2018) and Don't Look Up (2021) and a Golden Globe Award for Best Original Score for Moonlight (2016).

== Major Associations ==
=== Academy Awards ===
Year	Category	Nominated work	Result	Ref.
2016	Best Original Score	Moonlight	Nominated	
2018	Best Original Score	If Beale Street Could Talk	Nominated	
2021	Best Original Score	Don't Look Up	Nominated	

=== BAFTA Awards ===
Year	Category	Nominated work	Result	Ref.
British Academy Film Awards
2018	Best Original Score	If Beale Street Could Talk	Nominated	
2021	Best Original Score	Don't Look Up	Nominated	

=== Emmy Awards ===
Year	Category	Nominated work	Result	Ref.
Primetime Emmy Awards
2019	Outstanding Original Main Title Theme Music	Succession	Won	
2020	Outstanding Music Composition for a Series	Succession	Nominated	
2021	Outstanding Music Composition For A Limited Or Movie	The Underground Railroad	Nominated	
2022	Outstanding Music Composition for a Series	Succession	Nominated	
2023	Outstanding Music Composition for a Series	Succession	Nominated	
2023	Outstanding Music Composition for a Series	Andor	Nominated	
2023	Outstanding Original Main Title Theme Music	Andor	Nominated	
2025	Outstanding Original Music and Lyrics	"We Are the Ghor (Planetary Anthem)" (from Andor – Episode: "Who Are You?")	Nominated	

=== Golden Globe Awards ===
Year	Category	Nominated work	Result	Ref.
2016	Best Original Score	Moonlight	Nominated	

=== Grammy Awards ===
Year	Category	Nominated work	Result	Ref.
2023	Best Score Soundtrack for Visual Media	Succession	Nominated	

== Miscellaneous Award ==
=== Black Reel Awards ===
Year	Category	Nominated work	Result	Ref.
2017	Outstanding Score	Moonlight	Won	
2019	Outstanding Score	If Beale Street Could Talk	Won	

=== Critics' Choice Movie Awards ===
The Critics' Choice Movie Awards is an awards show presented annually by the American-Canadian Critics Choice Association (CCA) to honor the finest in cinematic achievement.

Year	Category	Nominated work	Result	Ref.
2016	Best Score	Moonlight	Nominated	
2019	Best Score	If Beale Street Could Talk	Nominated	
2021	Best Score	Don't Look Up	Nominated	
2021	Best Song	"Just Look Up"	Nominated	

=== Hollywood Music in Media Awards ===
The Hollywood Music in Media Awards (HMMA) is an award organization honoring original music (Song and Score) in all forms visual media including film, TV, video games, trailers, commercial advertisements, documentaries, music videos and special programs.

Year	Category	Nominated work	Result	Ref.
2016	Best Original Score - Feature Film	Moonlight	Won	
2017	Best Original Score - Feature Film	Battle of the Sexes	Nominated	
2018	Best Original Score - Feature Film	If Beale Street Could Talk	Nominated	
2018	Best Original Score - TV Show/Limited Series	Succession	Won	
2019	Best Original Score - Feature Film	The King	Nominated	
2019	Best Original Score - TV Show/Limited Series	Succession	Nominated	
2021	Best Original Score - Feature Film	Don't Look Up	Won	
2021	Best Original Song - Feature Film	"Just Look Up"	Nominated	
2022	Best Original Score - Feature Film	She Said	Nominated	

=== Satellite Awards ===
Year	Category	Nominated work	Result	Ref.
2019	Best Original Score	If Beale Street Could Talk	Nominated	

=== World Soundtrack Awards ===
Year	Category	Nominated work	Result	Ref.
2016	Discovery of the Year	The Big Short	Nominated	
2017	Film Composer of the Year	Moonlight	Nominated	
2017	Discovery of the Year	Moonlight	Won	
2019	Film Composer of the Year	If Beale Street Could Talk	Won	
2020	Television Composer of the Year	Succession	Won	

== Critics Awards ==
Association	Year	Work	Category	Result	Ref.
ASCAP Film and Television Music Awards	2016	The Big Short	Top Box Office Films	Won	
ASCAP Film and Television Music Awards	2017	Moonlight	Film Score of the Year	Nominated	
ASCAP Film and Television Music Awards	2019	Succession	Television Composer of the Year	Nominated	
ASCAP Film and Television Music Awards	2019	If Beale Street Could Talk	Film Score of the Year	Nominated	
Austin Film Critics Association	2019	If Beale Street Could Talk	Best Score	Nominated	
Awards Circuit Community Awards	2016	Moonlight	Best Original Score	Nominated	
Awards Circuit Community Awards	2019	If Beale Street Could Talk	Best Original Score	Nominated	
Boston Society of Film Critics	2018	If Beale Street Could Talk	Best Original Score	Won	
Central Ohio Film Critics	2017	Moonlight	Best Score	Nominated	
Chicago Film Critics Association	2016	Moonlight	Best Original Score	Nominated	
Chicago Film Critics Association	2018	If Beale Street Could Talk	Best Original Score	Won	
Columbus Film Critics Association	2019	If Beale Street Could Talk	Best Score	Won	
Denver Film Critics Society	2017	Moonlight	Best Original Score	Nominated	
Florida Film Critics Circle Awards	2016	Moonlight	Best Score	Nominated	
Florida Film Critics Circle Awards	2018	If Beale Street Could Talk	Best Score	Nominated	
Georgia Film Critics Association	2017	Moonlight	Best Original Score	Nominated	
Georgia Film Critics Association	2019	If Beale Street Could Talk	Best Original Score	Nominated	
Gold Derby Awards	2017	Moonlight	Best Original Score	Nominated	
Gold Derby Awards	2019	If Beale Street Could Talk	Best Original Score	Nominated	
Gold Derby Awards	2020	If Beale Street Could Talk	Original Score of the Decade	Nominated	
Hawaii Film Critics Society	2017	Moonlight	Best Original Score	Nominated	
Houston Film Critics Society	2017	Moonlight	Best Original Score	Nominated	
Houston Film Critics Society	2019	If Beale Street Could Talk	Best Original Score	Won	
Indiewire Critics' Poll	2016	Moonlight	Best Original Score or Soundtrack	3rd Place	
International Cinephile Society Awards	2019	If Beale Street Could Talk	Best Original Score	Won	
International Film Music Critics Award	2017	Moonlight	Best Original Score for a Drama Film	Nominated	
International Film Music Critics Award	2019	Vice	Best Original Score for a Drama Film	Nominated	
International Film Music Critics Award	2019	If Beale Street Could Talk	Best Original Score for a Drama Film	Nominated	
International Film Music Critics Award	2019	Vice and If Beale Street Could Talk	Film Composer of the Year	Nominated	
International Online Cinema Awards	2017	Moonlight	Best Original Score	Nominated	
International Online Cinema Awards	2019	If Beale Street Could Talk	Best Original Score	Won	
Iowa Film Critics Awards	2019	If Beale Street Could Talk	Best Original Score	Won	
Iowa Film Critics Awards	2017	Moonlight	Best Original Score	Nominated	
Latino Entertainment Journalists Association	2019	If Beale Street Could Talk	Best Music	Won	
London Critics Circle Film Awards	2019	If Beale Street Could Talk	Technical Achievement Award	Nominated	
Los Angeles Film Critics Association Awards	2018	If Beale Street Could Talk	Best Music	Won	
Los Angeles Online Film Critics Society Awards	2018	If Beale Street Could Talk	Best Score	Won	
Music City Film Critics' Association Awards	2019	If Beale Street Could Talk	Best Score	Nominated	
New York Film Critics, Online	2018	If Beale Street Could Talk	Best Use of Music	Won	
North Carolina Film Critics Association	2019	If Beale Street Could Talk	Best Music	Nominated	
Online Film & Television Association	2019	If Beale Street Could Talk	Best Music, Original Score	Won	
Online Film Critics Society Awards	2019	If Beale Street Could Talk	Best Original Score	Won	
Phoenix Critics Circle	2016	Moonlight	Best Original Score	Nominated	
Phoenix Critics Circle	2018	If Beale Street Could Talk	Best Original Score	Won	
San Francisco Bay Area Film Critics Circle	2016	Moonlight	Best Original Score	Nominated	
San Francisco Bay Area Film Critics Circle	2018	If Beale Street Could Talk	Best Original Score	Nominated	
Society of Composers and Lyricists Awards	2020	Succession	Outstanding Original Score for a Television or Streaming Production	Nominated	
St. Louis Film Critics Association	2016	Moonlight	Best Original Score	Nominated	
St. Louis Film Critics Association	2018	If Beale Street Could Talk	Best Original Score	Nominated	
Utah Film Critics Association Awards	2018	If Beale Street Could Talk	Best Original Score	Nominated	
Washington DC Area Film Critics Association Awards	2016	Moonlight	Best Original Score	Nominated	
Washington DC Area Film Critics Association Awards	2018	If Beale Street Could Talk	Best Original Score	Won	
