= Battle of the Sexes (soundtrack) =

2017 film soundtrack album

Battle of the Sexes (Original Motion Picture Soundtrack)

Soundtrack album by Nicholas Britell
- Released: September 22, 2017
- Recorded: 2017
- Genre: Film score; film soundtrack
- Length: 77:38
- Label: Sony Masterworks
- Producer: John Finklea; Nicholas Britell

Nicholas Britell chronology
| Moonlight (2016) | Battle of the Sexes (2017) | If Beale Street Could Talk (2018) |

Battle of the Sexes (Original Motion Picture Soundtrack) is the soundtrack album to the 2017 film Battle of the Sexes directed by Jonathan Dayton and Valerie Faris based on the 1973 tennis match between Billie Jean King and Bobby Riggs, and stars Emma Stone and Steve Carell as King and Riggs. The original score is composed by Nicholas Britell and the album accompanied an original song "If I Dare" performed by Sara Bareilles along with three popular 1970s songs. The album was released through Sony Masterworks on September 22, 2017.

== Development ==
Nicholas Britell noticed about the film's presence at the 43rd Telluride Film Festival in September 2016, where Moonlight (2016) was premiered. At that time, one of his friends wanted samples of his music to be shown to directors, followed by which Dayton and Faris contacted Britell and sent him a rough edit which he liked it. Britell initially found the film as an exciting sports spectacle on a surface level but after dwelling deep into the internal stories of King and Riggs and their personal life, especially their struggles, trials and tribulations, it felt as an interconnected project that had a much deeper understanding on the events happening at that time and that comes to fruition as the title. He considered the film to have a different soundscape from his other ventures and closely worked with the director duo sharing their inputs and ideas back and forth.

One such idea was on writing a classical score with a 1970s rock band instrumentation, using electric guitars, bass and drums, and then strings and woodwinds as he broadened the experimentation, as it worked. By the end, Britell employed a full symphony orchestra in the score. He also added there was an evolution to the music as the film progresses and how the instrumentation expands and reach its apex in the match which intrigued him on how the overall architecture led them to think about the orchestration and instrumental colors. The match sequence was performed by a 79-piece orchestra from the Los Angeles musicians. In order to refrain from the music being to feel functional, Britell decided to weave the personal themes established for King and Riggs for the dramatic moments and had that there were a variety of thematic ideas that occurred in those moments.

Riggs' theme served as a small jazz band that used a small upright piano, double bass, drum kits and woodwinds that provided an intimate and fragile sound that resonated the characters' insecurities, his gambling addiction, and the ups and downs in his career. King's piano theme utilized a Steinway D-274 grand piano reflecting her character as a stronger character. For King's theme, Britell had two different musical ideas: first piece that appeared in the beginning is the competition theme that featured a motif played on a Steinway and that recurred at several key points when Riggs plays with Margaret Court and King realized what she now knows she had to do, as an idea of the fate of the competition coming up and that served as an external theme for King. The second theme was a personal internal theme which occurred during the haircut scene when King meets Marilyn and that served as an ambient soundscape sounding both gentle and delicate and thereby evolved as the relationship between Marilyn and King develops. The same theme recurred during the match, in the end and the moment of the victory. In the match sequences, the theme utilized a solo cello over an orchestra while for the victory moments, the motif was played with a full orchestra.

The music supervisor Steven Baker closely worked with Dayton and Faris. Britell felt that while the soundtrack choices besides being great, also provided an important sense of time. To incorporate the songs into the score, Britell recorded it with vintage microphones treating the audio with analog tape effects to give the texture of that era. The original song "If I Dare" was recorded by Sara Bareilles which Britell considered it to be an exciting collaboration coming together. Britell incorporated some of his thematic ideas into the song.

== Reception ==
Jonathan Broxton of Movie Music UK wrote: "Battle of the Sexes is an excellent score, by far the best work I have yet heard from Nicholas Britell. It's not flashy, not showy, and some might perhaps find it a little on the understated side, but I was impressed with the thematic application, the sympathetic emotional development, and the genuine, authentic 1970s feel." Mark Kermode of The Guardian wrote: "A typically responsive score by Nicholas Britell juxtaposes the driving force of King's game with the anxieties lurking beneath Riggs's brash bravado, lending nuance to a story that seems all the more pertinent in an age in which athletes in America are once again taking action for socio-political change." David Ehrlich of IndieWire called it "a rousing score from Moonlight composer Nicholas Britell".

Caleb Burnett of Set the Tape wrote: "Altogether, Britell does nicely in taking us back to the time period musically. His score, at times, feels classical in nature because of its overall timbre and duration. He musically presents the undercurrent of social life, sexual tension, sports, and love just as well, if not better, than the film does. The cues are short, yet noticeable, drawing viewers in and always leading well into the next scene. Britell's music effectively completes the 1970s atmosphere the filmmakers strove to attain. At the same time, his score goes hand in hand with the sensitive social commentary, trying moments, and triumphant emotions of Battle of the Sexes."

== Track listing ==
| No. | Title | Artist(s) | Length |
|---|---|---|---|
| 1. | "20th Century Fox Fanfare" | Alfred Newman | 0:15 |
| 2. | "Billie Jean King" | | 1:00 |
| 3. | "Bobby Riggs" | | 1:34 |
| 4. | "Manhattan Sunset" | | 2:44 |
| 5. | "Nighthawks" | | 3:16 |
| 6. | "Dog Tennis" | | 2:06 |
| 7. | "Lavender Oil" | | 2:07 |
| 8. | "One Dollar – Press Conference" | | 1:00 |
| 9. | "Radio Interview" (Anthem) | | 2:11 |
| 10. | "First Kiss" | | 2:14 |
| 11. | "Crimson and Clover" | Tommy James and the Shondells | 3:27 |
| 12. | "Marilyn Joins the Tour" | | 1:57 |
| 13. | "Rocket Man (I Think It's Going to Be a Long, Long Time)" | Elton John | 4:41 |
| 14. | "The Bra / Court Loss" | | 4:36 |
| 15. | "Bobby vs. Margaret" | | 4:38 |
| 16. | "The Winner" | | 1:46 |
| 17. | "Priscilla Leaves" | | 2:00 |
| 18. | "What Is Life" | George Harrison | 4:21 |
| 19. | "Prelude to Battle of the Sexes" | | 9:02 |
| 20. | "Battle of the Sexes – March" | | 1:59 |
| 21. | "The Battle of the Sexes – Match Part 1" | | 8:41 |
| 22. | "The Battle of the Sexes – Match Part 2" | | 1:58 |
| 23. | "Victory" | | 2:19 |
| 24. | "Finale" | | 2:53 |
| 25. | "Postlude" | | 1:05 |
| 26. | "If I Dare" | Sara Bareilles | 3:48 |
| Total length: | | | 77:38 |

== Personnel ==
Credits adapted from liner notes:

- Music composer – Nicholas Britell
- Music producer – John Finklea, Nicholas Britell
- Recording and mixing – Dennis Sands
- Mastering – Patricia Sullivan
- Music supervisor – Steven Baker
- Music editor – John Finklea
- Booklet editor and design – WLP Ltd.

Management

- Music clearance for 20th Century Fox – Ellen Ginsburg
- Music clearance for Sony – Chris Robertson
- Licensing for Sony – Mark Cavell
- Music business affairs for 20th Century Fox – Tom Cavanaugh
- Executive in charge of music for 20th Century Fox – Danielle Diego
- Music management for 20th Century Fox – Areli Quirarte
- Soundtrack coordination for 20th Century Fox – Joann Orgel
- Product development for Sony – Klara Korytowska
- Music production supervision for 20th Century Fox – Rebecca Morellato
- Music supervision for 20th Century Fox – Patrick Houlihan

Instruments

- Band – Bernie Dresel, Chuck Berghofer, Freddie Washington Jr., George Doering, Nicholas Britell
- Bassoon – Damian Montano, Kenneth Munday, Rose Corrigan, Samantha Duckworth
- Cello – Armen Ksajikian, Caitlin Sullivan, Dennis Karmazyn, Erika Duke-Kirkpatrick, Evgeny Tonkha, Giovanna Clayton, Jacob Braun, Paula Hochhalter, Simone Vitucci, Steve Erdody, Timothy Loo, Trevor Handy, Xiaodan Altenbach
- Clarinet – Donald Foster, Joshua Ranz, Ralph Williams, Stuart Clark
- Contrabass – Drew Dembowski, Gabriel Golden, Geoffrey Osika, Michael Valerio, Nico Carmine Abondolo, Stephen Dress
- Flute – Geri Rotella, Heather Clark, Jennifer Olson, Julie Burkett
- Guitar – George Doering, Rob Moose
- Horn – Allen Fogle, Amy Sanchez, Dylan Hart, John E. Mason, Katelyn Faraudo, Mark Adams
- Oboe – Jessica Pearlman, Lara Wickes, Michele Forrest
- Percussion – Edward Atkatz, Kenneth McGrath, Wade Culbreath
- Trombone – Alexander Iles, William Reichenbach, Phillip Keen
- Trumpet – Barry Perkins, Jon Lewis
- Tuba – Doug Tornquist
- Viola – Andrew Duckles, Brian Dembow, Darrin McCann, David Walther, Jerome Gordon, Luke Maurer, Matthew Funes, Meredith Crawford, Pamela Jacobson, Robert Brophy, Shawn Mann, Thomas Diener, Victoria Miskolczy, Victor De Almeida
- Violin – Alyssa Park, Belinda Broughton, Benjamin Powell, Bruce Dukov, Charlie Brisharat, Darius Campo, Erik Ervidner, Eun-Mee Ahn, Grace Oh, Helen Nightengale, Jacqueline Brand, Jessica Guideri, Joel Pargman, Josefina Vergara, Julie Gigante, Katie Sloan, Kevin Connolly, Lisa Liu, Lucia Micarelli, Maya Magub, Natalie Leggett, Neil Samples, Phillip Levy, Serena McKinney, Songa Lee, Stephanie Matthews, Tamara Hatwan, Tim Fain, Yelena Yegoryan

== Accolades ==
| Award | Date of ceremony | Category | Recipient(s) | Result | Ref. |
|---|---|---|---|---|---|
| Hollywood Music in Media Awards | November 16, 2017 | Original Score – Feature Film | Nicholas Britell | Nominated | |
| Hollywood Music in Media Awards | November 16, 2017 | Original Song – Feature Film | "If I Dare" – Sara Bareilles | Nominated | |
