= 12th Hollywood Music in Media Awards =

US film music awards ceremony in 2021

- Date: November 17, 2021
- Location: Virtual
- Website: www.hmmawards.com

The 12th Hollywood Music in Media Awards were held on November 17, 2021 to recognize the best in music in film, TV, video games, commercials, and trailers. The nominations were announced on November 4, 2021. A new category named "Outstanding On-Screen Performance in a Film" was introduced.

== Winners and nominees ==
=== Score ===
| Original Score — Feature Film | Original Score — Independent Film |
|---|---|
| Don’t Look Up – Nicholas Britell; King Richard – Kris Bowers; Nightmare Alley – Nathan Johnson; No Time to Die – Hans Zimmer; Stillwater – Mychael Danna; The French Dispatch – Alexandre Desplat; The Last Duel – Harry Gregson-Williams; The Power of the Dog – Jonny Greenwood | C'mon C'mon – Bryce Dessner and Aaron Dessner; CODA – Marius de Vries; Nine Days – Antônio Pinto; The Card Counter – Robert Levon Been and Giancarlo Vulcano; The Green Knight – Daniel Hart; The Tragedy of Macbeth – Carter Burwell |
| Original Score — Animated Film | Original Score — Sci-Fi/Fantasy Film |
| The Addams Family 2 – Mychael Danna and Jeff Danna; Spirit Untamed – Amie Doherty; The Loud House Movie – Philip White; Vivo – Alex Lacamoire; Luca – Dan Romer; The Mitchells vs. the Machines – Mark Mothersbaugh | Dune – Hans Zimmer; Black Widow – Lorne Balfe; Cinderella – Mychael Danna & Jessica Rose Weiss; Shang-Chi and the Legend of the Ten Rings – Joel P. West; The Suicide Squad – John Murphy |
| Original Score — Horror Film | Original Score — Documentary |
| A Quiet Place Part II – Marco Beltrami; Army of the Dead – Tom Holkenborg; IN THE EⱯRTH – Clint Mansell; Last Night in Soho – Steven Price; Old – Trevor Gureckis | Julia – Rachel Portman; 14 Peaks: Nothing Is Impossible – Nainita Desai; Becoming Cousteau – Daniel Bensi and Saunder Jurriaans; Operation Varsity Blues: The College Admissions Scandal – Leopold Ross, Nick Chuba, Atticus Ross; Oslo – Jeff Russo and Zoë Keating; Strip Down, Rise Up – Lili Haydn; The Rescue – Daniel Pemberton |
| Original Score — Independent Film (Foreign Language) | Original Score — TV Show/Limited Series |
| Parallel Mothers – Alberto Iglesias; A Cross in the Dessert – Ana Krstajic; Beneath the Banyan Tree – Wei-San Hsu; Blast Beat – David Murillo R.; El Hoyo en la Cerca – Kyle Dixon and Michael Stein | Squid Game – Jung Jae-il; Halston – Nathan Barr; Loki – Natalie Holt; The Morning Show – Carter Burwell; Maid – Chris Stracey and Este Haim; Physical – Isabella Summers; Who Killed Sara? – David Murillo; Ted Lasso – Marcus Mumford and Tom Howe; WandaVision – Christophe Beck |
| Original Score — Short Film (Animated) | Original Score — Short Film (Documentary) |
| Blush – Joy Ngiaw; Descendants: The Royal Wedding – Arturo Cardelús; I Remember – Min He; Tales of Runeterra: Ionia: "The Lesson" – Jerome Leroy; Together – Nora Kroll-Rosenbaum | Audible – Jackson Greenberg; Camp Confidential: America's Secret Nazis – Antônio Pinto & Eduardo Aram; Carlotta Lanier: A Civil Rights Pioneer Since Age 14 – Lisa Downing; Endless Beauty – Christian Heschl; In Monet's Footsteps with Dean & Dudley Evenson – Dean & Dudley Evenson; My Heroes Were Cowboys – Alex Schiff & Emile Mosseri; Additional Music: David Baldwin |
| Original Score — Video Game | Original Song/Score — Mobile Video Game |
| Ratchet & Clank: Rift Apart – Mark Mothersbaugh and Wataru Hokoyama; Battlefield 2042 – Hildur Guðnadóttir and Sam Slater; New World – Ramin Djawadi and Brandon Campbell; Rogue Lords – Laurent Courbier; The Medium – Arkadiusz Reikowski and Akira Yamaoka | Arena of Valor 4.0 – Written by Yang Lee; Performed by Budapest Scoring Symphony Orchestra; Free Fire – Written by Ludvig Forssell; Performed by Tokyo Studio Symphony; Call of Duty: Mobile – Written by Audiomachine; Performed by Budapest File Orchestra; Onmyōji – Written by Ma-Lin, Chian, and lyrics by Elena Westermann; Performed by 2WEI & Elena Westermann; PUGB Mobile - The Growth – Written by Obadiah Brown-Beach and Substantial; Vocals by Substantial; Tomb Raider Reloaded – Written by Benjamin Beladi & Carl Vaudrin. Tina Guo (solo cello); Featuring Tomb Raider theme by Nathan McCree, Orchestration: Benoit Groulx, Benjamin Beladi, Carl Vaudrin; Additional music: Benjamin Botkin |

=== Song ===
| Original Song — Feature Film | Original Song — Independent Film |
|---|---|
| "No Time to Die" from No Time to Die – Written by Billie Eilish and Finneas O'Connell; Performed by Billie Eilish; "Be Alive" from King Richard – Written by DIXSON and Beyoncé Knowles-Carter; Performed by Beyoncé; "Every Letter" from Cyrano – Written by Aaron Dessner and Bryce Dessner, Matt Berninger and Carin Besser; Performed by Peter Dinklage, Haley Bennett and Kelvin Harrison Jr.; "Guns Go Bang" from The Harder They Fall – Written by Jeymes Samuel, Scott Mescudi and Shawn Carter; Performed by Kid Cudi and Jay-Z; "Here I Am (Singing My Way Home)" from Respect – Written by Carole King, Jennifer Hudson and Jamie Hartman, Performed by Jennifer Hudson; "Just Look Up" from Don't Look Up – Written by Nicholas Britell, Ariana Grande, Scott Mescudi and Taura Stinson; Performed by Ariana Grande and Kid Cudi; "My Father's Daughter" from Flag Day – Written by Glen Hansard and Eddie Vedder; Performed by Olivia Vedder | "Beyond the Shore" from CODA – Written by Nick Baxter, Siân Heder, Marius de Vries, Matt Dahan; Performed by Emilia Jones; "After Our Dawn" from After We Fell – Written by George Kallis, Castille Landon, Nicolas Farmakalidis, Ryan Steffes, George Solonos and Taylor Conrod; Performed by Taylor Conrod; "Because Love" from Love Is Love Is Love – Written by Rita Wilson and Laura Karpman; Performed by Rita Wilson; "Down to Joy" from Belfast – Written and performed by Van Morrison; "Somehow You Do" from Four Good Days – Written by Diane Warren; Performed by Reba McEntire |
| Original Song — Animated Film | Original Song — Documentary |
| "Good Mood" from PAW Patrol: The Movie – Written by Karl Johan Schuster, Savan Kotecha, Oscar Görres and Adam Levine; Performed by Adam Levine; "Fearless (Valiente)" from Spirit Untamed – Written by Amie Doherty; Performed by Isabela Merced and Eiza González; "Follow Me Home" from Arlo the Alligator Boy – Written By Ryan Crego and Alex Geringas; Performed by Mary Lambert and Michael J. Woodard; "On My Way" from The Mitchells vs. the Machines – Written by Alex Lahey, Sophie Payten and Gab Strum; Produced by Gab Strum with Alex Lahey; Performed by Alex Lahey; "Together We Stand" from The Boss Baby: Family Business – Written by Gary Barlow; Performed by Ariana Greenblatt; "Your Song Saved My Life" from Sing 2 – Written by Bono; Performed by U2 | "Secret Sister" from Rebel Hearts – Written and performed by Rufus Wainwright; "Breathe" from The First Wave – Wrtitten and performed by Jon Batiste; "Looking Up" from World Woman Hour – Written by Ryan Shore & Elizabeth Russo; Performed by Angelica Hale; "(Never Gonna) Tame You" from The Mustangs: America's Wild Horses – Written by Diane Warren; Performed by Blanco Brown; "Right Where I Belong" from Brian Wilson: Long Promised Road – Written by Brian Wilson and Jim James; Performed by Brian Wilson; "The Other Side of the Rainbow" from Cured – Written by Ian Honeyman and Tucker Murray Caploe; Performed by TUCKER and Ian Honeyman |
| Original Song — TV Show/Limited Series | Original Song — Video Game |
| "Change" from We Are People – Written by H.E.R., Maxx Moore, David Harris, Ronald Colson and Jeff Gitelman; Performed by H.E.R.; "Neck of the Woods" from Trying – Written by Maisie Peters and Joe Rubel; Performed by Maisie Peters; "Together All the Way" from Dear White People – Written by Kris Bowers and Siedah Garrett, Performed by Cast; "Welcome to the Internet" from Bo Burnham: Inside – Written and performed by Bo Burnham | "Burn It All Down" from League of Legends – Written by Riot Music Team and Alex Seaver of Mako; Performed by PVRIS; "Limitless" (feat. Matilda Stray and Omega Sparx)" from Quantaar – Written by Emperia Sound, Cody Matthew Johnson and Voicians; Performed by Matilda Stray and Omega Sparx; "I Want to Live" from Baldur's Gate III – Written by Borislav Slavov; Performed by Borislav Slavov and Ilona Ivanova; "Infinity" from Eve Echoes – Written by Jared Benson; Performed by Tahira Schäfer, Hannes Porombka, Leon Würschinger, Frederic Michel, Jacob StocK; "Déjà Vu" from Deathloop – Written and performed by Sencit featuring FJØRA; "In the Darkness" from Life Is Strange: True Colors – Written and performed by mxmtoon |
| Original Song/Score — Commercial Advertisement | Original Song — Short Film |
| "Everything I Do Gohn Be Funky (From Now On)" (New Orleans Jaz & Heriyage Fondation - Rise and Shine) – Written by Allen Toussaint, arranged by Found Objects; Performed by Troy Andrews, Nadav Nirenberg, Julian Gosin, Roger Lewis, Chauncey Yearwood, Gabe Medd, Evan Margulies, Nora Nalepka and Morgan Price; "The Irrepressible Girl" (Vodafone) – Written by Walter Mair, solo cello performed by Tina Guo; "Strangers" (Life in a Day 2020: Strangers on the Road) – Written by The Kinks. Performed by Black Pumas & Lucius; "La Grossa de St Jordi" (La Grossa de St Jordi) – Written and performed by Ivan Capillas; "Everyday Hero" (Glame - No Choice) – Written and performed by Karsten Laser and Mateia Gerner | "Headnoise" from Headnoise – Written by Tone, Ashley Jones, and Matthew Wang; "Sneak Song" from Robin Robin – Written by Mikey Please and Ojari; Performed by The Bookshop Band; "Vracam Se Doma" from Sabina:Prey for the Hunter – Written by Jon Altham, Marcus T. Thomas, Nicole Starrett, Nina Kraljic; Performed by Jon Altham & Nina Kraljic; "Jugaste con Fuego" from Servicio de Mensajería – Written and performed by J. M. Quintana Cámara and Paula Gómez; "Eyes Wide Open" from North Star – Written by Blanco White & Jon Altham; Performed by Blanco White |
Original Song – Onscreen Performance
Emilia Jones – "Both Sides Now" from CODA; Written by Joni Mitchell; Amandla Stenberg – "The Anonymous Ones" from Dear Evan Hansen; Written by Benj Pasek, Justin Paul and Amandla Stenberg; Anthony Ramos and Leslie Grace featuring Marc Anthony – "Home All Summer" from In the Heights; Written by Lin-Manuel Miranda; Anya Taylor-Joy – "Downtown" from Last Night in Soho; Written by Tony Hatch; Ariana Grande and Kid Cudi – "Just Look Up" from Don't Look Up; Written by Nicholas Britell, Ariana Grande, Scott Mescudi and Taura Stinson; Glen Hansard, Sam Amidon, Scott Folan & Chorus – "Whenever I Fall" from Cyrano; Written by Aaron Dessner, Bryce Dessner, Matt Berninger and Carin Besser; Jennifer Hudson, Hailey Kilgore & Saycon Sengbloh – "Respect" from Respect; Written by Otis Redding

=== Music Supervision ===
| Music Supervision — Film | Music Supervision — Television |
|---|---|
| Tracy McKnight – Flag Day; Alex Patsavas – CODA; Jason Markey – Queenpins; Linda Cohen – Licorice Pizza; Mike Knobloch and Rachel Levy – Sing 2; Randall Poster – The Velvet Underground | Tony Von Pervieux and Christa Miller – Ted Lasso; Amani "Burt Blackarach" Smith – The Wonder Years; Derryck “Big Tank” Thornton – BMF; Jonathan Leahy – Heels; Jonathan Mchugh – Blindspotting; Stephanie Diaz-Matos – Godfather of Harlem |

=== Other ===
| Music Documentary/Special Program | Educational/Entertainment Exhibits or Theme Park Rides |
|---|---|
| The Sparks Brothers – Produced by George Hencken, Nira Park and Laura Richardson; Directed by Edgar Wright; Biggie I Got a Story to Tell – Produced by Voletta Wallace, Stanley F. Buchthal, Sean 'Diddy' Combs, Mark Pitts, Josh Braun, Emmett Malloy, Dan Braun and Brendan Malloy; Directed by Emmett Malloy; Billie Eilish: The World's a Little Blurry – Produced by R. J. Cutler, Trevor Smith, Michelle An, Chelsea Dodson and Anthony Seyler; Directed by R. J. Cutler; Brian Wilson: Long Promised Road – Produced by Jason Fine, Melinda Ledbetter, Brian Wilson, Gloria Coronado-Myatt and Ayanna Hart; Directed by Brent Wilson; Mary J. Blige's My Life – Produced by Mary J. Blige, Sean 'Diddy' Combs, Mark Ford, Tara Long and Kevin Lopez; Directed by Vanessa Roth; Pink: All I Know So Far – Produced by Hoyt Dane, Roger Davies, Tom Pellegrini and Pink; Directed by Michael Gracey | Signs of Life (Griffith Observatory Exhibit) – Dan Radlauer, Alan Ett, Scott Liggett; EXPO2020 Dubai, Poland - Landscapes of Creativity (Exhibition) – Tomasz Opalka; Kung Fu Panda Land of Awesomeness (Theme Park Ride) – Germaine Franco; The Secret Life of Pets: Off the Leash (Theme Park Ride) – Jake Monaco; Tikal Night of the Bloodmoon (TrueVR Experience) – Jakob Eisenbach |
| Main Title Theme — TV Show/Limited Series | Main Title Theme — TV Show (Foreign Language) |
| The Wonder Years – Roahn Hylton, Jacob Yoffee and Scotty Granger; Allen v. Farrow – Michael Abels; BMF – Curtis "50 Cent" Jackson featuring Charlie Wilson; Heels – Ben Bridwell and Jeff Cardoni; Schmigadoon! – Cinco Paul; Yasuke – Flying Lotus and Thundercat | Who Killed Sara? – David Murillo R.; Aliah's Sky – Ibrahim Shamel; Apartment 6 – Ashraf Elziftawi; Khally Balak Men Zizi – Khaled Al Kammar; Nebaidies Ne No Ka – Rihards Zalupe; Squid Game – Jung Jae-il |
| Music Video (Independent) | Live Concert for Visual Media |
| Abstract Mindstate ("A Wise Tale") – Written and performed by Abstract Mindstate; Directed by Neesin; Abbie Thomas ("Fireflies") – Written and performed by Abbie Thomas; Directed by David Perkins; Alexander James Rodriguez ("Cherry Bomb") – Written & performed by Alexander James Rodriguez, Directed by Liz Rodriguez and Brian Jara; Anna K Steiner ("No Regrets") – Written by Anna K Steiner, Dawn Elder, Bob Malone; Performed by Anna K Steiner; Directed by Jake Van Asten and Dawn Elder; April Rose Gabrielli ("Do You?") – Written by April Rose Gabrielli, Kulick & Kevin Eiserman; Performed by April Rose Gabrielli; Balqees ("Diplomacy") – Written by Aziz Al Shafaei; Performed by Balqees; Directed Ali Abotaleb; BEE Uyen Phuong ("Tears") – Written and performed by BEE Uyen Phuong; Directed by Landon Donoho; El-Jay Ft. LA Buck ("I'm That Winner") – Written by Chazz Conley, George Lemore; Performed by El-Jay Ft. LA Buck; Directed by Cobra Cutz; Heather Fay ("The One") – Written and performed by Heather Fay; Kara Connolly ("Something More") – Written by Kara Connolly and Dan Sadin; Performed by Kara Connolly; Directed by Marco Bottiglieri | Bo Burnham: Inside – Bo Burnham; Arknights: Ambience Synesthesia 2021 – Hypergryph; Dolly Parton: A Musicares Tribute – Dolly Parton & Various Artists; Emicida: Amarelo - Live in Sao Paulo – Emicida; Global Citizen Festival – Billie Eilish |
