= Look Up =

Look Up may refer to:

- Look Up (song), a song by Daley
- Look Up (Bob Neuwirth album), 1996
- Look Up (Mod Sun album), 2015
- Look Up (Ringo Starr album), 2025

== See also ==
- Don't Look Up
- Up (disambiguation)
