= If Beale Street Could Talk (soundtrack) =

If Beale Street Could Talk (Original Motion Picture Score)

Film score by Nicholas Britell
- Released: November 9, 2018
- Genre: Film score
- Length: 53:20
- Label: Lakeshore
- Producer: Nicholas Britell

Nicholas Britell chronology
Battle of the Sexes (2017)	If Beale Street Could Talk (2018)	Vice (2018)

If Beale Street Could Talk (Original Motion Picture Score) is the score album to the 2018 film of the same name directed by Barry Jenkins based on James Baldwin's 1974 novel of the same name. Featuring original music written and composed by Nicholas Britell, the film marked his second collaboration with Jenkins after the Academy Award-winning Moonlight (2016). According to Britell, he used two different soundscapes to depict the relationship between Clementine "Tish" Rivers (KiKi Layne) and Alonzo "Fonny" Hunt (Stephan James) as well as the horrors of alleged accusation over Fonny, and the aftermath surrounds. The primary instruments used in most of the scores, were strings and brass to depict the relationship, while orchestra and jazz also accompany the score.

The score album was released on November 9, 2018, by Lakeshore Records and received positive response from critics, praising the instrumentation, composition and musical soundscape. Britell received the Academy Award nomination for Best Original Score and BAFTA Award for Best Original Music, losing the respective awards to Ludwig Göransson's score for Black Panther and Bradley Cooper, Lady Gaga, and Lukas Nelson for A Star Is Born. However, Britell received the Black Reel Award for Outstanding Score, and was similarly successful at critics' award ceremonies, The album was issued in double vinyl by Lakeshore Records and Invada Records on March 15, 2019.

== Composition ==
The score is a combination of brass, strings and orchestra. When the music for the film was first written, Jenkins said that he wanted the sounds of brass and horns, that was the "first intuitive idea of a feeling". Later, he assembled the sounds of trumpet, flügelhorn, cornet and French horns, and mixed it for the first piece he had written. But felt that the score missed strings in the musical landscape, as for Britell, the strings became like a "musical exploration or expression of love" adding that "What's remarkable about the way Jenkins made the film is that it explores so many different kinds of love. It explores the love of parents for their children, it explores romantic love, it explores this divine, pure kind of love that exists between people. The strings came to symbolize that for us in a lot of ways."

"I think the orchestration of things—the instrumental combinations, the sound colors and how they all combine—is essential to the process of composition. For me, the notes and the instruments that they'll be played on are completely linked. A piece played on brass and [the same] piece played on strings feels like different piece. There were actually pieces that I wrote early on for brass, which are not in the movie. [There was] a piece that I showed to Barry where we felt something was missing; the chords and the melody are throughout the film, but that piece itself is not in the movie. So there was a lot of music that served as a mold, a catalyst for us to find other things that actually worked best. [In terms of] the sound colors, there's a lot of cello, a lot of bass. As opposed to Moonlight, where the violin was featured, there's almost no violin in Beale Street at all. When the music goes into those upper reaches in this film, it's brass, and that was a very conscious choice."

— Nicholas Britell, on the instrumentation and composition of the film's score.

Britell felt that he could chop and screw classical music like he did the same for hip hop in the score of Moonlight (2016). He had the strings and brass were included to write the score in a classical way, but at times, jazz harmonies as included in the score, as "music is incredibly fluid space, and sometimes the labels create boundaries that aren't really there", thereby enticing to blend multiple genres in several ways, to create an atmospheric sounding. While composing the score, he had explained about the tuning and mixing of the score, saying: "There are few key cues where the cornet is muted. I find it totally fascinating how subtle changes in the way an instrument is played—putting a mute on an instrument, or taking it off—can completely change the things that it associates to, in your mind and in your ear. When I hear that muted cornet, that to me sounds very much like mid-century jazz, right away. At the same time, I was exploring these colors with a mixture of French horn, and trumpet and flugelhorn, even [with regard to] where they sit in the register. If you put certain instruments above others in the way that they're layered, you're painting with different colors, and there's this infinite palette of possibilities. I love having the opportunity to explore these colors because each film is a different kind of creative adventure where you get to learn about different sounds."

== Track listing ==
No.	Title	Length
1.	"Eden (Harlem)"	2:54
2.	"The Children of Our Age"	1:31
3.	"Agape"	2:55
4.	"Encomium"	2:27
5.	"Eros"	3:15
6.	"Mrs. Victoria Rogers"	1:43
7.	"Call Him Fonny / The Tombs / PTSD"	4:36
8.	"Jezebel"	2:08
9.	"Eden (LES)"	2:30
10.	"Keepers of the Keys and Seals"	2:04
11.	"Hypertension"	2:19
12.	"P.B.A."	1:50
13.	"Storge"	2:09
14.	"Mama Gets to Puerto Rico"	2:56
15.	"Ye Who Enter Here"	2:53
16.	"Requiem"	1:54
17.	"Philia"	2:17
18.	"If Beale Street Could Talk (End Credits)"	1:42
19.	"Harlem Aria (Bonus Track)"	1:27
20.	"This Is Where My Life Is (Bonus Track)"	2:17
21.	"New Life (Bonus Track)"	1:22
22.	"What Have They Done? (Bonus Track)"	1:15
23.	"A Rose in Spanish Harlem (Bonus Track)"	2:56
Total length:		53:20

== Reception ==
James Southall of Movie Wave wrote "Virtually throughout there is this very yearning, affectionate quality to it – the film is after all ultimately a love story, albeit not one without real challenge – and it has a very personal, moving quality. It's not sweeping romance in the John Barry sense – it's much smaller-scale in terms of the orchestral forces, most obviously – and while you could say it's somewhat repetitive on the album, the darker moments do provide the offset that is so often so powerful in strengthening the impact of the emotional material. There is a clarity to the orchestration (even if it is not entirely conventional) and also the performance and recording which gives the album a certain raw directness which is very impressive." Jonathan Broxton had a mixed opinion on the score, saying that "parts of the score appealing on a number of levels. But there is still an inexplicable something about the score which keeps It from clicking, whether it's the repetitiveness, or the lack of development, or the way in which so many of the musical ideas seem to clash, to the emotional detriment of the whole experience." It has been complimented by film critics as "one of the best scores of 2018" by publications such as IndieWire, Vulture, and Film School Rejects along with Britell's Vice.

== Accolades ==
Award	Date of ceremony	Category	Recipient(s)	Result	Ref(s)
Academy Awards	February 24, 2019	Best Original Score	Nicholas Britell	Nominated	
Austin Film Critics Association	January 7, 2019	Best Original Score	Nicholas Britell	Nominated	
Black Reel Awards	February 7, 2019	Outstanding Score	Nicholas Britell	Won	
Boston Society of Film Critics	December 16, 2018	Best Score	Nicholas Britell	Won	
British Academy Film Awards	February 10, 2019	Best Original Music	Nicholas Britell	Nominated	
Chicago Film Critics Association	December 8, 2018	Best Original Score	Nicholas Britell	Won	
Critics' Choice Movie Awards	January 13, 2019	Best Original Score	Nicholas Britell	Nominated	
Florida Film Critics Circle	December 21, 2018	Best Score	Nicholas Britell	Runner-up	
Georgia Film Critics Association	December 1, 2018	Best Original Score	Nicholas Britell	Nominated	
Hollywood Music in Media Awards	November 14, 2018	Best Original Score – Feature Film	Nicholas Britell	Nominated	
Houston Film Critics Society	January 3, 2019	Best Original Score	Nicholas Britell	Won	
International Cinephile Society	February 4, 2019	Best Original Score	Nicholas Britell	Won	
London Film Critics' Circle	January 20, 2019	Technical Achievement of the Year	Nicholas Britell (Music)	Nominated	
Los Angeles Film Critics Association	December 9, 2018	Best Use of Music/Score	Nicholas Britell	Won	
New York Film Critics Online	December 9, 2018	Best Use of Music	Nicholas Britell	Won	
Online Film Critics Society	January 2, 2019	Best Original Score	Nicholas Britell	Won	
San Francisco Film Critics Circle Awards	December 9, 2018	Best Original Score	Nicholas Britell	Nominated	
Satellite Awards	February 17, 2019	Best Original Score	Nicholas Britell	Nominated	
Seattle Film Critics Society	December 17, 2018	Best Original Score	Nicholas Britell	Nominated	
St. Louis Film Critics Association	December 16, 2018	Best Score	Nicholas Britell	Nominated	
Washington D.C. Area Film Critics Association	December 3, 2018	Best Score	Nicholas Britell	Won	
World Soundtrack Awards	October 18, 2019	Film Composer of the Year	Nicholas Britell	Won	
