= Moonlight (soundtrack) =

Moonlight (Original Motion Picture Soundtrack)

Soundtrack album by Nicholas Britell
- Released: October 21, 2016
- Studio: 2015–2016
- Genres: Classical; Southern hip hop
- Length: 38:04
- Label: Lakeshore
- Producer: Nicholas Britell

Nicholas Britell chronology
Free State of Jones (2016)	Moonlight (2016)	Battle of the Sexes (2017)

Moonlight (Original Motion Picture Soundtrack) is the soundtrack to the 2016 film of the same name directed by Barry Jenkins. The film's original score is composed by Nicholas Britell who applied a chopped and screwed technique of hip hop remixes to orchestral music, producing a "fluid, bass-heavy score". The soundtrack album consisted of 21 tracks, with incorporated compositions from Goodie Mob, Boris Gardiner and Barbara Lewis and an arrangement of Wolfgang Amadeus Mozart's "Vesperae solennes de confessore" by Britell, with the score accompanying the remainder of it.

Lakeshore Records released the film's soundtrack digitally on October 21, 2016 and in physical formats on November 25, 2016, with the vinyl edition of the album, being released on February 17, 2017. The score received positive critical acclaim praising Britell's composition and the chopped and screwed musical technique. The score received nominations for "Best Original Score" category in the Academy Awards, Critics' Choice Movie Awards, Golden Globe Awards and other ceremonies, but lost all of them to Justin Hurwitz for La La Land. However, Britell won the Black Reel Award for Outstanding Original Score and Hollywood Music in Media Award for Best Original Score in a Feature Film.

== Background ==
The original score is composed by Nicholas Britell, marking the beginning of a collaboration with Jenkins. Plan B Entertainment, co-producer Jeremy Kleiner approached Britell with a script for reading, which he felt as "incredibly beautiful" and "completely overwhelmed" agreeing to contribute to the music. He added "the film felt like poetry, it was so beautiful and tender".

== Recording and production ==
The score is an alteration of minimal instrumentation and sounds from full chamber orchestra. His initial musical instincts were to have "sensitivity, tenderness and intimacy", and adding a counterpoint is the idea of chopped and screwed music, a type of Southern hip hop genre where songs are bent and pitched and slowed down and become "fascinating morphed versions of themselves that are deepened and enriched". This technique is mainly to slow down the tempo between 60-70 quarter-note beats that, when repeated in a measure, creates a "choppy" effect. The recordings he scored where manipulated with the Ableton Live software, where he would play with octaves and tone and layered them to achieve that sound.

"It was a multi-part compositional process, where I would write pieces of music, we'd record the music fully with instruments, then we started the next part of the process, where I slowed the pieces and manipulated some of the audio sounds with bending and morphing as well [...] It became a concept we employed throughout the film. As the music evolves and develops, the bending and morphing evolve as well. And in some cases, there are moments where 'Chiron's Theme' appears quietly in B major and then over the course of the film modulates down. And the pitch actually goes down in crazy ways during a schoolyard fight, where the music rumbles in the sub woofers. It's the same piece of music with three octaves down."

— Nicholas Britell, on chopping and screwing instruments for Chiron's theme.

As the film is divided into three chapters of Chiron's life, the score itself depict the character's growth with the progressive community. He first began with "Chiron's Theme" where he chopped and screwed piano alternates between major and minor chords, with spare violin acting as counterpoint, which led Britell call it as "Piano and Violin Poem". The theme was then morphed into cellos, when Chiron reunites with his childhood friend Kevin (André Holland). In contrast, the score for "The Middle of the World" is played when a young Chiron is taught to swim by Juan (Mahershala Ali), a sensitive drug-dealer who becomes his father-figure. This provoked him to write the main theme for the film. In a sequence, where Chiron and Kevin slap hands in a high-five before tragedy separates them, Britell used the sonic element to create a percussion tapestry, which was "a fascinating exploration of what happens to the pieces after they've been woven into a sonic landscape".

== Cover artwork ==
The soundtrack album to Moonlight featured cover art designed by John Bergin, The original edition has a still of Trevante Rhodes, Ashton Sanders and Alex Hibbert as Chiron, split in three sides of the cover, and primary colors include blue, violet and indigo. The second album for the vinyl edition has a still of Sanders' facing the left side of the background.

== Release ==
Lakeshore Records distributed the Moonlight soundtrack in digital formats on October 21, 2016, the same day as the film's release, and in physical formats on November 25. The album was released in vinyl on February 17, 2017. The album was released in the United Kingdom by Invada Records on June 2, 2017 in digital CD and vinyl editions. In Taiwan, the album was published by Noble Music and Lakeshore on April 13, 2017. Rambling Records released the album in Japan on April 7, 2017. Two repressed editions of the album were released in 2019 and 2020.

== Live performance ==
Britell performed the score live at the Million Dollar Theater in Los Angeles on January 10, 2017, where a special screening of the film was held. Wordless Music Orchestra performed the score at the stage with Britell conducting, and will also receive a copy of the film's soundtrack in physical form by A24. On the live performance, Britell felt "incredibly excited" and also added that he would re-record the complex soundscapes and audio textures and use "a variety of techniques (including real-time pitch shifting) to recreate the chopped and screwed music recorded in the studio".

== Track listing ==
Moonlight (Original Motion Picture Soundtrack)
No.	Title	Artist	Length
1.	"Every N****a Is a Star"	Boris Gardiner	3:19
2.	"Little's Theme"	Nicholas Britell	0:59
3.	"Ride Home"	Britell	0:47
4.	"Vesperae solennes de confessore – Laudate dominum, K. 339 (Excerpt)" (Wolfgang Amadeus Mozart)	Britell	1:42
5.	"The Middle of the World"	Britell	2:02
6.	"The Spot"	Britell	1:23
7.	"Interlude"	Britell	0:25
8.	"Chiron's Theme"	Britell	0:56
9.	"Metrorail Closing"	Britell	1:42
10.	"Chiron's Theme Chopped & Screwed (Knock Down Stay Down)"	Britell	2:08
11.	"You Don't Even Know"	Britell	2:20
12.	"Don't Look at Me"	Britell	0:36
13.	"Cell Therapy"	Goodie Mob	4:37
14.	"Atlanta Ain't but so Big"	Britell	0:55
15.	"Sweet Dreams"	Britell	0:58
16.	"Chef's Special"	Britell	1:10
17.	"Hello Stranger"	Barbara Lewis	2:43
18.	"Black's Theme"	Britell	0:56
19.	"Who Is You?"	Britell	0:53
20.	"End Credits Suite"	Britell	5:13
21.	"Bonus Track: The Culmination"	Britell	1:55

== Reception ==
Giving a score 7.7 out of 10, Calum Marsh of Pitchfork reviewed "Nicholas Britell composed a score that splits the difference between classical and codeine". About the chopped and screwed technique for the score, Marsh explained "Moonlight is all about slowing things down: it's about how identities are made, how appearances are cultivated, and how if we stop for a moment the difference between who we're trying to be and who we are becomes obvious. The clash in styles lays bare these themes so compellingly. It's real life chopped and screwed." Writing for Drowned in Sound, Adam Turner-Heffer gave a score of 8 out 10 and commented "Britell's soundtrack is every bit as unnerving and beautiful as the film it colours and is well worth exploring as a wonderful piece of contemporary music, as well as cinema." Laurie Chen of The Quietus called the album as "immensely evocative and conjures up entire scenes of the film when only a fragment is heard". James Southall of Movie Wave wrote "Britell tells the musical story well, but on album it doesn't offer nearly as compelling a musical narrative despite scaling some high peaks along the way."

== Accolades ==
Moonlight's score by Nicholas Britell received nominations under Best Original Score category in major award ceremonies—including Academy Awards, Golden Globe Awards and Critics' Choice Movie Awards. He lost all of them to Justin Hurwitz for his score in La La Land (2016). However, at the 2017 Black Reel Awards, Britell won the award for Outstanding Original Score, and also won the Hollywood Music in Media Award for Best Original Score in a Feature Film.

Award	Date of ceremony	Category	Recipient(s)	Result	Ref.
Academy Awards	February 26, 2017	Best Original Score	Nicholas Britell	Nominated	
Black Reel Awards	February 16, 2017	Outstanding Original Score	Nicholas Britell	Won	
Chicago Film Critics Association	December 15, 2016	Best Original Score	Nicholas Britell	Nominated	
Critics' Choice Movie Awards	December 11, 2016	Best Original Score	Nicholas Britell	Nominated	
Florida Film Critics Circle	December 23, 2016	Best Score	Moonlight – Nicholas Britell	Nominated	
Georgia Film Critics Association	January 13, 2017	Best Original Score	Nicholas Britell	Nominated	
Golden Globe Awards	January 8, 2017	Best Original Score	Nicholas Britell	Nominated	
Hollywood Music in Media Awards	November 17, 2016	Best Original Score – Feature Film	Nicholas Britell	Won	
Houston Film Critics Society	January 6, 2017	Best Original Score	Nicholas Britell	Nominated	
International Film Music Critics Association	February 23, 2017	Best Original Score for a Drama Film	Nicholas Britell	Nominated	
San Francisco Film Critics Circle	December 11, 2016	Best Original Score	Nicholas Britell	Nominated	
Seattle Film Critics Society	January 5, 2017	Best Original Score	Nicholas Britell	Nominated	
St. Louis Gateway Film Critics Association	December 18, 2016	Best Music/Score	Nicholas Britell	Nominated	
Washington D.C. Area Film Critics Association	December 5, 2016	Best Score	Nicholas Britell	Nominated	
