= Don't Look Down =

Don't Look Down may refer to:

== Films and TV ==
- Don't Look Down (1998 film), television movie produced by Wes Craven
- Don't Look Down (2008 film), Argentine film directed by Eliseo Subiela
- Don't Look Down (TV series), a TV series starring Kevin McCloud

== Music ==
- Much the Same, previously known as Don't Look Down, a punk rock band from Chicago

=== Albums ===
- Don't Look Down (Cerys Matthews album), 2009
- Don't Look Down (Ozark Mountain Daredevils album), 1977
- Don't Look Down (Skylar Grey album), 2013
- Don't Look Down (Mr. Lif album), 2016
- Don't Look Down (Kojey Radical album), 2025
- Don't Look Down (Rod Wave album), 2026
- An EP by Danny Sage, formerly of D Generation

=== Songs ===
- "Don't Look Down" (Go West song), 1985
- "Don't Look Down" (Lindsey Buckingham song), 1993
- "Don't Look Down" (Bring Me the Horizon song), 2014
- "Don't Look Down" (Martin Garrix song), 2015
- "Don't Look Down", a song by Iggy Pop from the album New Values
- "Don't Look Down", a song by Jennifer Hudson from the album I Remember Me
- "Don't Look Down", a song by Cryoshell from the album Next to Machines
- "Don't Look Down", a song by OneRepublic from the 2013 album Native

== Other ==
- Don't Look Down, a 2020 novel by Hilary Davidson

== See also ==
- "Don't Look Down on Me", debut single by Iron Butterfly
- Don't Look Up (disambiguation)
