= Don't Look Now (disambiguation) =

Don't Look Now is a 1973 film.

Don't Look Now may also refer to:

== Literature ==
- Don't Look Now (book), a book by Daphne du Maurier first published in 1971 as Not After Midnight, and "Don't Look Now", a story in the book

== Film and television ==
- Don't Look Now, a 1936 Merrie Melodies animated short directed by Tex Avery
- La Grande Vadrouille or Don't Look Now... We're Being Shot At!, a 1966 French comedy
- Don't Look Now, a 1950 British television series
- Don't Look Now, a 1983 PBS American children's TV show
- "Don't Look Now", an episode of SpongeBob SquarePants

== Music ==
- Don't Look Now, a 2004 album by Way Out West
- Don't Look Now...It's The Hallelujah Brothers, a 1989 album by Phil and John
- "Don't Look Now (It Ain't You or Me)", a 1969 song by Creedence Clearwater Revival from Willy and the Poor Boys
- "Don't Look Now", a 1984 song by Torch Song from Wish Thing
- "Don't Look Now", a 1993 song by Chapterhouse from Blood Music
- "Don't Look Now", a 2010 song by Far East Movement featuring Keri Hilson from Free Wired
- "Don't Look Now", a song by Rodney Carrington
- "Don't Look Now", a song by Sondre Lerche from the 2009 album Heartbeat Radio
