= Blanco White =

English musician (born 1991)

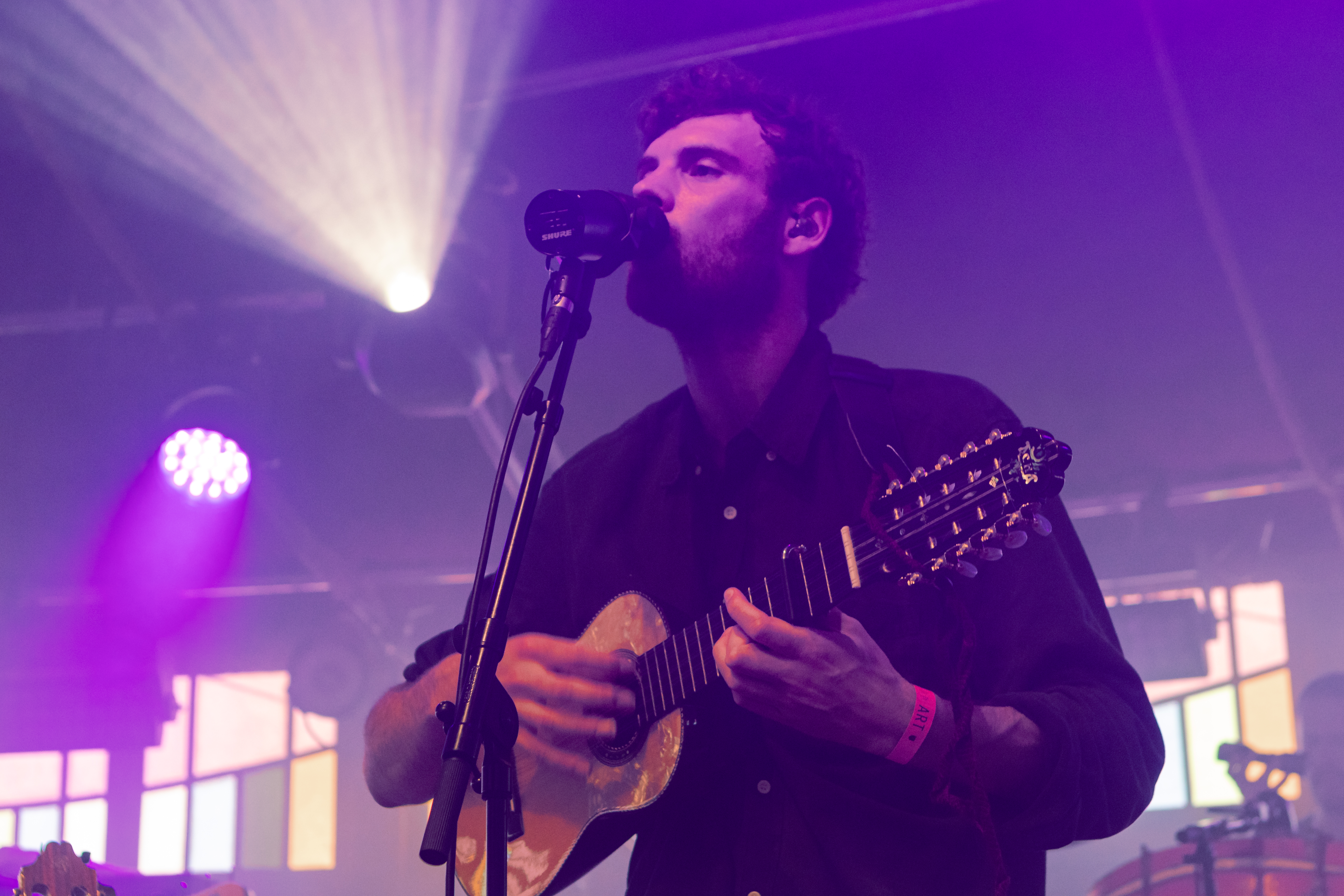
- Blanco White performing in 2019

Background information
- Born: Josh Edwards; 21 July 1991 (age 35)
- Origin: London, England
- Genres: Folk; neofolk; pop
- Occupation: Musician
- Instruments: Vocals; guitar; flamenco guitar; charango
- Years active: 2014–present
- Website: blancowhite.info

Josh Edwards (born 21 July 1991), known professionally as Blanco White, is an English singer-songwriter and guitarist from London. As of 2026, he has released three studio albums, four EPs, and a number of singles.

== Career ==
Originally from London, Edwards travelled to Cádiz, Spain, to study flamenco guitar, before going to Sucre, Bolivia, where he was introduced to traditional local folk music and learned to play the charango, an Andean instrument. In 2014, he brought together Andalusian and Latin American influences while keeping his English musical roots, which launched his solo project, named Blanco White, after the Spanish poet José María Blanco White.

His first show as Blanco White dates back to December 2015 at the London bar Proud Camden, where he was accompanied by the band Wovoka Gentle.

In 2016, Blanco White signed with the London-based Yucatán Records and released his first EP, titled The Wind Rose. He followed it with two more EPs: Colder Heavens in 2017 and The Nocturne in 2018.

Since 2016, he has toured Europe and the US, and he was nominated for an Anchor Award in 2018.

On 5 June 2020, he released his debut studio album, On the Other Side. He followed it on 29 September 2023 with his second album, Tarifa.

His third studio album, Green Island Days, was released on 20 November 2026.

== Discography ==
Studio albums

- On the Other Side (2020)
- Tarifa (2023)
- Green Island Days (2026)

EPs

- The Wind Rose EP (2016)
- Colder Heavens (2017)
- Nocturne EP (2018)
- Time Can Prove You Wrong (2023)

Singles

- "Colder Heavens (Acoustic Version)" (2017)
- "On the Other Side" (2019)
- "Papillon" (2019)
- "Desert Days" (2019)
- "Samara" (2020)
- "Mano a Mano" (2020)
- "Eyes Wide Open (from North Star)" (2021)
- "Time Can Prove You Wrong" (2022)
- "Treasure I Once Held" (2022)
- "Sail On By" (2023)
- "Tarifa" (2023)
- "Silver Beaches" (2023)
- "Una Noche Más" (2023)

== Awards and nominations ==
Year	Award	Result
2019	Anchor – Reeperbahn Festival International Music Award	Nominated
