= Don't Look Now (1950 TV series) =

1950 British BBC TV series

- Starring: Alfred Marks
- Country of origin: United Kingdom

Original release
- Release: 1950

Don't Look Now is a British television programme which aired in 1950 on the BBC. It starred Alfred Marks. All six episodes are missing, believed lost. They aired live, and while the ability to record live television was developed in late 1947, the BBC rarely used the technology until around 1953, as it was considered of unacceptable quality by the BBC prior to that.
