= Don't Look Away =

Don't Look Away may refer to:

- Don't Look Away (Kate Voegele album), 2007
- Don't Look Away (Alexander Tucker album), 2018
- "Don't Look Away" (The Who song)
- "Don't Look Away" (Hurricane No. 1 song)
- "Don't Look Away", a song by Hoobastank from their 2018 album Push Pull
