= Taura Stinson =

American songwriter, musician, author, producer

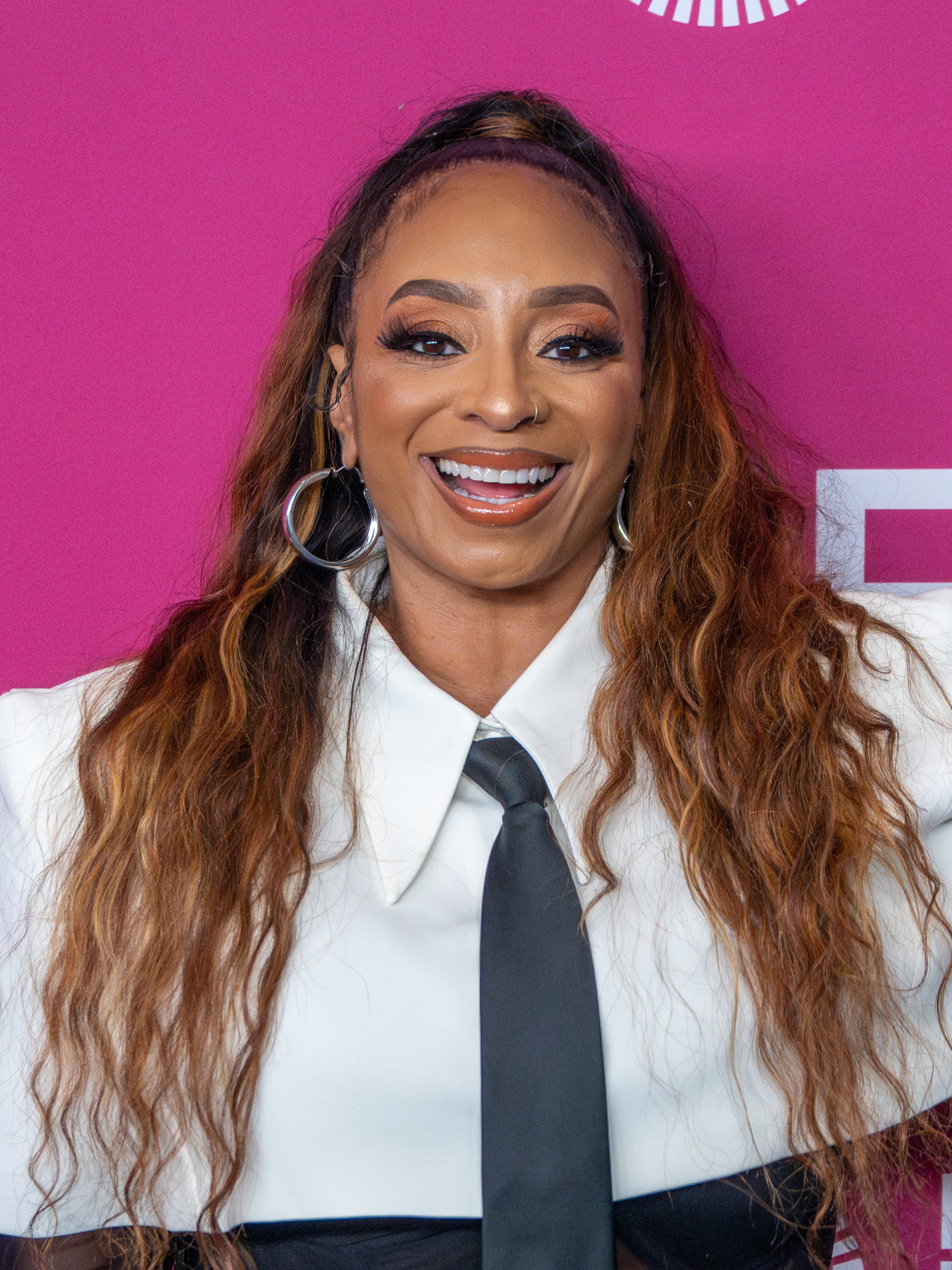
- Stinson in 2024
- Born: Birmingham, Alabama, US
- Occupation(s): Songwriter, musician, author, producer
- Website: www.taurastinson.com

Taura Stinson is an American songwriter, producer, musician, composer and author. Stinson has co-written songs for artists including Deborah Cox, Cynthia Erivo, Kelly Rowland, Destiny's Child, Kelis and Jennifer Hudson. She has also written songs for films such as Step, Mudbound and Black Nativity and for TV programs including Underground, Twin Peaks, Moon Girl and Devil Dinosaur, and Insecure.

Together with Laura Karpman and Raphael Saadiq she has won Critics' Choice Movie Awards and Hollywood Music in Media Awards.

Stinson has written and self-published two books, 100 Things Every Black Girl Should Know and 100 Ways to Love Yourself Inside and Out.

== Life and career ==
Taura Stinson was born in Birmingham, Alabama and raised in Oakland, California.

In the early 1990s, she co-founded an R&B trio called Emage with Kimbrely Evans and Mykah Montgomery. The trio signed a deal with One Love/Mercury Records and released one album, Soul Deep.

=== Discography ===
Stinson has written various songs with long time co-writer, Rapheal Saadiq, including the Grammy Award nominated songs "Good Man" (2012) by Saadiq, and "Show me the Way" (2005)) by Earth, Wind & Fire.

She has also written for artists including:

- Burns
- Cynthia Erivo ("Step")
- Deborah Cox
- Destiny's Child
- DRS ("Gangsta Lean")
- Jennifer Hudson
- Kelis
- Kelly Rowland
- Mary J. Blige ("Mighty River")
- Paloma Faith
- Usher

=== Filmography ===
Taura has written songs for various films including:

- Beyond the Lights ("Airplay")
- Black Nativity (soundtrack) together with Raphael Saddiq
- Epic ("Gonna Be Alright") together with Raphael Saddiq
- Men in Black: "Killing Time" (by Destiny's Child) with D'wayne Wiggins
- Mudbound ("Mighty River"), for which she received critical acclaim earning Academy Award, Golden Globe Award and Black Reel Award nominations for Best Original Song.
- Rio 2 ("Beautiful Creatures", "Don't Go Away", " O Vida") together with John Powell.
- The Sitter
- Step ("Jump"), which won the Critics Choice Award for best song in a documentary
- Don't Look Up ("Just Look Up")
- Cheaper by the Dozen ("Nothing Without You")

=== Television ===
Stinson has also written songs for television, such as

- Cloak & Dagger,"Come Sail Away"
- CSI: Miami
- Insecure
- 2016 Summer Olympics closing ceremony began with music from the Brazilian group Barbatuques, singing "Beautiful Creatures".
- Underground, various songs including “Gossypium Thorns”. Stinson was the voice of Rosalee
- You May Now Kill the Bride ("Carnivore")
- ToddWorld

=== Vocalist and arranger ===
Stinson has worked (recorded, arranged songs) for artists, including

- "Bang' Bang" by Jessie J feat Ariana Grande, and Nicki Minaj
- "Faith" by Stevie Wonder
- "Expensive" by Tori Kelly
- the album American Love Song by Ryan Bingham
- the album Electric Café by En Vogue
- "G" by Avenged Sevenfold

== Awards and nominations ==
Award	Category	Co-Recipients	Result	Ref
90th Academy Awards	Best Original Song	Mary J. Blige, Raphael Saadiq	Nominated	
18th Black Reel Awards	Best Original or Adapted Song	Mary J. Blige, Raphael Saadiq	Won	
75th Golden Globe Awards	Best Original Song	Mary J. Blige, Raphael Saadiq	Nominated	
2017 Georgia Film Critics Association Awards	Best Original Song	Mary J. Blige, Raphael Saadiq	Nominated	
Guild of Music Supervisors Awards	Best Song/Recording Created for a Film	Mary J. Blige, Raphael Saadiq	Nominated	
2017 Hollywood Music in Media Awards	Original Song — Documentary	Raphael Saadiq & Laura Karpman	Won	
Critics' Choice Movie Awards 2017	Best Song in a Documentary	Raphael Saadiq & Laura Karpman	Won	
Soul Train Music Award for The Ashford & Simpson Songwriter's Award	Record of the Year, 2011	Raphael Saadiq	Nominated	

== Publications ==
- 100 Things Every Black Girl Should Know (2016)
- 100 Ways to Love Yourself Inside and Out (2020)

== Other names ==
Stinson has worked under a variety of names, including Taura "Aura" Jackson, Stinson, Stinson-Jackson, T. Stinson, T. Stinson-Jackson, T. S. Jackson, Tara Stinson, Taura Latrice Stinson, Taura Stinson Jackson and Taura Stinson-Jackson.
