= Just Look Up =

Promotional single by Ariana Grande and Kid Cudi

from the album Don't Look Up (Soundtrack from the Netflix Film)
- Released: December 3, 2021
- Recorded: 2021
- Genre: Pop
- Length: 3:22
- Label: Republic
- Composers: Ariana Grande; Nicholas Britell
- Lyricists: Ariana Grande; Scott Mescudi; Taura Stinson
- Producer: Nicholas Britell

Ariana Grande promotional singles chronology
"Imagine" (2018)	"Just Look Up" (2021)	"I Don't Know Why (I Just Do)" (2025)

Music video
- Just Look Up on YouTube

"Just Look Up" is a song by American singer-songwriter Ariana Grande and American rapper Kid Cudi. The song was written by both artists alongside American film composer Nicholas Britell and American songwriter Taura Stinson, for the 2021 satirical science fiction film Don't Look Up, which both artists star in. The song was issued on December 3, 2021 for streaming and digital download prior to the soundtrack's release.

Ariana Grande and Kid Cudi star in the film as pop music power couple Riley Bina and DJ Chello, respectively. In satire fashion, news about their fluctuating relationship dominates the media, eclipsing news of the inevitable destruction of the Earth. "Just Look Up" starts off as a love song, then transforms into a rallying cry to listen to the scientists' message that humankind does not have much time left.

== Composition ==
Nicholas Britell read a draft of the script and had talked to the film's director Adam McKay for some time. He went to his piano and came up with a melody "for the chorus where I wanted it to feel like it was going upward". He played the song to Grande, who asked if she could "go into the booth and try some things out [...] And she basically laid down the entire vocal top line of the song with no lyrics, just improvising this whole thing." Britell said he then found it difficult to "write lyrics for a song that has to start as a love song and pivot to a song about blowing up" and make it "convincing", so asked Taura Stinson for help, who said she was "intimidated" at first but hearing Grande's melody helped her write. Kid Cudi insisted on writing his verse on his own.

Stinson said the song can be taken as being "about pollution or climate change or the vaccine. As I sat around the holidays with my family and a mask, it wasn't hard to fathom that." Britell was impressed upon receiving Stinson's lyrics, calling it "such a tricky thing to pull off. [... I]t's a sincere, real song that happens to express this absurd explanation of what is happening."

== Reception ==
McKay praised Grande's performance of the song. During a run-through of the duet with her co-star and Republic Records label-mate Kid Cudi, she began ad-libbing and improvising lyrics to which McKay referred to as "comedic gold". During the film scene where Grande's character performs the song, McKay went on to say that "Ariana sang it live. Every single take that we shot, she sang it live from beginning to end. It was an incredible thing."

Jazz Tangcay, an editor for Variety, praised the song on Twitter, calling it "a banger and a ballad." She added that the song is "crashing into the Original song #Oscars race." The song also received praise for its satirical and message and for Grande's vocals on the tune, with AwardsWatch founder Erik Anderson calling the song "fucking hilarious."

Nicholas Gaudet of MusicTalkers called the song “cheesy, and wonderfully so. It’s a power-ballad done anew, all the while being so familiar.” Mitchell Peters of Billboard, wrote the song “finds Grande steering some romantic balladry with a gorgeous tone and open heart, while Cudi takes a few seconds to fully deploy his croon but sounds comfortable when it arrives.“

== Live performances ==
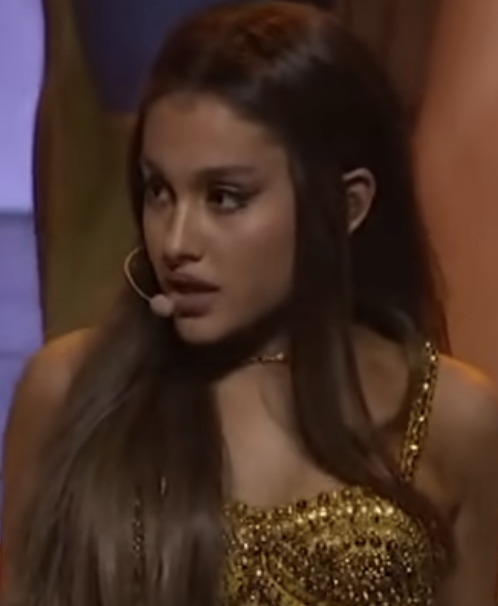
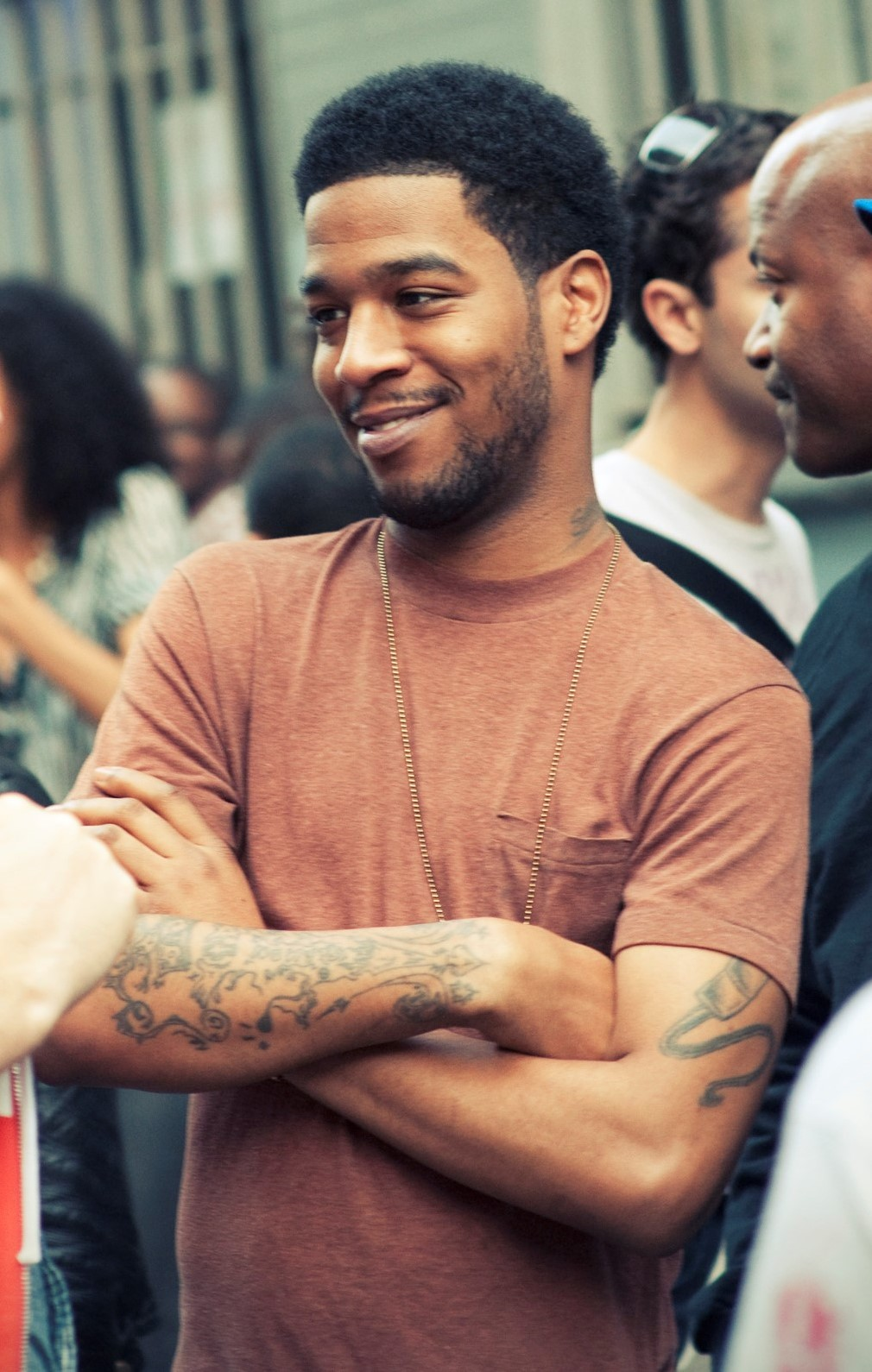
In "Don't Look Up", the song "Just Look Up" is performed by Ariana Grande and Kid Cudi.

On December 14, 2021, Cudi and Grande appeared on the season finale of American singing competition series The Voice, where they performed the song together live for the first time.

== Accolades ==
The song has been nominated for Best Original Song by Chicago Indie Critics, Hollywood Music in Media Awards, Critics' Choice Movie Awards, Denver Film Critics Society, DiscussingFilm Critics Awards, Georgia Film Critics Association, and Hawaii Film Critics Society, among others. It won the 2022 Society of Composers & Lyricists Award for Outstanding Original Song for a Comedy or Musical Visual Media Production.

== Commercial performance ==
"Just Look Up" peaked at number seven on the NZ Hot Singles chart and at 198 on the Billboard Global 200.

== Personnel ==
Credits for "Just Look Up" adapted from AllMusic.

- Nicholas Britell – composer, organ, piano, producer
- Ariana Grande – composer, primary artist
- Billy Hickey – engineer, mixing
- Kid Cudi – primary artist
- Randy Merrill – mastering engineer
- Scott Mescudi – composer
- Taura Stinson – composer
- Casey Stone – engineer
- William Sullivan – engineer

== Charts ==
Chart performance for "Just Look Up"
Chart (2021)	Peak position
Global 200 (Billboard)	198
New Zealand Hot Singles (RMNZ)	7

== Release history ==
List of release dates, showing region, release format, and label
Country	Date	Format	Label	Ref.
United States	December 3, 2021	Digital download; streaming	Republic	
