= Don't Look Up =

2021 American film by Adam McKay

- Release poster
- Directed by: Adam McKay
- Screenplay by: Adam McKay
- Story by: Adam McKay; David Sirota
- Produced by: Adam McKay; Kevin Messick
- Starring: Leonardo DiCaprio; Jennifer Lawrence; Meryl Streep; Cate Blanchett; Jonah Hill; Mark Rylance; Tyler Perry; Timothée Chalamet; Ariana Grande; Scott Mescudi; Rob Morgan; Ron Perlman
- Cinematography: Linus Sandgren
- Edited by: Hank Corwin
- Music by: Nicholas Britell
- Production companies: Hyperobject Industries; Bluegrass Films
- Distributed by: Netflix
- Release dates: December 5, 2021 (New York City); December 10, 2021 (United States); December 24, 2021 (Netflix)
- Running time: 138 minutes
- Country: United States
- Language: English
- Budget: $75 million
- Box office: $1.2 million

Don't Look Up is a 2021 American political satire black comedy film written, co-produced, and directed by Adam McKay from a story he co-wrote with David Sirota. It stars an ensemble cast featuring Leonardo DiCaprio, Jennifer Lawrence, Meryl Streep, Cate Blanchett, Rob Morgan, Jonah Hill, Mark Rylance, Tyler Perry, Timothée Chalamet, Ron Perlman, Ariana Grande, and Kid Cudi.The film tells the story of two astronomers attempting to warn humanity about an approaching comet that will destroy human civilization. The movie's central comet impact event was used by McKay as an allegory for threats arising from climate change. The film satirizes social, political, corporate, celebrity, and media indifference, in particular to the climate crisis, and parallels societal responses to science during the COVID-19 pandemic.

Produced by McKay's Hyperobject Industries and Bluegrass Films, the film was announced in November 2019. Originally set for a theatrical release by Paramount Pictures, the distribution rights were acquired by Netflix several months later. Lawrence became the first member of the cast to join, with DiCaprio signing on after his discussions with McKay on adjustments to the script; the rest of the cast was added through 2020. Filming was initially set to begin in April 2020 in Massachusetts, but it was delayed due to the COVID-19 pandemic; it eventually began in November 2020 and wrapped in February 2021.

Don't Look Up began a limited theatrical release on December 10, 2021, before streaming on Netflix on December 24. It was praised for the cast's performances and the musical score, but critics were divided on the merits of McKay's satire: some found it deft, while others criticized it as smug and heavy-handed. Donna Lu of The Guardian notes that the movie "received a frosty reception from many film critics", while being thoroughly lauded by climate activists. Don't Look Up was named one of the top ten films of 2021 by the National Board of Review and American Film Institute. It received four Academy Award nominations (including Best Picture), four Golden Globe Award nominations (including Best Picture – Musical or Comedy), six Critics' Choice Award nominations, (including Best Picture), and also won Best Original Screenplay at the 74th Writers Guild of America Awards. The film set a new record for the most viewing hours in a single week on Netflix, and went on to become the second-most-watched movie on Netflix within 28 days of release.

== Plot ==
Kate Dibiasky, a doctoral candidate in astronomy at Michigan State University, discovers a previously unknown comet. Her adviser, Dr. Randall Mindy, calculates that it will collide with Earth in approximately six months and is large enough to cause a global extinction event. Dr. Teddy Oglethorpe, head of their Planetary Defense Coordination Office, verifies their findings and accompanies them to present their findings to the White House. However, they are met with apathy from President Janie Orlean and her son Jason, who is also her Chief of Staff.

At Oglethorpe's encouragement, Dibiasky and Mindy leak the news on a popular morning show. When hosts Jack Bremmer and Brie Evantee treat the topic flippantly, Dibiasky loses her temper and rants about the threat before leaving. Public reaction is muted, and the announcement is downplayed by the NASA Director, a top donor to Orlean with no background in astronomy. When Orlean's sexual relations with her Supreme Court nominee make headlines, she tries to divert public attention to the threat of the comet, announcing a project to strike and divert the comet using nuclear weapons.

The mission successfully launches, but Orlean abruptly aborts it when Peter Isherwell, the billionaire CEO of BASH Cellular and another top donor, discovers that the comet contains trillions of dollars' worth of rare-earth elements. The White House agrees to commercially exploit the comet by fragmenting and recovering it from the ocean, using technology proposed by BASH in a scheme that has not undergone peer review. Orlean sidelines Dibiasky and Oglethorpe while hiring Mindy as National Science Advisor. Dibiasky attempts to mobilize public opposition to the scheme but gives up under threat from the administration. Mindy becomes a prominent voice advocating for the comet's commercial opportunities and begins an affair with Evantee.

Public opinion is divided among people who believe the comet is a severe threat, those who believe that mining a destroyed comet will create jobs, and those who deny that the comet even exists. When Dibiasky returns home to Illinois, she begins a relationship with a young man named Yule who she meets at her retail job. Mindy's wife comes to Washington to confront him about his infidelity, and returns to Michigan without him. Mindy questions Isherwell about the reliability of his technology, angering the billionaire.

Cut off from the administration, Mindy reconciles with Dibiasky as the comet becomes visible from Earth. Mindy, Dibiasky, and Oglethorpe organize a protest campaign on social media, telling people to "Just Look Up" and call on other countries to conduct comet interception operations. Simultaneously, Orlean starts an anti-campaign telling people "Don't Look Up". Russia, India, and China prepare their own joint deflection mission—only for their spacecraft to explode on takeoff, ending the possibility of a successful deflection. As the comet becomes larger in the sky, Orlean's supporters turn on her administration.

BASH's launches aimed at breaking the comet apart go awry, and everyone soon realizes that humanity is doomed. Isherwell, Orlean, and other elites board a sleeper spaceship designed to find an Earth analog. Orlean forgetfully leaves Jason behind, but offers Mindy two places on the ship. He declines, choosing to spend a final evening with his wife and children, Oglethorpe, Dibiasky, and Yule. As expected, the comet strikes off the coast of Chile, triggering an explosive extinction event.

In a mid-credits scene, the sleeper spaceship lands on a lush alien planet 22,740 years later with a serious percentage of deaths before/during planetfall. Admiring the habitable world, Orlean is suddenly killed by a large, avian creature—a death predicted earlier by BASH's algorithms; other survivors soon find themselves surrounded by other avian creatures with no way to defend themselves. In a post-credits scene on Earth, Jason emerges from the rubble, having survived the impact and recording a social-media message ("#LastManOnEarth").

== Cast ==
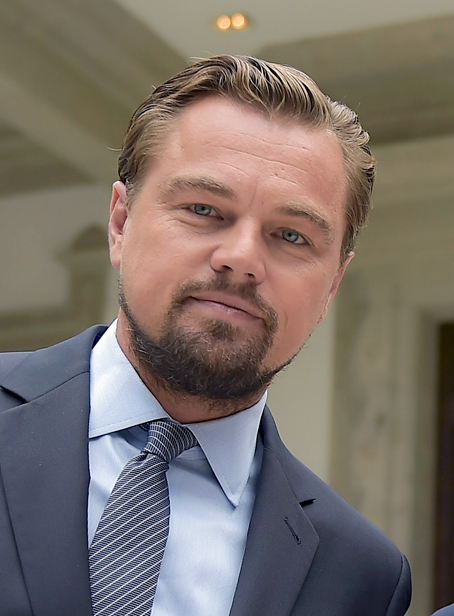
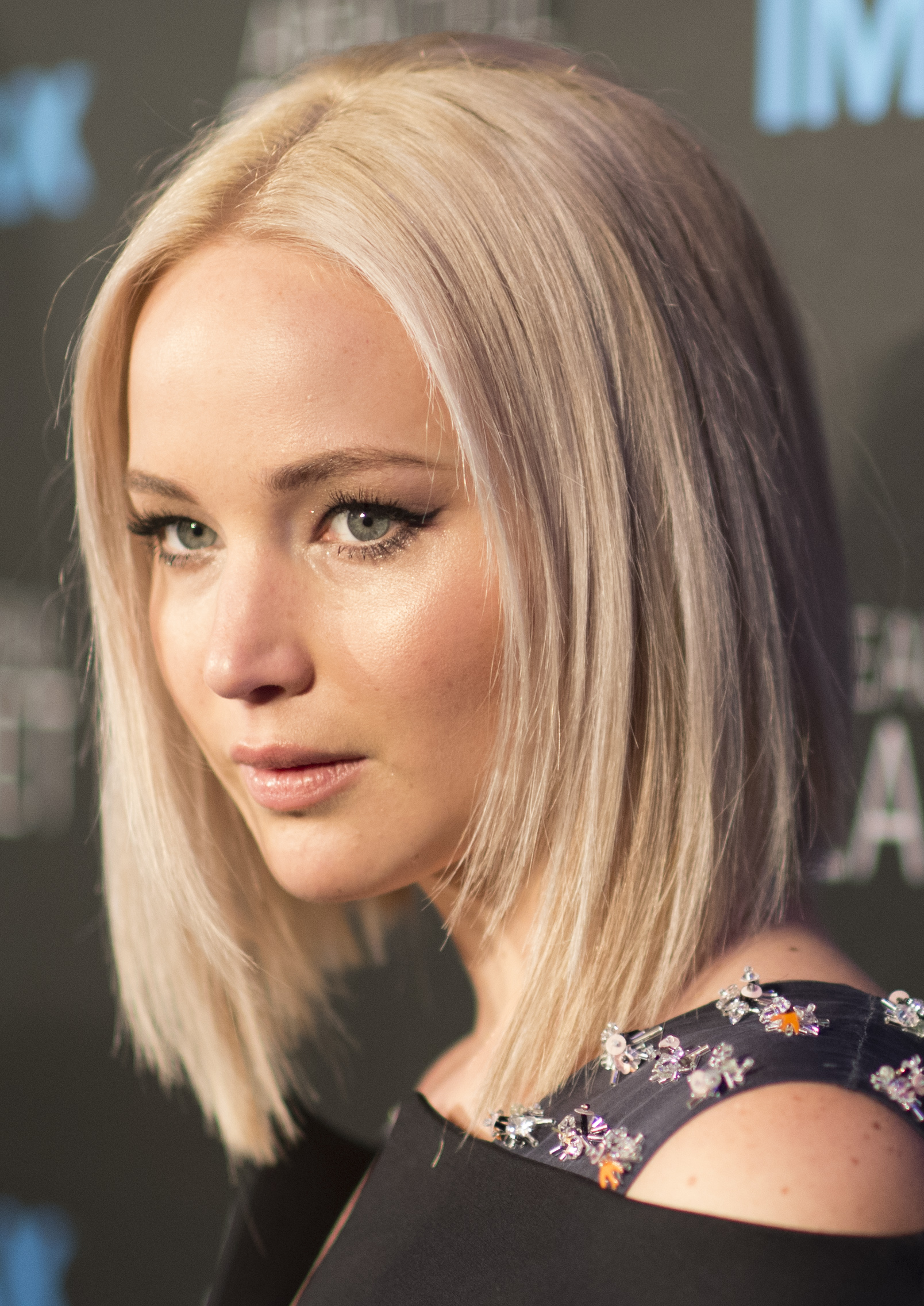
The film stars Leonardo DiCaprio and Jennifer Lawrence as astronomers who discover the planet-killing comet.
- Leonardo DiCaprio as Dr. Randall Mindy, an astronomy professor at Michigan State University (MSU) and Kate's teacher
- Jennifer Lawrence as Kate Dibiasky, an MSU doctoral candidate in astronomy
- Meryl Streep as Janie Orlean, the President of the United States.
- Cate Blanchett as Brie Evantee, co-host of The Daily Rip
- Rob Morgan as Dr. Teddy Oglethorpe, head of the Planetary Defense Coordination Office
- Jonah Hill as Jason Orlean, the White House Chief of Staff and President Orlean's son.
- Mark Rylance as Peter Isherwell, the billionaire CEO of the fictitious tech company BASH and one of Orlean's top donors.
- Tyler Perry as Jack Bremmer, the co-host of The Daily Rip
- Timothée Chalamet as Yule, a young shoplifter whom Kate befriends
- Ron Perlman as Colonel Benedict Drask, war veteran and Presidential Medal of Freedom recipient who is sent up with the initial launch to divert the comet
- Ariana Grande as Riley Bina, an international pop music star
- Scott Mescudi as DJ Chello, an international rapper who becomes Riley's fiancé on The Daily Rip
- Himesh Patel as Phillip Kaj, a journalist at Autopsy and Kate's boyfriend
- Melanie Lynskey as June Mindy, Dr. Randall Mindy's wife
- Michael Chiklis as Dan Pawketty, the host of the conservative Patriot News Network
- Tomer Sisley as Adul Grelio, the senior editor at the New York Herald
- Paul Guilfoyle as US Air Force Lieutenant General Stuart Themes, the Pentagon liaison to the White House
- Robert Joy as Congressman Tenant, a congressman and follower of Janie

Other cast members include Kevin Craig West as the Secretary of State; Erik Parillo as Sheriff Conlon, Orlean's choice for Supreme Court Justice who ends up in a sex scandal with Orlean; Jon Glaser as Meow Man; Sarah Nolen as the puppeteer of Sammy; Allyn Burrows as Mr. Dibiasky, the father of Kate; and Tori Davis Lawlor as Mrs. Dibiasky, the mother of Kate.

Additionally, Robert Hurst Radochia and Conor Sweeney appear as Randall and June's sons, Evan and Marshall Mindy. Hettienne Park appears as Dr. Jocelyn Calder, the Administrator of NASA. Chris Everett appears as Paula Woods, chief editor at the New York Herald.

There are cameo appearances by Liev Schreiber as the BASH narrator, journalist Ashleigh Banfield as Dalia Hensfield, Sarah Silverman as comedian Sarah Benterman, Indian actor Ishaan Khatter as Raghav Manavalan, and Chris Evans in an uncredited role as film actor Devin Peters, who stars in the film Total Devastation.

Matthew Perry and Gina Gershon were cast for undisclosed roles in the film, but their scenes were cut.

== Production ==
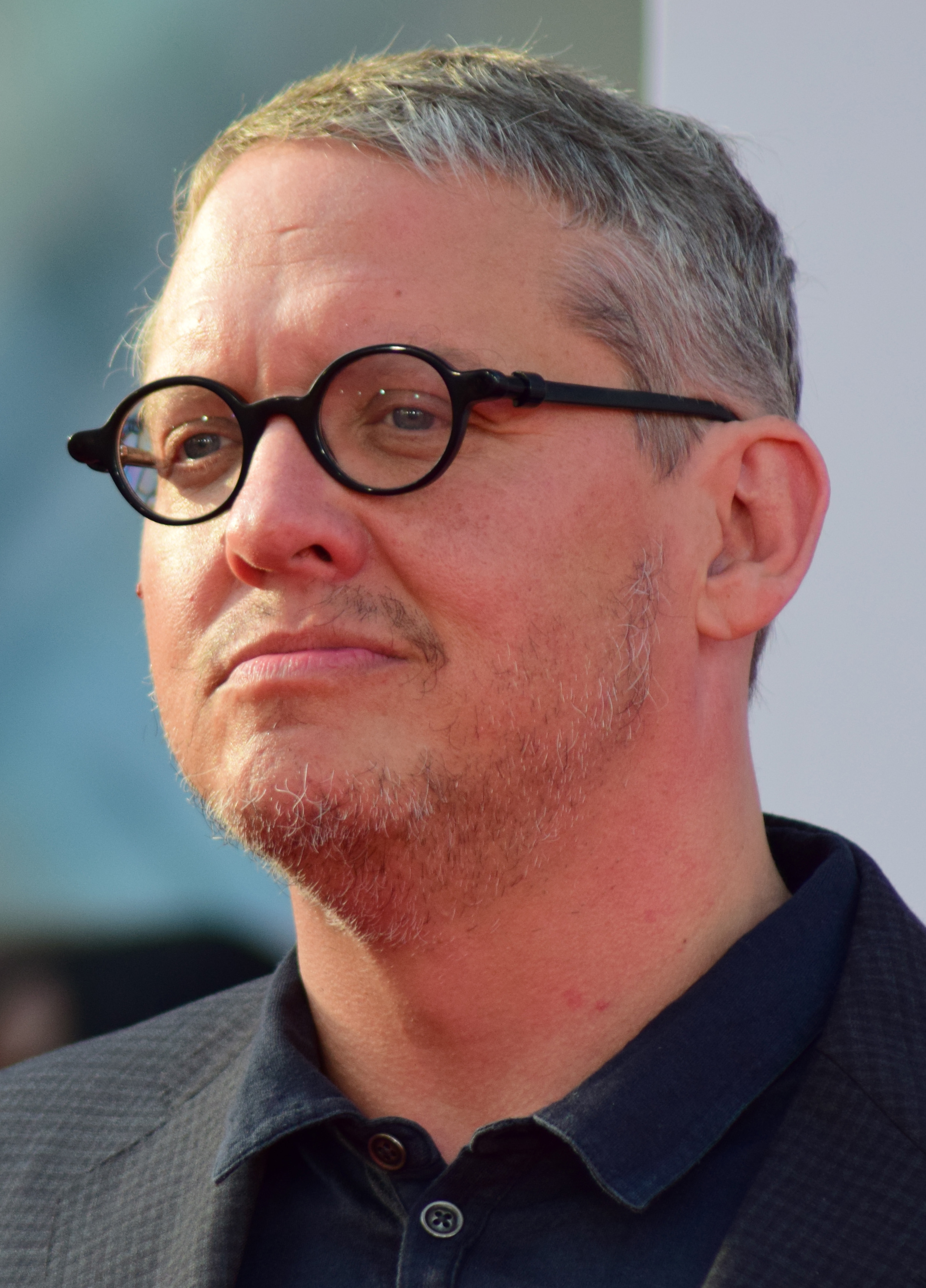
Writer, director, and producer Adam McKay

Produced by Hyperobject Industries and Bluegrass Films, the film was announced in November 2019 and sold by Paramount Pictures to Netflix several months later. Jennifer Lawrence became the first member of the cast to join, with Leonardo DiCaprio signing on after his discussions with McKay on adjustments to the script; the rest of the cast was added through 2020.

This movie came from my burgeoning terror about the climate crisis and the fact that we live in a society that tends to place it as the fourth or fifth news story, or in some cases even deny that it's happening, and how horrifying that is, but at the same time preposterously funny.

— Adam McKay, the film's writer-director-producer (2021)

After Vice was released, David Sirota asked Adam McKay to use his "superpowers of humor and writing" to create a climate change movie that would be different from the Mad Max-type post-apocalyptic films that had previously been released. In an interview with Entertainment Weekly, McKay described how he and Sirota came up with the premise of Don't Look Up while discussing the existential threat of climate change and their frustration over the lack of media coverage it was receiving:

I started talking to a lot of [climate] scientists. I kept looking for good news, and I never got it. Everything I was hearing was worse than what I was hearing on the mainstream media. So I was talking to [David Sirota], and we were both just like, "can you believe that this isn't being covered in the media? That it's being pushed to the end of the story? That there's no headlines?" And Sirota just offhandedly said, "it's like a comet is heading to Earth and it's going to destroy us all and no one cares." And I was like, "that's the idea!"

McKay has described the film as a "blend of broad comedy" with elements of disaster films and horror films.

Astronomer Amy Mainzer, principal investigator of NASA's NEOWISE mission that tracks near-Earth objects, served as an "astrotech adviser" for the film. She provided scientific advice and supported with writing scenes from an early stage of production.

On November 8, 2019, it was announced that Paramount Pictures would distribute the film, with Adam McKay writing, directing and producing under his Hyperobject Industries banner. On February 19, 2020, Netflix acquired the film from Paramount and Jennifer Lawrence was cast in the film. On May 12, 2020, it was announced that Cate Blanchett had joined the film. In September 2020, Rob Morgan joined the cast. In October 2020, DiCaprio, Meryl Streep, Jonah Hill, Himesh Patel, Timothée Chalamet, Ariana Grande, Kid Cudi (Scott Mescudi) and Tomer Sisley were added. McKay wrote the part of Dibiasky specifically for Lawrence, and spent four to five months going over ideas with DiCaprio, tweaking the script before the actor ultimately signed on. In November 2020, Tyler Perry, Melanie Lynskey and Ron Perlman joined the cast. Mark Rylance and Michael Chiklis were revealed as part of the cast in February 2021. Paul Guilfoyle was announced in May. Matthew Perry was also cast and had scenes filmed with Hill that were ultimately cut from the final film due to health issues. Gina Gershon also filmed a scene with DiCaprio and Blanchett that was cut from the film. Leonardo DiCaprio received top billing on the film's posters and the trailers while Jennifer Lawrence was accorded top billing at the beginning of the film itself. This was also the case with earlier productions The Man Who Shot Liberty Valance (1962) with James Stewart and John Wayne and All the President's Men (1976) with Robert Redford and Dustin Hoffman.

Principal photography was delayed due to the COVID-19 pandemic. Filming commenced on November 18, 2020, at various locations in Boston, Massachusetts. Part of the film takes place in New York City with Boston standing in as New York. Filming also took place in other Massachusetts cities including Brockton, Framingham, and Westborough. (Note: Additional filming locations include Canton, Chicopee, Fall River, Norton, Salisbury, Weymouth, and Worcester.) On February 5, 2021, Jennifer Lawrence was mildly injured during filming when a controlled glass explosion went awry. Filming wrapped on February 18, 2021.

=== Lawsuits ===
On December 6, 2023, Adam McKay, along with Netflix, was sued for copyright infringement over Don't Look Up by William Collier, an author from Baton Rouge, Louisiana, who stated that he is the original writer of the story, which was set in Baton Rouge, called Stanley's Comet, and self-published by Collier in 2012. Collier's daughter worked for Jimmer Miller Entertainment, part of McKay's management team until 2015. Collier stated that his daughter submitted the text to Mosaic Media Group and it was then received by McKay's manager. Steven Lowe, a lawyer for Collier, wrote in the suit: "Since Stanley’s Comet was received by McKay’s manager, custom and practice in the entertainment industry dictates that this constitutes receipt by McKay. Furthermore, upon information and belief, the Novel was transmitted via courier, email or hand-delivery (or via other means) to McKay himself".

"The movie, like the novel, makes a strong political critique of the media, the government, and the cultural elite by showcasing their shallowness and reliance on popular opinion polls and social media algorithms", wrote USC professor of comparative literature David Roman. "McKay’s film is also full of satire and humor and — like Stanley’s Comet — moves toward the absurd. In each case, the irony drives the humor and the social critique and does so in the same style and method".

Collier's lawsuit was dismissed in 2024 on the grounds that the similarities between the works were too generic to be copyrightable, and he later dropped an attempt to appeal the decision. A second lawsuit, from author Darren Hunter, was dismissed in 2025 on similar grounds.

=== Music ===
To promote the film, on December 3, 2021, Ariana Grande and Kid Cudi released the single "Just Look Up", which is also performed in the film. The original score for the film is composed by Nicholas Britell, who previously scored McKay's The Big Short (2015), Vice (2018) and the HBO television series Succession (2019–2022); McKay served as an executive producer of the latter. He used a wide range of instrumentation that reflect varied music styles and genres. He did this so as to give a remainder on the existential crisis on the planet following a catastrophic event as well as the absurdity of how people react to it. Two of the film's most climactic pieces, titled The Launch and The End?, utilize borrowed chords (exemplified in the oscillation from D-flat major to A-flat minor) to reflect humanity's regretful handling of their looming and somewhat enchanting demise.

Apart from "Just Look Up", the film also featured "Second Nature" by Bon Iver, which was released along with Britell's score album on December 10, by Republic Records, and "Doorman" by Slowthai.

== Reception ==
=== Box office and VoD ===
On February 19, 2020, it was announced that Netflix planned to release the film in 2020. Due to the COVID-19 pandemic, filming and release of the film were delayed. The film premiered in New York City on December 5, 2021. It received a limited theatrical release on December 10, and began streaming on Netflix on December 24. The film made an estimated $260,000 from 500 theaters on its first day, and a total of $700,000 in its opening weekend.

Don't Look Up was the most-streamed English-language film on Netflix during its first week of release with a viewership of 111.03 million hours, the second highest viewership for a movie during its debut weekend on Netflix. It was the second most-streamed-film of the week in the United States according to TV Time. Per Nielsen, the film had a viewership of 1.6 billion minutes in the United States. In the second week, it retained its first position with a viewership of 152.29 million hours, which also set the record for highest weekly viewership for any film ever on Netflix.

For its first 28 days, the film culminated a viewership of 359.8 million hours, making it the second most-watched film within 28 days of release on Netflix during this period of time. By March 20, the film had been streamed in 10.3 million households in the United States according to Samba TV, including 641,000 since the Oscar nomination announcements on February 8.

=== Critical response ===
On the review aggregator website Rotten Tomatoes, 56% of 305 critics' reviews are positive, with an average rating of 6.3/10. The website's consensus reads: "Don't Look Up aims too high for its scattershot barbs to consistently land, but Adam McKay's star-studded satire hits its target of collective denial square on." Metacritic, which uses a weighted average, assigned the film a score of 49 out of 100, based on 52 critics, indicating "mixed or average" reviews. The critical response to Don't Look Up made it one of the worst-reviewed films to be ever nominated for Best Picture at the Academy Awards.

The San Francisco Chronicle's Mick LaSalle praised the film: "Don't Look Up might be the funniest movie of 2021. It's the most depressing too, and that odd combination makes for a one-of-a-kind experience. ... McKay gives you over two hours of laughs while convincing you that the world is coming to an end". Richard Roeper of the Chicago Sun-Times gave the film 2.5 out of 4 stars and said: "From Streep and DiCaprio and Lawrence through the supporting players, Don't Look Up is filled with greatly talented actors really and truly selling this material—but the volume remains at 11 throughout the story when some changes in tone here and there might have more effectively carried the day". In the Los Angeles Times, Justin Chang wrote: "Nothing about the foolishness and outrageousness of what the movie shows us—no matter how virtuosically sliced and diced by McKay's characteristically jittery editor, Hank Corwin—can really compete with the horrors of our real-world American idiocracy". Amit Katwala of Wired concluded that "Don't Look Up nails the frustration of being a scientist". Linda Marric of The Jewish Chronicle gave the film 4/5 stars, writing: "There is something genuinely endearing about a film that doesn't seem to care one bit about coming across as silly as long as its message is heard".

In a negative review, David Rooney of The Hollywood Reporter called it "A cynical, insufferably smug satire stuffed to the gills with stars that purports to comment on political and media inattention to the climate crisis but really just trivializes it. Dr. Strangelove it ain't". Peter Debruge of Variety called it a "smug, easy-target political satire" and wrote: "Don't Look Up plays like the leftie answer to Armageddon—which is to say, it ditches the Bruckheimer approach of assembling a bunch of blue-collar heroes to rocket out to space and nuke the approaching comet, opting instead to spotlight the apathy, incompetence and financial self-interest of all involved". In The Guardian, Charles Bramesco wrote that the "script states the obvious as if everyone else is too stupid to realize it and does so from a position of lofty superiority that would drive away any partisans who still need to be won over". In The Sociological Review, Katherine Cross accused the film of "smug condescension" and wrote that it "is designed to flatter a certain type of liberal viewer into feeling like they're the last sane person in the world, surrounded by morons".

Reviews from right-wing publications were nearly unanimously negative. Madeline Fry Schultz of the American conservative publication Washington Examiner wrote: "McKay manages to deliver nothing more than a derivative and meandering 'satire' of capitalism, Donald Trump, and climate deniers that will be forgotten in less than six months". Kyle Smith of the National Review wrote that it "expends 140 brain-injuriously unfunny minutes... propelling low-velocity spitballs at social media, Washington, tech moguls, Trumpism, and (this detail feels thrown in last minute) anti-vaxxers".

Nathan J. Robinson, editor of American progressive publication Current Affairs, believed that "critics were not only missing the point of the film in important ways, but that the very way they discussed the film exemplified the problem that the film was trying to draw attention to. Some of the responses to the movie could have appeared in the movie itself". Slavoj Žižek, writing in Compact, said that "critics were displeased by the light tone of Don't Look Up!, claiming it trivializes the ultimate apocalypse. What really bothered these critics is the exact opposite: The film highlights trivialization that permeates not only the establishment, but even the protesters". In The Guardian, Catherine Bennett viewed the film as astute and was caustic about the critical reviews. Writing for the American socialist publication Jacobin, Branko Marcetic said that the plot of the film, while absurd, does not exaggerate, noting the parallels between the film and our world, including oligarch-corrupted democracy, foolish and greedy politicians and a vapid media. Nevertheless, he pointed out that, while it is too late for the characters of the film to find the way out of their impending crisis, it is not too late for us. Journalist and environmental activist George Monbiot wrote that "no wonder journalists have slated it ... it's about them" and added that for environmental activists like himself, the film, while fast‑paced and humorous, "seemed all too real". Author and activist Naomi Klein mentioned it in her 2023 book Doppelganger: A Trip Into the Mirror World by saying that "Kate's plight perfectly mirrors the bizarre contradictions of our high-stakes moment in planetary history: we are all trapped inside economic and social structures that encourage us to obsessively perfect our minuscule selves even as we know, if only on a subconscious level, that we are in the very last years when it might still be possible to avert an existential planetary crisis".

Bong Joon-ho, director of Parasite, included Don't Look Up as one of his favorites of 2021.

=== Reception amongst scientists ===
After the film's release, numerous climate scientists and climate communicators offered positive opinions on the film.

In an opinion piece published in The Guardian, climate scientist Peter Kalmus remarked: "Don't Look Up is satire. But speaking as a climate scientist doing everything I can to wake people up and avoid planetary destruction, it's also the most accurate film about society's terrifying non-response to climate breakdown I've seen". Climate scientist Michael E. Mann also expressed support for the film, calling it "serious sociopolitical commentary posing as comedy". In an article for Scientific American, Rebecca Oppenheimer questioned the film's use of a comet impact as an effective metaphor for climate change, given the large differences in timescale of these differing potential extinction crisis events and the nature of their impacts, but praised its depiction of science denialism and depiction of a botched attempt to address a "planet-killer" comet. Climate policy expert Ayana Elizabeth Johnson and McKay wrote a joint op-ed in The Guardian advocating for the value of humour in promoting action on climate change, in contrast with other media coverage.

Writing in Physics World, Laura Hiscott said that this "genuinely funny and entertaining film" would appeal to scientists, who would appreciate the "nods to academia such as the importance of peer review, the 'publish or perish' problem and the issue of senior academics getting the credit for their PhD students' discoveries".

One of the scenes in the film was compared on social media to a situation in Brazil. In that situation, microbiologist and science communicator Natália Pasternak Taschner criticized a news report made by TV Cultura on a live broadcast in December 2020. They told the Brazilian population to face the COVID-19 pandemic with "lightness", minimizing the risks. They also put pressure on the public to be content and uncritical of the Jair Bolsonaro administration's lack of effective response to the pandemic. Hearing about the comparisons, Pasternak thanked McKay, DiCaprio and Lawrence on Twitter, with the video subtitled in English, for the "incredible" film.

=== Accolades ===
Accolades received by Don't Look Up
Award	Date of ceremony	Category	Recipient(s)	Result	Ref.
AACTA International Awards	January 26, 2022	Best Supporting Actress	Cate Blanchett	Nominated	
AARP Movies for Grownups Awards	March 18, 2022	Best Ensemble	Don't Look Up	Nominated	
Academy Awards	March 27, 2022	Best Picture	Adam McKay and Kevin Messick	Nominated	
Academy Awards	March 27, 2022	Best Original Screenplay	Adam McKay and David Sirota	Nominated	
Academy Awards	March 27, 2022	Best Original Score	Nicholas Britell	Nominated	
Academy Awards	March 27, 2022	Best Film Editing	Hank Corwin	Nominated	
African-American Film Critics Association Awards	January 17, 2022	Best Screenplay	Adam McKay	Won	
Alliance of Women Film Journalists Awards	January 25, 2022	Best Original Screenplay	Adam McKay	Nominated	
Alliance of Women Film Journalists Awards	January 25, 2022	Best Editing	Hank Corwin	Nominated	
American Cinema Editors Awards	March 5, 2022	Best Edited Feature Film – Comedy or Musical	Hank Corwin	Nominated	
American Film Institute Awards	March 11, 2022	Top 10 Films	Don't Look Up	Won	
Art Directors Guild Awards	March 5, 2022	Excellence in Production Design for a Contemporary Film	Clayton Hartley	Nominated	
Artios Awards	March 23, 2022	Outstanding Achievement in Casting – Big Budget – Comedy	Francine Maisler, Kathy Driscoll-Mohler, Carolyn Pickman, Matt Bouldry, Kyle Crand, and Molly Rose	Won	
British Academy Film Awards	March 13, 2022	Best Film	Adam McKay and Kevin Messick	Nominated	
British Academy Film Awards	March 13, 2022	Best Actor in a Leading Role	Leonardo DiCaprio	Nominated	
British Academy Film Awards	March 13, 2022	Best Original Screenplay	Adam McKay	Nominated	
British Academy Film Awards	March 13, 2022	Best Original Music	Nicholas Britell	Nominated	
Costume Designers Guild Awards	March 9, 2022	Excellence in Contemporary Film	Susan Matheson	Nominated	
Critics' Choice Movie Awards	March 13, 2022	Best Picture	Don't Look Up	Nominated	
Critics' Choice Movie Awards	March 13, 2022	Best Acting Ensemble	Don't Look Up	Nominated	
Critics' Choice Movie Awards	March 13, 2022	Best Original Screenplay	Adam McKay and David Sirota	Nominated	
Critics' Choice Movie Awards	March 13, 2022	Best Comedy	Don't Look Up	Nominated	
Critics' Choice Movie Awards	March 13, 2022	Best Song	"Just Look Up" (Note: Nominees: Ariana Grande, Kid Cudi, Nicholas Britell, and Taura Stinson)	Nominated	
Critics' Choice Movie Awards	March 13, 2022	Best Score	Nicholas Britell	Nominated	
Critics' Choice Super Awards	March 17, 2022	Best Science Fiction/Fantasy Movie	Don't Look Up	Nominated	
Critics' Choice Super Awards	March 17, 2022	Best Actor in a Science Fiction/Fantasy Movie	Leonardo DiCaprio	Nominated	
Critics' Choice Super Awards	March 17, 2022	Best Actress in a Science Fiction/Fantasy Movie	Cate Blanchett	Nominated	
Critics' Choice Super Awards	March 17, 2022	Best Actress in a Science Fiction/Fantasy Movie	Jennifer Lawrence	Nominated	
Detroit Film Critics Society Awards	December 6, 2021	Best Film	Don't Look Up	Nominated	
Detroit Film Critics Society Awards	December 6, 2021	Best Director	Adam McKay	Nominated	
Detroit Film Critics Society Awards	December 6, 2021	Best Screenplay	Adam McKay	Won	
Detroit Film Critics Society Awards	December 6, 2021	Best Ensemble	Don't Look Up	Nominated	
Georgia Film Critics Association Awards	January 14, 2022	Best Original Song	"Just Look Up"	Nominated	
Golden Globe Awards	January 9, 2022	Best Motion Picture – Musical or Comedy	Don't Look Up	Nominated	
Golden Globe Awards	January 9, 2022	Best Actor – Motion Picture Musical or Comedy	Leonardo DiCaprio	Nominated	
Golden Globe Awards	January 9, 2022	Best Actress – Motion Picture Comedy or Musical	Jennifer Lawrence	Nominated	
Golden Globe Awards	January 9, 2022	Best Screenplay	Adam McKay	Nominated	
Hollywood Critics Association Awards	February 28, 2022	Best Cast Ensemble	Don't Look Up	Nominated	
Hollywood Music in Media Awards	November 17, 2021	Best Original Score in a Feature Film	Nicholas Britell	Won	
Hollywood Music in Media Awards	November 17, 2021	Best Original Song in a Feature Film	"Just Look Up"	Nominated	
Hollywood Music in Media Awards	November 17, 2021	Song – Onscreen Performance	Ariana Grande and Kid Cudi (for "Just Look Up")	Nominated	
Houston Film Critics Society Awards	January 19, 2022	Best Picture	Don't Look Up	Nominated	
Houston Film Critics Society Awards	January 19, 2022	Best Screenplay	Adam McKay	Nominated	
Houston Film Critics Society Awards	January 19, 2022	Best Original Song	"Just Look Up"	Nominated	
International Film Music Critics Association Awards	February 17, 2022	Best Original Score for a Comedy Film	Nicholas Britell	Nominated	
Lumiere Awards	March 4, 2022	Voices For The Earth Award	Adam McKay	Won	
Make-Up Artists and Hair Stylists Guild Awards	February 19, 2022	Best Contemporary Make-Up in a Feature-Length Motion Picture	Liz Bernstrom, Julie LeShane, Claudia Moriel, and Joe Dulude II	Nominated	
National Board of Review	December 2, 2021	Top Ten Films	Don't Look Up	Won	
New York Film Critics Online	December 12, 2021	Top Ten Films	Don't Look Up	Won	
Producers Guild of America Award	March 19, 2022	Outstanding Producer of Theatrical Motion Pictures	Adam McKay and Kevin Messick	Nominated	
San Diego Film Critics Society Awards	January 10, 2022	Best Original Screenplay	Adam McKay	Nominated	
San Diego Film Critics Society Awards	January 10, 2022	Best Comedic Performance	Leonardo DiCaprio	Nominated	
San Diego Film Critics Society Awards	January 10, 2022	Best Performance by an Ensemble	Don't Look Up	Won	
San Francisco Bay Area Film Critics Circle Awards	January 10, 2022	Best Original Screenplay	Adam McKay and David Sirota	Nominated	
Screen Actors Guild Awards	February 27, 2022	Outstanding Performance by a Cast in a Motion Picture	Don't Look Up (Note: Nominees: Cate Blanchett, Timothée Chalamet, Leonardo DiCaprio, Ariana Grande, Jonah Hill, Jennifer Lawrence, Melanie Lynskey, Kid Cudi, Rob Morgan, Himesh Patel, Ron Perlman, Tyler Perry, Mark Rylance, and Meryl Streep)	Nominated	
Set Decorators Society of America Awards	February 22, 2022	Best Achievement in Decor/Design of a Contemporary Feature Film	Tara Pavoni and Clayton Hartley	Nominated	
Society of Composers & Lyricists Awards	March 9, 2022	Outstanding Original Score for a Studio Film	Nicholas Britell	Nominated	
Society of Composers & Lyricists Awards	March 9, 2022	Outstanding Original Song for a Comedy or Musical Visual Media Production	"Just Look Up"	Won	
St. Louis Film Critics Association	December 19, 2021	Best Score	Nicholas Britell	Nominated	
St. Louis Film Critics Association	December 19, 2021	Best Comedy Film	Don't Look Up	Nominated	
Vancouver Film Critics Circle Awards	March 7, 2022	Best Screenplay	Adam McKay and David Sirota	Won	
Writers Guild of America Awards	March 20, 2022	Best Original Screenplay	Adam McKay and David Sirota	Won	

== Analysis and themes ==
The topic of science communication is at the forefront of the film, as it revolves around Mindy and Dibiasky, two scientists, struggling to share the news of their discovery with politicians, talk show hosts, and civilians who are ignorant about the scientific facts of humanity's impending destruction by Comet Dibiasky. Many academic scholars of media and communication have written commentaries that analyze and critique the portrayal of science communication in the film.

=== Americentrism ===
In the Journal of Science Communication, Niels G. Mede writes "the film depicts sharp partisan divides, strong affective polarization, high distrust toward science within certain social milieus, and pronounced news media sensationalism, which have been found to be characteristic of the United States but not, or to a lesser extent, of several countries other than the US." From the same journal, writer Julie Doyle remarked that, "yet, as the film critiques existing structures and systems it does not imagine an alternative set of realities, nor explain the comet's cause. In focusing upon the fictional stories of scientists, politicians, and media celebrities, the film fails to center any marginalized voices, continuing to privilege global north perspectives, even as these are satirised." Doyle comments that "climate communication needs to keep in place both climate mitigation and adaptation, making the historical and structural inequalities of capitalism and colonialism the interconnected stories of both."

=== Media training for scientists ===
One solution to Mindy and Dibiasky's failed attempts to communicate the severity of the impending comet is undergoing media training, which was brought up in the film multiple times, such as at the conference room at the New York Herald where the Chief Editor proposes media training to Mindy before the show. The concept of media training can come in different forms. Samer Angelone, in a commentary journal on science communication, writes, "The style that scientists use to communicate science to peer scientists is mostly objective, complex, and full of technical jargon, which is difficult for the general public to connect to—even if it is in the same language." Another way to mitigate science skepticism is through storytelling. Mede writes, "The film also illustrates that storytelling can be a promising strategy to mitigate these reservations ... showing how Mindy is advised before a TV interview that he is 'just telling a story' and must 'keep it simple.'"

=== Gendered emotions in scientific communication ===
Gendered discourse on emotions and mental health make its way into the film through the portrayal of the public's reaction to Mindy and Dibiasky's various media appearances. The scientists share their discovery on a morning talk show, The Daily Rip, in which Dibiasky has an emotional outburst over the show hosts' persistent attempts to sugarcoat the devastating news of the doomsday comet. Professor of media and communication Julie Doyle writes, "Gendered norms affect Mindy and Dibiasky's public credibility and the mitigatory comet actions they promote. Following his own emotional outburst on TV, Mindy is subsequently recuperated through processes of celebritisation ... hailed as a 'sexy' scientist offering rational and calm advice to the viewers; becoming chief science advisor to the White House to monitor the drone activities of tech billionaire Peter Isherwell; and embarking on a sexual affair with Evantee. In contrast, Dibiasky is discredited and side-lined from rational public commentary through (climate) memes."

=== Easter eggs ===
Throughout the film, many historic figures from science and politics can be spotted, adding to the film's nuanced discussion about the relationship between science and politics.

The opening scene of the film features a figure of Carl Sagan on Dibiasky's desk. In a journal commentary for Science Communication, Samer Angelone writes that "Sagan was an astronomer, planetary scientist, cosmologist, astrophysicist, and astrobiologist but, above all, he was an upholder of scientific credibility and communication." Sagan advocated for the urgency to battle climate change, and many viewers see the film as an allegory for him, but his image is juxtaposed by a painting of George W. Bush, "who later tried to downplay this urgency." The film also "references the affinity of anti-science resentment and populism, showing how President Orlean and her team slander Mindy and Dibiasky using populist rhetoric ... and gather in an Oval Office that has a portrait of the anti-establishment science skeptic Andrew Jackson."

The film ends with a scene that reflects the Last Supper. Dr. Mindy, his family, Kate, Yule, and Teddy all sit around a dinner table and engage in a hand-held prayer, spoken by Yule. After the prayer, Kate Dibiasky gives Yule a kiss, and moments later Comet Dibiasky destroys Earth.

== See also ==
- Double Asteroid Redirection Test – a real NASA mission to test deflection of an asteroid in 2022
- Climate change in popular culture
- Impact events in fiction
