= Hollywood Music in Media Award for Best Original Score in a Feature Film =

Annual award in motion picture industry

Hollywood Music in Media for Best Original Score in a Feature Film
- Country: United States
- Presented by: Hollywood Music in Media Awards (HMMA)
- First award: 2014
- Currently held by: Ludwig Göransson; The Odyssey (2026)
- Website: www.hmmawards.com

The Hollywood Music in Media Award for Best Original Score in a Feature Film is one of the awards given annually to people working in the motion picture industry by the Hollywood Music in Media Awards (HMMA).

== History ==
It is presented to the composers who have composed the best "original" score, written specifically for a motion picture. The award was first given in 2014, during the fifth annual awards.

== Winners and nominees ==
=== 2010s ===
Year	Film	Nominees
(2014); 5th
(2014); 5th	Birdman	Antonio Sánchez
(2014); 5th	Fury	Steven Price
(2014); 5th	Gone Girl	Trent Reznor & Atticus Ross
(2014); 5th	The Imitation Game	Alexandre Desplat
(2014); 5th	Interstellar	Hans Zimmer
(2014); 5th	The Judge	Thomas Newman
(2014); 5th	The Theory of Everything	Jóhann Jóhannsson
(2015); 6th
(2015); 6th	Beasts of No Nation	Dan Romer
(2015); 6th	Bridge of Spies	Thomas Newman
(2015); 6th	Carol	Carter Burwell
(2015); 6th	Sicario	Jóhann Jóhannsson
(2015); 6th	Steve Jobs	Daniel Pemberton
(2015); 6th	The Walk	Alan Silvestri
(2016); 7th
(2016); 7th	Moonlight	Nicholas Britell
(2016); 7th	Birth of a Nation	Henry Jackman
(2016); 7th	Hacksaw Ridge	Rupert Gregson-Williams
(2016); 7th	Jackie	Mica Levi
(2016); 7th	La La Land	Justin Hurwitz
(2016); 7th	Lion	Dustin O'Halloran and Hauschka
(2017); 8th
(2017); 8th	Good Time	Oneohtrix Point Never
(2017); 8th	Battle of the Sexes	Nicholas Britell
(2017); 8th	Darkest Hour	Dario Marianelli
(2017); 8th	The Man Who Invented Christmas	Mica Levi
(2017); 8th	Mudbound	Tamar-kali
(2017); 8th	Wonderstruck	Carter Burwell
(2017); 8th	Victoria and Abdul	Thomas Newman
(2018); 9th
(2018); 9th	Mary Queen of Scots	Max Richter
(2018); 9th	The Ballad of Buster Scruggs	Carter Burwell
(2018); 9th	BlacKkKlansman	Terence Blanchard
(2018); 9th	Destroyer	Theodore Shapiro
(2018); 9th	First Man	Justin Hurwitz
(2018); 9th	Green Book	Kris Bowers
(2018); 9th	If Beale Street Could Talk	Nicholas Britell
(2018); 9th	The Sisters Brothers	Alexandre Desplat
(2018); 9th	Widows	Hans Zimmer
(2019); 10th
(2019); 10th	Ford v Ferrari (tie)	Marco Beltrami & Buck Sanders
(2019); 10th	Joker (tie)	Hildur Guðnadóttir
(2019); 10th	Harriet	Terence Blanchard
(2019); 10th	Jojo Rabbit	Michael Giacchino
(2019); 10th	The King	Nicholas Britell
(2019); 10th	Little Women	Alexandre Desplat
(2019); 10th	Marriage Story	Randy Newman
(2019); 10th	Motherless Brooklyn	Daniel Pemberton
(2019); 10th	Pain & Glory	Alberto Iglesias
(2019); 10th	Parasite	Jung Jae-il
(2019); 10th	Uncut Gems	Oneohtrix Point Never

=== 2020s ===
Year	Film	Nominees
(2020); 11th
(2020); 11th	News of the World	James Newton Howard
(2020); 11th	Da 5 Bloods	Terence Blanchard
(2020); 11th	The Life Ahead	Gabriel Yared
(2020); 11th	Mank	Trent Reznor & Atticus Ross
(2020); 11th	Ma Rainey's Black Bottom	Branford Marsalis
(2020); 11th	The Midnight Sky	Alexandre Desplat
(2020); 11th	Pieces of a Woman	Howard Shore
(2020); 11th	The Trial of the Chicago 7	Daniel Pemberton
(2021); 12th
(2021); 12th	Don't Look Up	Nicholas Britell
(2021); 12th	The French Dispatch	Alexandre Desplat
(2021); 12th	King Richard	Kris Bowers
(2021); 12th	The Last Duel	Harry Gregson-Williams
(2021); 12th	Nightmare Alley	Nathan Johnson
(2021); 12th	No Time to Die	Hans Zimmer
(2021); 12th	The Power of the Dog	Jonny Greenwood
(2021); 12th	Stillwater	Mychael Danna
(2021); 12th	The Tragedy of Macbeth	Carter Burwell
(2022) 13th
(2022) 13th	The Woman King	Terence Blanchard
(2022) 13th	Emancipation	Marcelo Zarvos
(2022) 13th	Empire of Light	Trent Reznor and Atticus Ross
(2022) 13th	She Said	Nicholas Britell
(2022) 13th	The Banshees of Inisherin	Carter Burwell
(2022) 13th	Till	Abel Korzeniowski
(2022) 13th	Where the Crawdads Sing	Mychael Danna
(2022) 13th	White Noise	Danny Elfman
(2022) 13th	Women Talking	Hildur Guðnadóttir
(2023) 14th
(2023) 14th	Killers of the Flower Moon	Robbie Robertson (posthumously)
(2023) 14th	American Fiction	Laura Karpman
(2023) 14th	Chevalier	Kris Bowers
(2023) 14th	Nyad	Alexandre Desplat
(2023) 14th	Oppenheimer	Ludwig Göransson
(2023) 14th	Rustin	Branford Marsalis
(2023) 14th	Saltburn	Anthony Willis
(2023) 14th	The Killer	Trent Reznor and Atticus Ross
(2024) 15th
(2024) 15th	Emilia Pérez	Clément Ducol & Camille
(2024) 15th	Blitz	Hans Zimmer
(2024) 15th	Challengers	Trent Reznor & Atticus Ross
(2024) 15th	Conclave	Volker Bertelmann
(2024) 15th	Gladiator II	Harry Gregson-Williams
(2024) 15th	Horizon: An American Saga – Chapter 1	John Debney
(2024) 15th	Saturday Night	Jon Batiste
(2024) 15th	The Six Triple Eight	Aaron Zigman
(2025) 16th
(2025) 16th	Sinners	Ludwig Göransson
(2025) 16th	Frankenstein	Alexandre Desplat
(2025) 16th	Marty Supreme	Daniel Lopatin
(2025) 16th	F1	Hans Zimmer
(2025) 16th	Bugonia	Jerskin Fendrix
(2025) 16th	Wicked: For Good	John Powell and Stephen Schwartz
(2025) 16th	One Battle After Another	Jonny Greenwood
(2025) 16th	Hamnet	Max Richter
(2025) 16th	A House of Dynamite	Volker Bertelmann
(2026); 17th
(2026); 17th	The Odyssey	Ludwig Göransson
(2026); 17th	Artificial	Damon Albarn
(2026); 17th	Behemoth!	The Behemoth! Collective
(2026); 17th	Heart of the Beast	Jared Michael Fry
(2026); 17th	Tenzing	Rebekka Karijord
(2026); 17th	Wild Horse Nine	Carter Burwell
(2026); 17th	Your Mother Your Mother Your Mother	Son Lux
