= Nicholas Britell =

American film composer (born 1980)

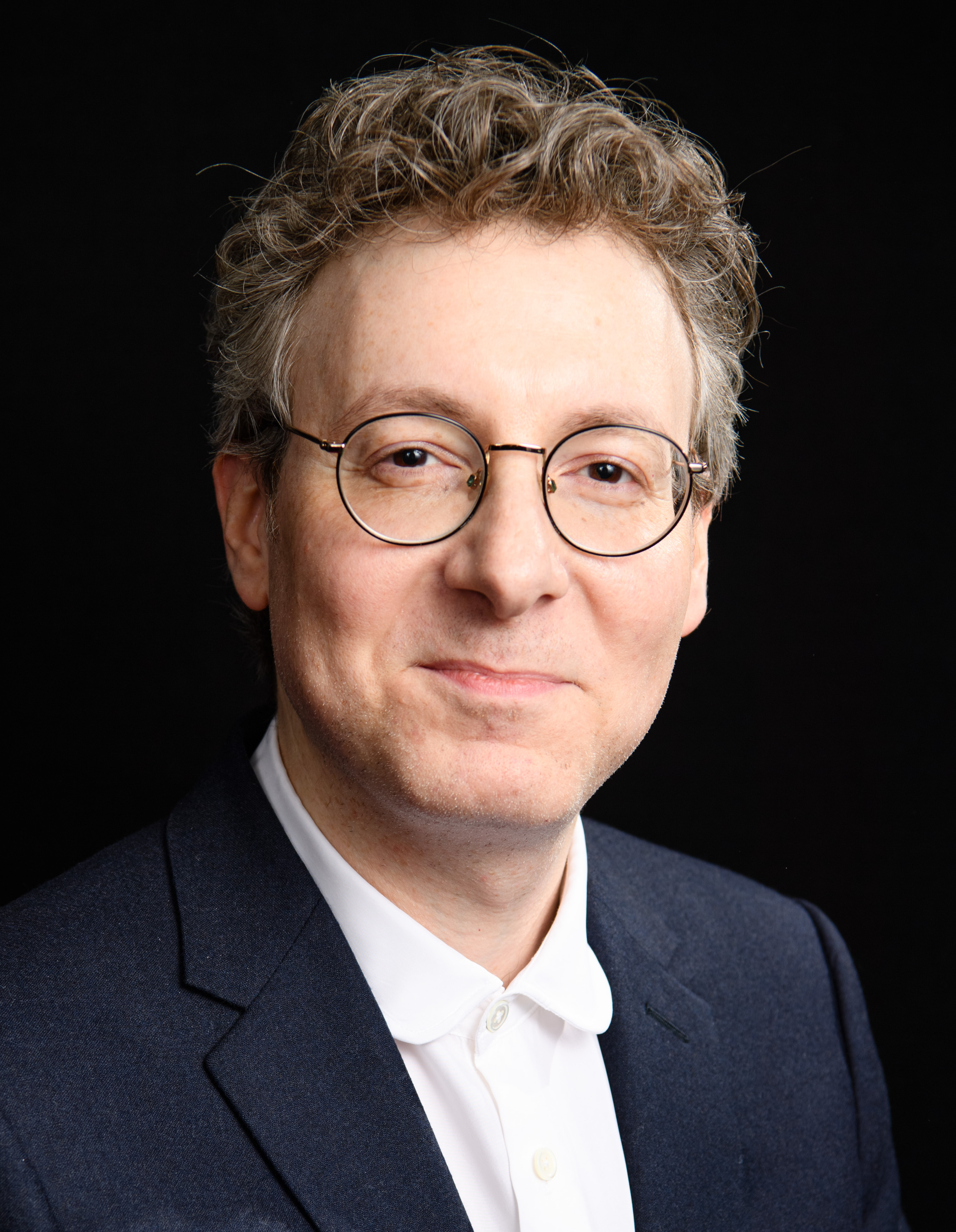
- Britell in 2025
- Born: October 17, 1980 (age 45); New York City, New York, U.S.
- Education: New Canaan Country School; Hopkins School; Juilliard School; Harvard University
- Occupation: Film composer
- Spouse: Caitlin Sullivan
- Musical career
- Genres: Film and television scores; electronic; jazz

Nicholas Britell (born October 17, 1980) is an American film and television composer. He has received numerous accolades including an Emmy Award as well as nominations for three Academy Awards and a Grammy Award. He has received Academy Award nominations for Best Original Score for Moonlight (2016), If Beale Street Could Talk (2018), and Don't Look Up (2021). He also scored The Big Short (2015) and Vice (2018). He is also known for scoring Battle of the Sexes (2017), The King (2019), Cruella (2021), season 1 of Andor (2022), She Said (2022), and Jay Kelly (2025).

The soundtrack for HBO original series Succession (2018–2023) marked Britell's entry into television. Britell scored all four seasons, earning the Emmy Award for Outstanding Original Main Title Theme Music in 2019. His scores for the second, third, and fourth seasons of Succession each earned Primetime Emmy Award for Outstanding Music Composition for a Series nominations in 2020, 2022, and 2023. His score for The Underground Railroad was nominated for the Primetime Emmy Award for Outstanding Music Composition for a Limited or Anthology Series, Movie or Special in 2021.

His works, as described by Soraya McDonald of Film Comment, "seem to organically straddle accessibility and sophistication in a way that goes beyond the typical programming of a big-city pops orchestra...That might have something to do with the fact that Britell has long had one foot in the world of hip-hop and another in the world of classical music."

== Early life and education ==
Britell was raised in a Jewish family in New York City. He attended New Canaan Country School in New Canaan, CT, and he graduated valedictorian from the college preparatory school Hopkins School in 1999. Britell is a graduate of the Juilliard School's Pre-College Division and a Phi Beta Kappa graduate of Harvard College in 2003. At school, he was a member of the Signet Society, as well as the instrumental hip-hop group, The Witness Protection Program, in which he played keyboards and synthesizers. He briefly worked at Bear Stearns after graduating.

Britell is part of an emerging generation of composers and artists who draw from an eclectic range of influences. His work is inspired by Rachmaninoff, Gershwin, Philip Glass, Zbigniew Preisner, Quincy Jones and Dr. Dre.

== Career ==
=== Early career ===
In 2008, Britell gained wide notice performing his own work "Forgotten Waltz No. 2" in Natalie Portman's directorial debut Eve. He collaborated again with Portman, writing music for the film New York, I Love You.

In 2011, Britell performed on piano with violin virtuoso Tim Fain in Portals. The multimedia project also featured performances by Craig Black, Julia Eichten and Haylee Nichele, and featured music by Philip Glass and Nico Muhly, poetry by Leonard Cohen and choreography by Benjamin Millepied. Regarding this collaboration, Vogue called Britell among "...the most talented young artists at work..."

As a film composer, Britell created the music for the movie Gimme the Loot, directed by Adam Leon. The film would go on to compete in the Un Certain Regard section at the 2012 Cannes Film Festival. It won the Grand Jury Prize at the SXSW Film Festival in 2012. The music for the film garnered special praise from New York Magazine and Variety.

Britell's film composing career continued in 2012 with the scoring of Michele Mitchell's PBS documentary Haiti: Where Did the Money Go? The film, which aired over 1,000 times in the United States on PBS stations and was screened at the Oakland Film Festival and the BolderLife Film Festival in 2012, is the winner of the 2013 Edward R. Murrow Award for Best News Documentary and winner of a 2012 CINE Golden Eagle Award and a CINE Special Jury Award for Best Investigative Documentary.

=== 2012–2015 ===
Britell's music featured prominently in director Steve McQueen's Oscar-winning film 12 Years a Slave, for which he composed and arranged the on-camera music including the spiritual songs, work songs, featured violin performances, and dances. Billboard called Britell "...the secret weapon in the music of 12 Years a Slave". "My Lord Sunshine", composed by Britell for 12 Years a Slave, was eligible for the 2014 Oscars' Best Original Song list. The Los Angeles Times said of "My Lord Sunshine": "A work song, a spiritual, a blues lament, a communal statement – 'My Lord Sunshine (Sunrise)' is all of the above and more...[w]hat Britell accomplished is no easy feat, and it's a spiritual that feels and sounds of the era and deftly weaves in religious imagery with the daily horror of the slaves' lives." Britell also notably reinterpreted "Roll Jordan Roll" for the film. His work received wide critical acclaim and he was profiled in The Wall Street Journal.

As a film producer, Britell produced the short film Whiplash, directed by Damien Chazelle, which won the Short Film Jury Award: US Fiction at the 2013 Sundance Film Festival. He subsequently helped produce the feature-film Whiplash, also directed by Chazelle and starring Miles Teller and J. K. Simmons. The Whiplash feature won the Grand Jury Prize: Dramatic and Audience Award: Dramatic at the 2014 Sundance Film Festival, went on to receive 5 Oscar nominations (including Best Picture), and won 3 Oscar awards. Britell also wrote and produced the track "Reaction," produced the track "When I Wake," and performed and produced "No Two Words" for the film's soundtrack.

In 2015, Britell scored The Seventh Fire, a documentary directed by Jack Pettibone Riccobono and presented by Terrence Malick, which debuted to critical acclaim at the Berlin International Film Festival.

Britell scored Natalie Portman's directorial debut feature film A Tale of Love and Darkness, which screened at the 2015 Cannes Film Festival. Deadline called Britell's score for the film "riveting".

Britell also scored the Oscar-winning The Big Short, directed by Adam McKay, starring Brad Pitt, Christian Bale, Ryan Gosling, and Steve Carell, based on the book The Big Short by Michael Lewis, and released by Paramount in December 2015. In addition, Britell produced the soundtrack album for the film.

=== 2016–2019 ===
In 2016, Britell scored director Gary Ross's Civil-War era historical drama Free State of Jones, starring Matthew McConaughey, Gugu Mbatha-Raw, Mahershala Ali, and Keri Russell. The soundtrack album, produced by Britell, was released June 24, 2016 on Sony Masterworks.

Also in 2016, Britell wrote the original score for the critically acclaimed, Best Picture-winning film Moonlight, directed by Barry Jenkins. Britell's score received a 2017 Academy Award for Best Original Score nomination and it was nominated for a 2017 Golden Globe Award for Best Original Score in the Motion Picture category. A. O. Scott of The New York Times praised Britell's score as "...both surprising and perfect." Britell's original score was described as "... an enthralling collection of music that will linger in your mind and in your heart in much the same way as the film", and named one of the Ten Best Music Moments of 2016 by Brooklyn Magazine. The film's soundtrack album, named one of the top 25 Soundtrack Albums of 2016 on iTunes, was produced by Britell and released by Lakeshore Records, including a special vinyl collectors' edition. Britell's "Middle of the World", from the soundtrack album, was named one of the top 25 Soundtrack Songs of 2016 on iTunes.

Britell scored director Adam Leon's film Tramps in 2016, with Netflix acquiring worldwide distribution rights to the film at the 2016 Toronto International Film Festival.

Britell scored Fox Searchlight's tennis biopic Battle of the Sexes, directed by Jonathan Dayton and Valerie Faris, and released in 2017.

He composed the title song from Christina Aguilera's eighth studio album Liberation (2018).

In 2018, Britell once again collaborated with Barry Jenkins, scoring his film If Beale Street Could Talk. The film received wide critical acclaim and Britell was nominated for awards including the Academy Award for Best Original Score, BAFTA Award for Best Original Music, and Critics' Choice Movie Award for Best Score.

Britell composed the soundtrack of the critically-acclaimed HBO black comedy-drama series Succession (2018–2023), his first time composing for a television series. For Succession's main title theme, Britell won a Primetime Emmy Award for Outstanding Original Main Title Theme Music in 2019. He also received Primetime Emmy nominations for Outstanding Music Composition for a Series in 2020, 2022, and 2023, and a Grammy Award for Best Score Soundtrack for Visual Media nomination in 2023.

In 2019, Britell worked with American rapper, Pusha T, to create a remix of the main title theme for Succession. The song features Pusha T adding rap vocals over the theme song. Britell described the collaboration by saying "If I was going to collaborate with anyone on this track, Pusha T was the dream choice."

=== 2020–present ===
On February 6, 2019, Britell confirmed he was composing the score for Barry Jenkins's The Underground Railroad, an original series on Amazon based on Colson Whitehead's Pulitzer Prize winning novel of the same name. The show premiered on Amazon Video on May 14, 2021 to critical acclaim for both Jenkins and Britell. For his score, Britell received a Primetime Emmy Award nomination for Outstanding Music Composition for a Limited or Anthology Series, Movie or Special at the 73rd Primetime Emmy Awards.

Britell composed the music for Adam McKay's 2021 film Don't Look Up, including the song "Just Look Up" performed by Ariana Grande and Kid Cudi. Britell received a nomination for Best Original Score at the 94th Academy Awards for the score of Don't Look Up. That same year, Britell scored Disney's One Hundred and One Dalmatians live-action spin-off Cruella. At the World Soundtrack Awards, Britell was awarded Film Composer of the Year in 2019 for his scores for Vice and If Beale Street Could Talk and Television Composer of the Year in 2020 for Succession. Britell also won Best Original Song at the 2021 ceremony alongside Florence Welch for "Call Me Cruella", written for Cruella.

On February 16, 2022, it was reported that Britell would be composing the score for the Star Wars streaming series Andor on Disney+.

== Other endeavors ==
Britell is a Steinway Artist and a Creative Associate of the Juilliard School. In December 2018, it was announced that Britell would be a part of Esa-Pekka Salonen's newly formed creative collective "brain trust" as Salonen takes the reins as music director of the San Francisco Symphony.

== Personal life ==
He is married to cellist Caitlin Sullivan.

== Filmography ==
=== As performer ===
Year	Title	Director
2008	Eve	Natalie Portman

=== As composer ===
==== Film ====
Year	Title	Director
2008	New York, I Love You	Natalie Portman
2012	Haiti: Where Did the Money Go	Michele Mitchell
2012	Gimme the Loot	Adam Leon
2013	12 Years a Slave (additional music)	Steve McQueen
2015	The Seventh Fire	Jack Pettibone Riccobono
2015	A Tale of Love and Darkness	Natalie Portman
2015	The Big Short	Adam McKay
2016	Free State of Jones	Gary Ross
2016	Moonlight	Barry Jenkins
2016	Tramps	Adam Leon
2017	Battle of the Sexes	Jonathan Dayton and Valerie Faris
2018	If Beale Street Could Talk	Barry Jenkins
2018	Vice	Adam McKay
2019	The King	David Michôd
2021	Cruella	Craig Gillespie
2021	Italian Studies	Adam Leon
2021	Don't Look Up	Adam McKay
2022	Carmen	Benjamin Millepied
2022	She Said	Maria Schrader
2024	Blitz (additional music)	Steve McQueen
2024	Mufasa: The Lion King (additional music)	Barry Jenkins
2025	Mountainhead	Jesse Armstrong
2025	Jay Kelly	Noah Baumbach

==== Television ====
Year	Title	Notes
2018–2023	Succession	39 episodes
2021	The Underground Railroad	10 episodes
2021–2022	Ziwe	Theme music by
2022	Winning Time: The Rise of the Lakers Dynasty	10 episodes
2022–2025	Andor	14 episodes

=== As producer ===
Year	Title	Director	Notes
2013	Whiplash	Damien Chazelle	Short film
2014	Whiplash	Damien Chazelle	Co-producer

== Awards and nominations ==
Year	Association	Category	Work	Result	Ref.
2016	Academy Awards	Best Original Score	Moonlight	Nominated	
2016	Golden Globe Awards	Best Original Score	Moonlight	Nominated	
2018	Academy Awards	Best Original Score	If Beale Street Could Talk	Nominated	
2018	British Academy Film Awards	Best Original Music	If Beale Street Could Talk	Nominated	
2019	Primetime Emmy Awards	Outstanding Original Main Title Theme Music	Succession	Won	
2020	Primetime Emmy Awards	Outstanding Music Composition for a Series (Original Dramatic Score)	Succession	Nominated	
2021	Academy Awards	Best Original Score	Don't Look Up	Nominated	
2021	British Academy Film Awards	Best Original Music	Don't Look Up	Nominated	
2021	Primetime Emmy Awards	Outstanding Music Composition for a Limited or Anthology Series, Movie or Special (Original Dramatic Score)	The Underground Railroad: "Chapter 2: South Carolina"	Nominated	
2022	Primetime Emmy Awards	Outstanding Music Composition for a Series (Original Dramatic Score)	Succession	Nominated	
2023	Grammy Award	Best Score Soundtrack for Visual Media	Succession	Nominated	
2023	Primetime Emmy Awards	Outstanding Music Composition for a Series (Original Dramatic Score)	Succession	Nominated	
2023	Primetime Emmy Awards	Outstanding Music Composition for a Series (Original Dramatic Score)	Andor	Nominated	
2023	Primetime Emmy Awards	Outstanding Original Main Title Theme Music	Andor	Nominated	
2025	Primetime Emmy Awards	Outstanding Original Music and Lyrics	"We Are the Ghor (Planetary Anthem)" (from Andor – Episode: "Who Are You?")	Nominated	
