= Film at Eleven Media =

Film at Eleven Media, LLC is a documentary production company based out of Brooklyn, New York. Founded in 2008 by Michelle Mitchell and Ed Head, Film at Eleven produces "responsibly rogue" investigative journalism projects, and documentary films "to keep you ahead of the news narrative in a fun, non-partisan and smart way." Their first film, Haiti: Where Did the Money Go? (2012) won the 2013 Edward R. Murrow Award for News Documentary. They are currently in postproduction for The Uncondemned.
