= The Seventh Fire =

- Berlinale 2015 release poster
- Directed by: Jack Pettibone Riccobono
- Produced by: Jack Pettibone Riccobono; Shane Slattery-Quintanilla
- Cinematography: Jack Pettibone Riccobono; Shane Slattery-Quintanilla
- Edited by: Andrew Ford; Michael J. Palmer; Adelaide Papazoglou
- Music by: Nicholas Britell
- Production companies: All Rites Reserved; Sundial Pictures
- Distributed by: Film Movement
- Release dates: February 7, 2015 (Berlinale); July 22, 2016
- Running time: 76 minutes
- Country: United States
- Language: English

The Seventh Fire is a 2015 American documentary film directed by Jack Pettibone Riccobono. The film was presented by executive producer Terrence Malick. The film follows Rob Brown, a Native American gang leader, and his 17-year old protege, Kevin Fineday Jr., on the White Earth Indian Reservation in Minnesota.

When gang leader Rob Brown is sentenced to prison for a fifth time, he must confront his role in bringing violent drug culture into his beloved American Indian community in northern Minnesota. As Rob reckons with his past, his seventeen-year-old protégé, Kevin, dreams of the future: becoming the most powerful and feared Native gangster on the reservation.

The title of the film refers to the Ojibwe Seven fires prophecy.

== Production ==
Director Jack Riccobono first went to the White Earth Indian Reservation in 2006 while working on a short documentary. In 2010, Riccobono returned to the reservation to find someone to talk to about the issue of gang culture migrating from jails and inner cities to isolated native communities, it was on this trip that Riccobono met one of the subjects of the film, Rob Brown.

Shooting for the film began in January 2011. The film required 14 shoots over two and a half years to complete.

Native American filmmaker Chris Eyre joined the production as an executive producer in 2012 when the film was 25% completed with production. Natalie Portman signed on in 2013 and Terrence Malick joined in 2014.

Composer Nicholas Britell began work on the score early in production. A long time collaborator of director Jack Riccobono, the two revisited the music over the three years of production and post. The soundtrack also features tracks by Native rappers Chase Manhattan and Tall Paul, and was released on iTunes on July 22, 2016.

In May 2014, Independent Filmmaker Project (IFP) selected The Seventh Fire for its Independent Filmmaker Labs, an annual yearlong fellowship for first-time feature directors.

== Release ==
The film premiered at the Berlin International Film Festival on February 7, 2015, and received a theatrical release in the United States on July 22, 2016. Film Movement acquired the rights to distribute the film in the United States.Metrodome distributed the film in the United Kingdom on May 13, 2016. The Seventh Fire went on to play in over 50 markets, including New York City, Los Angeles, Chicago, Toronto, Vancouver, Minneapolis, Boston, and San Diego.

The film was selected to screen at the White House on March 24, 2016 as part of President Obama's campaign for criminal justice reform. Main subjects Rob Brown and Kevin Fineday Jr spoke on a panel with federal officials, journalists, and academics including Bill Keller, Editor-in-chief of The Marshall Project, Jamelle Bouie, chief political correspondent for Slate, and Karen Diver, former Special Assistant to the President for Native American Affairs following the screening.

The film has been featured at major cultural and educational institutions across the country, including the Museum of Contemporary Art (Chicago), Annenberg Retreat at Sunnylands, University of Southern California, UCLA Film & Television Archives, Vassar College, Eastman House, University of Nebraska–Lincoln, New York University, and University of Oklahoma.

The film received an exclusive streaming release on Netflix in December 2016.

=== White Earth Stories ===
After the theatrical release of the film, a limited edition book called White Earth Stories was published. The book features stills from the film, poetry composed by main subject Rob Brown during his incarceration, an intro essay by Shannon Kelley of the UCLA Film & TV Archives and original cover art by Midnight Marauder.

=== Accolades ===
Awards
Award	Category	Outcome
Stockholm Film Festival	Best Documentary	Nominated
Santa Fe Independent Film Festival	Best Documentary Feature	Nominated
New Orleans Film Festival	Best Documentary Feature	Nominated
Hot Springs Documentary Film Festival	Best Documentary	Nominated
Hawaii International Film Festival	Halekulani Golden Orchid Award for Documentary Feature	Nominated
East End Film Festival	Best Documentary	Nominated
Palm Springs Film Festival	The John Schlesinger Award	Nominated
DocumentaMadrid	Best Documentary	Nominated
Minneapolis-St. Paul International Film Festival	Best Documentary	Won
Ashland Independent Film Festival	Best Documentary	Won
Big Sky Documentary Film Festival	Best Documentary	Won
Social Impact Media Awards 2016	Best Documentary	Nominated

=== Critical reception ===
The film received positive reviews from critics. The film has a 100% rating from top critics on Rotten Tomatoes.

Richard Brody of The New Yorker called the film "deeply textured...remarkable." The film was awarded a 2016 NYTimes Critics' Pick. The New York Times critic Glenn Kenny wrote, "The betrayal of Native Americans by larger forces looms over this powerful movie without ever being explicitly discussed." Akiva Gottlieb of Documentary magazine praised the film as "a powerful work of social advocacy that pushed its case for criminal justice reform all the way to the White House." The Los Angeles Times's Noel Murray said "The Seventh Fire covers enough ground to function as a character study, an ethnography and a social issue film, all in one. By tackling the larger issue of Native American gangs through the story of two northwest Minnesota drug dealers, Riccobono personalizes a problem that deserves more attention." RogerEbert.com critic Godfrey Cheshire wrote, "Whatever other filmmakers may have had an impact on Riccobono, the film’s indelible depiction of current Native life is an achievement that belongs to him alone."
