= Fond du Lac Band of Lake Superior Chippewa =

Wayekwaa-gichigamiing Gichigamiwininiwag
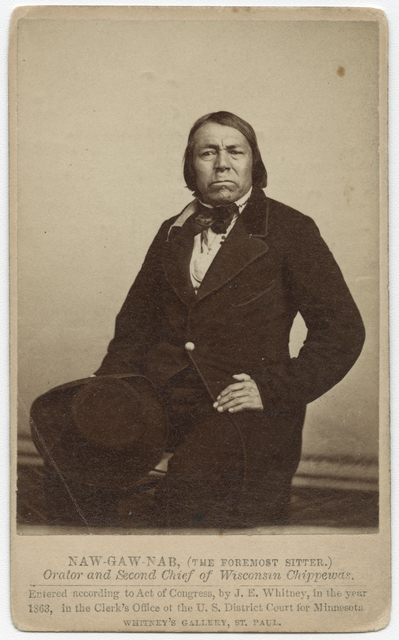
- Fond-du-Lac Chief Naw-gaw-nab or the Foremost sitter taken by photographer Joel Emmons Whitney in 1863

Total population
- 4,044 (2007)

Regions with significant populations
- Minnesota, United States

Languages
- English, Ojibwe

Religion
- Midewiwin, Christianity

Related ethnic groups
- fellow Ojibwes

The Fond du Lac Band of Lake Superior Chippewa (Ojibwe: Wayekwaa-gichigamiing Gichigamiwininiwag, meaning "Lake Superior Men at the far end of the Great Lake") is an Anishinaabe (Ojibwe) band located near Cloquet, Minnesota. Their land base is the Fond du Lac Indian Reservation (Ojibwe: Nagaajiwanaang), located mainly in Carlton and Saint Louis Counties, Minnesota, 20 miles west of Duluth.

The Fond du Lac Ojibwe are one of six bands who comprise the federally recognized Minnesota Chippewa Tribe, which was organized in 1934 with a new constitution under the Indian Reorganization Act. In July 2007, their enrolled members numbered 4,044.

== History ==
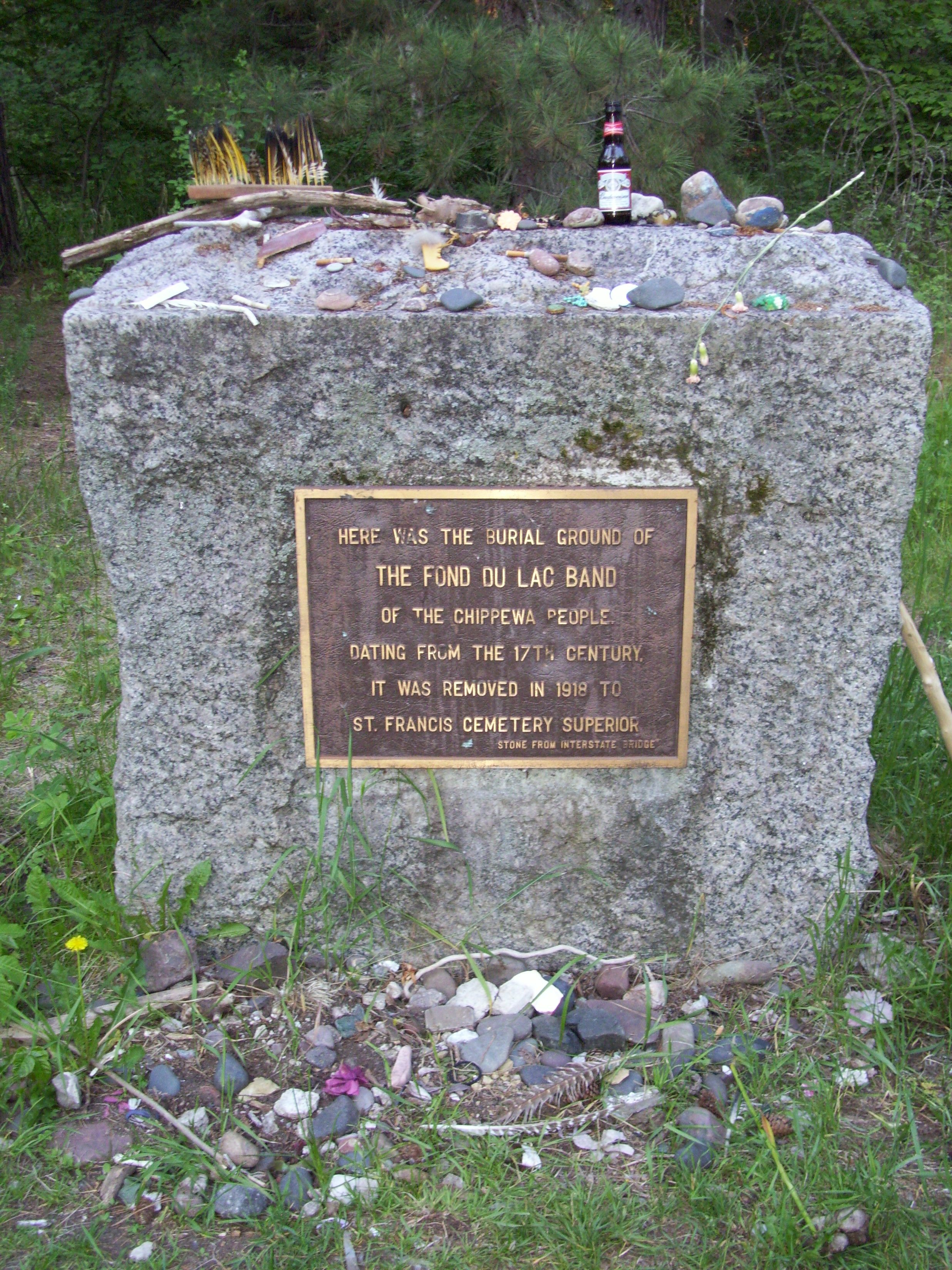
The former Fond du Lac ancestral burial site at Wisconsin Point in Superior, Wisconsin

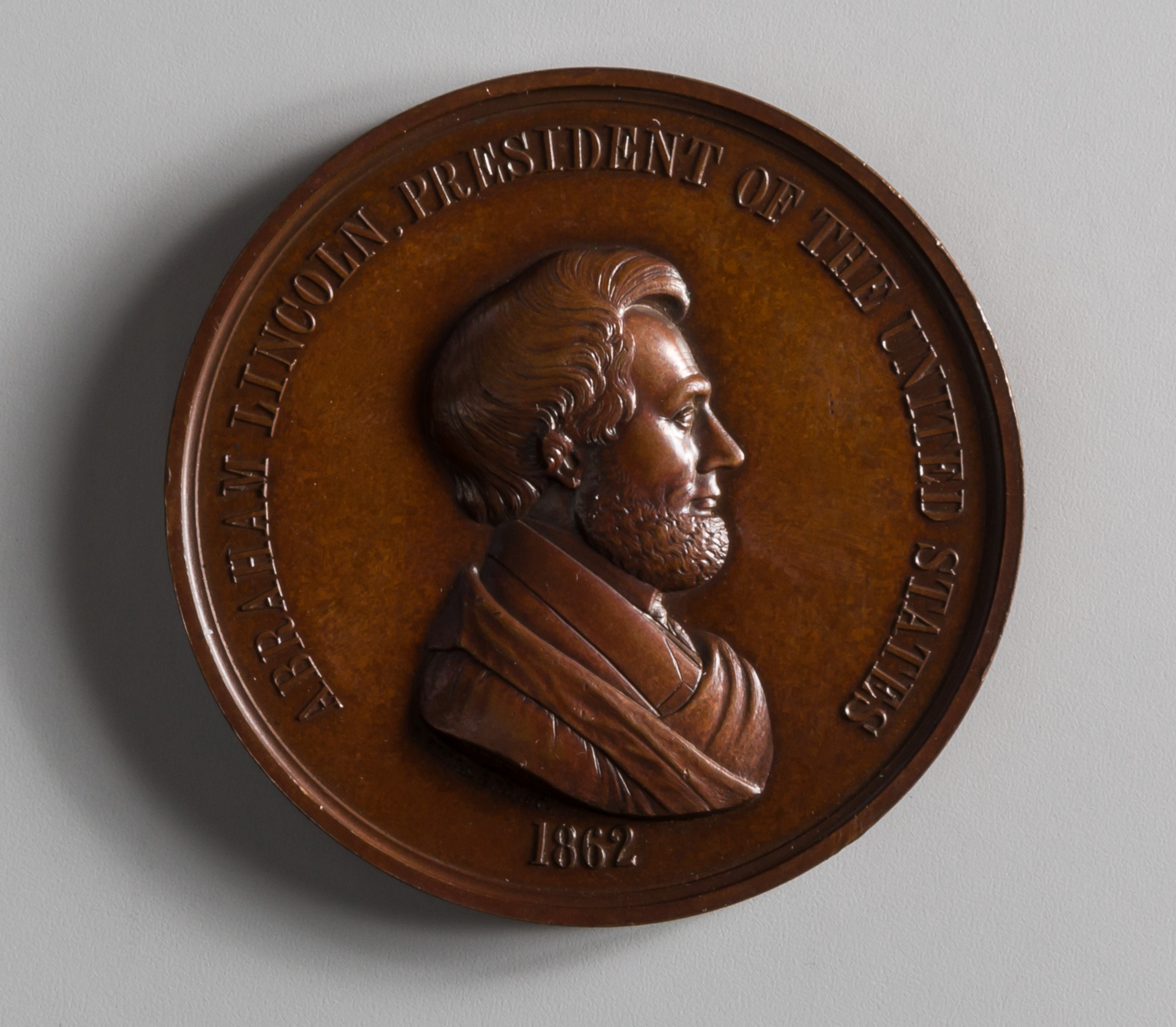
1862 Lincoln Peace Medal, in bronze. A few months before the Mdewakanton Uprising. Lincoln gave 9 Lake Superior Chippewa Chiefs, the large 3 inch silver version of this medal. The Chiefs included: Ah-moose, or "Little Bee", Lac-Flambeau band; Kish-ke-taw-ug, or "Cut Ear", Bad-River band; Ba-quas, or "He Sews", Lac-Court-O'Rielles band; Ah-do-ga-zik, or "Last Day", Bad-River band; O-be-qnot, or "Firm", Fond-du-Lac band; Shing-quak-onse, or "Little Pine", La-Pointe band; Ja-ge-gwa-yo, or "Can't Tell", La-Pointe band; Na-gon-an(Naw-Gaw-Nub), or "He Sits Ahead", Fond-du-Lac band; and O-ma-shin-a-way, or "Messenger", Bad-River band.

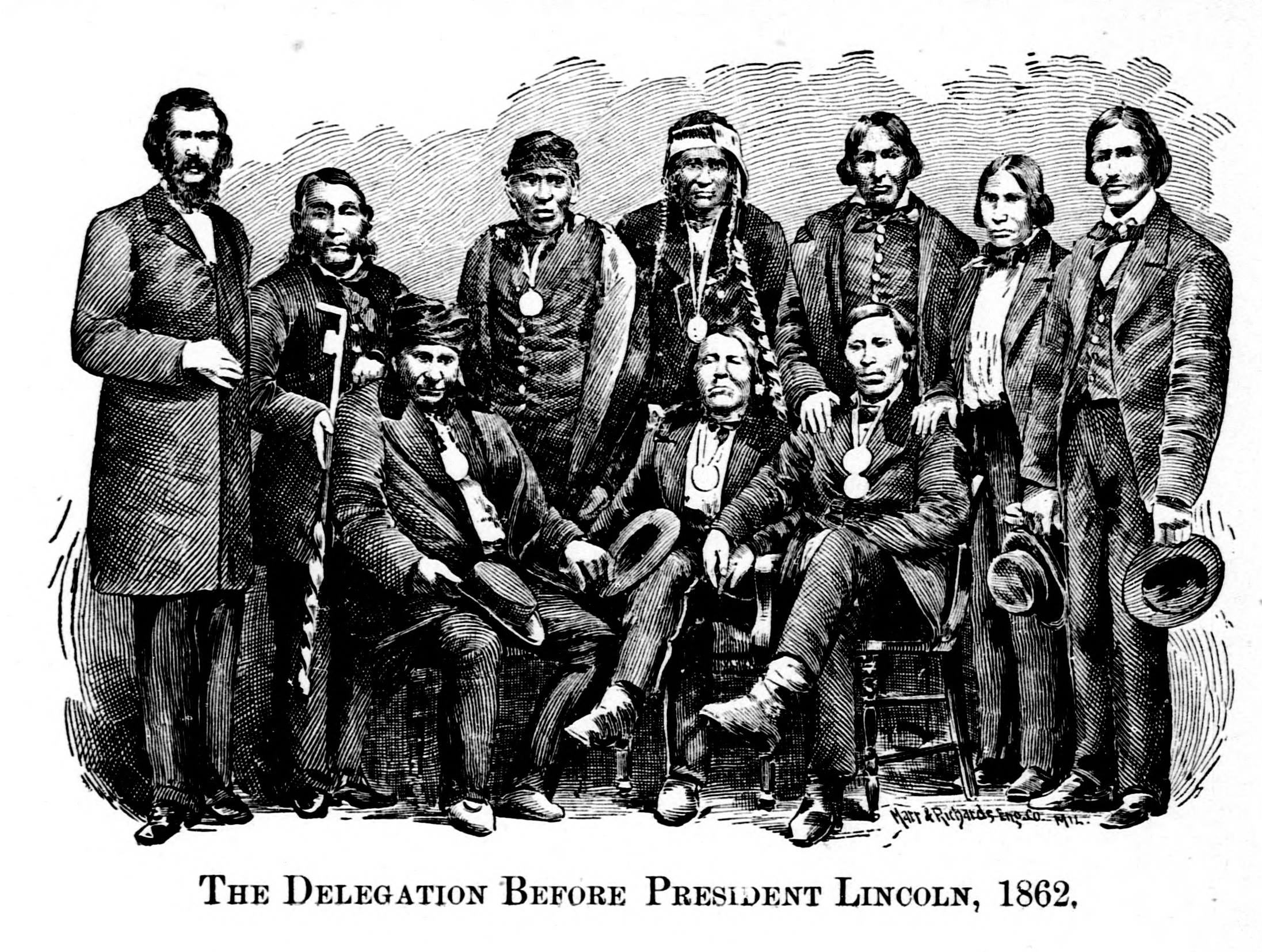
1862 Chippewa Delegation wearing the medals President Lincoln had just given them. Chief Na-gon-an(Naw-Gaw-Nub), or "He Sits Ahead", (FDL) seated center, sent a letter to Lincoln offering Chippewa assistance with the Sioux problem a couple of months later. His positioning in the photo indicates his status.

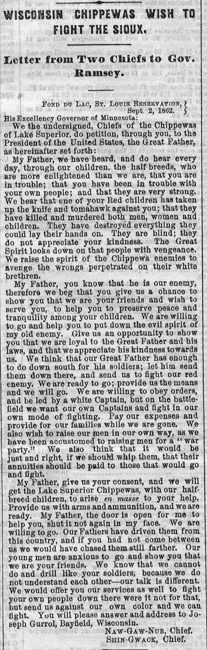
The FDL letter instructs send reply to: Joseph Gurrol/Gurnoe (Shing-wāk-onse) at Bayfield Wisconsin. He was the Red Cliff band translator who transcribed for the FDL Chiefs.

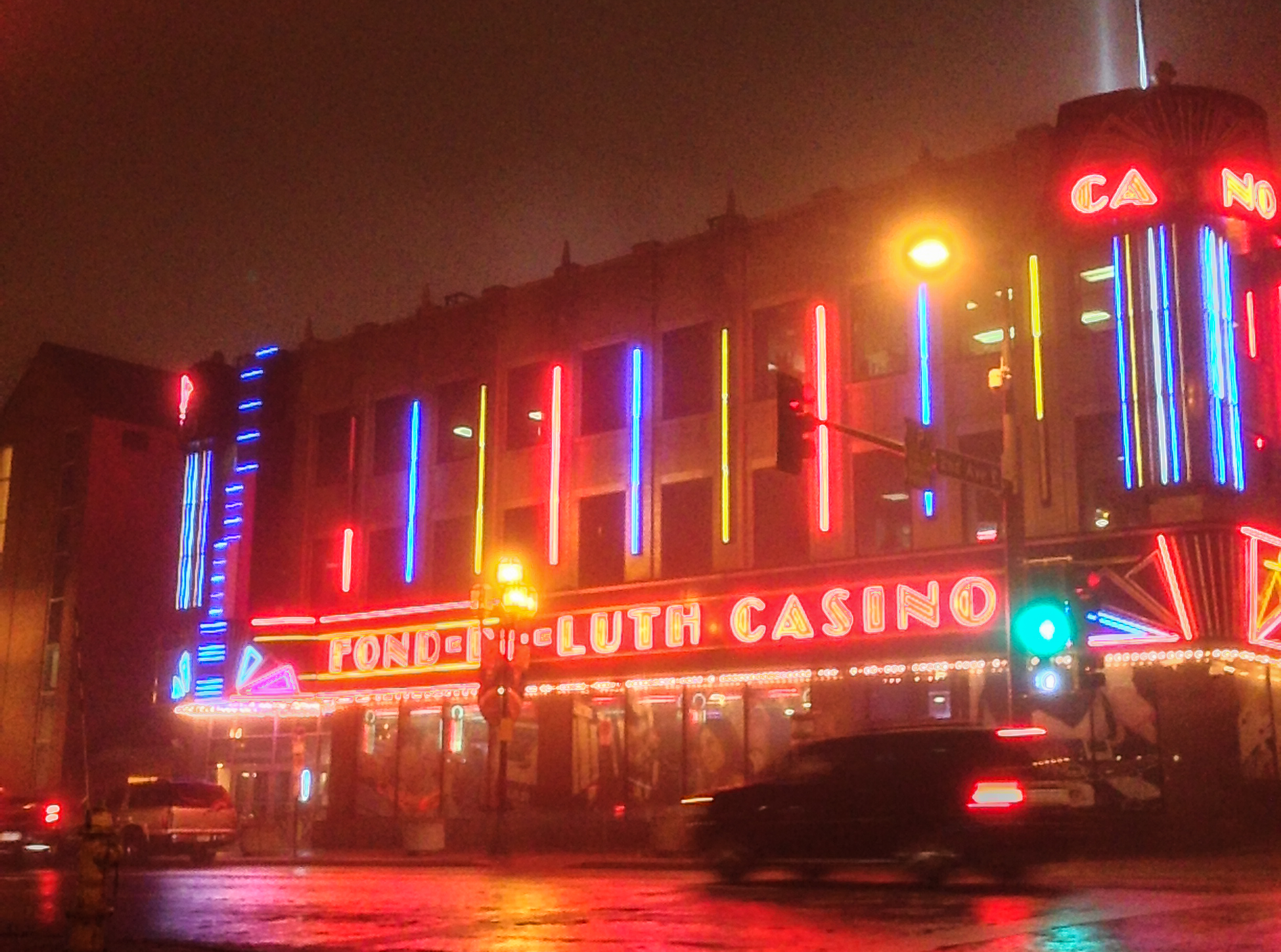
Fond-du-Luth Casino, Duluth

The Fond du Lac Band of Lake Superior Chippewa originally inhabited the area along the lower courses of the Saint Louis River, where the present-day cities of Duluth, Minnesota and Superior, Wisconsin developed. The Wayekwaa-gichigamiing Gichigamiwininiwag controlled the river access to both the Saint Louis and the Nemadji River rivers, major trade-routes during the decades of the fur trade with European traders. In the same area is Spirit Island of the "Sixth Stopping Place", one of the former seven Anishinaabe administrative centers.

The Fond du Lac Band's regional economic influence helped establish the American Fur Company's trading post in what now is the Fond du Lac neighborhood of Duluth. Two different Treaties of Fond du Lac were signed by the Fond du Lac Band. In 1848 Chief Naw-Gaw-Nub made his first trip to Washington and addressed the U.S. Senate "with regard to what relations should be between the whites and the Indians". In December 1861 a special Indian interpreter in Bayfield organized a trip to Washington D.C. for nine Chippewa Chiefs to meet President Lincoln. The Fond Du Lac band sent two, Chief Naw-Gaw-Nub (he sits ahead) and Chief O-be-quot (Firm). Lincoln gave all a President's Medal with his image dated 1862. There exists a photo of the delegation attributed to Matthew Brady with Chief Naw-Gaw-Nub seated center. There are multiple spellings for Chief Naw-Gaw-Nub's name owing to Americans having difficulty pronouncing the Ojibwe language: Naaganab, Naw-Gaw-Nab, Na-Gon-Nub or Na-Gon-Ab.

On September 2, 1862, a letter was sent from the Fond Du Lac St. Louis Reservation to Governor Alexander Ramsey. Chief Naw-Gaw-Nub and Chief Shin-Gwack (Zhin-gob) requested that the Governor relay to Lincoln that the Fond du Lac Chippewa wanted to help with the Sioux Uprising. They understood that Lincoln needed Minnesotans to fight the south and they "begged" that the Chippewa be offered the opportunity to "help put down the evil spirit of their old enemy" who had "murdered men, women, and children." All they asked was "that the weapons be provided and that their family's be taken care of while they were gone". They also offered to accept a "white" commander as long as they were allowed to use traditional Chippewa methods in battle". The letter made the newspapers in St Paul on September 13 and 19, 1862, It also made the news in papers across the country. A few days later the Head Chief of the Mille Lacs Band took 700-750 warriors made the same offer at Fort Ripley and offered to defend the fort from a rumored attack by Hole in the Day.

Newspapers that published the Fond-du-Lac Chief's letter to Lincoln(complete text) offering to fight the Sioux:

- FDL letter paraphrased, Grant County Witness 8 Sept 1862, p. 2, Newspapers.com, 2023
- The Chicago Times 16 Sept 1862 (Fond du Lac Band of Chippewa reservation archives)
- The Chicago Daily Tribune. 17 Sept 1862, p. 1 Newspapers.com, 2023
- Quad-City Times, 18 Sept 1862, p. 2, Newspapers.com, 2023
- Daily Democrat and News, Sept 18, 1862, 2023, p. 2, Library of Congress, 2024
- The Weekly Pioneer and Democrat, 19 Sept 1862, p. 3, 2023, Minnesota digital Newspaper Hub, 2024 MNHS,
- The Cleveland Morning Leader, 20 Sept 1862, p. 1, Library of Congress, 2023
- Burlington Hawkeye, Sept 20, 1862, p. 3, Library of Congress, 2023
- The Brooklyn Daily Eagle, 23 Sept 1862(New York), p. 1, Newspapers.com, 2023
- The Vermont Chronicle, 23 Sept, 1862, p. 3 Newspapers.com, 2024
- The Waukegan Weekly Gazette, Sep 20, 1862 p. 1, Newspapers.com, 2024
- The Manitowoc Herald, Sep 25, 1862 p. 1, Newspapers.com, 2024
- Baltimore Wecker Vol. 13, No. 225, Sept 20, 1862, p. 2, Library of Congress, 2023

Newspapers that published the Fond-du-Lac Chief's Lincoln letter as stub articles:

- An Offer of Aid from the Chippewas., New York Times, Sept. 14, 1862, p. 9, ProQuest Historical Newspapers, 2023
- 2 Wisconsin Chippewa Chiefs, The New York Herald, Sept 14, 1862, p. 5, Library of Congress, 2023
- Mankato Semi-weekly Record, Sept. 13, 1862, p. 2, Minnesota Digital Newspapers hub, 2023, MNHS 345 Kellogg Blvd, St. Paul MN.
- The Evening StarVol. XX No.2983, Washington D.C., Sept. 15, 1862, p. 1, Library of Congress, 2023
- The Chicago Tribune, Sept. 15, 1862, Library of Congress, 2023
- The Pittsburgh Gazette, 15 Sept. 1862, p. 3, Newspapers.com, 2023
- The Portland Daily Press, 15 Sept, 1862, p. 3, Library of Congress, 2023
- The Daily Gate City Vol. 9 No.170, Sept 15, 1862, p. 3, Keokuk, Iowa, Library of Congress, 2023
- Hartford Courant,(Mass.) 15 Sept 1862, p. 3, Newspapers.com, 2023
- The Daily Evansville Journal Sept 15, 1862, p. 3, Library of Congress, 2023
- Daily Intelligencer Vol. XI No. 20, 15 Sept 1862, p. 3, (Wheeling, West Virginia), Library of Congress, 2023
- Worcester Daily Spy (Massachusetts), Sept 15, 1862, p. 3, Library of Congress, 2023
- Daily State Sentinel Vol. X, No. 3730, Sept 15, 1862, p. 3, Library of Congress, 2023
- Bangor Daily Whig and Courier (Maine), 15 Sept 1862, p. 3, Newspapers.com,
- The Pittsburgh Gazette, 15 Sept 1862, p. 3, Newspapers.com, 2023
- The Evansville Daily Journal(Indiana), 15 Sept 1862, p. 3, Newspapers.com, 2023
- The Buffalo Commercial, 15 Sept 1862, p. 1, Newspapers.com, 2023
- The Kingston Daily News 16 Sept 1862, p. 2,(Kingston, Ontario, Canada), Newspapers.com, 2023
- The Weekly North Iowa Times, Vol. VI, No.309, 17 Sept, Library of Congress. 2023
- Lewiston Falls Journal(Maine), 18 Sept 1862, p. 2, Newspapers.com, 2023
- The Philadelphia Inquirer 18 Sept 1862, p. 4, Newspapers.com, 2023 Mule-de-Sack(sp=Fond du Lac)
- Muscatine Weekly Journal, Vol. XIV, No.12, Sept 19, 1862, p. 4, Library of Congress, 2023
- The Smoky Hill and Republican Union 27 Sep 1862, p. 2, Newspapers.com, 2023
- Saunders's News-Letter, Dublin, Ireland, 29 Sept 1862, p. 2 The British Newspaper Archives, 2023
- The Leeds Mercury 30 Sept 1862, p. 4 (Leeds, West Yorkshire, England), Newspapers.com, 2023
- Newry Examiner and Louth Advertiser, North Ireland, 1 Oct 1862, British Newspaper Archives, 2023
- Dublin Mercantile Advertiser, and Weekly Price Current, Dublin, Ireland 3 Oct 1862, The British Newspaper Archives
- Indiana State Sentinel Vol. XXII No. 17, Library of Congress, 2023

In January 1863 the Chiefs made a return trip to Washington. On the way they spent a little time in Chicago. During that time they were shown the Union prisoner of war camp adjacent to the Illinois Central rail line Camp Douglas. During their tour Chief Naw-Gaw-Nub lectured the rebels: "you have been fighting to break up this government like the bloody Sioux." was one admonishment he laid on them. On their return they traveled via New York and had a meeting with a Mic-Mac Chief/medicine man to obtain medicine to bring home. Word had spread that the Mic-Mac had a cure for smallpox. Joseph Gurrol/Gurnoe is again mentioned as being with FDL.

Chief Naganab's passing made the New York Times in 1897.

== Demographics ==
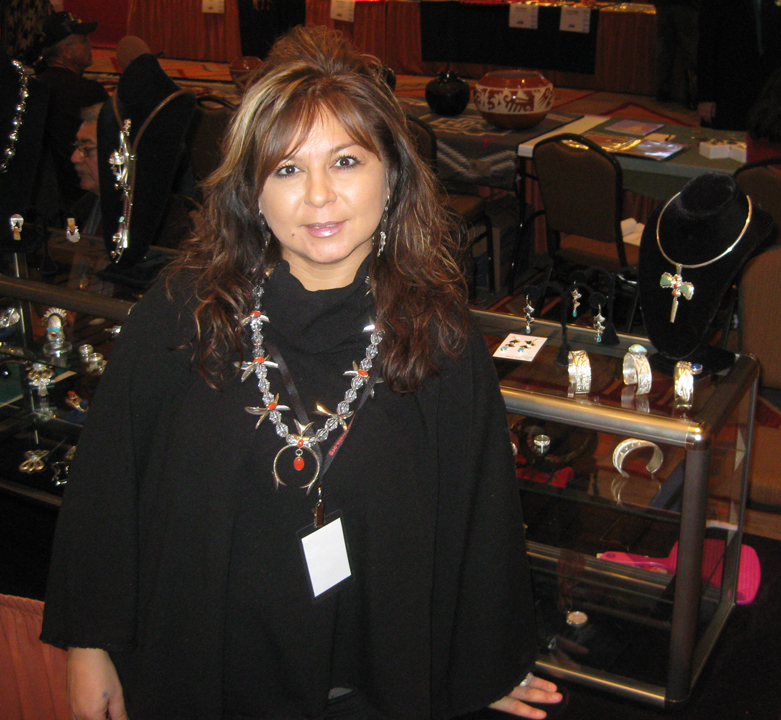
Wanesia Spry Misquadace (Fond du Lac Ojibwe), jeweler and birchbark biter, 2011

The largest community on the reservation is the city of Cloquet, of which only the sparsely populated western half of the city is on reservation land. As of 2000, that part has a population of 1,204 persons out of the city's total of 11,201. The only community completely on the reservation is Brookston, at the reservation's northern end.

== Economy ==
The Band operates two casinos, the Fond du Luth Casino in Duluth and the Black Bear Casino Resort on the reservation. An agreement signed with the City of Duluth, in which property within city limits was given to the tribe to build the Fond du Luth Casino in return for profit sharing $6 million, approximately 20%, from slot machine gross revenue, was agreed upon in 1994. Profits are no longer shared with the city due to violation of the Indian Gaming Regulatory Act. The band has prevailed in court.

On August 31, 2018, the Band reached an agreement to let Enbridge build its Line 3 replacement pipeline across the Reservation. The agreement extended Enbridge's rights of way on the Reservation by 10 years, to 2039. The financial terms of the agreement were not disclosed.

The arrival of twelve American bison was celebrated in November 2022 which had been absent from the reservation since they nearly went extinct in the late 1800s. The Nature Conservancy provided the animals, known scientifically as bison, to a native-owned and operated business from one of their preserves in Nebraska with transportation assistance from the Tanka Fund. They were welcomed with a prayer, a song, and a community meal as buffalo have a cultural and a spiritual connection to indigenous communities. The Conservancy and the Tanka Fund support an effort to enrich Native lives with the re-establishment of a sustainable buffalo economy.

== Government ==
The revised Constitution and By-Laws of the Minnesota Chippewa Tribe were approved by the Secretary of Interior on March 3, 1964. The governing body of the Fond du Lac Indian Reservation is the Reservation Business Committee, which is composed of a Chairman, Secretary-Treasurer, and three Representatives: one from District I (Cloquet), one from District II (Sawyer) and one from District III (Brookston). All are elected to four-year terms on a staggered basis, with the Chairman and Secretary-Treasurer also serving as members of the Executive Committee of the Minnesota Chippewa Tribe.

The current members of the Reservation Business Committee are:

- Chairperson: Kevin Dupuis Sr.
- Secretary/Treasurer: Robert Abramowski
- District-I Representative: Wally Dupuis
- District-II Representative: Brad "Raff" Blacketter
- District-III Representative/Vice Chairperson: Roger Smith Sr.

Fond du Lac Band of Lake Superior Chippewa is one of six members of the Minnesota Chippewa Tribe (MCT), from which it receives certain administrative services and support. The tribal government issues its own license plates. In the 2020 United States Census, the reservation recorded a population of 4,184 people and in July, 2007, MCT reported 4,044 people enrolled through Fond du Lac.

== Education ==
In 1987, the Band opened Fond du Lac Tribal and Community College. For the 2021-2022 school year, there were 1,648 students enrolled, 9.5% of whom were Indigenous.

== Notable members ==
- Karen Diver - Former special assistant to President Barack Obama on Native American affairs
- William Houle - Chairman of the Fond du Lac Band from 1974 to 1988
- Jim Northrup - Author, and "Fond du Lac Follies" columnist
- Thomas David Petite - Inventor
- Joe Pappio - Professional Football Player Chicago Cardinals, Oorang Indians (Jim Thorpe Coach) also played college football at Haskell Indian Nations University.

== See also ==
- Minnesota Indian Affairs Council
