= Thomas David Petite =

American inventor (born 1956)

T. David Petite
- Born: Thomas David Petite; May 30, 1956; Atlanta, Georgia, U.S.
- Citizenship: American / Native American of the Fond du Lac Band of Lake Superior Chippewa
- Known for: Inventor of the technology associated with the development of the Smart Grid
- Spouse: Candida Stevens

Thomas David Petite (born May 30, 1956) is an American inventor. He is Native American and a member of the Fond du Lac Band of Lake Superior Chippewa tribe. He is also a founder of the Native American Intellectual Property Enterprise Council, a non-profit organization helping Native American inventors and communities.

Petite has more than 100 US patents pending, dating back to 1995 on ad hoc networks. A listing of some of his inventions can found at Patent Genius or by a search at The US Patent Office. Petite is considered to be a visionary scientist/engineer, with business knowledge skills. His early inventions seem to demonstrate a foresight to see the technology curve with business values.

== Early life ==
Born in Atlanta, Georgia, he is the son of Robert Eugene Petite of the Fond du Lac Chippewa tribe and Helen Ruth Byrd.

Thomas David Petite goes by his middle name David. He was brought up in Atlanta by his father who was a Native American Chief of the Chippewa tribe in Wisconsin. His father educated David on the cultural heritage of the Chippewa tribe instilling strong values and a great sense of pride.

== Inventions ==
Petite is best known for his work in developing wireless mesh technology and much of his work revolves around the networking, remote control, activation or monitoring of wireless enabled devices. From his early invention of a personalized security system, in which a portable transmitter can be carried or worn and activated by an individual in need of assistance to transmit data relating specifically to that individual, to his most recent patents covering a site controller adapted to be used in an automated monitoring system for monitoring and controlling a plurality of remote devices via a host computer connected to a first communication network, his work has covered a multitude of industry sectors and applications.

He is perhaps best known for his role in the invention of the necessary components integral to creating remotely monitored and controlled environmental systems within a specific location such as a home This set of inventions was a driving force behind the development of the so-called "Smart meter", and thus to what is now known as the "Smart Grid". According to one description “A true Smart Grid enables multiple applications to operate over a shared, interoperable network, similar in concept to the way the Internet works today.” His major contribution was developing the technology to allow a plurality of devices to operate together on one low power or proximity network. This technology allows each device to have single addressable identities and act as individuals or as an infinite and scalable series of devices.

== Career ==
Petite was a founder of StatSignal Systems, Inc. the first company, in the late 1990s, to patent and introduce wireless mesh technology (SMART CLOUD) to the utility industry and health care industry. The company later ran out of cash and was unable to commercialize the patents.

In 2003 Petite, along with partners, founded SIPCO, which develops technologies enabling robust self-organizing wireless networking and related technologies known as Wireless Mesh in conjunction with IntusIQ, a brand marketing company that licenses Petite's and other key innovators patents to various industries.

In 2012, GE and MPEGLA acquired a minority stake in SIPCO.

== Honors ==
In 2010 he was honored by the Georgia State Senate in a resolution introduced by Chairman of the Economic Development Committee Senator Chip Pearson. Mr. Petite was recognized for "his innovations in wireless technology and his incredible career in engineering and invention."

In 2010 he was honored as the 4th most successful Native American entrepreneur by Legal Zoom

Petite was invited to attend the presidential signing of The America Invents Act, in September 2011.

In September 2011 Gov. Nathan Deal of Georgia appointed Petite to the Georgia Council on American Indian Concerns, a body created by the Georgia Legislature in 1992 to help protect Indian graves and burial objects from accidental and intentional desecration. The Council is the only state entity specifically authorized to address the concerns of Georgia's American Indians.

== Media ==
In 2011 Petite was featured by CNN in its series, "In America".

== Sources ==
- United States Patent Trademark Office: [www.uspto.gov] Petite, Thomas inventor
- Energy Central; March 21, 2008 leading developer of wireless mesh David Petite
