= The Uncondemned =

- Directed by: Michele Mitchell; Nick Louvel
- Written by: Michele Mitchell
- Cinematography: Nick Louvel
- Edited by: Nick Louvel
- Production company: Film at Eleven Media
- Release dates: October 9, 2015 (Hamptons International Film Festival); October 21, 2016 (United States)
- Running time: 85 minutes
- Country: United States
- Languages: English; French; Kinyarwanda

The Uncondemned is a 2015 documentary film produced by Film at Eleven Media. Co-directed by Michele Mitchell and Nick Louvel, the film examines the first trial that prosecuted rape as a war crime and an act of genocide. Rape was declared a war crime in 1919 but was not tried in court until 1997 during the trial of Jean-Paul Akayesu as a part of the International Criminal Tribunal for Rwanda (ICTR). Shot in Rwanda, the Democratic Republic of the Congo, the Netherlands and the United States, The Uncondemned premiered at the Hamptons International Film Festival on October 9, 2015.

== Synopsis ==
The Uncondemned recounts the 1997 trial of Jean-Paul Akayesu for his alleged knowledge of the rapes and other war crimes during the Rwandan Genocide in 1994. The film features three women, who were victims of rape and anonymously testified in the trial, as well as American prosecutors Pierre-Richard Prosper and Sara Darehshori recalling their building the case against Akayesu.
