= William Houle =

American politician (1931–2013)

William Houle (August 22, 1931 – June 30, 2013) was an American politician.

Houle was chairman of the Fond du Lac Band of Lake Superior Chippewa 1974–1988. He also served on the reservation business board 1968–1974 from Brookston, Minnesota. He served in the United States Navy during the Korean War. He worked in the WK Steel Mill and was involved in education.
