= Succession (soundtrack) =

Soundtrack albums composed by Nicholas Britell

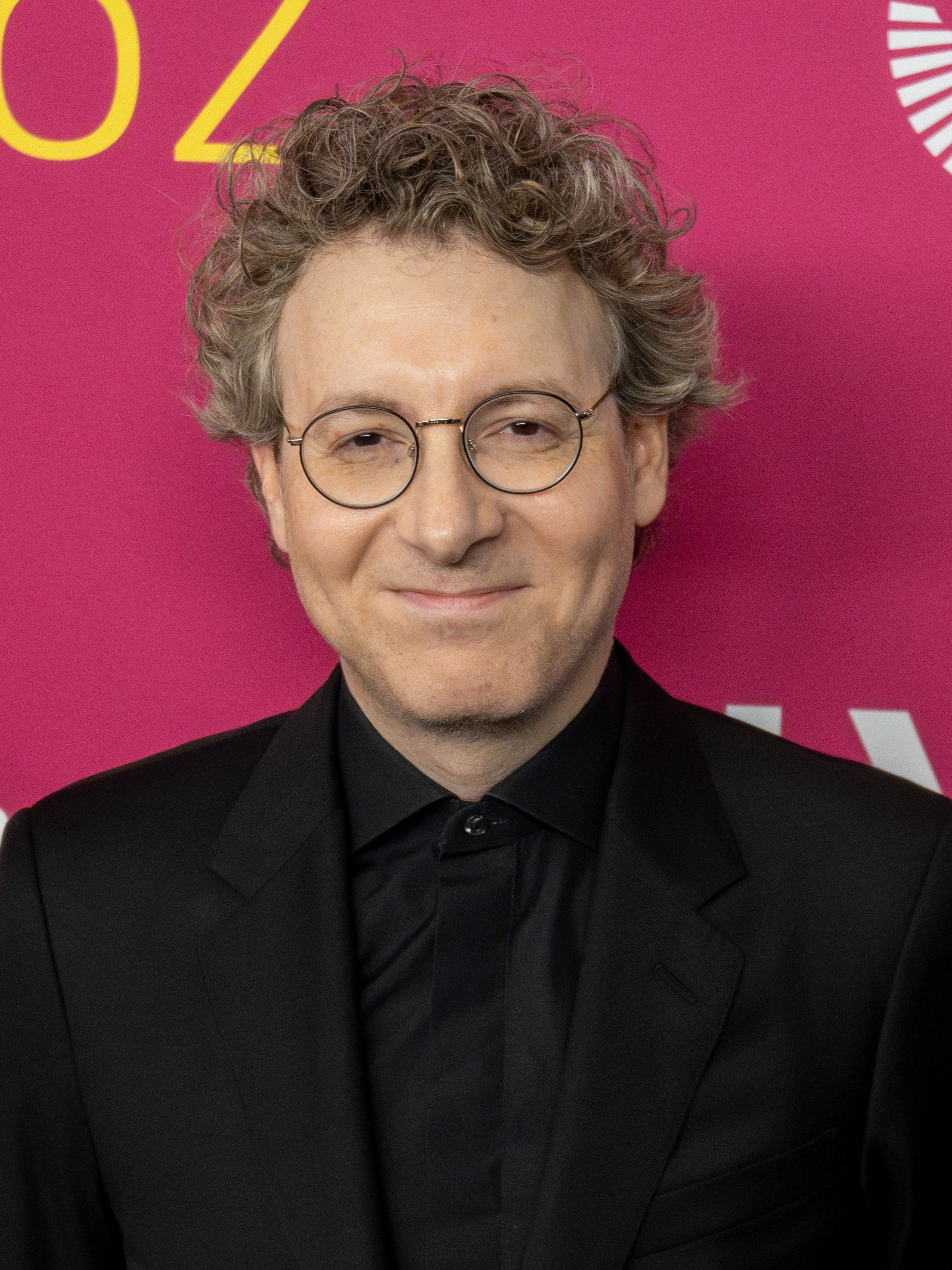
Nicholas Britell composed original music for the series.

The music for the HBO satirical black comedy-drama television series Succession (2018–2023) is composed by Nicholas Britell. It combines hip-hop and classical music and was inspired by the dark humour and 'absurdity' of the show's central characters and themes. The score albums for each season were distributed by Republic Records, WaterTower Music, Milan Records, and Lake George Music Group. Britell's score, along with the main title theme, received critical acclaim and several accolades.

== Overview ==
Nicholas Britell was hired to score the television series' music, referred by director and executive producer Adam McKay, who previously worked with him in The Big Short (2015) and Vice (2018). It was his first scoring stint for a television series. Though he understood the musical language of being distinctive from the show's satirical elements, he tried not to be musically funny, because "as soon as the music says this is funny, all the humor is drained [...] Getting darker makes it funny, and that's what I leaned into — this counterpoint." Hence, he approached a lot of the writing of the music as "imagining what the Roy family might imagine for themselves".

He wrote a dark classical score based on the late-18th century music, which had infused with hip-hop beats, using a Roland TR-808 drummed machine, detuned piano, modern filters and samples, which is music for "delusions of Kendall Roy (Jeremy Strong), who has a predilection for rap, but intentionally exaggerated". He sampled an initial part of the score to infuse with hip hop beats. Some of the score had consisted of cohesive, song-like variations of main themes instead of cues being directed for the actions, situations and characters. He was fascinated by finding strange sounds that are linked through the show. While mixing bass in the score, Britell "always turn it up a little 'too much', because that feels right to him for the show" while also experimenting piano, bells, strings, and percussions.

In the second season, the album featured the rap song "L to the OG" performed by Strong himself, to depict Roy's rap obsession. The song was written by Britell himself, as the showrunner Jesse Armstrong told him "Kendall was going to perform a rap for his father – because of course he would. Kendall doing a rap for Logan in itself is going to be a cringeworthy event, but if it's just cringeworthy and falls flat then it doesn't really work. It needs to be cringeworthy and well-executed [...] Kendall is basically the same age as I am and most people form their musical predilections in college, so I thought it would be really [funny] to take a beat [I wrote] from that time, that probably would represent Kendall's tastes too." Strong asked him to record the demo of it and had practiced the vocals, which was finalised. Britell appreciated his performance in both acting and singing, saying "To rap a sequence like that is not easy and requires a whole rhythm sensibility. It's a very different skill set from acting. I think he did an incredible job."

The third season's score was influenced by Italian classical music. Britell spent time in Tuscany studying the musical tradition. In some cues, the score had "the timelessness of that part of the world, the history and how that parallels with the sort of current mythmaking that the Roy family has of themselves at the same moment in time." As a result, he had the scope to explore grandeur for the sequences in the location, as well as its cues. He added that the FBI raid in the third episode is probably "one of the largest [cues] certainly up to that moment".

== Main title ==
The main title theme was composed using classical piano layered with hip-hop beats. He used beats from the TR-808, along with strings and brass, and wove the percussive instruments into the theme to create a dissonant sound. The theme song was released as a single on July 20, 2018. It has been opened to acclaim from critics and fans, and has given rise to several memes, remixes, fan projects, and TikTok viral trends.

In an article for Time, Raisa Bruner wrote that "The theme mixes Britell's expertise in classical composition with his background making hip-hop beats, layering the two styles. [Drew] Silverstein calls out the 808s (a popular drum machine sound), detuned piano (piano intentionally made to sound out-of-tune), audio-processing filters (more technical composition tools) and "gritty" strings that all come together in a way that's "not as sweet and glossy as you might get in other soaring themes." This is no Downton Abbey, gilding an image of a genteel patrician family, but rather something less polished and pleasant, reflecting the nastiness of the Roy family dynamics."

Emmanuel Ocbazghi of Insider stated of the main theme, "Britell manages to distill Succession's key themes into its title song. There's an unsettling atmosphere to it, an unease lurking beneath its polished veneer. This makes it hard to pinpoint exactly what the tone of the song is, but that's the point. Even fans of Succession argue whether the show is a dark comedy or a drama. The theme song matches those conflicting tones.

An official remix of the song by rapper Pusha T was released in October 2019.

== Soundtrack albums ==
=== Season 1 ===
Succession: Season 1 (HBO Original Series Soundtrack)

Soundtrack album by Nicholas Britell
- Released: August 9, 2019
- Genres: Classical; hip hop
- Length: 37:43
- Label: Milan Records

Singles from Succession: Season 1 (HBO Original Series Soundtrack)
- 1. "Succession (Main Title Theme)" Released: July 20, 2018

Succession: Season 1 (HBO Original Series Soundtrack) is the soundtrack to the first season of the television series, released on August 9, 2019 by Milan Records. The album was preceded by the single—the main title theme, released earlier in July 2018.

All music is composed by Nicholas Britell.

No.	Title	Length
1.	"Succession – Main Title Theme"	1:42
2.	"Adagio in C Minor"	1:30
3.	"Minuet in B Minor"	1:37
4.	"Andante in C Minor"	1:57
5.	"Strings Con Fuoco"	1:12
6.	"Clarinets and Strings"	1:07
7.	"Serenade in E-Flat Major"	0:50
8.	"Bell Atmospheres"	1:42
9.	"Waystar Royco Corporate Identity – "Feel It!""	0:44
10.	"Strings + 808 + Beat"	1:11
11.	"Theme Variation – Piano, Orchestra, 808"	0:52
12.	"Allegro in C Minor"	0:57
13.	"Dark Minuet"	1:05
14.	"Andante Con Moto – Strings in E-flat Minor"	2:14
15.	"Andante in C Minor – Solo Piano"	1:45
16.	"Succession – End Title Theme" (Strings and Winds Variation)	1:26
17.	"Andantino for Brass and Orchestra in B Minor"	1:51
18.	"A Piacere" (Orchestra)	1:52
19.	"Bell and Pizzicato Fantasia"	1:23
20.	"Power" (Instrumental)	1:35
21.	"Succession – End Title Theme" (Brass Quintet Variation)	1:24
22.	"Mysterium – Strings"	1:56
23.	"Austerlitz – Allegro Moderato"	1:15
24.	"Austerlitz – Allegretto"	1:37
25.	"Million Dollar Home Run"	1:30
26.	"Succession – End Title Theme" (Piano and Cello Variation)	1:29
Total length:		37:43

=== Season 2 ===
Succession: Season 2 (HBO Original Series Soundtrack)

Soundtrack album by Nicholas Britell
- Released: May 22, 2020
- Genres: Classical; hip hop
- Length: 39:52
- Label: WaterTower Music

Singles from Succession: Season 2 (HBO Original Series Soundtrack)
- 1. "L to the OG" Released: May 20, 2020

Succession: Season 2 (HBO Original Series Soundtrack) is the soundtrack to the second season of the television series, released on May 22, 2020 by WaterTower Music. The album was preceded by the single "L to the OG", performed by Jeremy Strong.

All music is composed by Nicholas Britell.

No.	Title	Length
1.	"Succession" (Main Title Theme; Extended Intro Version)	1:52
2.	"Rondo in F Minor for Piano and Orchestra – "Kendall's Journey""	1:27
3.	"Moderato Con Brio for Violin, Harp, and Orchestra"	1:56
4.	"Intermezzo in C Minor – "Money Wins""	1:47
5.	"Rondo in F Minor for Solo Piano – "Kendall's Summit""	1:36
6.	"Atmosphere in B Minor"	1:52
7.	"Contredanse – "Shiv's Move""	1:29
8.	"Cello Quintet in C Minor – "Tern Haven""	1:08
9.	"Andante Con Moto – Piano and Strings – "Vaulter""	2:54
10.	"Rondo in F Minor for String Orchestra"	1:36
11.	"Concerto Grosso in C Minor – Ripieno Strings"	2:05
12.	"Andante Con Moto – String Orchestra Variation"	2:27
13.	"Roman's Beat – "Hearts""	1:23
14.	"Andante in C Minor – Main Theme Strings Variation"	0:52
15.	"Maestoso – Piano Solo"	1:29
16.	"Larghetto – Piano, Celesta, Strings – "Kendall's Return""	1:53
17.	"Intermezzo in C Minor – Piano and Double Bass"	1:38
18.	"Moderato Con Brio – Violin Sextet"	1:13
19.	"Boar On The Floor"	1:51
20.	"Kendall's Departure – "This Is Not For Tears""	1:19
21.	"Maestoso – String Orchestra – "To The Press Conference""	1:32
22.	"Concerto Grosso in C Minor + End Credits – "You Have To Be A Killer""	1:58
23.	"L to the OG" (feat. Kendall Roy)	2:35
Total length:		39:52

=== Season 3 ===
Succession: Season 3 (HBO Original Series Soundtrack)

Soundtrack album by Nicholas Britell
- Released: April 29, 2022
- Genres: Classical; hip hop
- Length: 44:16
- Label: Republic Records

Succession: Season 3 (HBO Original Series Soundtrack) is the soundtrack to the third season of the television series, released on April 29, 2022 by Republic Records.

All music is composed by Nicholas Britell.

No.	Title	Length
1.	"Furioso in F Minor"	1:51
2.	"Milan – Promenade"	1:03
3.	"Rigaudon"	2:09
4.	"Andante Agitato – End Credits – "The Raid""	4:09
5.	""Sorry, Pinky""	1:24
6.	"Satyricon – Instrumental"	1:29
7.	""Tuscany" Suite for Piano and Orchestra"	2:03
8.	"Sinfonietta in A Minor – Strings Variation – "The Photo""	1:08
9.	"Impromptu No. 1 in C Minor for Piano"	5:33
10.	"Scherzo in F Minor – Strings"	0:45
11.	"Doloroso – Strings"	2:26
12.	"Serenata – "Il Viaggio""	1:21
13.	""Tuscany" Suite for Piano and Bass"	2:01
14.	"Impromptu No. 2 for Piano and Orchestra"	2:11
15.	"Scherzo in F Minor – Piano and Bass"	0:56
16.	"Ricercare – Strings and Voices – Bonus Track"	1:18
17.	"Nocturne – Piano and Strings"	1:22
18.	"Impromptu No. 1 for Strings – End Credits – "Chiantishire""	3:02
19.	"Dolce Pianos and Strings – "Il Viaggio""	1:21
20.	"Andante Moderato – End Credits – "Amen""	2:50
21.	"Honesty" (feat. Kendall Roy)	3:54
Total length:		44:16

=== Season 4 ===
Succession: Season 4 (HBO Original Series Soundtrack)

Soundtrack album by Nicholas Britell
- Released: May 29, 2023
- Genres: Classical; hip hop
- Length: 48:43
- Label: Lake George Music Group

Succession: Season 4 (HBO Original Series Soundtrack) is the soundtrack to the fourth and final season of the television series, released on May 29, 2023, by Lake George Music Group.

All music is composed by Nicholas Britell.

No.	Title	Length
1.	"Succession – Main Title Theme; Orchestral Intro Version"	2:01
2.	"Langsam – "We Gave It a Go""	2:13
3.	"End Credits – Vivace Appassionato in G Minor"	1:09
4.	"Lento Nobile + Lento Pizzicato"	1:16
5.	"Allegro Bellicoso – "Pirates""	0:55
6.	"Lamentoso – "Needy Love Sponges""	2:40
7.	"Minuet in C Minor – English Horn – "I Need You""	1:47
8.	"Phone Call"	3:26
9.	"Piano Solo + Elegy for Orchestra – "Logan's Return""	2:45
10.	"Lamentoso – Clarinets, Piano, Pizzicato Strings"	0:51
11.	"End Credits – "Action That""	2:05
12.	"Pianos + 808 + Beat – "Welcome Home""	2:04
13.	"Marcato e con Forza"	1:16
14.	"A Piacere di Nuovo"	2:12
15.	"Interlude – Ricercare – "On the Lot""	0:40
16.	"Minuet in C Minor – Strings and Viola Solo"	1:30
17.	"Andante Espressivo – String Orchestra – "Number One Boy""	3:25
18.	""My Dear, Dear, World of a Father""	1:57
19.	"Molto Grave – Recessional"	1:02
20.	"Elegy – Strings"	2:31
21.	"Lamentoso – Piano, Oboes, Strings"	1:50
22.	"Allegro in F Minor – Arrival at Waystar"	1:30
23.	"It's Done"	2:49
24.	"Succession – Andante Risoluto"	2:28
25.	"End Credits – Choir and Orchestra – "With Open Eyes""	2:21
Total length:		48:43

== Accolades ==
Award		Category	Nominee(s)	Result	Ref.
Grammy Awards	2023	Best Score Soundtrack for Visual Media	Nicholas Britell (for Succession: Season 3 soundtrack)	Nominated	
Primetime Creative Arts Emmy Awards	2019	Outstanding Original Main Title Theme Music	Nicholas Britell	Won	
Primetime Creative Arts Emmy Awards	2020	Outstanding Music Composition for a Series (Original Dramatic Score)	Nicholas Britell (for "This Is Not for Tears")	Nominated	
Primetime Creative Arts Emmy Awards	2022	Outstanding Music Composition for a Series (Original Dramatic Score)	Nicholas Britell (for "Chiantishire")	Nominated	
Primetime Creative Arts Emmy Awards	2023	Outstanding Music Composition for a Series (Original Dramatic Score)	Nicholas Britell (for "Connor's Wedding")	Nominated	
Society of Composers & Lyricists Awards	2019	Outstanding Original Score for a Television or Streaming Production	Nicholas Britell	Nominated	
Society of Composers & Lyricists Awards	2022	Outstanding Original Score for a Television Production	Nicholas Britell	Nominated	
