= Karen Diver =

Ojibwe politician and political advisor from Minnesota, U.S.

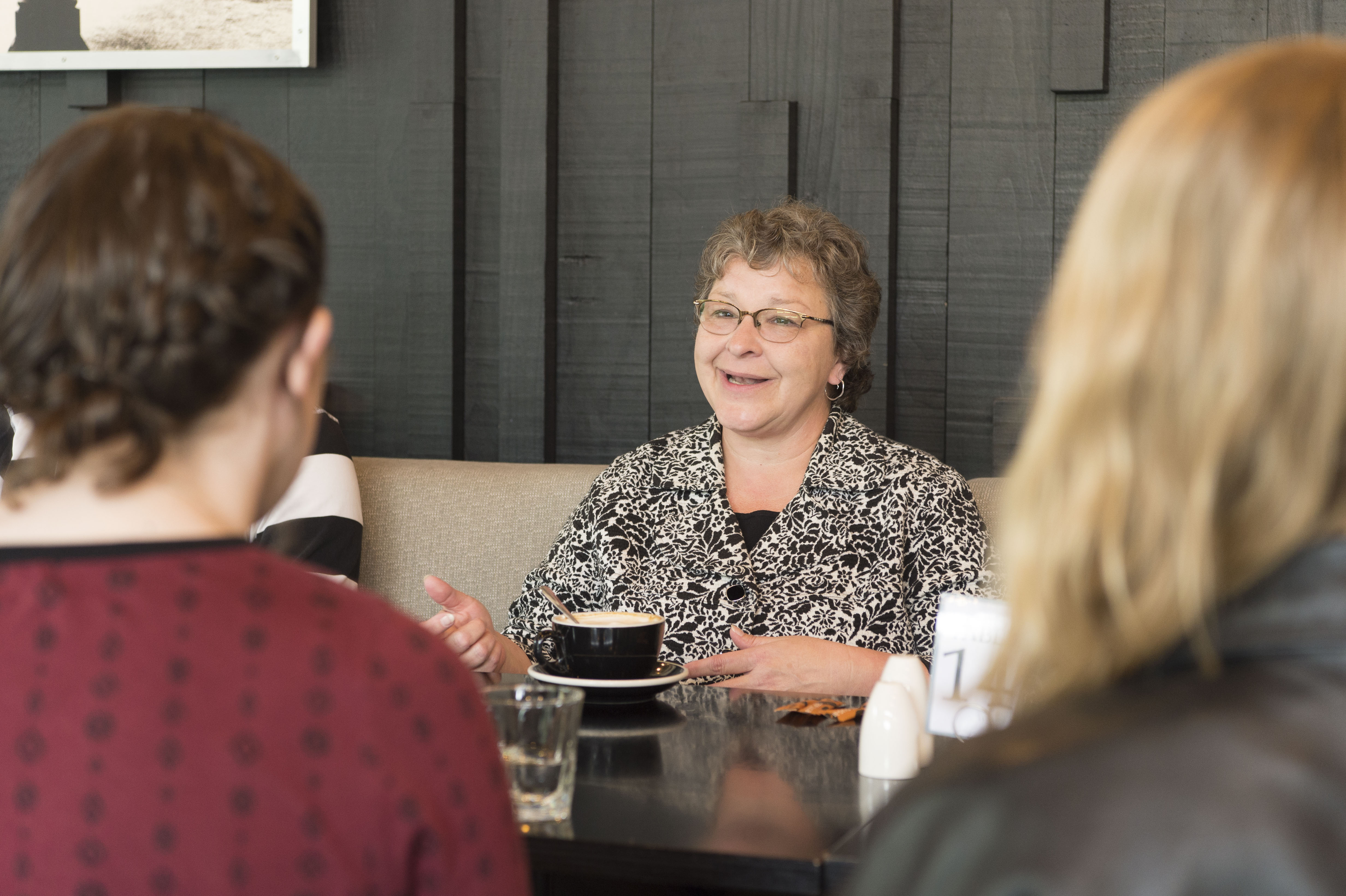
- Diver in 2016

Chairperson of the Fond du Lac Band of Lake Superior Chippewa
- Preceded by: Peter Defoe
- Succeeded by: Wally Dupuis (interim)

Personal details
- Education: University of Minnesota Duluth (BA) Harvard Kennedy School (MPA)

Karen Diver is an Ojibwe politician and political advisor. She served as the elected tribal leader of the Fond du Lac Band of Lake Superior Chippewa.

== Early life and education ==
Diver attended the University of Minnesota, Duluth, where she earned a bachelor's degree in cconomics. As a 2002 Bush Leadership Fellow, she received a Masters in Public Administration from the Harvard Kennedy School of Government.

== Tribal governance ==
Diver first began working for the Fond du Lac Band of Lake Superior Chippewa in 2003 as the director for special projects. In 2007, Diver was elected to serve as Chairwoman of the Fond du Lac Band of Lake Superior Chippewa. She became the first woman to serve as chairperson of the band and served several terms, remaining in the position until 2015, when she stepped down.

During Diver's first term as chairwoman, a petition was filed to remove Diver from her position. The petition was filed by Lynn Olson-Diver, who is related to Karen Diver through marriage, and included allegations of malfeasance in handling tribal affairs, dereliction or neglect of duty and refusal to comply with any provisions of the constitution and bylaws of the tribe. The petition was signed by slightly more than 20 percent eligible voters who lived on the reservation, which brought the allegations before the Reservation Business Committee. The committee voted 4-0 to dismiss all allegations (Diver abstained from voting).

== Climage advocacy ==
In late 2013, Diver was chosen to serve on President Barack Obama's Task Force on Climate Resilience. She was one of two tribal representatives on the task force, and the only tribal representative from the contiguous United States. As a member of the task force, Diver encouraged the federal government to adopt a greater sense of urgency in tackling climate change and to help communities plan for climate-related hazards. In November 2015, Diver was appointed Special Assistant for Native American Affairs as a part of the Obama Administration. She was the first woman and first elected tribal leader to serve this role.
