= Haiti: Where Did the Money Go =

- Written by: Michele Mitchell
- Directed by: Michele Mitchell
- Country of origin: United States
- Original language: English

Production
- Producer: Michele Mitchell
- Running time: 52 minutes
- Production company: Film at Eleven Media

Original release
- Network: PBS
- Release: 2012

Haiti: Where Did the Money Go? is a 2012 Film at Eleven Media production that was produced, written and directed by Michele Mitchell. Shot in the aftermath of the 2010 Haiti earthquake, the documentary looks at what really happens with the money donated to help with disaster aid. Haiti: Where Did The Money Go? aired on PBS and won the 2013 Edward R. Murrow Award for News Documentary.

== Summary ==
Haiti: Where Did the Money Go seeks to discover where the funds raised for the relief effort after the 2010 earthquake in Haiti really went. Taking place ten months after the earthquake, and again 10 months after that, the film surveys the disaster relief efforts that NGOs have undertaken. It investigates whether the record-breaking amounts of money raised has been distributed appropriately. Despite the more than 9 billion public and private dollars raised for relief, many people in Haiti still live in camps with inadequate food, water, shelter, and cleanliness.

The film travels to several camps in and around Port-au-Prince, and presents the unfortunate reality of life in Haiti since the earthquake. Haitians, employees of charitable organizations, doctors, and others relate their experiences with NGOs, both good and bad, regarding disaster relief. It becomes clear that despite some progress, the NGOs operate without accountability and inter organization communication, and the Haitians end up not receiving the help they were promised.

== Synopsis ==
The film begins by discussing the astounding amount of money raised to aid Haiti. Americans alone donated 1.4 billion in relief funds to NGOs in the year following the disaster. These organizations faced criticism in the past due to their unorganized responses to previous disasters. When the earthquake in Haiti struck, these aid groups envisioned a new system of organization, or “humanitarian aid 2.0,” that would provide effective and quick relief. Michele Mitchell travelled to Haiti for the first time in November 2010 to see if this had been carried out.

What she found was thousands of homeless Haitians living in camps with inadequate access to clean water, food, and latrines. Thousands of people shared full toilets that were not cleaned, lived in ripping tents on muddy and dirty grounds, and struggled to make money to feed their families.

It is in one of these camps that Michele met Wilma Vital, a mother of 2 whose business was destroyed in the earthquake. She expressed anger at the American Red Cross for helping those in other camps but not those in hers. Many other Haitians expressed similar sentiments; they believed that NGOs used the money they raised to fund themselves, hotels, restaurants instead of helping Haiti.

Michele interviewed many employees of NGOs working in Haiti. She questioned David Meltzer, who was in charge of international relief for the American Red Cross, the largest working NGO in Haiti. He, as well as Luke King of Catholic Relief Services, maintained that the money was being well spent and that the situation in Haiti was improving. But other NGO employees, like Julie Schindall from Oxfam America and Barth A. Green from Project Medishare, expressed that they were still in need of funds and resources from these larger NGOs to maintain their services.

While Michele was in Haiti, a hurricane was expected to hit the island. The government as well as NGOs encouraged Haitians living in the camps to evacuate. They expressed that they had nowhere else to go, and refused to move, preferring instead to wait out the storm in their tents. Following the storm, the lack of uncontaminated water caused a cholera outbreak, which was deadly to many in the camps. One reason for this is that the NGOs would not communicate with one another as to the needs of the Haitians, so inadequate or inappropriate supplies were sent.

20 months after the earthquake, Michele returned to Haiti to check on the progress of the relief efforts. Despite some improvements in housing at certain camps, thousands still lived in unsafe and unclean conditions. She checked back in with Wilma Vital, who with a husband, two children, and another baby on the way only had enough food to last for a few more days. Other Haitians expressed anger at those who come to visit and document their hardship but then do nothing to alleviate it.

Ultimately, the film provides a complex picture of NGOs, some of which work hard to provide services in difficult circumstances, others who seem to only benefit themselves in the “big business of emergency aid."

== Awards ==
•2013 Gracie Award for Outstanding Investigative Program

•2012 CINE Golden Eagle

•2013 CINE Special Jury Award for Best Investigative Documentary

•2013 Edward R. Murrow Award for News Documentary

•2013 Women's International Film Festival Best Documentary Short
