= Michele Mitchell (journalist) =

American journalist and author (born 1970)

- Born: May 24, 1970 (age 56); Yorba Linda, California, U.S.
- Occupations: Filmmaker; journalist; author
- Years active: 1997–present
- Notable work: The Uncondemned, Haiti: Where Did the Money Go?, A New Kind of Party Animal: How the Young Are Changing Politics as Usual, The Latest Bombshell, Our Girl in Washington

Michele Mitchell (born May 24, 1970) is an American filmmaker, journalist and author best known for her on-camera reporting for PBS and CNN Headline News and her documentaries Haiti: Where Did the Money Go? (PBS, 2013) and The Uncondemned (2015).

== Early life ==
She grew up in Yorba Linda, California, and attended Esperanza High School, where she ran track and cross country, and wrote for the school newspaper and the youth section of The Los Angeles Times. She attended Northwestern University in Evanston, Illinois, where she earned a BSJ and MSJ in 1992. Throughout college, she wrote for the sports section of the Chicago Tribune and was a member of Delta Zeta sorority. Her first job was on Capitol Hill, where she was the youngest congressional communications director, for Rep. Pete Geren (D-TX), who became the Secretary of the Army for Presidents George W. Bush and Barack Obama.

== Journalism career ==
Her journalism career began during the height of the "Generation X" political trend, which she wrote about in 1998 in her first book, A New Kind of Party Animal: How the Young Are Changing Politics As Usual (Simon & Schuster). The book led to a job at CNN Headline News as a political analyst for the 2000 election. In 2001, she became the political anchor at Headline News, covering daily political stories and, post-9/11, she filed one of the last interviews given by the mujahideen Abdul Haq. She particularly emphasized the Patriot Act, which earned her the verbal disdain of Attorney General John Ashcroft's staff and frequent appearances on Politically Incorrect. She left Headline News in 2003 after her second novel was published, but returned to television on Now with Bill Moyers on PBS. There, she filed investigative stories on the war on terror, vote fraud, women and the economy, and the Abramoff scandal.

== Haiti: Where Did the Money Go? ==
In 2010, she began working on her own web series, tracking what happened to the money donated by private US citizens to major US charities after the earthquake in Haiti. The Haiti: Where Did the Money Go? web series debuted on social media in January 2011. She then produced and directed a television documentary, also called Haiti: Where Did the Money Go?, which was made into a film in 2012. The film, which aired over 1,000 times in the United States on PBS stations generated controversy, when the American Red Cross attacked it as "inaccurate". However, the film was widely embraced, both critically and by the Haitian community, activists, aid workers and Members of Congress. In 2013, the film won many awards, including a Gracie Award for Outstanding Investigative Program, a CINE Golden Eagle, a CINE Special Jury Award for Best Investigative Documentary, and the 2013 National Edward R. Murrow Award for Best TV Documentary. It was also screened at the 2013 Miami Women's International Film Festival where it won Best Documentary Short.

== The Uncondemned ==
In 2013, she began filming The Uncondemned with co-director Nick Louvel, a documentary about the first time rape was prosecuted as a war crime during the Rwanda genocide. On September 24, 2015, just a month before The Uncondemned was set to be screened at the Hamptons International Film Festival, co-director Louvel was killed in a single-car accident hours after hand-delivering the film to the festival.

In June 2016, the final cut of the film made its debut at the New York Human Rights Watch Film Festival. The following October, the documentary was selected by the Hamptons International Film Festival to make its world premiere. Here, it was aired in front of 700 people at the United Nations, hosted by the UN Special Representative for Rape in Conflict Zainab Bangura. It was named the Brizzolara Family Foundation Award Winner for a Film in Conflict & Resolution. The film also won the Rabinowitz & Grant Award for Social Justice.

The Uncondemned would receive universal critical acclaim, 100% on Rotten Tomatoes, with reviewers praising it as "a master class in demonstrating how people can change the world," "a courtroom thriller crackling with suspense", and "most extraordinary are interviews with the women who came forward to provide evidence in court. Their integrity and tenacity, and their loyalty to one another, are enough to bring you to tears."

As Kenneth Turan of the Los Angeles Times wrote: "It's the story of how history is made in small, at times uncertain, steps, but it is something more as well. For what "The Uncondemned" convincingly demonstrates is the cumulative power of a small group of people with an intense passion for justice, idealists with practical experience whose belief in the power inherent in speaking the truth is not to be denied." The film had a 30-city US theatrical release through Abramorama and then screened in twenty-two countries. It has been translated into French, Arabic and Haitian Creole.

== TEDx Talk ==
In April 2015, Mitchell gave a talk at TEDxNavesink, "What's Rape's Brand?" which discussed the topic of The Uncondemned, as well as addressed the lack of urgency in addressing sexual violence in conflict and the need to begin this by using the "right words" to describe the crime: "It's an act of power, torture and humiliation."

== Controversy ==
In June 2016, the Mechanism for the International Criminal Tribunal, which replaced a now-closed International Criminal Tribunal for Rwanda, tried to block The Uncondemned in the name of protecting the witnesses who appeared in it. In July 2016, the Mechanism began investigating Mitchell for contempt of court. The spokesman for the Mechanism, Ousman Njikam, told a reporter: "I'll give you an example of a kid you have to take care of," Njikam said, "and the kid who wants to cross the road, but you see an oncoming car. Even if the kid doesn't appreciate that you want to stop him or her from crossing [in their] own interest — you see the point I am trying to make?" Victoire Mukambanda, Cecile Mukarugwiza, Seraphine Mukakinani and Mitchell fought back through lawyers over four months: ""When we went to testify, no one told us, 'This is where it ends from. You don't have the right to tell this story somewhere else.'" Forty-eight hours before the world premiere at the UN, the Mechanism cleared the charges.

== Special achievements ==
Mitchell has received Gracie Awards and an honorable citation from the Overseas Press Awards for her coverage of Nepalese girls sold into indentured servitude. She also serves on the advisory board of the Authors Guild of America, Amman Imman and BYKids. She has reported extensively from countries such as Afghanistan, India, Jordan, Israel, Lebanon, Libya and Morocco, as well as most of the 50 states.

Mitchell was named Prix Monte-Carlo "Femme de l'Année" 2017 for her work on The Uncondemned. The following year she was named an Ochberg Fellow at the Dart Center for Trauma and Journalism at Columbia University.

== Selected works ==
- A New Kind of Party Animal: How the Young Are Changing Politics as Usual (1998) ISBN 0-684-83697-1
- The Latest Bombshell (2003) ISBN 0-452-28544-5
- Our Girl in Washington (2006) ISBN 0-452-28607-7
